= Flesh-n-Bone discography =

List of music recordings

The discography of rapper Flesh-n-Bone of Cleveland rap group Bone Thugs-n-Harmony.

== Albums ==
Year	Title	Chart positions		RIAA certifications
Year	Title	Billboard 200	U.S. R&B	RIAA certifications
1996	T.H.U.G.S.: Released: November 19, 1996; Label: Def Jam / Mo Thugs Records	23	8	Gold
2000	5th Dog Let Loose: Released: October 10, 2000; Label: Koch Records / Mo Thugs Records	98		
2011	Blaze of Glory: Released: September 13, 2011; Label: BTNH Worldwide / RBC Records			
2020	Do You: Released: April 23, 2020 (iTunes) / May 4, 2020; Label: BTNH Worldwide / The Life Entertainment			
2022	To the Bone: Released: March 18, 2022; Label: BTNH Worldwide / The Life Entertainment			

== Compilations ==
Year	Title
1999	From Cleveland 2 Cali: Released: 1999; Label: Flesh Bone Incorporated
1999	From Cleveland 2 Cali: Day 2: Released: 1999-2000; Label: Flesh Bone Incorporated

== EPs ==
Year	Title
2023	Living Legend EP: Released: 2023; Label: Flesh Bone Global (FBG)

== Guest appearances ==
Year	Title	Artist(s)	Album
1995	"Death Is Calling"	5th Ward Boyz	Rated G
1996	"Falling" Remix	Montell Jordan	More...
1996	"Rumors & War"	Mo Thugs	Family Scriptures
1997	"Intro; Insanity"	Poetic Hustla'z	Trials & Tribulations
1998	"Riot"; "Otherside/Outro"	Mo Thugs	Chapter II: Family Reunion
1998	"If I Die Tonight"	Montell Jordan, Monifah	Def Jam's Rush Hour (soundtrack)
1999	"Mo Thugs"	Various Artists	Well Connected
2001	"Still the Greatest"	Layzie Bone, Flesh-n-Bone	Thug by Nature
2009	"Better Get With It"	Layzie Bone	Thug Twinz
2009	"Playin'"	The Bum Keef G	Krayzie Bone presents: The Bum Keef G
2010	"Mueve Se Culo"	Ta Smallz	Who Killed My Mama?!
2011	"Hear ‘Em Knockin"	Layzie Bone, Krayzie Bone	The Definition
2011	"Better Days"	Layzie Bone, Krayzie Bone & Felecia	The Meaning
2011	F*** a Bitch	Bizzy Bone & AC Killer	Countdown to Armageddon
2011	Where You Running To	Bizzy Bone & AC Killer	Countdown to Armageddon
2015	"Conscious Revolution"	Traumatize, Bizzy Bone	Spawn 1991
2015	"Can't Walk Away"	Krayzie Bone	Chasing the Devil: Temptation

== Albums with Bone Thugs-N-Harmony ==
Year	Title	Chart Positions			Certifications
Year	Title	US	US R&B	US Rap	Certifications
1994	Creepin on ah Come Up: Released: June 21, 1994; Label: Ruthless	12	2	*	US: 2× Platinum
1995	E. 1999 Eternal: Released: July 25, 1995; Label: Ruthless	1	1	*	US: 6× Platinum; CAN: Platinum
1997	The Art of War: Released: July 29, 1997; Label: Ruthless	1	1	*	US: 4× Platinum; CAN: Gold
2000	BTNHResurrection: Released: February 29, 2000; Label: Ruthless	2	1	*	US: Platinum
2010	Uni-5: The World's Enemy: Released: May 4, 2010; Label: BTNH Worldwide/Warner Bros./Asylum	14	5	3	
