= Bone Thugs-n-Harmony discography =

- Studio albums: 11
- Extended plays: 2
- Compilation albums: 4
- Singles: 23
- Music videos: 23

This is the discography of American hip hop group Bone Thugs-n-Harmony.

== Albums ==
=== Studio albums ===
List of studio albums, with selected chart positions and certifications
Title	Album details	Peak chart positions									Certifications
Title	Album details	US	US R&B	AUS	CAN	GER	NLD	NZ	SWI	UK	Certifications
Faces of Death (as B.O.N.E. Enterpri$e)	Released: May 28, 1993; Label: Stoney Burke; Formats: CD, LP, cassette, digital download	188	29	—	—	—	—	—	—	—	
E. 1999 Eternal	Released: July 25, 1995 (US); Label: Ruthless; Formats: CD, LP, cassette, digital download	1	1	48	14	29	13	10	34	39	RIAA: 4× Platinum; BPI: Gold; MC: Platinum; RMNZ: Platinum
The Art of War	Released: July 29, 1997 (US); Label: Ruthless; Formats: CD, LP, cassette, digital download	1	1	54	10	38	30	4	44	42	RIAA: 4× Platinum; MC: Gold; RMNZ: Gold
BTNHResurrection	Released: February 29, 2000 (US); Label: Ruthless; Formats: CD, LP, cassette, digital download	2	1	—	—	87	—	16	—	—	RIAA: Platinum; RMNZ: Gold
Thug World Order	Released: October 29, 2002 (US); Label: Ruthless; Formats: CD, LP, digital download	12	3	—	—	—	—	23	—	—	
Thug Stories	Released: September 19, 2006 (US); Label: Koch; Formats: CD, digital download	25	3	—	—	—	—	—	—	—	
Strength & Loyalty	Released: May 8, 2007 (US); Labels: Full Surface, Interscope; Formats: CD, LP, digital download	2	2	—	—	—	—	28	—	112	RIAA: Gold; RMNZ: Gold
Uni5: The World's Enemy	Released: May 4, 2010 (US); Labels: BTNH Worldwide, Asylum, Reprise; Formats: CD, LP, digital download	14	5	—	—	—	—	19	—	—	
The Art of War: World War III	Released: December 10, 2013 (US); Labels: BTNH Worldwide, Seven Arts Music; Formats: CD, digital download	—	28	—	—	—	—	—	—	—	
New Waves	Released: June 23, 2017; Label: eOne Music; Formats: CD, digital download	181	—	—	—	—	—	—	—	—	
"—" denotes a recording that did not chart or was not released in that territory.

=== Compilation albums ===
List of compilation albums, with selected chart positions and certifications
Title	Album details	Peak chart positions			Certifications
Title	Album details	US	US R&B	US Rap	Certifications
The Collection Vol. 1	Released: November 24, 1998; Label: Ruthless; Formats: CD, cassette, digital download	32	12	—	RIAA: Platinum
The Collection Vol. 2	Released: November 14, 2000; Label: Ruthless; Formats: CD, cassette, digital download	41	15	—	RIAA: Gold
Greatest Hits	Released: November 16, 2004; Label: Ruthless; Formats: CD, digital download	95	30	12	RIAA: Platinum
T.H.U.G.S.	Released: November 13, 2007; Label: Ruthless; Formats: CD, digital download	73	13	5	
Lost Archives Vol. 1	Released: June 25, 2013; Label: Harmony Howse; Formats: CD, digital download	—	—	—	
"—" denotes a recording that did not chart.

=== Other compilations ===
- 2006: Behind the Harmony
- 2006: Everyday Thugs
- 2007: Eternal Legends
- 2009: The Book of Thugs
- 2009: Uni5 the Prequel: The Untold Story
- 2011: For Smokers Only

=== Mixtapes ===
- 2009: The Fixtape Vol. 3: Special Delivery
- 2010: Thuggish II

== Extended plays ==
List of extended plays, with selected chart positions and certifications
Title	Extended play details	Peak chart positions			Certifications
Title	Extended play details	US	US R&B	NZ	Certifications
Creepin on ah Come Up	Released: June 21, 1994; Label: Ruthless; Formats: CD, cassette, digital download	12	2	29	RIAA: 4× Platinum
Bone 4 Life	Released: September 2, 2005; Labels: Bone Thugs, U-Neek; Format: CD	—	—	—	
"—" denotes a recording that did not chart.

== Singles ==
=== As lead artist ===
List of singles as lead artist, with selected chart positions and certifications, showing year released and album name
Title	Year	Peak chart positions										Certifications	Album
Title	Year	US	US R&B	US Rap	AUS	CAN	GER	NLD	NZ	SWI	UK	Certifications	Album
"Thuggish Ruggish Bone" (featuring Shatasha Williams)	1994	22	11	2	—	—	—	—	2	—	—	RIAA: Gold; RMNZ: 2× Platinum	Creepin on ah Come Up
"Foe tha Love of $" (featuring Eazy-E)	1995	41	19	4	—	—	—	—	—	—	—	RMNZ: Platinum	Creepin on ah Come Up
"The Points" (with the Notorious B.I.G., Coolio, Redman, Ill Al Skratch, Big Mike, Busta Rhymes and Buckshot)	1995	—	80	—	—	—	—	—	—	—	—		Panther (soundtrack)
"1st of tha Month"	1995	14	12	4	—	—	—	46	7	—	15	RIAA: Gold; RMNZ: Platinum	E. 1999 Eternal
"East 1999"	1995	62	39	8	—	—	—	—	15	—	—		E. 1999 Eternal
"Tha Crossroads"	1996	1	1	1	15	17	15	5	1	19	8	RIAA: 2× Platinum; ARIA: Gold; RMNZ: 2× Platinum	E. 1999 Eternal
"Days of Our Livez"	1996	— (Note: "Days of Our Livez" did not enter the Billboard Hot 100, but peaked at number 39 on the Hot 100 Airplay chart.)	— (Note: "Days of Our Livez" did not enter the Hot R&B/Hip-Hop Songs chart, but peaked at number 11 on the R&B/Hip-Hop Airplay chart.)	2	—	—	—	—	5	—	37		Set It Off (soundtrack) / The Collection Volume One
"Look into My Eyes"	1997	4	4	2	87	—	—	—	3	—	16	RIAA: Platinum	The Art of War / Batman & Robin (soundtrack)
"If I Could Teach the World"	1997	27	20	3	—	—	—	—	11	—	—	RIAA: Gold	The Art of War
"Thug Luv" (featuring 2pac)	1997	—	— (Note: "Thug Luv" did not enter the Hot R&B/Hip-Hop Songs chart, but peaked at number 60 on the R&B/Hip-Hop Airplay chart.)	9	—	—	—	—	—	—	—	RMNZ: Gold	The Art of War
"War" (featuring Henry Rollins, Tom Morello and Flea)	1998	—	—	—	—	—	—	—	—	—	—		Small Soldiers (soundtrack)
"Resurrection (Paper, Paper)"	2000	— (Note: "Resurrection (Paper, Paper)" did not enter the Billboard Hot 100, but peaked at number 23 on the Bubbling Under Hot 100 Singles chart.)	52	—	—	—	—	—	—	—	—	RMNZ: Gold	BTNHResurrection
"Can't Give It Up"	2000	—	—	—	—	—	—	—	—	—	—		BTNHResurrection
"Change the World" (featuring Big B)	2000	—	—	—	—	—	—	—	31	—	—		BTNHResurrection
"Get Up & Get It" (featuring 3LW and Felecia)	2002	—	63	25	—	—	—	—	—	—	—		Thug World Order
"Money, Money"	2002	—	—	—	—	—	—	—	—	—	—		Thug World Order
"Home" (featuring Phil Collins)	2003	—	93	6	—	—	—	83	6	85	19		Thug World Order
"Take the Lead (Wanna Ride)" (with Wisin & Yandel, featuring Fatman Scoop and Melissa Jiménez)	2006	—	—	—	—	—	—	—	—	—	—		Take the Lead (soundtrack)
"Fire"	2006	—	—	—	—	—	—	—	—	—	—		Thug Stories
"Don't Stop"	2006	—	—	—	—	—	—	—	—	—	—		Thug Stories
"I Tried" (featuring Akon)	2007	6	45	6	—	45	—	—	4	—	69	RIAA: Platinum; RMNZ: Platinum	Strength & Loyalty
"Lil' L.O.V.E." (featuring Mariah Carey and Bow Wow)	2007	— (Note: "Lil' L.O.V.E." did not enter the Billboard Hot 100, but peaked at number 17 on the Bubbling Under Hot 100 Singles chart.)	66	24	—	—	—	—	6	—	—		Strength & Loyalty
"Young Thugs"	2007	—	—	—	—	—	—	—	—	—	—		T.H.U.G.S.
"See Me Shine" (featuring Lyfe Jennings, Phaedra and J Rush)	2009	—	30	10	—	—	—	—	—	—	—		Uni5: The World's Enemy
"Rebirth"	2010	—	19	8	—	—	—	—	—	—	—		Uni5: The World's Enemy
"Meet Me In the Sky"	2010	—	8	3	—	—	—	—	—	—	—		Uni5: The World's Enemy
"Gone" (featuring Ricco Barrino)	2010	—	30	14	—	—	—	—	—	—	—		Uni5: The World's Enemy
"Everything 100" (featuring Ty Dolla $ign)	2013	—	19	8	—	—	—	—	—	—	—		The Art of War: World War III
"More Than Thugs"	2015	—	—	—	—	—	—	—	—	—	—		Non-album single
"Coming Home" (featuring Stephen Marley)	2017	—	24	12	—	—	—	—	—	—	—		New Waves
"If Heaven Had a Cellphone" (featuring Tank)	2017	—	14	7	—	—	—	—	—	—	—		New Waves
"Fantasy" (featuring Jesse Rankins)	2017	—	10	5	—	—	—	—	—	—	—		New Waves
"Survival" (featuring Ky-Mani Marley)	2019	—	—	—	—	—	—	—	—	—	—		Non-album single
"Aww Shit"	2025	—	—	—	—	—	—	—	—	—	—		TBA
"Eazy" (featuring Lil Eazy-E)	2025	—	—	—	—	—	—	—	—	—	—		TBA
"Road Nights"	2025	—	—	—	—	—	—	—	—	—	—		TBA
"Over"	2025	—	—	—	—	—	—	—	—	—	—		TBA
"—" denotes a recording that did not chart or was not released in that territory.

=== As featured artist ===
List of singles as featured artist, with selected chart positions and certifications, showing year released and album name
Title	Year	Peak chart positions					Certifications	Album
Title	Year	US	US R&B	AUS	NZ	UK	Certifications	Album
"Breakdown" (Mariah Carey featuring Bone Thugs-n-Harmony)	1998	—	4	38	4	98	RIAA: Gold; RMNZ: Gold	Butterfly
"Ghetto Cowboy" (Mo Thugs featuring Bone Thugs-n-Harmony)	1998	15	14	—	—	—	RMNZ: Gold	Chapter II: Family Reunion
"Ultima" (PhaseOne featuring Bone Thugs-n-Harmony)	2019	—	—	—	—	—		Transcendency
"Let's Ride" (YG & The Notorious B.I.G. featuring Lambo4oe, Ty Dolla Sign and Bone Thugs-n-Harmony)	2023	—	—	—	—	—		Fast X (soundtrack)
"—" denotes a recording that did not chart or was not released in that territory.

== Other certified songs ==
List of songs, with certifications, showing year released and album name
Title	Year	Certifications	Album
"Notorious Thugs" (The Notorious B.I.G. featuring Bone Thugs-n-Harmony)	1997	RMNZ: 3× Platinum	Life After Death

== Guest Appearances ==
List of non-single guest appearances, with other performing artists, showing year released and album name
Title	Year	Other artist(s)	Album
"Everyday Thang"	1995	None	The Show (soundtrack)
"Shoot 'Em Up"	1996	None	The Great White Hype (soundtrack)
"Fuck tha Police"	1997	None	In tha Beginning...There Was Rap
"Till We Dead and Gone"	1998	Master P	MP da Last Don
"Hook It Up"	1998	Master P, Silkk the Shocker	I Got the Hook-Up (soundtrack)
"Thug Music Play On"	2000	None	Down to Earth (soundtrack)
"Makin' Good Love" (Remix)	2002	Avant	Non-album song
"Pay"	2003	Esham	Repentance
"Thug Pit"	2003	Insane Clown Posse, Esham, Tech N9ne, Kottonmouth Kings	2003 Hallowicked Single
"Let's Fight '04"	2004	2Pac, Crooked I	The Heart of a Thug Ghetto Gospel
"This Ain't a Game"	2005	Lil Eazy-E	Waist Deep (soundtrack)
"Power of a Smile"	2005	2Pac	The Rose Vol. 2
"Paper Paper"	2005	Shade Sheist	Before the Waitin' Before the Hatin'
"Strictly for My Grind"	2005	Space Hog the Boss	Vegas Hog Livin'
"Never Let You Down"	2006	Frankie J	Priceless
"Destroy You"	2006	DJ Khaled, Twista	Listennn... the Album
"4 Minutes" (Remix)	2006	Avant, Shawnna	Director
"Daily"	2006	Dub B	The SeaReal Way
"The Originators"	2007	DJ Khaled	We the Best
"Ain't No Hoes"	2007	Twista	Adrenaline Rush 2007
"Cash Rulez"	2007	Cassidy, Eve	B.A.R.S.
"Rollin'"	2008	DG Yola	Gutta World
"Celebration" (Remix)	2012	Game	Non-album song
"Lord"	2013	ASAP Ferg	Trap Lord
"Problems"	2015	Chie Money	Non-album songs
"The Land"	2015	Caine	Non-album songs
"Till I Die Pt. 2"	2015	Machine Gun Kelly, French Montana, Yo Gotti, Ray Cash	Non-album songs
"Hold Up, Wait a Minute"	2015	Zhu	Genesis Series
"Reach for the Stars"	2018	Wiz Khalifa	Rolling Papers 2
"Gon'Do"	2018	Berner	RICO
"Miles"	2024	J. Cole	2014 Forest Hills Drive (10 Year Anniversary Edition)

== Music videos ==
=== As lead artist ===
List of music videos as lead artist, with directors, showing year released
Title	Year	Director(s)
"Thuggish Ruggish Bone" (featuring Shatasha Williams)	1994	Terry Heller
"Foe tha Love of $" (featuring Eazy-E)	1994	Terry Heller
"1st of tha Month"	1995	Eric Meza
"Buddah Lovaz"	1995	Big Man
"East 1999"	1995	Craig Henry
"The Points" (with various artists)	1995	Unknown
"Tha Crossroads"	1996	Michael Martin
"Days of Our Livez"	1996	Michael Martin
"Look into My Eyes"	1997	Yarrow Kraner
"If I Could Teach the World"	1997	Joseph Kahn
"War"	1998	Marcus Nispel
"BNK"	1998	J. Kevin Swain
"Resurrection (Paper, Paper)"	2000	Jeff Byrd
"Change the World" (featuring Big B)	2000	Michael Martin
"Can't Give It Up"	2000	Smith & Barin
"Weed Song"	2000	RIKarto Handy
"Money, Money"	2002	Darren Grant
"Home" (featuring Phil Collins)	2003	Rich Newey
"Hip Hop Baby"	2005	Brandon Kraines, Dru-Ha
"Intro" / "Fire"	2006	Unknown
"I Tried" (featuring Akon)	2007	Rich Newey
"Lil' L.O.V.E." (featuring Mariah Carey and Bow Wow)	2007	Chris Robinson
"Young Thugs"	2008	Deji LaRay
"D.O.A." (Remix)	2009	Unknown
"Rebirth"	2010	Bobby Yan
"Meet Me In the Sky"	2010	Bobby Yan
"See Me Shine" (featuring Lyfe Jennings, Phaedra and J Rush)	2010	Bobby Yan
"Determination" (featuring Felecia)	2010	Bobby Yan
"Celebration" (Remix) (featuring Game)	2012	Freddie Hott Sauce, Taydoe TV
"Everything 100" (featuring Ty Dolla $ign)	2013	Tha Razor
"20th Year Anniversary Cypher"	2013	AzZ Entertainment, Dhark Knight Media
"More Than Thugs"	2015	Mr. Criminal
