= The Art of War: World War III =

Studio album by Bone Thugs-n-Harmony
- Released: December 10, 2013
- Genre: Hardcore hip hop
- Length: 61:24
- Labels: BTNH; Seven Arts; UMG; Fontana
- Producers: DJ U-Neek; Wundermine

Bone Thugs-n-Harmony chronology
Thuggish II (2010)	The Art of War: World War III (2013)	New Waves (2017)

Professional ratings
Review scores
Source	Rating
Allmusic	3/5 stars

The Art of War: World War III is the ninth studio album by American hip hop group Bone Thugs-n-Harmony. It was released on December 10, 2013, on Seven Arts Music and BTNH Worldwide. The album serves as the sequel to their quadruple platinum double album, The Art of War.

Like previous Bone offerings Thug Stories and Strength & Loyalty, this album features a trio lineup, with two of the five members generally absent from the group at the time of the album's recording. However, this trio consists of Bizzy, Layzie and Flesh, as Krayzie and Wish had temporary left the group while in a state of conflict. Nevertheless, Krayzie and Wish appear on the album due to usage of unreleased tracks previously recorded for Uni5: The World's Enemy.

== Track listing ==
No.	Title	Length
1.	"WWIII (Introduction)"	1:30
2.	"Top Notch"	3:23
3.	"Murda on U" (featuring Don Jagwarr)	3:22
4.	"Born in the Ghetto" (featuring Big B)	4:57
5.	"Bone" (featuring Tanieya Weathington)	3:00
6.	"Bring It Back"	3:56
7.	"Approach 2 Danger"	3:49
8.	"Bitch Iz a Bitch"	2:55
9.	"It's a Bone Thang"	5:00
10.	"100-K"	3:26
11.	"Deep End" (featuring Por'cha)	3:56
12.	"Back in tha Dayz" (featuring Tanieya Weathington)	4:01
13.	"Walk This Way" (featuring Big B)	4:37
14.	"Rapella (Interlude)" (featuring Gray the Beatboxer & Por'cha)	2:17
15.	"Swagged Out"	3:34
16.	"It Will Be Alright" (featuring Por'cha)	4:31
17.	"In Memory of Eazy" (featuring Bruce-E-Bee & Phaedra)	3:10
18.	"Everything 100 (iTunes Bonus Track)" (featuring Ty Dolla $ign)	3:28

== Charts ==
Chart	Peak position
US Independent Albums	36
US Top R&B/Hip-Hop Albums (Billboard)	28
