= Blaze of Glory (Flesh-n-Bone album) =

Studio album by Flesh-n-Bone
- Released: September 13, 2011
- Recorded: 2011
- Genre: Hardcore hip hop, underground hip hop
- Length: 74:39
- Label: FBG Global/RBC Records/ E1 Music
- Producer: DJ U-Neek, Thin C.

Flesh-n-Bone chronology
5th Dog Let Loose (2000)	Blaze of Glory (2011)

Professional ratings
Review scores
Source	Rating
RapReviews	6.5/10

Blaze of Glory is the third studio album from Bone Thugs-n-Harmony member Flesh-n-Bone. Due to his incarceration, it is his first solo release since 5th Dog Let Loose which was released 11 years prior. Two singles were released, "How I Roll Up" and "Heartaches", and promotional videos were made.

== Background ==
In an interview, Flesh-n-Bone said that the album features unreleased group tracks (“Fallin’” and “Can't Take It"), which, at the time, he believed would be the last time that all 5 members of Bone Thugs-n-Harmony would appear on the same track; however, The Art of War: World War III (2013) and New Waves (2017) have tracks with all members.

== Track listing ==
No.	Title	Length
1.	"How I Roll Up"	4:53
2.	"Heartaches"	3:56
3.	"Watch Me"	3:55
4.	"Fortune & Fame"	3:15
5.	"Don't Think About It" (Stew Deez, 50 Cal, and B Loc)	4:23
6.	"All American T.H.U.G."	3:00
7.	"Duct Tape Gang Skit"	0:46
8.	"Duct Tape Gang" (feat. Layzie Bone, Big Sloan, 50 Cal, Big Solo, BG Kat, Lady Dutches, Lil Dawg, and B Loc)	4:25
9.	"Fallin’" (feat. Layzie Bone, Bizzy Bone, and Krayzie Bone)	4:01
10.	"Kick Back"	3:58
11.	"Ain’t Fair"	4:03
12.	"Picture Me Rollin" (feat. Stew Deez)	3:00
13.	"Back"	3:59
14.	"4 Sure" (feat. Big Monster, 50 Cal, and Lil Dawg)	6:15
15.	"Gorilla Hustle" (feat. Big Sloan, Decades, Thin C, B Loc, Stew Deez, 50 Cal, and BG Kat)	5:13
16.	"Paradise"	4:09
17.	"What’s Hood" (feat. Keef G and Stew Deez)	3:31
18.	"Can’t Take It" (feat. Krayzie Bone, Wish Bone, and Layzie Bone)	3:38
19.	"Blaze Of Glory"	4:19
