= 5th Dog Let Loose =

Studio album by Flesh-n-Bone
- Released: October 10, 2000
- Recorded: 1999–2000
- Studios: Studio 56 (Hollywood, CA); The Enterprise (North Hollywood, CA); LAfx (North Hollywood, CA)
- Genres: Hip hop; gangsta rap; horrorcore
- Length: 1:02:11
- Label: Koch
- Producers: Damon Elliott; Erik Nordquist; Flesh-n-Bone; Rhythm D; The Professor

Flesh-n-Bone chronology
T.H.U.G.S. (Trues Humbly United Gatherin' Souls) (1999)	5th Dog Let Loose (2000)	Blaze of Glory (2011)

Professional ratings
Review scores
Source	Rating
AllMusic	2/5 stars
HipHopDX	2/5

5th Dog Let Loose is the second solo studio album by American rapper Flesh-n-Bone. It was released on October 10, 2000, via Koch Records. Recording sessions took place at Studio 56, at LAfx, and at The Enterprise in Hollywood. Production was handled by Damon Elliott, The Professor, Rhythm D, Erik Nordquist, and Flesh-n-Bone himself. It features guest appearances from Layzie Bone, Ms. Chaz, B.G. Knocc Out, Damon Elliott, Kurupt, Montell Jordan and Wish Bone. The album peaked at number 98 on the Billboard 200, number 30 on the Top R&B/Hip-Hop Albums and number 3 on the Independent Albums in the United States.

Word of the album originally surfaced in 1998 with a different title "Book of T.H.U.G.S.", but due to Flesh-n-Bone's incarceration the album wasn't released until two years later with a new name and a new label. Also due to Flesh's incarceration the album was left unfinished. Despite all difficulties, 5th Dog Let Loose is considered by fans and some critics as his crowning achievement.

== Track listing ==
No.	Title	Writer(s)	Producer(s)	Length
0.	"The Last Tru Souljahs" (Intro)	Stanley Howse; Erik Nordquist	Flesh-n-Bone; Erik Nordquist
1.	"Hero"	Stanley Howse; Steward Howse; Jamaal Smith; Jamar Cole; Paul Hardwick; Jesse Mathews; Antyone Red; Jimmy Russell	The Professor	8:12
2.	"Amen" (featuring Montell Jordan)	Stanley Howse; Montell Barnett; The Professor	The Professor	4:58
3.	"Way Back" (featuring Layzie Bone and Ms. Chaz)	Stanley Howse; Steven Howse; Chasitie Howse; Damon Elliott	Damon Elliott	4:38
4.	"If You Could See" (featuring Layzie Bone and Wish Bone)	Stanley Howse; Steven Howse; Charles Scruggs; Elliott	Damon Elliott	3:55
5.	"Word to the Wise"	Stanley Howse; Elliott	Damon Elliott	3:57
6.	"The Master"	Stanley Howse; Elliott	Damon Elliott	4:54
7.	"Say a Little Prayer"	Stanley Howse; C. Howse; Elliott	Damon Elliott	4:34
8.	"Havin' a Ball"	Stanley Howse; Elliott	Damon Elliott	4:18
9.	"Kurupted Flesh" (featuring Kurupt)	Stanley Howse; Ricardo Brown; Elliott	Damon Elliott	5:05
10.	"Deadly"	Stanley Howse; David Weldon	Rhythm D	5:22
11.	"Come Fuck with Me"	Stanley Howse; Elliott; Teddy Harmon	Damon Elliott	4:21
12.	"No Other Like My Kind"	Stanley Howse; Elliott; Harmon	Damon Elliott	3:23
13.	"Silent Night" (featuring B.G. Knocc Out and Damon Elliott)	Stanley Howse; Arlandis Hinton; Elliott	Damon Elliott	4:34
Total length:				1:02:11

Japanese bonus track
No.	Title	Length
14.	"B.Y.O.B."

Unreleased tracks
No.	Title	Length
15.	"Too Greedy"
16.	"Armageddon"

Sample credits

- Track 1 contains elements from "Mama" written by Michael Rutherford, Phil Collins and Anthony Banks
- Track 2 contains elements from "Git Up, Git Out" written by Ray Murray, Patrick Brown, Rico Wade, André Benjamin, Antwan Patton, Cameron Gipp and Robert Barnett
- Track 10 contains replay elements from "It's Funky Enough" written by Tracy Curry and J. Sylvers

== Charts ==
Chart (2000)	Peak position
US Billboard 200	98
US Top R&B/Hip-Hop Albums (Billboard)	30
US Independent Albums (Billboard)	3
