= Thug on da Line =

Studio album by Krayzie Bone
- Released: August 28, 2001
- Recorded: 2000–01
- Studio: The Backroom (Glendale, California); Can-Am (Tarzana, California); Hit Factory Criteria (Miami)
- Genre: Hip hop; gangsta rap; horrorcore
- Length: 1:13:48
- Label: ThugLine; Ruthless; Loud; Epic
- Producer: Krayzie Bone (also exec.); Damizza; Darren "Nitro" Clowers; Def Jef; L.D.; Lofey; L.S.; L.T. Hutton; Super Sako; The Co-Stars; The Neptunes; Tim Feehan; Vachik Aghaniantz; Irv Gotti

Krayzie Bone chronology
Thug Mentality 1999 (1999)	Thug on da Line (2001)	The Legends Underground (Part 1) (2003)

Singles from Thug on da Line
- 1. "Hard Time Hustlin'" Released: May 15, 2001

Professional ratings
Review scores
Source	Rating
AllMusic	4/5 stars
Entertainment Weekly	A−
RapReviews	7.5/10
The New Rolling Stone Album Guide	2/5 stars
The Source	3.5/5 stars
Vibe	4.5/5 marks
XXL	L (3/5)

Thug on da Line is the second solo studio album by American rapper Krayzie Bone. It was released on August 28, 2001 through Thugline/Ruthless/Loud Records under distribution via Epic/Columbia Records and Sony Music. Recording sessions took place at the Backroom in Glendale, at Can-Am Studios in Reseda, and at The Hit Factory Criteria in Miami. Production was handled by L.T. Hutton, Def Jef, Super Sako, Damizza, Darren "Nitro" Clowers, L.D., Lofey, L.S., the Co-Stars, The Neptunes, Tim Feehan, Vachik Aghaniantz, and Krayzie Bone himself, who also served as executive producer. It features guest appearances from LaReece, Asu, K-Mont, Bo$$, The Gunslangers (Keef G, Young Dre the Truth and BAM), Kelis, Knieght Rieduz, Tiffany and Wish Bone. The album peaked at number 27 on the Billboard 200 and number 13 on the Top R&B/Hip-Hop Albums in the United States, and number 33 on the Official New Zealand Music Chart. The first and only single of the album single was "Hard Time Hustlin'" featuring Sade.

== Track listing ==
No.	Title	Writer(s)	Producer(s)	Length
1.	"Ya'll Don't Know Me"	Anthony Henderson; Lenton Terrell Hutton	L.T. Hutton	4:02
2.	"Ride the Thug Line" (featuring The Gunslangers)	Henderson; Keith Griffin; Noah Porter; Andre Terry; Neely Dinkins; Vito Colapietro; Terry Gray	The Co-Stars	4:01
3.	"Can't Hustle 4 Ever" (featuring LaReece and Young Dre the Truth)	Henderson; Kimberly Ward; Terry; Darren Clowers; Gerry Goffin; Michael Masser	Darren "Nitro" Clowers	5:12
4.	"Talk to Myself" (featuring Tiffany)	Henderson; Timothy Feehan; Jalil Hutchins; John Fletcher; Bryan New; Steven Joe Brooks	Tim Feehan	4:03
5.	"A Thugga' Level" (featuring Bo$$ and LaReece)	Henderson; Lichelle Laws; Jeffrey Fortson	Def Jef	4:18
6.	"Da Thugs"	Henderson; Michael L. Sandlofer; Irving Lorenzo	Lofey	3:30
7.	"If They Only Knew" (featuring LaReece)	Henderson; Ward; Paul McCartney	Damizza	3:03
8.	"I Don't Give a Fuck"	Henderson; Fortson	Def Jef	3:31
9.	"Time After Time"	Henderson; Dwight Myers; Theodore Riley	Krayzie Bone	2:41
10.	"Ride If You Like" (featuring LaReece, Asu and K-Mont)	Henderson; Ward; Eloyd Britt; Hutton	L.T. Hutton	4:05
11.	"If You a Thug" (featuring LaReece, K-Mont and Asu)	Henderson; Ward; Jermaine Hargrove; Britt; Sarkis Balasanyan; Vachik Aghaniantz	Super Sako; Vachik Aghaniantz	4:12
12.	"Hard Time Hustlin'"	Henderson; Helen Folasade Adu; Andrew Hale; Stuart Matthewman	Krayzie Bone	4:29
13.	"Gemini"	Henderson; Hutton	L.T. Hutton	3:46
14.	"I Don't Know What" (featuring Kelis)	Henderson; Pharrell Williams; Chad Hugo	The Neptunes	3:44
15.	"Rollin' Up Some Mo'" (featuring LaReece, Asu, K-Mont, Bo$$ and Keef G)	Henderson; Ward; Britt; Hargrove; Laws; Griffin; Dámaso Pérez Prado; David Lubega; Christian Pletschacher	LS	4:27
16.	"Everybody Wanna Be Thugs"	Henderson	L.D.	3:02
17.	"Bloody Murder" (Skit)	Henderson	Krayzie Bone	0:53
18.	"Kneight Riduz Wuz Here" (featuring Knieght Rieduz)	Henderson; Actavius Mills; Richard Drake; Ward	Krayzie Bone	5:18
19.	"Ready for Combat" (Skit)	Henderson	Krayzie Bone	0:28
20.	"Thug on da Line" (featuring K-Mont, LaReece, Asu and Wish Bone)	Henderson; Hargrove; Ward; Britt; Charles Scruggs; Balasanyan; Aghaniantz	Super Sako	5:03
Total length:				1:13:48

Sample credits

- Track 3 contains an interpolation of "Do You Know Where You're Going To (Theme From Mahagony)" written by Michael Masser and Gerry Goffin
- Track 4 contains an interpolation of "Last Night (I Had A Long Talk With Myself)" written by John Fletcher, Jalil Hutchins, Brian New
- Track 7 contains an interpolation of "Girlfriend" written by Paul McCartney
- Track 9 contains an interpolation of "Don't You Know" written by Dwight Myers and Teddy Riley
- Track 12 contains a sample from "Feel No Pain" as recorded by Sade
- Track 15 contains an interpolation of "Mambo No. 5 (A Little Bit Of)" written by Dámaso Pérez Prado, David Lubega and Christian Pletschacher

== Charts ==
Chart (2001)	Peak position
New Zealand Albums (RMNZ)	33
US Billboard 200	27
US Top R&B/Hip-Hop Albums (Billboard)	13
