= Chasing the Devil: Temptation =

2015 studio album by Krayzie Bone

Chasing The Devil: Temptation

Studio album by Krayzie Bone
- Released: November 20, 2015
- Recorded: 2008–2015
- Genre: Hip hop, horrorcore
- Length: 1:09:32
- Label: RBC; Krayzie Bone Media LLC; eOne
- Producer: Krayzie Bone (also exec.)

Krayzie Bone chronology
Gemini: Good vs. Evil (2005)	Chasing The Devil: Temptation (2015)	Thug Brothers 2 (2017)

Singles from Chasing The Devil: Temptation
- 1. "Cloudy" Released: November 03, 2015; 2. "Like Fire" Released: November 18, 2015

Chasing The Devil: Temptation is the fourth studio album by American rapper Krayzie Bone, released on November 20, 2015, under RBC Records.

== Background ==
Krayzie Bone had been working on his fourth album for nearly 8 years, making it the longest time he has ever spent making a record. The album had been delayed several times before its release. Krayzie Bone had also expressed due to the polarizing response to the album title, in an interview with HipHopDX that he "just want to let everybody know what I don’t mean, because there’s a lot of misconceptions of the title. It doesn’t mean that I’m actually chasing the devil. I’m actually talking about certain things that we pursue in life sometimes that have evil motives behind them. You can be chasing the devil if you’re a politician trying to get power. You can be chasing the devil if you’re a normal person trying to get money and fame. I’m not necessarily saying that it’s evil to chase those things, but when you do it and all you think about is being rich or being that person, that’s something totally different."

== Singles ==
The album's lead single, titled "Cloudy", was released on November 3, 2015.

The album's second single, titled "Like Fire", was released on November 18, 2015.

== Track listing ==
All tracks produced by Anthony Henderson.

No.	Title	Writer(s)	Length
1.	"Wicked" (intro)	Anthony Henderson	1:53
2.	"Hold on to Ya Soul" (featuring Phaedra)	Anthony Henderson, Gerard McMahon, Mike Mainieri (original vocals from the song Cry Little Sister)	6:18
3.	"Cloudy"	Henderson	4:12
4.	"Weapons of Mass Distraction"	Henderson	3:05
5.	"The Money, the Power"	Henderson	2:53
6.	"The Devil's Deal"	Henderson	4:06
7.	"Rise of a King (Fall of a Fool)"	Henderson	2:11
8.	"Wake Up! (Skit)"	Henderson	0:31
9.	"Chasing Nightmares"	Henderson	2:53
10.	"Like Fire"	Henderson	4:53
11.	"Loyal"	Henderson	3:47
12.	"A Wise Fool" (featuring Caine)	Henderson; Jamaal Flowers	2:44
13.	"Heart 2 Heart (Domestic Skit)"	Henderson	2:39
14.	"Can't Walk Away" (featuring Flesh-n-Bone)	Henderson; Stanley Howse, Gabe Lopez, Thomas Fiss	4:02
15.	"The Signs (Peace & Security)"	Henderson	2:16
16.	"Send Me an Angel"	Henderson	2:58
17.	"What If?"	Henderson	3:36
18.	"Reasons (Skit)"	Henderson	2:08
19.	"Brand New Everything" (featuring Bizzy Bone)	Henderson; Stanley Howse; Steven Howse; Bryan McCane; Charles Scruggs	4:13
20.	"So Called Friends" (featuring Caine)	Jamaal Flowers; Henderson	1:13
21.	"Ride for Me" (featuring Kief Brown)	Henderson	4:24
22.	"Temptation"	Henderson	1:54
Total length:			01:09:32

Notes

- "Hold On To Ya Soul" features background vocals by Phaedra
- "A Wise Fool" and "So Called Friends" features additional vocals by Caine.
- "Can't Walk Away" features additional vocals by Gabe Lopez, Thomas Fiss and Flesh-N-Bone
- "Brand New Everything" features additional vocals by Bizzy Bone
- "Ride for Me" features additional vocals by Kief Brown

== Charts ==
Chart	Peak position
US Independent Albums	19
US Top R&B/Hip-Hop Albums (Billboard)	27
