= Gemini: Good vs. Evil =

Studio album by Krayzie Bone
- Released: February 8, 2005
- Recorded: 2004–05
- Genre: Hip hop
- Length: 51:52
- Label: Ball'r Records
- Producer: 5150; Dillio; Femi Ojetunde; Fredwreck; Krayzie Bone; Lil' Jon; L.T. Hutton; Rush; The Platinum Brothers; The Wunda Twinz

Krayzie Bone chronology
Leatha Face: The Legends Underground (Part 1) (2003)	Gemini: Good vs. Evil (2005)	Too Raw for Retail (2005)

Singles from Gemini: Good vs. Evil
- 1. "Get'chu Twisted" Released: 2005

Professional ratings
Review scores
Source	Rating
AllMusic	3.5/5 stars
RapReviews	7.5/10

Gemini: Good vs. Evil is the third solo studio album by American rapper and record producer Krayzie Bone. It was released on February 8, 2005 via Ball'r Records. Production was handled by 5150, L.T. Hutton, Lil' Jon, Dillio, Femi Ojetunde, Fredwreck, Rush, The Platinum Brothers, The Wunda Twinz, and Krayzie Bone himself. It features guest appearances from all of his fellow Bone Thugs-n-Harmony groupmates, except Flesh-n-Bone.

The album debuted at number 69 on the Billboard 200 and number 19 on the Top R&B/Hip-Hop Albums chart in the United States. The first week's sales were not as impressive as his previous albums, selling 21,253 first week, but the album had very little promotion. It felt back to the 167th position with 8,042 copies of the next week, followed by a near-to-dropout 196th spot with a low sales of 6,422 totaling 35,717 copies on the chart.

== Track listing ==
No.	Title	Writer(s)	Producer(s)	Length
1.	"Get'chu Twisted"	Anthony Henderson; Jonathan Smith	Lil' Jon	4:36
2.	"That's That Bone" (featuring Wish Bone)	Henderson; Charles Scruggs	5150	3:21
3.	"Put It on Y'all"	Henderson	Dillio	2:39
4.	"Interlude"	Henderson		1:45
5.	"Nuthin' But Music"	Henderson	Fredwreck	3:57
6.	"All I'm Hearing"	Henderson	Krayzie Bone	3:27
7.	"Let's Live"	Henderson; Michael Chesser; Adam Maurice Gibbs	The Platinum Brothers	3:58
8.	"Chaos Interlude"	Henderson		1:30
9.	"Don't Know Why"	Henderson; Jeremy Penick; Daniel Noonan; Ryan Burchfeild; Steve White; Gordon Heckaman; Brad Kane	Rush	3:37
10.	"Mangled"	Henderson; Sean Williams	The Wunda Twinz	1:56
11.	"Lock Down Love"	Henderson; Femi Ojetunde	Femi Ojetunde	3:42
12.	"Slave Skit"	Henderson		1:36
13.	"I Remember"	Henderson	L.T. Hutton	4:33
14.	"Hi-D-Ho"	Henderson; Hutton; William Robinson	L.T. Hutton	2:42
15.	"Murda Music"	Henderson	5150	3:04
16.	"Get'chu Twisted Remix" (featuring Wish Bone, Layzie Bone and Bizzy Bone)	Henderson; Scruggs; Steven Howse; Bryon McCane	Lil' Jon	5:29
Total length:				51:52

== Charts ==
Chart (2005)	Peak position
US Billboard 200	69
US Top R&B/Hip-Hop Albums (Billboard)	19
