= Chasing the Devil =

Chasing The Devil may refer to:

== Film ==
- Chasing the Devil, 2014 American film featuring Elise Eberle

== Books ==
- Chasing the Devil: The Search for Africa's Fighting Spirit, 2010 book by Tim Butcher
- Chasing the Devil: My Twenty-Year Quest to Capture the Green River Killer, 1997 book by Dave Reichert

== Music ==
- Chasing the Devil: Temptation, 2015 studio album by Krayzie Bone
- Chasing the Devil, 1997 album by Tom Rigney, or its title track
- "Chase the Devil", 1976 song by Max Romeo
