= BTNHResurrection =

Studio album by Bone Thugs-n-Harmony
- Released: February 29, 2000
- Recorded: 1999
- Studios: Ruthless Records Recording Studio (Los Angeles); U-Neek's Workshop (Los Angeles); Studio Cat (Los Angeles); Sound Castle (Silver Lake, Los Angeles)
- Genres: Hip hop; gangsta rap; R&B
- Length: 75:53
- Labels: Ruthless; Epic
- Producers: Jimmy "JT" Thomas; Darren Vegas; L.T. Hutton; DJ U-Neek

Bone Thugs-n-Harmony chronology
Collection Volume One & Two (1998/2000)	BTNHResurrection (2000)	Thug World Order (2002)

Singles from BTNHResurrection
- 1. "Resurrection (Paper, Paper)" Released: January 11, 2000; 2. "Change the World" Released: March 22, 2000; 3. "Can't Give It Up" Released: August 29, 2000

Professional ratings
Review scores
Source	Rating
Allmusic	2/5 stars
Entertainment Weekly	B
MVRemix Urban	(7.5/10)
Q	3/5 stars
RapReviews	(8/10)
Rolling Stone	3/5 stars
The Source	4/5 stars

BTNHResurrection is the fourth studio album by American hip hop group Bone Thugs-n-Harmony. The album was released on February 29, 2000, on Ruthless. Sold 280,500 copies in its 1st week of charting on the billboard 200, it reached Platinum status within a month. In its second week, the album dropped to number 5 on the Billboard 200. Flesh-n-Bone was heavily featured on this album, appearing in 14 of the 15 tracks (not including the bonus track) which was rarely seen on previous albums due to him not being signed to Ruthless with the rest of the group. This was Flesh-n-Bone's last appearance on a Bone Thugs-n-Harmony album until 2010 due to his conviction for assault with a firearm and criminal possession of a weapon in June 2000. Pleading guilty, he was sentenced to 11 years in prison, and was released in July 2008, re-appearing on the group's album as a performer on Uni5: The World's Enemy in 2010 unlike his appearance on the last track A Thug Soldier Conversation with DJ Uneek on the Thug World Order album when Flesh was incarcerated.

== Commercial performance ==
The album debuted and peaked at number 2 on the Billboard 200, selling 280,500 copies in its 1st week. In its second week, the album dropped to number 5 on the Billboard 200. The album has been certified platinum by the RIAA for shipping and selling over a million copies in America.

== Track listing ==
Credits adapted from the album's liner notes.

No.	Title	Writer(s)	Producer(s)	Length
1.	"Show 'Em"	Bone; Flesh-n-Bone; Jimmy Thomas	Jimmy "JT" Thomas	5:15
2.	"The Righteous Ones" (featuring David's Daughters)	Bone; Flesh-n-Bone; Darren Hubbard	Darren Vegas	4:32
3.	"2 Glocks"	Bone; Flesh-n-Bone; Thomas	Jimmy "JT" Thomas	4:26
4.	"Battlezone"	Bone; LT Hutton	LT Hutton	4:19
5.	"Ecstasy"	Bone; Flesh-n-Bone; Tim Middleton	DJ U-Neek	5:43
6.	"Murder One"	Bone; Flesh-n-Bone; Middleton	DJ U-Neek	4:15
7.	"Souljahs Marching"	Bone; Flesh-n-Bone; Thomas	Jimmy "JT" Thomas	3:40
8.	"Servin' tha Fiends"	Bone; Flesh-n-Bone; Thomas	Jimmy "JT" Thomas	3:52
9.	"Resurrection (Paper, Paper)"	Bone; Flesh-n-Bone; Thomas	Jimmy "JT" Thomas	5:15
10.	"Can't Give It Up"	Bone; Flesh-n-Bone; Hutton	LT Hutton	5:09
11.	"Weed Song"	Bone; Flesh-n-Bone; Middleton	DJ U-Neek	4:09
12.	"Change the World" (featuring Big B)	Bone; Flesh-n-Bone; Brian Parker; Middleton	DJ U-Neek	4:31
13.	"Don't Worry"	Bone; Flesh-n-Bone; Middleton; Michael Hawkins; Leroy Hutson	DJ U-Neek	5:35
14.	"Mind on Our Money"	Bone; Flesh-n-Bone; Middleton	DJ U-Neek	5:10
15.	"No Way Out"	Bone; Flesh-n-Bone; Thomas	Jimmy "JT" Thomas	5:10
16.	"One Night Stand" (performed by Bizzy Bone)	Bizzy Bone; Hubbard	Darren Vegas	4:53

=== Appearances ===
- Bizzy Bone appears on all tracks.
- Layzie Bone appears on 15 tracks.
- Flesh-n-Bone appears on 14 tracks.
- Krayzie Bone appears on 9 tracks.
- Wish Bone appears on 8 tracks.

Sample credits

- "Don't Worry" contains an interpolation from "So In Love With You", written by Michael Hawkins and Leroy Hutson.

== Music videos ==
- "Resurrection (Paper, Paper)"
- "Change The World"
- "Can't Give It Up"
- "Weed Song"

== Charts ==
=== Weekly charts ===
Chart (2000)	Peak position
US Billboard 200	2
US Top R&B/Hip-Hop Albums (Billboard)	1

=== Year-end charts ===
Chart (2000)	Position
US Billboard 200	63
US Top R&B/Hip-Hop Albums (Billboard)	25

== Certifications ==
Region	Certification	Certified units/sales
New Zealand (RMNZ)	Gold	7,500^{^}
United States (RIAA)	Platinum	1,000,000^{^}
^{^} Shipments figures based on certification alone.
