= Strength & Loyalty =

Studio album by Bone Thugs-n-Harmony
- Released: May 8, 2007 (US)
- Recorded: 2006–2007
- Genre: Hip-hop; gangsta rap; R&B
- Length: 58:49
- Label: Thugline; Mo Thugs; A2Z; Full Surface; Interscope
- Producer: Swizz Beatz (also exec.); Akon; DJ Toomp; Jermaine Dupri; Mally Mall; Neo Da Matrix; Pretty Boy & Bradd Young; Street Radio; The Individuals; Ty Fyffe; will.i.am

Bone Thugs-n-Harmony chronology
| Thug Stories (2006) | Strength & Loyalty (2007) | T.H.U.G.S. (2007) |

Singles from Strength & Loyalty
- 1. "I Tried" Released: February 16, 2007; 2. "Lil Love" Released: July 1, 2007

Professional ratings
Aggregate scores
| Source | Rating |
|---|---|
| Metacritic | (74/100) link |
Review scores
| Source | Rating |
| Allmusic | link |
| AllHipHop | link at the Wayback Machine (archived May 12, 2007) |
| DJBooth | link |
| Entertainment Weekly | (B+) link |
| HHNLive | link at the Wayback Machine (archived May 15, 2007) |
| HipHopDX | link |
| RapReviews | link |
| Rolling Stone | link at the Wayback Machine (archived July 15, 2007) |
| The Source | 4/5 stars |
| XXL | (L) link |

Strength & Loyalty (originally titled The Bone Thugs Story) is the seventh studio album by American hip hop group Bone Thugs-n-Harmony, released on May 8, 2007. It was Bone Thugs-n-Harmony's first major album after an absence of nearly five years. The album contains guest appearances by Akon, Autumn Rowe, Bow Wow, Felecia, Fleetwood Mac (sampled), Mariah Carey, Swizz Beatz, The Game, Twista, will.i.am, and Yolanda Adams. Producers include Akon, DJ Toomp, Jermaine Dupri, Mally Mall, Neo Da Matrix, Pretty Boy & Bradd Young, Street Radio, Swizz Beatz, The Individuals, Ty Fyffe, and will.i.am. The executive producer of the album was Swizz Beatz. Bizzy Bone was not featured on the album. Then imprisoned member Flesh-n-Bone was only featured on a track entitled "Into The Future" which did not make the album and also due to his incarceration did not make the album cover.

The album debuted at #2 on the Billboard 200, with 119,000 copies sold. It has since gone on to be certified gold by the RIAA, having sold over 500,000 copies within the US to date.

The first single was "I Tried", which features Akon, and was also produced by him. The single was released on February 16, 2007. On March 7, the video officially debuted on Yahoo! Music, and on March 17, it debuted on BET's 106 & Park. The second single was "Lil Love", which features Bow Wow and Mariah Carey, and was produced by Jermaine Dupri. The single was released in June 2007, while its video was premiered on July 5, on 106 & Park.

== Critical reception ==
Strength & Loyalty received generally positive reviews from music critics, praising the production of the album and Bone's ability to "reinvent themselves with just 3 members." David Jeffries of Allmusic gave the album 3 and a half stars out of a possible 5, stating "This 2007 edition of Bone is missing members Flesh-N-Bone (thanks to incarceration) and Bizzy Bone (thanks to him being Bizzy Bone) and it shows. As a trio Krayzie, Layzie, and distant third Wish are a solid crew, able to deliver good weekend numbers like "Bump in the Trunk," "Lil Love," and "C-Town" (they never forget Cleveland) along with polished gangsta tracks like "I Tried." In the big picture, Bizzy and Flesh are missed, but what's remarkable about Strength & Loyalty is how it makes the listener forget they're missing while in the moment. Numerous melodious hooks in the easy-rolling Bone tradition fog the memory, and guest stars are brought in at just the right moments. Mariah speaks to the commercial possibilities Bone always had, while the Game speaks to how they seemed to never leave the streets. Every song is at least solid and the album flows very well, making it one of the better-built efforts from the house of Bone in nearly a decade. Problem is, this album could have twice the star power and it wouldn't make up for how important Bizzy's strange voice was for the overall chemistry. Strength & Loyalty doesn't overcome its challenges; it just sidesteps them and works hard to reward fans for a decade of patience. It's as good as it can be, and better than expected." Simon Vozick-Levinson of Entertainment Weekly of gave the album a "B+", stating "These Midwestern-rap pioneers sound more focused than they have in a decade. Much of the credit for the revitalized sound on their seventh LP, Strength & Harmony belongs to producers like Swizz Beatz, will.i.am, and Akon, who deftly flip samples from sources as disparate as Bobby Womack and Fleetwood Mac. Bone Thugs-N-Harmony’s lyrics, too, are impressively crafted, tempering rough bluster with humble spirituality and calling to mind their classic mid-’90s hits — a pleasant surprise after years of diminishing returns." Decades-long Bone heads need not worry about total change, though. On the Neo Da Matrix–tracked gem “C-Town,” fellow spitfire Twista tag teams with the crew atop an airy bed of whistles and sonic hypnosis. The strongest moment of seamless old meets new comes on the head-spinning “Flowmotion,” a remake of a cut from their 1993 indie project Faces of Death. Backed by newcomers the Individuals’ intense strings, all three members’ flows reach new levels of velocity, especially Krayzie's: “I’m coming at you with a sound like thunder, strike like lightning/Hit them and they wonder where these thuggish ruggish niggas came from.”

Matt Baron of XXL (magazine) gave the a "L" (Large) rating, stating "Don’t call it a complete comeback, however. While Krayzie and Layzie show and prove, Wish’s inferior skills frequently emerge as well. Take his infantile wordplay on the Jermaine Dupri–produced radio shot “Little Love” (“Not trying to say that you’re about that paper/But me and you, yes, we’re about that paper”), which makes guest Bow Wow sound superlyrical. Further downgrading the album are scattered, drowsy soundtrack lapses (DJ Toomp's bland bass guitars on “Sounds the Same,” for example) and stunted creativity (the “been there, shot that” murder taunts of “9mm”). Through attempts at experimentation, such as the Fleetwood Mac–sampling rock/rap hybrid “Listen to the Wind Blow,” Bone clearly display a hunger for relevance. And as evidenced by the solemn “Crossroads”-comparable single “I Tried,” their knack for genreless harmonies is still intact. Yet, with the final product sounding slightly uneven, some fine-tuning would have done these Bones good."

== Track listing ==
Credits adapted from the album's liner notes.

| No. | Title | Writer(s) | Producer(s) | Length |
|---|---|---|---|---|
| 1. | "Flowmotion" | Steven Howse; Charles Scruggs; Anthony Henderson; Avery Chambliss; Joseph Alexander; Des Dyer; Clive Scott | The Individualz | 3:09 |
| 2. | "Bump in the Trunk" (featuring Swizz Beatz) | Howse; Scruggs; Henderson; Chambliss; Alexander; Kasseem Dean | The Individualz | 4:25 |
| 3. | "Wind Blow" | Howse; Scruggs; Henderson; Orlando Watson; Bradford Ray; Lindsey Buckingham; Michael Fleetwood; Anne McVie; John McVie; Stephanie Nicks | Pretty Boy; Bradd Young | 4:18 |
| 4. | "I Tried" (featuring Akon) | Howse; Scruggs; Henderson; Giorgio Tuinfort; Aliaune Thiam | Akon; Giorgio Tuinfort (co.) | 4:47 |
| 5. | "Lil' Love" (featuring Mariah Carey & Bow Wow) | Jermaine Dupri; Howse; Scruggs; Henderson; Mariah Carey; Shawntae Harris; James Phillips | Jermaine Dupri; LRoc (co.) | 3:52 |
| 6. | "C-Town" (featuring Twista) | Howse; Scruggs; Henderson; Carl Mitchell; Quaadir Atkinson; John Footman; Terry McFaddin; Frank Wilson | Neo da Matrix | 5:05 |
| 7. | "Order My Steps (Dear Lord)" (featuring Yolanda Adams) | Howse; Scruggs; Henderson; Watson; Ray; Glenn Burleigh | Pretty Boy; Bradd Young | 3:57 |
| 8. | "Streets" (featuring The Game & will.i.am) | Howse; Scruggs; Henderson; William Adams; Jayceon Taylor; Bobby Womack | will.i.am | 4:21 |
| 9. | "9mm" | Howse; Scruggs; Henderson; Jesse Mathews; Kendred Smith | Street Radio | 4:43 |
| 10. | "Gun Blast" | Howse; Scruggs; Henderson; Tyrone Fyffe | Ty Fyffe | 3:37 |
| 11. | "Candy Paint" (featuring Swizz Beatz & Autumn Rowe) | Howse; Scruggs; Henderson; Dean | Swizz Beatz | 3:45 |
| 12. | "So Good So Right" (featuring Felecia) | Howse; Scruggs; Henderson; Jamal Rashid; Brenda Russell | Mally Mall | 3:35 |
| 13. | "Sounds the Same" | Howse; Scruggs; Henderson; Aldrin Davis | DJ Toomp | 4:25 |
| 14. | "Never Forget Me" (featuring Akon) | Howse; Scruggs; Henderson; Tuinfort; Thiam | Akon; Giorgio Tuinfort (co.) | 4:46 |

Best Buy Bonus Track
| No. | Title | Producer | Length |
|---|---|---|---|
| 15. | "Just Vibe" | Pretty Boy | 4:24 |

iTunes Bonus Track
| No. | Title | Producer | Length |
|---|---|---|---|
| 16. | "Bump In The Trunk (Remix)" | Swizz Beatz; The Individualz | 4:12 |

=== Samples ===
| # | Title | Samples |
|---|---|---|
| 1. | "Flowmotion" | "Sky High" by Jigsaw |
| 3. | "Wind Blow" | "The Chain" by Fleetwood Mac |
| 6. | "C-Town" | "Trust in Me" by Lenny Williams |
| 8. | "Streets" | "Across 110th Street" by Bobby Womack |
| 10. | "Gun Blast" | "Living a Lie" by Cam'ron |
| 12. | "So Good So Right" | "So Good So Right" by Brenda Russell |
| 15. | "Just Vibe" (Best Buy Bonus track) | "Why Have I Lost You" by Cameo |

== Unreleased songs ==
- "Assurance" (produced by Polow da Don)
- "Bone Thugs Boys" (produced by Danja) (co-produced by Timbaland)
- "Certified Thugs" (featuring Jazze Pha) (produced by Jazze Pha)
- "Come with Me" (produced by Swizz Beatz)
- "For the OG's" (featuring Chamillionaire) (produced by Play-N-Skillz)
- "Got My Back" (featuring Jodeci) (produced by Play-N-Skillz)
- "I Ain't Satisfied" (produced by Kanye West)
- "Into The Future" (featuring Flesh-n-Bone) (produced by The Platinum Brothers co produced by Travis Cherry)
- "Never Been Industry"
- "Not Familiar"
- "One Day at the Time"
- "Real Niggaz" (produced by Swizz Beatz)
- "Shotgun" (produced by EVontheboards)
- "So Crazy" (featuring Kelly Rowland) (produced by Play-N-Skillz)
- "Struggles" (featuring Petey Pablo) (produced by DJ U-Neek)
- "Toast 2 That" (featuring Swizz Beatz) (produced by Swizz Beatz)
- "We Workin" (produced by DJ Paul & Juicy J)
- "What's Up" (featuring Swizz Beatz) (produced by Swizz Beatz)
- "When the Thugs Come Out" (produced by Swizz Beatz)
- "You & Me" (featuring Gwen Stefani)

== Charts ==
=== Weekly charts ===
| Chart (2007) | Peak position |
|---|---|
| New Zealand Albums (RMNZ) | 28 |
| US Billboard 200 | 2 |
| US Top R&B/Hip-Hop Albums (Billboard) | 2 |

=== Year-end charts ===
| Chart (2007) | Position |
|---|---|
| US Billboard 200 | 120 |
| US Top R&B/Hip-Hop Albums (Billboard) | 53 |

== Certifications ==
| Region | Certification | Certified units/sales |
|---|---|---|
| New Zealand (RMNZ) | Gold | 7,500^{‡} |
| United States (RIAA) | Gold | 500,000^{^} |
^{^} Shipments figures based on certification alone.^{‡} Sales+streaming figures based on certification alone.
