= New Waves =

Studio album by Bone Thugs
- Released: June 23, 2017
- Recorded: 2016–2017
- Length: 46:05
- Labels: BTNH; A2Z; eOne
- Producers: Thomas Deelder (exec.); Steve Lobel (exec.); Damizza (co-exec.); Hugo Langras (co-exec.); Avedon; Clifford Golio; Kyle; Devin; Scott Storch; Dan Book; Diego Ave; Far East Movement; Autolaser; Paul Mayson; King Kanobby

Bone Thugs chronology
The Art of War: World War III (2013)	New Waves (2017)	TBA (2026)

Singles from New Waves
- 1. "Coming Home" Released: March 24, 2017; 2. "If Heaven Had a Cellphone" Released: June 9, 2017; 3. "Fantasy" Released: June 16, 2017

New Waves is the tenth studio album by American hip hop group Bone Thugs. It was released on June 23, 2017, by Entertainment One Music. The album only consists of 2 out of 5 members of Bone Thugs-n-Harmony (Krayzie Bone and Bizzy Bone; a duo simply known as "Bone Thugs"). The album features a large selection of guest appearances, including Stephen Marley, Tank, Jesse Rankins, Kaci Brown, Jazze Pha, the other Bone members (Layzie Bone, Wish Bone and Flesh-n-Bone), Jonathan Davis from nu metal band Korn, Bun B, Uncle Murda, Yelawolf, IYAZ, Eric Bellinger and more.

The album's lead single, "Coming Home", was released on March 24, 2017. New Waves debuted at number 181 on the US Billboard 200.

== Background ==
The album features two of the five members of Bone Thugs-n-Harmony (Krayzie Bone and Bizzy Bone) rapping with their "signature fast-rapping, singing style over an array of new sounds, including EDM and pop-tinged beats".

In an interview with AllHipHop.com Krayzie Bone explained the meaning of the album:

This album is a breath of fresh air coming from Bone. We wanted to give this project a different look. That's where the album title comes from: New Waves. We will always be a group…we will always be Bone Thugs-n-Harmony, but this is different than from the norm. This is Bone Thugs.

— Krayzie Bone, interview with allhiphop.com.

Bizzy Bone also spoke on the creation process of the album and why they decided to choose eOne as the record label for the album:

We love the process of making music so this wasn’t a hard album for us to make. We have so much history with not only eOne Music but with eOne Music President, Alan Grunblatt. He's the same dude we’ve had all our success with since E. 1999 Eternal.

— Bizzy Bone, interview with allhiphop.com.

== Promotion ==
=== Singles ===
The album's lead single, "Coming Home" featuring Stephen Marley was released on March 24, 2017. The song was produced by Damizza and Dutch producers Avedon & Clifford Golio. The song's accompanying music video was released on May 8, 2017.

The album's second single, titled "If Heaven Had a Cellphone" featuring American R&B singer Tank was released on June 9, 2017, accompanied by a music video. The track is a lyrical follow-up to the Bone Thugs-n-Harmony hit “Crossroads”.

The album's third single, titled "Fantasy" featuring Jesse Rankins was released on June 16, 2017, accompanied by a music video.

=== Other songs ===
The music video for "Change the Story" featuring Uncle Murda was released on June 10, 2017. In regards to “Change the Story,” Bizzy said it was important for the group to acknowledge some of the rap legends who've passed on prematurely.

== Critical reception ==
Professional ratings
Review scores
Source	Rating
HipHopDX	(3.7/5)

Aaron Mckrell of HipHopDX gave the album a score of 3.7/5 and wrote: "This ain't your daddy’s Bone. Want ominous ivory tickles and creepy basslines? Too bad; you’re getting thumping bass and soaring robo-rhythms."

== Track listing ==
New Waves
No.	Title	Writer(s)	Producer(s)	Length
1.	"Coming Home" (featuring Stephen Marley)	Anthony Henderson; Bryon McCane; Stephen Marley; Damion Young; Clifford Golio; Vincent van den Ende	Clifford Goilo; Avedon; Damizza^{[a]}	2:55
2.	"If Heaven Had a Cellphone" (featuring Tank)	Henderson; McCane; Durrell Babbs; Jeremy Ryan Hanlon; Brockett Aspniwall Parsons; Vincent van den Ende	Damizza; Avedon	2:39
3.	"Good Person" (featuring Joelle James)	Henderson; McCane; Joelle James; Kyle Guisande; Devin Guisande; Vincent van den Ende	Avedon; Kyle^{[a]}; Devin^{[a]}	2:55
4.	"Fantasy" (featuring Jesse Rankins)	Henderson; McCane; Jesse Rankins; Cimo Fränkel; Rik Anemma; Vincent van den Ende	Avedon; Cimo Fränkel^{[a]}; Rik Anemma^{[a]}	2:40
5.	"That Girl" (featuring Kaci Brown)	Henderson; McCane; Kaci Brown; Vincent van den Ende	Avedon	2:49
6.	"Let It All Out" (featuring Jazze Pha)	Henderson; McCane; Phalon Alexander; Kyle Guisande; Devin Guisande; Dan Book; Vincent van den Ende	Avedon; Kyle^{[a]}; Devin^{[a]}; Dan Book^{[a]}	3:06
7.	"Waves" (featuring Layzie Bone, Wish Bone and Flesh-n-Bone)	Henderson; McCane; Steven Howse; Charles Scruggs; Stanley Howse; Scott Storch; Diego Ave; Vincent van den Ende	Scott Storch; Diego Ave^{[a]}; Avedon^{[b]}	4:12
8.	"Whatever Goes Up" (featuring Jonathan Davis)	Henderson; McCane; Jonathan Davis; Lee Anna McCollum; Clifford Golio	Clifford Golio	3:47
9.	"Cocaine Love" (featuring Bun B and Jesse Rankins)	Henderson; McCane; Bernard Freeman; Jesse Rankins; Kyle Guisande; Devin Guisande; Vincent van den Ende	Avedon; Kyle^{[a]}; Devin^{[a]}	3:22
10.	"Bad Dream" (featuring Iyaz)	Henderson; McCane; Keidran Jones; Kyle Guisande; Devin Guisande; Vincent van den Ende	Avedon; Kyle^{[a]}; Devin^{[a]}	2:43
11.	"Gravity" (featuring Yelawolf)	Henderson; McCane; Michael Atha; Shaunice Jones; Paul Mayson; James Roh; Kevin Nishimura; Virman Coquia; Vincent van den Ende	Far East Movement; Autolaser^{[a]}; King Kanobby^{[a]}; Avedon^{[a]}	3:57
12.	"Bottleservice"	Henderson; McCane; Damion Young; Vincent van den Ende	Avedon; Damizza^{[a]}	2:50
13.	"Change the Story" (featuring Uncle Murda)	Henderson; McCane; Leonard Grant; Diego Ave; Vincent van den Ende; Rachel West	Avedon	4:07
14.	"Ruthless" (featuring Layzie Bone, Flesh-n-Bone and Eric Bellinger)	Henderson; McCane; Steven Howse; Stanley Howse; Eric Bellinger; Kyle Guisande; Devin Guisande; Vincent van den Ende	Avedon; Kyle^{[a]}; Devin^{[a]}	4:03
Total length:				46:05

CD bonus track
No.	Title	Writer(s)	Producer(s)	Length
15.	"Don't Let Go" (featuring Rico Love)	Henderson; McCane; Richard Preston Butler, Jr.; Vincent Berry; Vincent van den Ende	Avedon; Vincent Berry	2:58
Total length:				49:03

Bonus track edition
No.	Title	Writer(s)	Producer(s)	Length
15.	"My Way" (featuring DB Bantino)	Henderson; McCane; Desmond Barnes; Vincent van den Ende	Avedon	2:42
Total length:				48:48

Notes

- ^{^[a]} signifies a co-producer
- ^{^[b]} signifies an additional producer
- "Good Person", "Cocaine Love" and "Bad Dream" contains additional vocals by Kyle and Devin
- "Fantasy" contains additional vocals by Cimo Fränkel
- "Waves" contains additional vocals by Yahusha Kalev
- "Ruthless" contains additional instruments by Wouter Bossen

== Charts ==
Chart (2017)	Peak position
New Zealand Heatseeker Albums (RMNZ)	3
US Billboard 200	181
US Independent Albums (Billboard)	10

== Release history ==
Region	Date	Format(s)	Label	Ref.
Various	June 23, 2017	Digital download; streaming	Entertainment One Music	
Various	June 23, 2017	CD	Entertainment One Music	
