= I Tried =

2007 single by Single by Bone Thugs-n-Harmony featuring Akon

Single by Bone Thugs-n-Harmony featuring Akon

from the album Strength & Loyalty
- B-side: "Bump in the Trunk"
- Released: February 12, 2007
- Genre: Hip hop; R&B
- Length: 4:47
- Label: Interscope; Full Surface; Mo Thugs; A2Z; Thugline
- Songwriter(s): Anthony Henderson; Steven Howse; Charles Scruggs; Aliaune Thiam; Giorgio Tuinfort
- Producer(s): Akon

Bone Thugs-n-Harmony singles chronology
"Don't Stop" / "Fire" (2006)	"I Tried" (2007)	"Lil' L.O.V.E." (2007)

Akon singles chronology
"Don't Matter" (2007)	"I Tried" (2007)	"We Takin' Over" (2007)

Music video
- "I Tried" on YouTube

"I Tried" (also known as "I Tried (So Hard)") is a song recorded by American hip-hop group Bone Thugs-n-Harmony, released in February 2007 as the lead single from their album Strength & Loyalty. This particular song features Layzie Bone, Krayzie Bone and Wish Bone. The song features and was produced by Akon; Giorgio Tuinfort assisted the artists in writing the song.

== Background and composition ==
The song is about the struggles that the members of Bone Thugs-n-Harmony and Akon faced on the streets.

"I Tried" is performed in the key of G♯ minor in common time with a tempo of 82 beats per minute. The song follows a chord progression of D♯m–E–F♯–G♯m, and the vocals in the song span from F♯_{4} to E_{5}.

== Chart performance ==
The song entered the Billboard charts in the issue dated April 7, 2007. It debuted at number eighty-two on the Billboard Hot 100 on the issue date April 14, 2007 and reached number six, making it the highest charting Bone Thugs-N-Harmony single in ten years.

== Music video ==
On March 7, 2007, the music video debuted on Yahoo! and other websites. The video shows the group and Akon performing as well as tells the story of a young man in Cleveland where the group was first formed. The man walks into a grocery store, but at the entrance, he collides with a man running out of the store. The man drops what he had in his hand, revealing money. The money is inferred to be stolen from the store.

The robber runs away, while the young man picks up his bag. A police officer, played by Chris Mulkey, catches him picking up the bag where the money had been dropped. He runs from the police officer, and the officer eventually arrests him. The officer goes to the store to show the owner the arrested suspect. The store owner says the young man did not rob the store, and the officer lets the young man go. The video ends with the man walking away from the store.

The music video was directed by Rich Newey.

On December 31 2007, the video appeared at number 89 on BET's Notarized: Top 100 Videos of 2007 countdown.

== Track listing ==
=== A-side ===
- "I Tried" (featuring Akon)
  1. Clean – 4:51
  2. Dirty – 4:51
  3. Instrumental – 4:51
  4. A cappella – 4:33

=== B-side ===
- "Bumps in the Trunk" (featuring Swizz Beatz)
  1. Dirty – 4:25
  2. Instrumental – 4:24
  3. A cappella – 4:26

== Charts ==
=== Weekly charts ===
Chart (2007)	Peak position
Canada (Canadian Hot 100)	45
New Zealand (Recorded Music NZ)	4
UK Singles (OCC)	69
US Billboard Hot 100	6
US Hot R&B/Hip-Hop Songs (Billboard)	45
US Hot Rap Songs (Billboard)	6
US Pop Airplay (Billboard)	15
US Rhythmic (Billboard)	2

=== Year-end charts ===
Chart (2007)	Position
New Zealand (Recorded Music NZ)	23
US Billboard Hot 100	58
US Ringtones (Billboard)	39
US Rhythmic (Billboard)	26

== Certifications ==
Region	Certification	Certified units/sales
Brazil (Pro-Música Brasil)	Platinum	60,000^{‡}
New Zealand (RMNZ)	Platinum	30,000^{‡}
United States (RIAA)	Platinum	1,000,000^{^}
^{^} Shipments figures based on certification alone.^{‡} Sales+streaming figures based on certification alone.
