= Resurrection (Paper, Paper) =

Single by Bone Thugs-n-Harmony

from the album BTNHResurrection
- Released: January 11, 2000
- Recorded: 1999
- Genre: Hip hop
- Label: Ruthless
- Producer: Jimmy "JT" Thomas

Bone Thugs-n-Harmony singles chronology
"War" (1998)	"Resurrection (Paper, Paper)" (2000)	"Change the World" (2000)

"Resurrection (Paper, Paper)" is a 2000 rap single by American hip-hop group Bone Thugs-n-Harmony, the first single released from their album BTNHResurrection.

== Background ==
The single was to represent what Bone Thugs were doing at the time. There was a lot of speculation that Bizzy Bone was leaving the group and people wanted to know where the band stood. Flesh-n-Bone was featured on the CD version of the song, but did not appear in the video. Even though the single did not perform well on the charts, the song is considered somewhat of a classic by Bone fans because of its well-directed video and memorable instrumentation and lyrics. This is the first of three times that Flesh-n-Bone was featured in a CD version of a song, but not featured in a video. The others were "Can't Give It Up" and "Change the World". However, when the song stops and the group says "Flesh, Flesh we in the Flesh" a view from him rapping in the "East 1999" music video plays behind them.

== Charts ==
Chart (2000)	Peak position
U.S. Billboard Hot R&B/Hip-Hop Singles & Tracks	22

== Certifications ==
Certifications for "Resurrection (Paper, Paper)"
Region	Certification	Certified units/sales
New Zealand (RMNZ)	Gold	15,000^{‡}
^{‡} Sales+streaming figures based on certification alone.
