= Lil' L.O.V.E. =

"Lil L.O.V.E."

Single by Bone Thugs-n-Harmony featuring Mariah Carey and Bow Wow

from the album Strength & Loyalty
- B-side: "Candy Paint"
- Released: July 1, 2007
- Studio: Southside Studios (Atlanta, GA); Legacy Recording Studios (New York, NY)
- Genre: Hip hop; R&B
- Length: 3:55
- Label: Full Surface; A2Z; Thugline; Mo Thugs; Interscope
- Songwriters: Shawntae Harris; Anthony Henderson; Steven Howse; James Phillips; Charles Struggs; Mariah Carey; Jermaine Dupri
- Producer: Jermaine Dupri

Bone Thugs-n-Harmony singles chronology
"I Tried" (2007)	"Lil L.O.V.E." (2007)	"Rebirth" (2009)

Mariah Carey singles chronology
"Say Somethin'" (2006)	"Lil L.O.V.E." (2007)	"Touch My Body" (2008)

Bow Wow singles chronology
"Don't Know About That" (2007)	"Lil L.O.V.E." (2007)	"Hydrolics" (2007)

Music video
- "Lil L.O.V.E." on YouTube

"Lil L.O.V.E." is a song by American hip hop group Bone Thugs-n-Harmony for their studio album Strength & Loyalty (2007). It features singer Mariah Carey and rapper Bow Wow and was released as the second single from the album in 2007. The artists co-wrote the song with Shawntae Harris, James Phillips, and Jermaine Dupri; the latter is also the producer. In the chorus, Carey expresses her need for a 'Lil L.O.V.E' and 'T.I.M.E' from her suspected lover. In the United States, "Lil’ L.O.V.E." was released as a digital download on May 8, 2007. The song was officially released as a single in the U.S. on June 5, 2007.

== Reviews ==
"Lil L.O.V.E." has received very positive reviews from important industrial magazines and websites.

Cinema Blend expresses, "Mariah Carey and Bow Wow join the cause for "Lil L.O.V.E." Mariah reveals she's still plenty relevant and is not vanishing anytime soon. Bow Wow sounds pleased with himself in the song's background, so good for him."

According to Billboard, “… “Lil L.O.V.E.," featuring a melodious and round duet with Mariah Carey, is their 2007 version of the 1998 hit "Breakdown" …"

Additionally, SoundBytes - News4Jax praises Carey, calling her the main focus of the song. "The group can also show a softer side without stooping to syrupy-ness. Mariah Carey's sensual crooning is the first voice you hear on "Lil L.O.V.E." and before listeners know it, they're hooked and drawn into the midst of a seductive club jam. Dupri, who specializes in such designer dance floor material, helms the song's dense, layered keyboard noodling and synthetic bass pattern that while completely formulaic, could've been a contender on the R&B charts if Carey was its sole focus. Instead, the song's potential is blocked by the Thugs' and Bow Wow's loquaciousness on the mic."

== Music video ==
The video was directed by Chris Robinson who last directed Carey in the video for her single "I Know What You Want" with Busta Rhymes.

In the video are guest appearance of Swizz Beatz and Jermaine Dupri.

The video premiered in BET's 106 & Park on July 5, 2007.

== Charts ==
Chart (2007)	Peak position
New Zealand (Recorded Music NZ)	6
US Bubbling Under Hot 100 (Billboard)	17
US Hot R&B/Hip-Hop Songs (Billboard)	66
US Hot Rap Songs (Billboard)	24
US Rhythmic Airplay (Billboard)	22
