= T.H.U.G.S. (Flesh-n-Bone album) =

T.H.U.G.S. (Trues Humbly United Gatherin' Souls)

Studio album by Flesh-n-Bone
- Released: November 19, 1996
- Recorded: 1995–96
- Genre: Hip hop; gangsta rap; horrorcore
- Length: 1:09:10
- Label: Rush Associated Labels
- Producer: Bobby Jones; Damon Elliott; Krayzie Bone; Rhythm D; Ted Harmon; Tony C

Flesh-n-Bone chronology
T.H.U.G.S. (Trues Humbly United Gatherin' Souls) (1996)	From Cleveland 2 Cali (1998)

Professional ratings
Review scores
Source	Rating
AllMusic	3/5 stars

T.H.U.G.S. (Trues Humbly United Gatherin' Souls) is the debut solo studio album by American rapper and Bone Thugs-n-Harmony member Flesh-n-Bone. It was released on November 19, 1996, via Rush Associated Labels & Mo Thugs Records. The album peaked at number 23 on the US Billboard 200, and on number 8 on the Top R&B/Hip Hop Albums. The album was certified gold by the RIAA for a total of 500,000 units/copies.

== Track listing ==
No.	Title	Producer(s)	Length
1.	"Prayer Intro"	Damon Elliott	1:25
2.	"T.H.U.G.S." (featuring Ms. Chaz & Damon Elliott)	Damon Elliott	4:34
3.	"Reverend Run Sermon Interlude" (featuring Run and Monique)	Bobby Jones	1:41
4.	"World So Cruel" (featuring Run, Monique, Ms. Chaz and Jere Jon)	Bobby Jones; Krayzie Bone	5:07
5.	"Northcoast" (featuring Layzie Bone and Tiarra)	Damon Elliott; Ted Harmon	5:19
6.	"Nothin But da Bone in Me"	Tony C	4:47
7.	"The Silence Isn't Over"	Damon Elliott	5:57
8.	"Crazy by the Flesh"	Rhythm D	5:01
9.	"51/50 Skit"	Damon Elliott	0:08
10.	"Mystic Spirits"	Damon Elliott; Ted Harmon	4:56
11.	"Coming 2 Serve You" (featuring B.G. Knocc Out)	Tony C	5:31
12.	"Tha Killin Skit"	Damon Elliott	0:34
13.	"Live Soil" (featuring Afta Maff)	Damon Elliott	5:03
14.	"Sticks and Stones"	Bobby Jones	5:02
15.	"Empty the Clip" (featuring Afta Maff)	Damon Elliott; Ted Harmon	4:37
16.	"No Mercy" (featuring Fat Joe and Big Punisher)	Bobby Jones	4:36
17.	"Playa Hater" (featuring Krayzie Bone and Layzie Bone)	Bobby Jones; Krayzie Bone	4:52
Total length:			1:09:10

== Charts ==
=== Weekly charts ===
Chart (1996)	Peak position
US Billboard 200	23
US Top R&B/Hip-Hop Albums (Billboard)	8

=== Year-end charts ===
Chart (1997)	Position
US Billboard 200	172
US Top R&B/Hip-Hop Albums (Billboard)	93

== Certifications ==
Region	Certification	Certified units/sales
United States (RIAA)	Gold	500,000^{^}
^{^} Shipments figures based on certification alone.
