= T.H.U.G.S. (Bone Thugs-n-Harmony album) =

Compilation album by Bone Thugs-n-Harmony
- Released: November 13, 2007 (U.S.)
- Genre: Hip hop; R&B
- Length: 55:23
- Label: Ruthless
- Producer: Bone Thugs-n-Harmony; DJ U-Neek; David Frederic; Alvin "Stone" Clark; Rick Rock; The CoStars; Noel "Detail" Fisher; LT Hutton

Bone Thugs-n-Harmony chronology
Strength & Loyalty (2007)	T.H.U.G.S. (2007)	Uni5: The World's Enemy (2010)

Professional ratings
Review scores
Source	Rating
Allmusic	2.5/5 stars
AllHipHop	5/10 stars
RapReviews	7.5/10 stars

T.H.U.G.S. is a compilation album by American hip-hop group Bone Thugs-n-Harmony. It was released in 2007 by Ruthless Records. It debuted on the Billboard US 200 at no.73, selling 15,000 in its first week.

== Critical reception ==
T.H.U.G.S. received mixed to positive reviews from music critics. David Jeffries of Allmusic gave the album 2 and a half stars out of five stating, "You don't have to look much farther than T.H.U.G.S. to see why fans complain about Bone Thugs-N-Harmony's quality control department. This set of "13 new songs"—that's what the sticker Ruthless put on initial pressings declared—is filled with titles that are familiar to Bone-loving message-board trollers and Internet traders, but somewhere along the way from leak to official release, the beats changed, often for the worse. Most everything seems to come from 2003 or so, a time when the Bone and Ruthless relationship was falling apart and two years before unpredictable member Bizzy was dismissed from the group. Hearing Bizzy's free-form rhyming and strange delivery during this turbulent time is interesting and a handful of cuts feature memorable lyrics and/or that prime Bone interplay, but there's an overall feeling that the music is unfinished, or maybe even finished years later by someone outside the Bone organization. Take the amateurish beat on "Sweet Jane," which is a serious step down from the leaked version, or "Wildin'," where the music and lyrics just refuse to connect. Sounds like someone pitched down the vocals for both "I'm Bone" and "So Many Places" so they would match the music, but worst of all is the dramatic title cut, which serves as a six-minute meandering intro with almost no vocals. It's a shame this iffy odds-and-ends collection appeared the same year as Bone's major-label comeback, Strength & Loyalty. Luckily, longtime fans have already been trained on how to approach the group's fringe releases, and will lower their expectations accordingly."

Steve 'Flash' Juon of RapReviews gave the album 7 and a half stars out of 10, stating "In the end what's going on here is perfectly obvious after adding all these clues up and listening to songs on T.H.U.G.S. Sooner or later you'll hear something you recognize from another Bone album, or Bone mixtape, or a song that was leaked to the internet around the time of "BTNHResurrection" or "Thug World Order" that for inexplicable reasons never appeared on those CD's. Quite simply this is a desperate Ruthless Records attempting to cash in on all of the available Bone Thugs material they have they could dig up out the vaults or remix to release. As such it's probably not entirely ethical to support an album like T.H.U.G.S., especially as it's likely none of the rappers involved will ever see a dime from it, and yet songs like the DJ Uneek produced "Everyday Thugs" and Rick Rock's "Not That Nigga" are the kind of classic smooth Bone shit fans have come to know and love, and for nostalgia's sake it is good to hear Bizzy reunited with his comrades. This album is right for all the wrong reasons, so the real shame of T.H.U.G.S. is that Bone's current label couldn't acquire these songs from their former label to promote them the RIGHT way. If you know what you're getting into and you're comfortable with the fact this is not really new material, T.H.U.G.S. is an acceptable album released in an appropriately "ruthless" manner."

== Track listing ==
No.	Title	Producer(s)	Length
1.	"T.H.U.G.S"	Bone Thugs-N-Harmony	5:59
2.	"Unstoppable"	Bone Thugs-N-Harmony, David Frederic	5:04
3.	"Nation of Thugs"	Bone Thugs-N-Harmony, Alvin "Stone" Clark	3:49
4.	"Wildin'"	Noel "Detail" Fisher	3:42
5.	"Not That Nigga"	Rick Rock	4:39
6.	"Bone Thug Soldier"	LT Hutton	3:02
7.	"I'm Bone"	The CoStars	4:10
8.	"Sweet Jane"	Bone Thugs-N-Harmony, Noel "Detail" Fisher	4:09
9.	"Everyday Thugs"	Bone Thugs-N-Harmony, DJ U-Neek	4:59
10.	"Don't Waste My Time"	Noel "Detail" Fisher	4:12
11.	"Young Thugs"	Bone Thugs-N-Harmony, Noel "Detail" Fisher	3:44
12.	"Remember Yesterday"	Edward "Self" Hinson	3:34
13.	"So Many Places"	Bone Thugs-N-Harmony, Noel "Detail" Fisher	4:25

=== Appearances ===
- Krayzie Bone appears on all tracks.
- Layzie Bone appears on 12 tracks.
- Bizzy Bone appears on 11 tracks.
- Wish Bone appears on 11 tracks.
