= Thug Stories =

Studio album by Bone Thugs-n-Harmony
- Released: September 19, 2006
- Recorded: 2005–2006
- Genre: Hip-hop; gangsta rap; R&B
- Length: 43:25
- Label: Mo Thugs; ThugLine; A2Z Ent.; KOCH
- Producer: Bone Thugs-N-Harmony (exec.); Steve Lobel (exec.); DJ U-Neek; Kush n Kato; The Platinum Brothers; Kenny McCloud; Steve Pageot; Steve Estiverne; Mally Mall; DJ Mauly T; Ree Dogg; Big Rush; Thin C

Bone Thugs-n-Harmony chronology
Bone 4 Life (2005)	Thug Stories (2006)	Strength & Loyalty (2007)

Professional ratings
Review scores
Source	Rating
Okayplayer	3/5 stars
RapReviews	7.5/10 stars

Thug Stories is the sixth studio album by American hip-hop group Bone Thugs-n-Harmony, released September 19, 2006 on Koch Records. It marked the first time Bone recorded as a trio for a full album, as Bizzy Bone was still ejected from the group. Upon release, the album sold 40,000 units in its first week, eventually peaking at number 25 on the Billboard 200 and number one on the Independent Album Charts. Thug Stories was the group's first major label LP length release since 2002's Thug World Order Ruthless Records. As of April 11, 2007, it has sold 92,465 copies.

== Songs and music ==
Featuring a slightly matured style with this LP, the group leaned more heavily towards its harmonic roots than its "thug" origins. The tracks "She Got Crazy", "So Sad", and "Call Me" center on the members' past and present issues with women; while "Don't Stop", "Do It Again", and "Thug Stories" serve as ex-post-facto anthems. "Fire" boasts of Bone's superior flowing skills while simultaneously showcasing them. Krayzie and Layzie bite into the microphone with their signature rapid-fire delivery on the track "What You See (Reload)" as the album transitions towards a glimpse of The Thugs' evolution. "Stand Not In Our Way" flouts the temptations of "Beelzebub" and touts faith in "Yahweh" in hypnotic fashion. Reggae overtones fuel the sequel "Still No Surrender", while a great disdain for law enforcement ignites the track. The ominous narrative "This Life" rounds out the album with tales of hopelessness and a flavor unique to Bone.

== Track listing ==
No.	Title	Writer(s)	Producer(s)	Length
1.	"Intro"	Steven Howse; Anthony Henderson; Charles Scruggs; Kenneth McCloud; Gary Greenberg	Kenny McCloud; Gary "G-Whiz" Greenberg (co.)	2:01
2.	"Call Me"	Howse; Henderson; Scruggs; Steve Pageot	Steve Pageot	4:47
3.	"Thug Stories"	Howse; Henderson; Scruggs; Mike Chesser; Adam Gibbs	The Platinum Brothers	4:05
4.	"She Got Crazy"	Howse; Henderson; Scruggs; Tim Middleton	DJ U-Neek	3:25
5.	"Don't Stop"	Howse; Henderson; Scruggs; Steven Estiverne	Steven Estiverne	3:09
6.	"Do It Again"	Howse; Henderson; Scruggs; Mally Mall	Mally Mall	3:44
7.	"So Sad"	Howse; Henderson; Scruggs; Ryan Kushner; Bryan Kato	Kush N Kato; Guy Long (co.)	3:27
8.	"Fire"	Howse; Henderson; Scruggs; Marlowe Taylor	DJ Mauly T	4:43
9.	"What You See (Reload)"	Howse; Henderson; Scruggs; Kushner; Kato	Kush N Kato	3:00
10.	"Stand Not in Our Way"	Howse; Henderson; Scruggs; Big Rush	Big Rush	3:52
11.	"Still No Surrender"	Howse; Henderson; Scruggs; Chesser; Gibbs; Korre Williams	The Platinum Brothers; Korre Williams	3:02
12.	"This Life"	Howse; Henderson; Scruggs; Kushner; Kato	Kush N Kato	4:06

Best Buy/Japanese Version Exclusive Tracks
No.	Title	Producer(s)	Length
13.	"Tear the Roof Off" (featuring Keef G & Thin C)	Kush N Kato	2:58
14.	"Cleveland Thug Boyz" (featuring Felecia & Thin C)	Big Rush	3:35
15.	"Our Streetz" (featuring Felecia & Thin C)	Thin C	3:35

Sample credits

- "Do It Again" contains portions of "Let's Do It Again", written by Curtis Mayfield, and performed by the Staple Singers.

== Personnel ==
=== Musicians ===
- Bone Thugs-n-Harmony – vocals
- Chris Ackerman – keyboards
- DJ Mike T – scratching, sound effects, producer, engineer
- Gary "Sugar Foot" Greenberg – percussion, drums, producer
- Steve Pageot – flute, keyboards, producer, engineer, drum programming

=== Production ===
- Steve Begala – engineer
- Steve Estiverne – producer
- David Frederic – engineer, mixing
- Kush Kato – producer
- Steve Lobel – executive producer
- Guy Long – producer
- Mally Mall – producer
- Kenny McCloud – producer
- Big Rush – producer
- Bone Thugs-n-Harmony – executive producer
- Janice Combs – producer
- Ree Dogg – producer

=== Appearances ===
- Krayzie Bone appears on all tracks
- Layzie Bone appears on all tracks
- Wish Bone appears on 11 tracks

== Chart positions ==
=== Album ===
Chart (2006)	Peak position
U.S. Billboard 200	25
U.S. Top Independent Albums	1
U.S. Top R&B/Hip-Hop Albums	7
