= BTNH Worldwide =

American independent record label

- Founded: 2008
- Founder: Bone Thugs-n-Harmony
- Distributors: Warner Bros. Records (2010-2011); RBC Records (2010-present)
- Genre: Hip-hop
- Country of origin: US
- Location: Cleveland, Ohio

BTNH Worldwide is an independent record label started by hip hop group Bone Thugs-n-Harmony. Composed of Krayzie Bone, Flesh-N-Bone, Layzie Bone, Bizzy Bone and Wish Bone, BTNH Worldwide was created because of freedom of album concept not being handled adequately by previous record labels such as Ruthless Records and Interscope Records. BTNH Worldwide is the home for Bone Thugs-n-Harmony and affiliates such as Mo Thugs artist, Mo Thugs West artist and The Life Ent. The new record label has "a brand new platform coming to show what kind of hit-makers they Bone Thugs-n-Harmony are." BTNH Worldwide is a label built to bring the harmonizing sound Bone Thugs-n-Harmony are known for. Without any label politics, they are allowed to expand on their music and make decisions of their own to satisfy the fans. The move to Warner Brothers has not proved fruitful as due to marketing reasons the five members' chosen track list for Uni5: The World's Enemy was later changed to suit the distributor's failed attempt at re-establishing the group in the mainstream.

== History ==
A reunion was first noted when Layzie Bone & Bizzy Bone came out with Part III of the Bone Brother Series, entitled "Bone Brothers III: Bone Thugs-n-Harmony 4 Life". After being kicked out of Bone Thugs in 2003, Bizzy Bone had no involvement in the group's 2007 project, Strength & Loyalty. The February 2008 release of Bone Brothers III gave the first sign to the fans of an upcoming reunion, with Flesh-n-Bone's prison sentence almost over. Krayzie Bone would later reveal him, Wish Bone Layzie Bone and Bizzy Bone had a good conversation at the back of one of their concerts, in which Bizzy Bone came through to host. Flesh-N-Bone was released July 13, 2008 confirming the reunion as all 5 members were back together for the first time in a decade. The 5 have since headed to the studio to deliver to the fans with the Uni-Five.

=== Departure from Full Surface Records and Interscope ===
After the full reunion, Bone Thugs-n-Harmony had announced the return of the rap group. They went straight to work, right after Flesh-n-Bone was released. This drove Interscope off, because they wanted to announce the reunion, although Bone Thugs had done it themselves to their fan-base. With the lack of respect they got now with the reunion and from the 2007 era of Strength & Loyalty, in which they weren't allowed to choose their own songs for the album, Bone Thugs-n-Harmony chose to leave the record labels, in which they were previously signed too. This departure allowed the 5 to create their own label, BTNH Worldwide. Bone Thugs-n-Harmony members can still be seen wearing the Full Surface necklace at shows, but they are not a part of the label, but just representing it. There has been no word from Swizz Beatz (CEO of Full Surface Records) or Jimmy Iovine (Founder of Interscope) of the departure, but Bone Thugs-n-Harmony are fully independent and signed to their own label.

=== Reunion & Warner Bros. Distribution ===
Bone Thugs-n-Harmony presented their first show as a 5-man team for the first time in nearly a decade on November 31, 2008, at the Club Nokia located in Los Angeles, California. After many opening acts from affiliates, Bone Thugs-n-Harmony came out to perform classics from 1994 such as Thuggish Ruggish Bone to their recent hits to I Tried and such. It was a sold-out show, but was a history in the making for hip-hop. The DVD of the show is soon to be released and pre-orders are being taken through Bizzy Bone's official site or a fan-based site, thawasteland.com. After heavy demand, Bone Thugs-n-Harmony went back as a five-man group to cities near the West Coast to fulfil concerts for their fans.

Bone Thugs-n-Harmony have recently linked a deal with Warner Brothers for a distribution link. Being one of the professional labels, Warner Bros. will handle the distribution, promotion and such for BTNH Worldwide. According to Krayzie Bone, "this will allow us to make the music we want". Bone Thugs-n-Harmony's new deal has earned them their new home under Warner Bros. which manages music such as Metallica and other successful artists. However, Warner Bros. failed to promote and distribute their latest album, "Uni5: The Worlds Enemy" to its proper capability, producing a low budget project. As of July 21, 2010, according to Bone Thugs-n-Harmony main producer, DJ U-Neek, the group is no longer a part of Warner Bros. Music Group due to the failure of promotion/marketing of the "Uni5: The Worlds Enemy" album.

== Flesh-n-Bone's legal trouble ==
Not even 8 months after his release from serving a 10-year sentence bid, Bone Thugs-n-Harmony member Stanley Howse, better known as Flesh-n-Bone, found himself in prison again on April 3, 2009. Flesh-n-Bone was stopped by a Santa Clarita Sheriff after seeing reports of a defective tail light. The sheriff claimed to the media, he had found Flesh in possession of a gun and narcotics. Flesh was taken into custody without bail and was set for trial the following Monday. More evidence came clear during the Monday trial, proving Stanley's innocence. The police department had lied to the media of the gun in the possession of Flesh. Stanley's parole order allows police to search his house at any time. The search was caught on film by the police department, but was only filmed before and after the search. The gun was inside a locked suitcase inside Stanley's house, in which the police used a saw to open, which is considered illegal. The gun belongs to Flesh-n-Bone's wife, Isbela Howse, who is a fellow Chicago Police Officer. She had locked it there, while on leave. Flesh-n-Bone obtained a Medical Marijuana Card after his release, which is not hard to get in the state of California. After another trial was held and the District Attorney's office had dismissed the case due to lack of evidence and reasonable encounters with Flesh-n-Bone's accusations.

On March 28, 2010, Flesh-n-Bone was once again arrested during a hometown concert in Cleveland, Ohio. He was arrested on two outstanding warrants, stemming from domestic abuse and gun charges in 1999 in the Ohio state. This arrest interrupted the Cleveland concert, as fans had to see the concert cut short due to the shut down and arrest. Approximately 100 police officers were on scene to arrest Flesh-n-Bone and maintain the concert and the fans. He was released on a $10,000 bail, and eventually paying a $150.00 fine.

Flesh-n-Bone was on probation until late 2010/early 2011, after serving a 10-year sentence.

== Roster of BTNH Worldwide ==
=== Artists ===
- Bone Thugs-n-Harmony (CEOs)
  - Krayzie Bone
  - Layzie Bone
  - Bizzy Bone
  - Wish Bone
  - Flesh-n-Bone

=== Managed Producers/DJs ===
- DJ U-Neek
- DJ Dre Ghost
- Flesh-n-Bone
- Krayzie Bone
- Thin C
- Pozition
- Wes~Nile The Genius
- Gold Ru$h
- DSP
- Pulse
- David 'The Rainman' Banta
- LR

== Labels ==
=== Mo Thugs Records ===
- Layzie Bone (Founder & Former CEO)
- Krayzie Bone (Former member)
- Wish Bone (Former member)
- Flesh N Bone (Former member)
- Poetic Hustla'z (Former members)
- Graveyard Shift (Former members)
- Souljah Boy (Former member)
- Ken Dawg (Former member)
- II Tru (Former members)
- Tre' (Former members)
- Felicia (Former member)
- Thug Queen (Former member)
- Powder P (Former member)
- Skant Bone (Former member)
- Thin C (Former member)
- Potion (Former members)
- MT5 (Former members)
- Kahpone Bone (Former member)
- Black Hole Of Watts (Former members)
- Desperados (Former members)
- Emortal Thugs (Former members)
- MT5 (Former members)
- J Bone (Former member)
- Freaky-G (Former member)
- Seldom Seen (Former member)
- Bino (Mo Thugs South)
- DJ Ice (Former member)
- J-HAZE (Mo Thugs Pittsburgh Former Member)

=== ThugLine Records ===
- Keef-G (Former member)
- LaReece (Former member)
- K-Mont (Former member)
- Relay (Former members)
- Asu (Former member)
- Bam (Former member)
- Lil Chico (Former member)
- Young Dre The Truth (Former member)
- The Gunslangaz (Former members)
- Knieght Riduz (Former members)

=== 7th Sign Records (Defunct) ===
- Bizzy Bone (CEO)
- Demetrius Whodini Blak Reynolds (Administration)
- Mr. Majesty (Former member)
- H.I.T.L.A.H. Capo Confuscious (Deceased)
- Nina Ross (Deceased)
- Baby Phil
- Q Loco (Incarcerated)
- Mrz Loco
- V-Slim
- AC Killer
- Prince Rasu (Deceased)
- King Josiah (Former member)
- Jahni Denver (Former member)
- Michael Piccard (Former member)
- Sub From RAW
- Prince ZaLu
- Half Deezy

=== The Life Entertainment ===
- Krayzie Bone (CEO)
- Wish Bone (Co-CEO)
- Keef-G
- Pozition
- Caine
- Mookie Motonio
- Lady Smoker
- Nova The Rebel
- Habbit and Frankii
- Wes~Nile The Genius (Producer)
- LR (Producer)
- Tiyana Payne (Former Member)
- Sin Marlee (Former member)
- Duke Terrell (Former member)
- Shutter Boy aka $hutter (Former member)
- GMBoyz (Former members)
- Typhoon (Former member)
- MastaMindz (Former members)
- June 5 (Former members)
- Rory Graham (Audio Engineer)

=== F.B.G. (Flesh-N-Bone Global) ===
- Flesh-n-Bone (CEO)
- Stew Deez
- Big Solo
- BG Kat
- Locomotion
- Lady Dutches
- Lil Dawg
- Piff-n-Bonez
- Solo MacGyver

=== Harmony Howse Entertainment ===
- Layzie Bone (CEO)
- Flesh-n-Bone
- Big Sloan
- Rocky Rock
- Felecia
- Ken Dawg
- DJ Caipo
- Havik
- Vice Verseca (the twins)
- Bloodline Harmony

== Releases ==
The roster first release from their new record label is their reunion album "Uni5: The Worlds Enemy", an album that marks the return of Bizzy Bone and the release of Flesh-n-Bone after serving a 10-year prison term. Distribution and promotion will be handled by Warner Bros.

=== Bone Thugs-n-Harmony albums ===
- 2009: The Fixtape Vol. 3: Special Delivery
- 2010: Uni5: The World's Enemy
- 2013: The Art of War: World War III

=== Bone Brothers albums ===
In recent interviews, there were hints of more albums to come through BTNH Worldwide, either through group work, solo or affiliate wise. No release date have been set for the project. Mentions go to the following:

- 2011: Bone Brothers IV (Layzie Bone & Bizzy Bone)
- TBA: Krayzie By The Flesh (Flesh-n-Bone & Krayzie Bone)
- TBA: The Howse Boys (Layzie Bone, Flesh-n-Bone, Other Howse Family Members)

=== Solo albums ===
- 2008: The Fixtape Vol. 1: Smoke on This (Krayzie Bone)
- 2010: The Fixtape Vol. 2: Just One Mo Hit (Krayzie Bone)
- 2010: The Fixtape Vol. 3: Lyrical Paraphernalia (Krayzie Bone)
- 2011: Blaze of Glory (Flesh-n-Bone)
- 2011: The Definition (Layzie Bone)
- 2011: The Meaning (Layzie Bone)
- 2011: The Fixtape Vol. 4: Under The Influence (Krayzie Bone)
- 2014: The Wonder Years (Bizzy Bone)

=== Bone Thugs-n-Harmony affiliate albums ===
- Shelved: Khaki's & Chuck's (Big Sloan)
- Shelved: Here I Come (Felecia Lindsey-Howse)
- Shelved: Mo Thug Brothers: Mo' Thug Collective Album (Mo Thugs)
- Caine - addiction (The Life)
- Pozition - Lyrical Cardio (The Life)
