= Medical cannabis card =

Authorization document

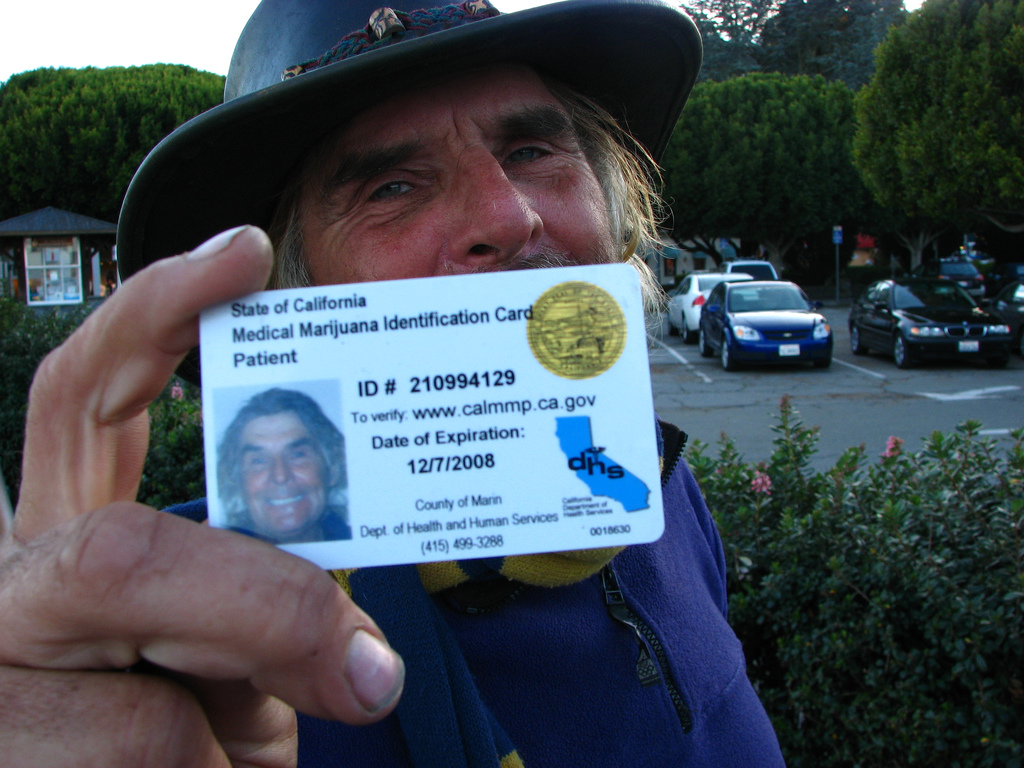
A medical cannabis card in California

A medical cannabis card or medical marijuana card is a state-issued identification card that enables a patient with a doctor's recommendation to obtain, possess, or cultivate cannabis for medicinal use despite marijuana's lack of the normal Food and Drug Administration testing for safety and efficacy. These cards are issued by a state or county in which medical cannabis is recognized. Typically a patient is required to pay a fee to the state in order to obtain a medical marijuana card. Sometimes it is alternatively referred to as medical marijuana identification (MMID), or medical marijuana (MMJ).

In most states with medical marijuana card programs, the card is valid for up to 12 months and may be renewed. It usually needs another evaluation by the doctor and required to pay card fee again which costs less than initial registration. Legal states also have different requirements for obtaining a medical marijuana card. Medical marijuana cards in the United States are currently possible to obtain in 33 states, including 10 states with legalized recreational marijuana such as Washington, Colorado, California, and Massachusetts.

The process of acquiring medical marijuana card may vary with the specific State's Law and policies. Each of the 30 states does not have unique requirements for obtaining medical marijuana card.

== See also ==
- Medical cannabis in the United States
