= Uni5: The World's Enemy =

Studio album by Bone Thugs-n-Harmony
- Released: May 4, 2010
- Recorded: 2008–10
- Genres: Hip hop; R&B
- Length: 58:07
- Labels: BTNH; Asylum; Reprise; WMGreen
- Producers: DJ U-Neek; FATBOI; L. T. Hutton; Desmond "DSP" Powell; Krayzie Bone; Thin C; Pooh Bear; King David

Bone Thugs-n-Harmony chronology
T.H.U.G.S. (2007)	Uni5: The World's Enemy (2010)	Thuggish II (2010)

Singles from Uni5: The World's Enemy
- 1. "See Me Shine" Released: October 20, 2009; 2. "Rebirth" Released: February 15, 2010; 3. "Meet Me in the Sky" Released: March 22, 2010; 4. "Gone" Released: April 13, 2010

Uni5: The World's Enemy is the eighth studio album by American hip-hop group Bone Thugs-n-Harmony released on May 4, 2010, on BTNH Worldwide, Asylum Records and Reprise Records. The mixtape The Fixtape Vol. 3: Special Delivery features cuts from this album.

== Singles ==
The first single, "See Me Shine", featuring Lyfe Jennings, was produced and co-written by Excel Beats who was also the original creator of the song which was created in 2005. It was released by Bone on October 20, 2009. The second single from the album was "Rebirth", featuring Thin C, released on February 15, 2010. The song was produced by Pooh Bear and King David. The third single, "Meet Me in the Sky", was released on March 22, 2010. "Gangsta's Glory" was released as a free download on the group's official website on January 28, 2010. The song was produced by Matt Velo. The album version of "See Me Shine" is different from the earlier released single version, in that it does not feature Phaedra and Lyfe Jennings.

== Background ==
On July 13, 2008, Flesh-n-Bone was released from prison, welcomed back by the rest of the group together. On November 28, 2008, all five members performed live at an event at Club Nokia in Los Angeles for the first time since Flesh's incarceration. The event was sold out and thousands of fans listened to the group perform memorable songs from several of their albums, including unreleased music. Later that night on the groups MySpace page, a bulletin press release was posted, finally announcing the official release date of their new album project, Uni-5. The album had an initial release date of September 22, 2009 but had been pushed back several months. Layzie confirmed that the album should be out on May 4, 2010. In an exclusive interview on HipHopDX.com, Bizzy Bone was enthusiastic about the new musical style with 10-20 tracks recorded and over 200 tracks already being completed. They have left their label, Interscope Records, to form under a brand new label distributed by Warner Bros. called Bone Thugs-N-Harmony Worldwide, which is where the new album "Uni-5: The World's Enemy" was produced and released.

== Reception ==
Professional ratings
Review scores
Source	Rating
Allmusic	3.5/5 stars
HipHopDX	3.5/5 stars
RapReviews	5.5/10 stars
XXL	(XL)

=== Commercial reception ===
The album sold 30,000 copies in its first week of release and debuted on #14 on the Billboard 200. The album has sold over 90,000 copies

=== Critical reception ===
Uni5 received mixed to positive reviews from music critics. XXL Magazine gave it an XL rating, while the allmusic.com gave the album 3 1/2 stars. HipHopDX also gave Uni5 3 1/2 stars, stating "If BTNH over a different type of backdrop (thus providing more variety to their catalog) is what a listener was after, then Uni-5 will be satisfying. If someone wants another taste of Creepin on ah Come Up, the group's latest will only feel average in comparison." David Jeffries of Allmusic illustrated in a 3 1/2-star rated review "With estranged brother Bizzy back in the fold, Uni5: The World's Enemy reunites the original five members of Bone Thugs-N-Harmony after 10 years apart, but it’s not a return to form by any stretch of the imagination. This eighth studio effort leans toward radio-friendly numbers and proper grown-man tracks, with the core four members offering life lessons as Bizzy gives his Biblical perspective. The closest they come to the old days is the opening, “Rebirth,” a chugging juggernaut of an anthem that mixes thunderous production with a hook-filled chorus and those quick, whip-snap verses Bone built their name on. Momentum builds as the album’s lyrical highlight “See Me Shine” gives way to the dark, cursed, and Bizzy-less “Only God Can Judge Me,” which features gospel choir singers and demonic voices melting into a truly unsettling production. “Wanna Be” is bland until Bizzy’s grand moment comes while damning the music industry with “I see women given their bodies like David Letterman love you/Strugglin’ and Husslin’, slangin’ tapes on the Internet” then “Sorry I meant to tell you just what just masters do” and exiting on “Only Jesus can make you a star.” His interests are obviously elsewhere as the rest of Bone try to craft a veteran hip-hop album that can crossover, but Bizzy acting as the group’s mystical and mysterious Flavor Flav is an interesting twist, and he lights every track he lands on. Krayzie Bone's contribution is worth mentioning as he turns in a handful of innovative productions, but the prize goes to producer and Mo Thugs associate Thin C and his mellow, smoker’s delight “My Life.” Like so many family reunions the album is a mix of naturally flowing moments and awkward ones, but when it clicks, that Bone magic is, in effect, making this a necessary listen for the faithful."

== Track listing ==
No.	Title	Writer(s)	Producer(s)	Length
1.	"The Law (Intro)"		DJ U-Neek	1:00
2.	"Rebirth"	Steven Howse; Anthony Henderson; Charles Scruggs; Stanley Howse; Bryon McCane; Jason Boyd	Pooh Bear; King David	7:15
3.	"See Me Shine" (featuring Jay Rush)	Excel Beats; Howse; Henderson; Scruggs; Howse; McCane	Excel Beats	6:04
4.	"Only God Can Judge Me"	Howse; Henderson; Scruggs; Howse; McCane; L. T. Hutton	Hutton; Krayzie Bone	4:13
5.	"Wanna Be"	Howse; Henderson; Scruggs; Howse; McCane; Desmond "DSP" Powell	Powell	5:18
6.	"My Life"	Howse; Henderson; Scruggs; Howse; McCane	Thin C	4:49
7.	"Everytime"	Howse; Henderson; Scruggs; Howse; McCane; Hutton	Hutton; Krayzie Bone	5:34
8.	"Fearless (Interlude)"	U-Neek	U-Neek	0:34
9.	"Gone" (featuring Ricco Barrino)	Howse; Henderson; Scruggs; Howse; McCane; L. Douglas; K. Washington	Fatboi	4:29
10.	"Meet Me in the Sky" (featuring K Young)	Howse; Henderson; Scruggs; Howse; McCane; Hutton	Hutton; Krayzie Bone	5:16
11.	"Universe"	Howse; Henderson; Scruggs; Howse; McCane; T. "DJ U-Neek" Middleton	U-Neek	3:44
12.	"A New Mind = a New Life (Interlude)"	U-Neek	U-Neek	0:44
13.	"Pay What They Owe"	Howse; Henderson; Scruggs; Howse; McCane; Middleton	U-Neek	5:26
14.	"Facts Don't Lie"	Howse; Henderson; Scruggs; Howse; McCane; Middleton; A. Green; A. Jackson; W. Mitchell	U-Neek	3:42

iTunes additional tracks
No.	Title	Writer(s)	Producer(s)	Length
15.	"My Street Blues"		DJ U-Neek	5:30
16.	"Vegas"		Machinedrum, Brian Kennedy	4:15
17.	"Interview" (video)			18:00
18.	"Rebirth" (music video)	Steven Howse; Anthony Henderson; Charles Scruggs; Stanley Howse; Bryon McCane; Jason Boyd	Pooh Bear; Kind David	4:19
19.	"See Me Shine" (music video)			4:25
20.	"Meet Me in the Sky" (music video)			5:15

Notes

- "The Law (Intro)" and "Fearless (Interlude)" features vocals by Jared Scott.
- "Only God Can Judge Me" features backing vocals by Chris Bolton, Octavia Place and Patricia Lee.
- "A New Mind = a New Life (Interlude)" features vocals by Martii Garcia.
- "Vegas" features vocals by K Young.

Sample credits

- "Universe" contains interpolation of "I'm Still In Love With You" by Al Green.

== Samples ==
- "My Street Blues"
  - "Theme From Hill Street Blues" by Mike Post
- "Universe"
  - "I'm Still in Love with You" by Al Green
- "Pay What They Owe"
  - "Real Love" by Lakeside

=== Appearances ===
Krayzie Bone, Layzie Bone and Flesh-n-Bone appear on 11 tracks. Bizzy Bone and Wish Bone appear on 8 tracks.
