= Bone Thugs-n-Harmony =

American hip-hop group

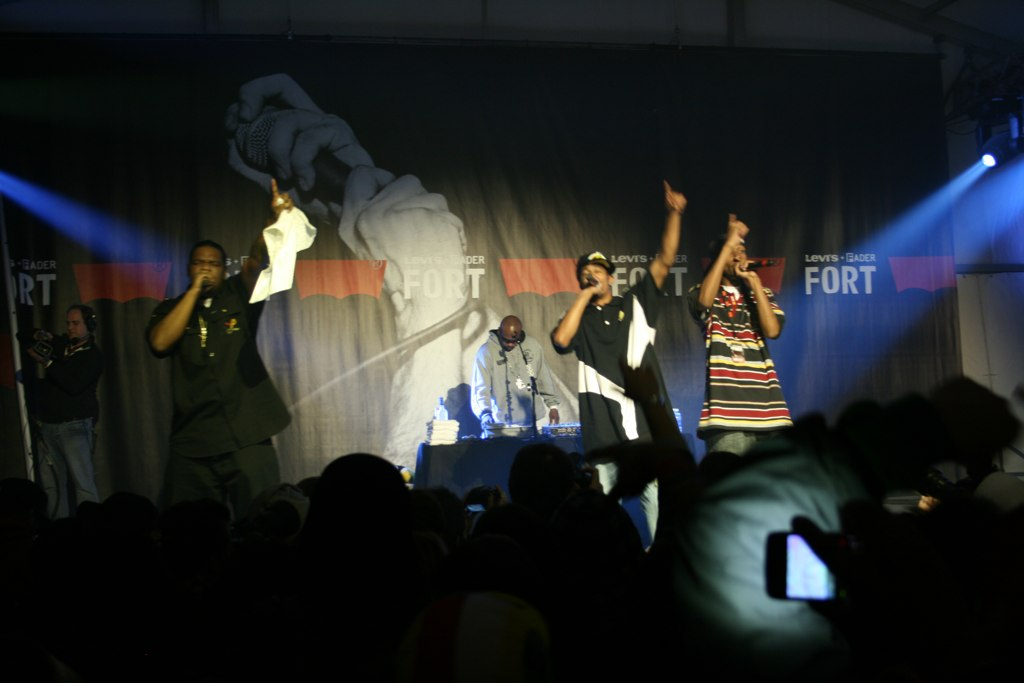
- Bone Thugs-n-Harmony performing in 2010

Background information
- Also known as: Band Aid Boys; B.O.N.E. Enterpri$e
- Origin: Cleveland, Ohio, U.S.
- Genres: Hip-hop; gangsta rap; chopper; R&B
- Works: Bone Thugs-n-Harmony discography
- Years active: 1991–present
- Labels: eOne; Ruthless; BTNH; Full Surface; Warner; Universal; Interscope; Greenback Records
- Spinoffs: Mo Thugs
- Members: Bizzy Bone; Krayzie Bone; Layzie Bone; Wish Bone; Flesh-n-Bone

Bone Thugs-n-Harmony (or simply Bone Thugs; formerly B.O.N.E. Enterpri$e) is an American hip-hop group formed in 1991 in Cleveland, Ohio. Consisting of rappers Bizzy Bone, Wish Bone, Layzie Bone, Krayzie Bone, and Flesh-n-Bone, Bone Thugs-n-Harmony are known for helping pioneer the chopper rap style and the use of rap-singing in popular music. They are frequently cited as one of the greatest rap groups;

The group signed with American rapper Eazy-E's Ruthless Records in late 1993 and made their debut with the EP Creepin on ah Come Up the following year. In 1995, they released their second album, E. 1999 Eternal, which included the hit singles "1st of tha Month" and "East 1999". Their song "Tha Crossroads", a tribute to Eazy-E, spent eight consecutive weeks atop the Billboard Hot 100 and earned them a Grammy Award in 1997. The group's third album, The Art of War, was released in 1997. In 2000, their album BTNHResurrection was certified platinum by the Recording Industry Association of America on March 29, 2000, within a month of its release. Their 2002 album, Thug World Order, was a more modest commercial follow-up, debuting at No. 12 on the Billboard 200. In 2026, the group received a star on the Hollywood Walk of Fame.

== History ==
=== 1993: B.O.N.E. Enterprise early years ===
Formed in Cleveland, Ohio, in 1991, the group was originally called "Band Aid Boys". Wish Bone (Charles C. Scruggs) joined the trio of Krayzie Bone, Layzie Bone, and Bizzy Bone (later stylizing his name as Wi$h Bone), and the group recorded an album titled Faces of Death under the name B.O.N.E. Enterpri$e after an obsolete Inglewood, California based group Layzie Bone was associated with. The album was recorded in the studio of their then-mentor, Kermit Henderson, and released on his indie label Stoney Burke in 1993. Like so many aspiring rappers around the country, they put in calls to executives at record companies, hoping to find someone who would listen. In hopes of securing a record deal, the group was given an audition over the phone, receiving an unfulfilled promise from rapper Eazy-E to call them back. Determined to reach him, they scrounged together the money for one-way bus tickets to Los Angeles. They left for a three-day Greyhound trek and spent four months on the city streets, putting in frequent calls to find him. Nothing came of their search except the news that Eazy-E was, in fact, on his way to Cleveland for a show.

The quartet returned to Ohio, where Diego Blak (born Diego Hodge), a marketer and promoter who had been co-executive producer of Faces of Death, introduced them to Eazy-E at a concert he promoted in Compton. There, on November 2, 1993, they auditioned for Eazy in his dressing room; Krayzie performed his verse of "Flow Motion" from the Faces of Death album, and Eazy was impressed. B.O.N.E Enterpri$e then traveled back to Los Angeles after the Cleveland show to seal the deal. At this point, Eazy renamed them Thugs-n-Harmony, but as they wanted to keep the Bone name, they made their name Bone Thugs-n-Harmony. Eazy signed the group (minus Flesh-n-Bone) to his label Ruthless Records.

=== 1994: Creepin on ah Come Up ===
Released in June 1994, Creepin on ah Come Up was Bone Thugs-n-Harmony's debut with Ruthless. The album's subject matter was focused almost entirely on violent criminal activity. Peaking at No. 12 on the Billboard Top 200 Albums chart and No. 2 on the Top R&B/Hip-Hop Albums chart, it included the hit singles "Thuggish Ruggish Bone" and "Foe tha Love of $", the second of which featured a verse by Eazy-E. "Thuggish Ruggish Bone" peaked at No. 20 on the Billboard Hot 100 chart and No. 2 on the Hot Rap Tracks chart, and "Foe tha Love of $" peaked at No. 39 on the Hot 100 and No. 4 on Rap Tracks. After a slow start that saw the album's success limited to gangsta rap audiences, it broke through to the mainstream. The EP marked a major change in style for the group, as they now fully embraced the G-funk common in West Coast hip-hop of the time. Beats were supplied by DJ Yella, Rhythm D, and Kenny McCloud, and it was the group's first collaboration with newcomer producer DJ U-Neek, who would craft the group's signature sound by producing the majority of their next two albums. For over a year, Eazy-E nurtured their career, continuing to serve as their executive producer and teaching them the business skills he had taught himself over the years.

The growing relationship was cut short, however, when Eazy-E died on March 26, 1995, from complications from AIDS-related pneumonia. Briefly, the young rappers thought they had lost everything with the loss of their friend and mentor. However, the group's potential was apparent, and Ruthless Records continued to support them.

=== 1995–1997: E. 1999 Eternal and The Art of War ===
In 1995, the group's second album, E. 1999 Eternal, was released. It included the singles "1st of tha Month", which peaked at No. 12 on the Hot 100 and No. 4 on Hot Rap Tracks and "Tha Crossroads" which reached No. 1 on both the Hot 100 and Hot Rap Tracks charts. "Tha Crossroads" was the highest-debuting rap single ever when it entered the national singles chart at No. 2, and a week later rose to No. 1, matching the Beatles' "Can't Buy Me Love" for the fastest rise to the top of the chart. The song earned them a Grammy Award. The album generally saw positive reviews from critics as Bone had diversified its content and musical style. Critics were particularly intrigued by the album due to Bone Thugs-n-Harmony's ability to reduce the banality associated with gangsta rap in their music at a time when the subgenre had become exceedingly cliché. A considerable portion of the album's concept was built upon violent subject matter, yet they also incorporated deeper themes, as its songs dealt with more spirituality and occult mysticism. The album was produced by DJ U-Neek (with co-production from Tony C. and Kenny McCloud). E. 1999 Eternal also introduced Bone's trademark tracks devoted entirely to the use of marijuana. The album name originated from one of the street names of a corner (E. 99th street and St. Clair) that was a familiar hangout to Bone members, as well as Eazy-E's album Eternal E. Naming it after Eazy-E's album was just another way of showing respect and tribute to the rapper who had helped them reach success. Also in 1996, Flesh-n-Bone became the first member of the group to release a debut album, titled T.H.U.G.S., which the RIAA certified gold on February 12, 1997. In 1996, due to their success, the Cleveland clan established their own label, Mo Thugs Records, and released the Family Scriptures compilation album to introduce many of the Cleveland-based and other artists whom they were developing. E. 1999 Eternal is the group's most commercially successful album; the RIAA certified it four-times platinum on July 15, 1996. The Art of War and the Creepin on ah Come Up EP were also later certified four-times platinum.

There were plans for Bone Thugs-n-Harmony to collaborate with West Coast rapper 2Pac on a studio album titled One Nation. The project brought hip-hop artists from all areas of the American map such as Boot Camp Clik, OutKast, Scarface, E-40, and more. However, 2Pac was shot and killed in September 1996 so the album never came into fruition. Bootlegs of songs produced while 2Pac was still alive have been distributed.

In 1997, the group released the double-disc set The Art of War. Bone explored a variety of subjects and styles, with focus on God and family and an overall ambient, mellow sound. The group incorporated violent lyrics, however, with a large portion of the album dedicated to what they labeled "clones" who claimed Bone had stolen their quick-tongued rapping style and vice versa. The album had been rumored to be titled "DNA Level C" which is Cleveland backward. The single "Look into My Eyes" appeared on the soundtrack of the film Batman & Robin. It peaked at No. 4 on the Hot 100 and No. 2 on the Hot Rap Tracks chart. "If I Could Teach the World", the other single from The Art of War, peaked at No. 20 on the Hot 100 and No. 3 on the Hot Rap Tracks, and won an American Music Award. The album also included "Thug Luv" with Tupac Shakur.

=== 1998–2001: The Collection: Volumes One & Two, BTNHResurrection and controversies ===
In June 1998, during a public debate over rap lyrics after the 1998 Westside Middle School shooting, a teacher told lawmakers that one of the perpetrators, Mitchell Johnson, had repeatedly listened to Bone Thugs-n-Harmony and Tupac Shakur in the months before the shooting. In 2002, the Supreme Court of Missouri upheld prosecutors' use of the group's song "Mo' Murda" as evidence during the sentencing of Michael Tisius, who had already been convicted of murdering two jailers. They also released The Collection and The Collection: Volume Two, with both compilation albums containing various hits the group had produced from the mid 90s to the early 2000s.

In 2000, Bone Thugs-n-Harmony released BTNHResurrection, featuring the single "Resurrection (Paper, Paper)", which peaked on the Hot R&B/Hip-Hop Songs chart at No. 52. The album's first half featured a slew of hardcore and dark tracks, with the second half being considerably more introspective and soft. Other singles from the album, including "Can't Give it Up", failed to crack the Billboard Hot 100, and the big-budget video for "Change the World" failed to receive any rotation. This was their first group album to prominently feature Flesh-n-Bone, whose presence had been limited on previous releases because he had never signed with the group's label, Ruthless Records. In June 2000, a Los Angeles jury convicted Flesh of assault with a firearm and a related weapons charge. That September, he was sentenced to 11 years in prison.

The group again began having public disputes with Bizzy Bone. Bizzy Bone abstained from promoting BTNHResurrection because he felt that Ruthless Records owed him money. He dropped a million-dollar lawsuit he had filed against Sony Music and Loud Records in exchange for a termination of his Sony contract. Three members of Bone Thugs-n-Harmony released solo albums in 2001: Bizzy Bone with The Gift, Layzie Bone (under the name L-Burna) with Thug by Nature, and Krayzie Bone with Thug on da Line.

=== 2002–2006: Thug World Order and Thug Stories ===
In 2002, the group released Thug World Order. This album, comprising what were described "politically slanted" songs, saw a drastic change in subject matter and tone for the group. The lyrics were almost completely void of any violence, while a larger number of tracks focused on the group itself. In contrast, several songs originally intended to be included on the album that were leaked after its release portrayed a much different album. The album debuted at No. 12 on the Billboard 200. The first single released from the album was "Money, Money" and the second was "Get Up & Get It", featuring 3LW. The third single, "Home", which featured Phil Collins performing part of his song "Take Me Home", peaked at No. 33 on the Rhythmic Top 40, impacting the charts in a number of countries, most notably the United Kingdom. Bizzy Bone was expelled from the group in January 2003, leaving only 3 active members: Krayzie Bone, Layzie Bone, and Wish Bone. Thug World Order was also Bone Thugs-n-Harmony's final album with Ruthless Records.

Thug Stories, Bone Thugs-n-Harmony's seventh album, was recorded on Koch Records and released on September 19, 2006. It marked the first time Bone Thugs-n-Harmony had recorded as a trio since they released an internet-only EP album called Bone 4 Life in September 2005. Thug Stories featured a slightly more mature style, and the group leaned more heavily towards its harmonic roots than its "thug" origins. The album sold 38,000 in its first week and peaked at No. 25 on the Billboard 200 and No. 1 on the Independent Albums chart.

=== 2007–2008: Strength and Loyalty and T.H.U.G.S. ===
Originally to be titled The Bone Thugs Story, Strength & Loyalty was released on May 8, 2007, on Interscope Records imprint Full Surface Records. Being their first major album after an absence of nearly five years, the album debuted at No. 2 on the Billboard 200, and No. 1 on iTunes and the Billboard urban music charts. The album contains guest appearances by Mariah Carey, the Game, will.i.am, Akon, Twista, Bow Wow, Yolanda Adams, and Felecia. Producers on the album included Swizz Beatz, Akon, Pretty Boy, Bradd Young, DJ Toomp, Jermaine Dupri, will.i.am, and others. The executive producer of the album was Swizz Beatz. The first single was "I Tried", which was their first top-10 hit in 10 years, peaking at number 6 on the U.S. Billboard Hot 100. The second single was "Lil Love", which failed to reach the success of its predecessor. The album has been certified gold by the RIAA.

2007 also saw the release of the semi-autobiographical film I Tried, directed by Rich Newey, which explored what might have happened to Bone Thugs-n-Harmony had they not gotten their break with Eazy-E. Released on September 25, Layzie, Krayzie, and Wish Bone starred in the film, playing fictionalized versions of themselves. Also in 2007, Bone Thugs-n-Harmony won the American Music Award for Favorite Rap/Hip-Hop Band, Duo or Group.

T.H.U.G.S., an album featuring previously unreleased, largely remixed Bone Thugs-n-Harmony songs that hadn't made the final cut of BTNHResurrection and Thug World Order, was released on November 13, 2007, by their former record label Ruthless Records. Although the album embodies old tracks, there are some notable changes: new beats, distorted production, voice manipulation, and new song titles. The sole single off the album was "Young Thugs", which was accompanied by a newly filmed music video featuring Krayzie, Layzie, Bizzy, and Wish. The album was criticized as a cash grab.

In November 2007, Layzie Bone confirmed that he had completed Bone Brothers III with Bizzy Bone, spurring speculation about a full Bone reunion. In a video interview, Krayzie Bone stated that they all wanted to reunite, but that record label issues might prevent an official reunion.

After nearly a decade of incarceration, Flesh-n-Bone was released from prison on July 13, 2008. In an interview, Bizzy confirmed his return, the group having reunited in time for Flesh's release.

=== 2009–2013: Uni5: The World's Enemy and The Art of War: World War III ===
Bone Thugs-n-Harmony's five members officially returned with their new album Uni5: The World's Enemy, released on May 4, 2010, by their own record label BTNH Worldwide, with distribution by Warner Bros. Uni5 also marks the return of long-time Bone collaborator DJ U-Neek, who was absent from 2007's Strength & Loyalty but had produced for the group throughout their career, including hits "Thuggish Ruggish Bone" and "Tha Crossroads". They released the singles "See Me Shine", featuring Jay Rush and Lyfe Jennings, and "Rebirth", featuring Thin-C, a member of the Mo Thugs. A third single, "Meet Me in the Sky", was released on March 22.

Throughout 2011, Krayzie Bone, Bizzy Bone, and Layzie Bone spoke about many projects coming in 2012. Those projects were to include an anniversary album featuring all five members; a Bizzy/Krayzie duet album; and compilation albums of unreleased Bone Thugs-n-Harmony material from the mid to late 1990s and 2000s, prospectively titled Lost Archives Vol. 1. The group put their differences aside to reunite and belatedly mark their 20th anniversary at the Rock the Bells festival series of summer 2012.

During Summer 2012, West Coast rapper Game sampled Bone Thugs-n-Harmony's "1st Of Tha Month" on his posse cut "Celebration", with the group's blessing. Game also posted a picture on Twitter showing the word "bone" constructed out of cannabis. He later confirmed that he was working in the studio with Bone Thugs-n-Harmony on a remix of "Celebration" for his album Jesus Piece.

In early November 2013, Krayzie Bone told HipHopDX that Art of War III would feature Layzie, Bizzy, and Flesh-n-Bone and that neither he nor Wish Bone had recorded material for the project. The Art of War: World War III was released on December 10, 2013.

=== 2014–present: New Waves, Greenback Records, and later activity ===
On July 15, 2014, it was announced that Bone Thugs-n-Harmony would release their final album in 2015. There would be only a single copy released, to be auctioned off, with bidding starting at $1 million. The group also announced they would be conducting a 20-country world tour beginning in December 2014. The following day, Krayzie Bone revealed that the album would be titled E. 1999 Legends. He then told XXL that he had approached the group about a reunion album in the middle of the previous year, and they had begun recording it at the end of 2013. Krayzie estimated that Bone Thugs-n-Harmony probably recorded 75 to 100 songs since they began work on the album, which was planned as a double-disc project. The first disc was to contain Bone Thugs-n-Harmony content exclusively, with no features, and would have 18–20 songs. The second disc was planned to feature a large number of big-name guest appearances such as Mariah Carey, Kendrick Lamar, Phil Collins, Wiz Khalifa, Drake, A$AP Mob, and Linkin Park, along with beats from Dr. Dre and DJ U-Neek, who had each been tapped for the album. Damizza would be producing/overseeing the entire E. 1999 Legends album, which was projected to be distributed through Damizza's Baby Ree Records label.

In August 2014, Krayzie said the group had received its first bid of at least $1 million for E. 1999 Legends. On February 14, 2015, producer and long-time Bone collaborator Damizza officially presented the single "More Than Thugs".

In 2017, Krayzie Bone and Bizzy Bone announced that they would release their long-awaited duet album together titled New Waves under the name Bone Thugs. The album's lead single "Coming Home" featuring Stephen Marley was released on March 24. Krayzie confirmed that the full Bone Thugs-n-Harmony group was working on a new album, but said that they would no longer be auctioning off the album's rights. All five members of the group appeared on rapper Wiz Khalifa's 2018 album Rolling Papers 2, each contributing a verse to the song "Reach for the Stars". In early 2020, the group announced that they were changing their name to Boneless Thugs-n-Harmony in a promotion for Buffalo Wild Wings. Bizzy Bone later dismissed that the change was anything serious.

On April 25, 2025, the group released "Aww Shit" through Greenback Records, a label founded by mixed martial arts fighter Conor McGregor. The song was the first to feature all five members since 2010's Uni5: The World's Enemy and was presented as the first single from a forthcoming album. As of November 2026, that album had not been released.

On May 28, 2025, the group appeared on the final episode of Everybody's Live with John Mulaney, after an earlier failed attempt to book them inspired John Mulaney's monologue. In August 2025, they were on the lineup for the 25th annual Gathering of the Juggalos in Thornville, Ohio, and postponed a planned joint tour with Three 6 Mafia to 2026.

On July 8, 2026, all five members received a star on the Hollywood Walk of Fame in the recording category, the 2,851st star on the Walk, at 6126 Hollywood Boulevard. Later that year, the group joined the Wu-Tang Clan as a supporting act on the fall North American leg of the Wu-Tang Forever: The Final Chamber tour.

== Discography ==
Studio albums

- Faces of Death (1993)
- E. 1999 Eternal (1995)
- The Art of War (1997)
- BTNHResurrection (2000)
- Thug World Order (2002)
- Thug Stories (2006)
- Strength & Loyalty (2007)
- Uni5: The World's Enemy (2010)
- The Art of War: World War III (2013)
- New Waves (2017)

== Awards and honors ==
On July 8, 2026, Bone Thugs-n-Harmony received a star on the Hollywood Walk of Fame. About.com ranked them No. 12 on its list of the 25 Best Rap Groups of All Time, and MTV called them "the most melodic hip-hop group of all time".

=== American Music Awards ===
Year	Nominee / work	Award	Result
1996	Bone Thugs-n-Harmony	Favorite Rap/Hip-Hop Artist	Nominated
1997	Bone Thugs-n-Harmony	Favorite Rap/Hip-Hop Artist	Nominated
1998	Bone Thugs-n-Harmony	Favorite Rap/Hip-Hop Artist	Won
2007	Bone Thugs-n-Harmony	Favorite Rap/Hip-Hop Band, Duo or Group	Won
2007	Strength & Loyalty	Favorite Rap/Hip-Hop Album	Nominated

=== Grammy Awards ===
Year	Nominee / work	Award	Result
1996	E. 1999 Eternal	Best Rap Album	Nominated
1996	"1st of tha Month"	Best Rap Performance by a Duo or Group	Nominated
1997	"Tha Crossroads"	Best Rap Performance by a Duo or Group	Won

=== Soul Train Music Awards ===
Year	Nominee / work	Award	Result
1995	Creepin on ah Come Up	Best Rap Album	Nominated
1996	E. 1999 Eternal	Best Rap Album	Nominated
1997	"Tha Crossroads"	Best Video of the Year	Won

=== Source Awards ===
Year	Nominee / work	Award	Result
1995	Bone Thugs-n-Harmony	Best New Rap artist (group)	Nominated
1995	Thuggish Ruggish Bone	Single of the Year	Nominated

=== Billboard Music Awards ===
Year	Nominee / work	Award	Result
1996	Tha Crossroads	Best R&B song	Nominated
1996	Tha Crossroads	Clip of the Year	Won
1999	Ghetto Cowboy (as a featured artist)	Top Rap Song	Nominated

=== MTV Video Music Awards ===
Year	Nominee / work	Award	Result
1996	Tha Crossroads	Video of the Year	Nominated
1996	Tha Crossroads	Best Group Video	Nominated
1996	Tha Crossroads	Best Rap Video	Nominated
1996	Tha Crossroads	Best Special effects in video	Nominated
1996	Tha Crossroads	Viewer's Choice	Nominated
