= Flesh-n-Bone =

American rapper (born 1973)

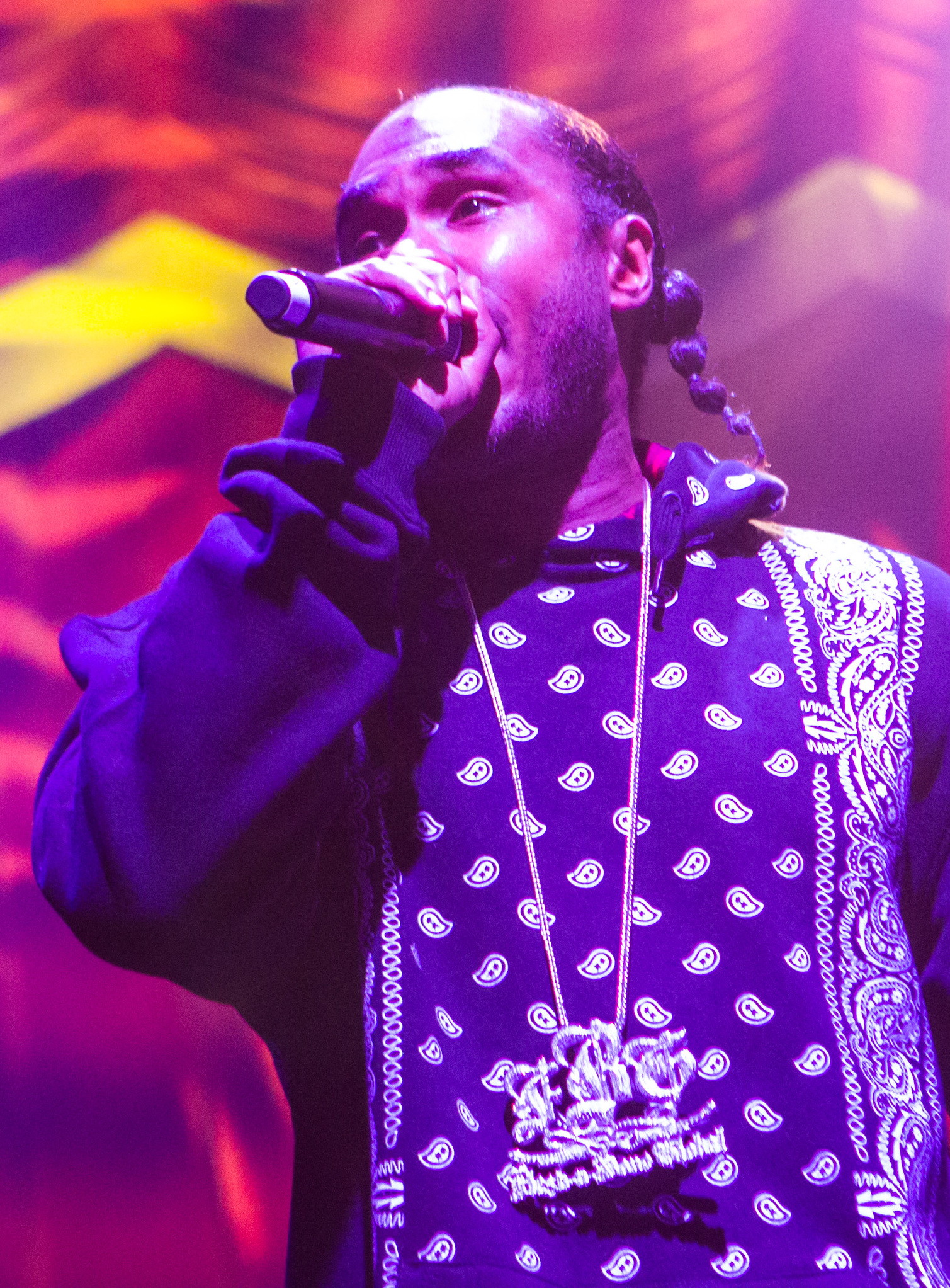
- Flesh-n-Bone in 2015

Background information
- Born: Stanley Howse; June 10, 1973 (age 53)
- Origin: Cleveland, Ohio, U.S.
- Genres: Hip-hop; gangsta rap
- Occupations: Rapper; singer; songwriter
- Years active: 1991–2000; 2008–present
- Labels: BTNH Worldwide; Flesh-n-Bone Global; Mo Thugs; Def Jam; Koch
- Website: web.archive.org/web/20110408155805/http://www.fleshnboneglobal.com/biography.asp

Stanley Howse, better known as Flesh-n-Bone (born June 10, 1973), is an American rapper known as a member of the hip hop group Bone Thugs-n-Harmony. He is the older brother of Layzie Bone and cousin of Wish Bone.

== Legal troubles ==
In December 1999, Flesh-n-Bone was involved in a dispute with one-time friend Tarrance Vickers. During the dispute, Flesh-n-Bone threatened Vickers with an AK-47 rifle. The presiding Van Nuys Superior Court Judge deemed Howse's life story "one of the worst cases of child abuse she had ever read, full of beatings and other physical, emotional, and mental traumas." Flesh-n-Bone apologized and took responsibility for his actions and pleaded guilty. On September 22, 2000, Howse was sent to Pleasant Valley State Prison for 12 years on charges of assault with a deadly weapon and violation of probation. He was also required to undertake an anger-management course.

== Discography ==
=== Solo albums ===
- T.H.U.G.S. (Trues Humbly United Gatherin' Souls) (1996)
- 5th Dog Let Loose (2000)
- Blaze of Glory (2011)
- Do You (2020)
- To the Bone (2022)
- Living Legend, EP (2023)
