= Krayzie Bone =

American rapper (born 1973)

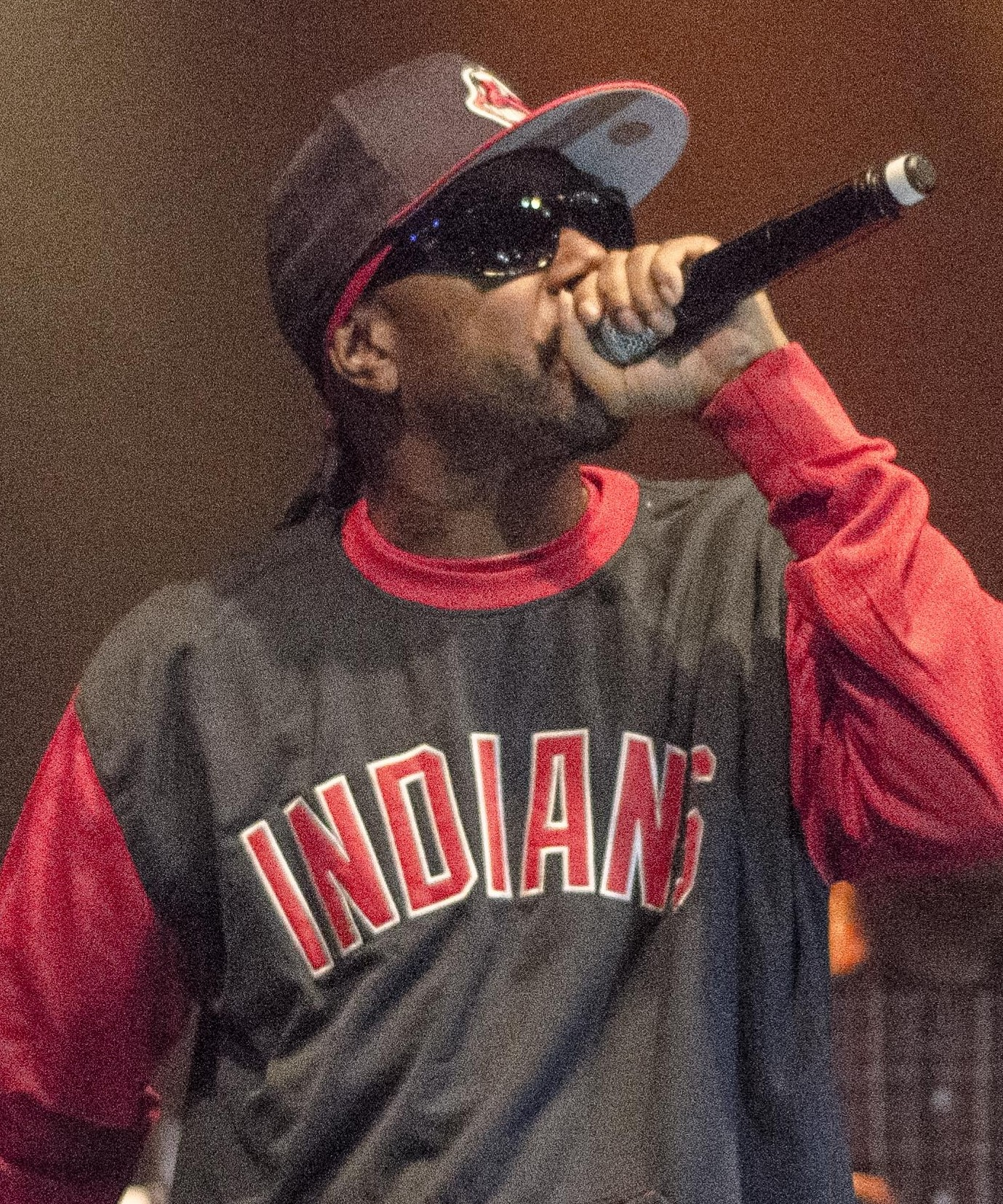
- Krayzie Bone performing in 2015

Background information
- Born: Anthony Henderson; June 17, 1973 (age 53); Cleveland, Ohio, U.S.
- Genres: Hip hop; gangsta rap; horrorcore
- Occupations: Rapper; singer; songwriter; record producer; entrepreneur; businessman; investor; podcaster
- Years active: 1991–present
- Labels: Ruthless; Mo Thugs; ThugLine; The Life; Full Surface; Interscope; BTNH Worldwide; Warner Music Group; E1; Real Talk
- Member of: Bone Thugs-n-Harmony; Mo Thugs

Anthony Henderson (born June 17, 1973), better known as Krayzie Bone, is an American rapper. He is a member of the hip-hop group Bone Thugs-n-Harmony.

== Career ==
=== Solo ===
After finding success with Bone Thugs-n-Harmony, Krayzie Bone recorded his solo debut, Thug Mentality 1999, in 1999. The album was released as a double disc set, featuring a large selection of guest appearances, including Bone Thugs-n-Harmony, Mo Thugs, Mariah Carey, ThugLine, The Marley Brothers, Big Pun, Fat Joe, Cuban Link, Gangsta Boo, E-40, 8 Ball & MJG, Kurupt, Naughty By Nature and Snoop Dogg. The album was largely produced by multi instrumentalist Romeo Antonio and was certified platinum by the RIAA.

In 2001, Krayzie Bone released Thug On Da Line, which received generally positive reviews from music critics and went gold.

In 2005 Krayzie Bone was featured in the song "Ridin'" by Chamillionaire. "Ridin'" was awarded "Best Rap Performance by a Duo or Group" at the 49th Annual Grammy Awards. It was also nominated for Best Rap Song. It became number one in December on the Piczo Chart 3 months after its physical release. The song also topped the Billboard Hot 100 and peaked at number 2 on the UK Singles Chart when it was released there. The song ranked #3 on Rolling Stone's "100 Best Songs of 2006" and #91 on VH1's "100 Greatest Songs of Hip Hop". It was the best selling ringtone in 2006, with 3.2 million sales, certified by the RIAA as the first multi-platinum Mastertone artist in history. It was also awarded the last Best Rap Video at the MTV Video Music Awards, which was awarded in 2006.

During an April 2014 press conference, Krayzie Bone announced that the first installment of the Chasing the Devil trilogy album would be released July 22, 2014 by RBC Records. However, it was pushed back and ultimately released on November 20, 2015.

=== Business ===
Aside from music, Krayzie Bone has since then ventured into the business world. He was a founding member of Mo Thugs Family, a collective of Cleveland-based rap and Hip-Hop musical acts. He broke apart from the group in 1999 to form ThugLine Records, or TL. He had administrated the label to fellow Bone Thugs member Wish Bone as its president and co-CEO. The group has presently reunited and continue to tour as a whole. In many videos he can be spotted wearing a chain that says TL. In 2010, the name ThugLine Records was changed to The Life Entertainment. In order to reach out to more artists and identify the best talent for the label, Conquer The Industry was developed as an internet channel to help up and coming music artists break into the music industry. As a part of his entrepreneurial drive, Krayzie Bone launched a clothing and accessory line named "TL Apparel" which is a direct tie to his music. Many of his fans support his clothing line as they joined him in the grand opening of the store in Los Angeles. In 2018 Krayzie Bone signed a deal to distribute his digital media company,"Krayzie Bone Media" with The Digital Soapbox Network. His first show "Quick Fix"-The Afterhours was his first project with the network.

=== Verzuz and aftermath ===
Most recently, Krayzie Bone has found renewed public interest after Bone Thugs-n-Harmony battled long time rivals Three Six Mafia in one of the more notable Verzuz showdowns. With his name back in the spotlight, Krayzie Bone has seized this opportunity to start the "Spread the Love" foundation, a venture in which investments are used to help the youth excel in music and arts within the Cleveland community. On the music side of things, Krayzie Bone teamed up with Fatlip (of The Pharcyde) to assist on the lead single, "Dust in the Wind," from the album Sccit & Siavash The Grouch Present… Torpor. The single dropped on February 18, 2022 and marks the first time a member of Bone Thugs collaborated with a member of The Pharcyde.

== Personal life ==
Henderson comes from a fourth generation family of Jehovah's Witnesses, and as such does not celebrate Christmas. He believes many rappers are unintentionally following the agenda of the Illuminati.

On September 24, 2023, Krayzie Bone was admitted to a hospital in Los Angeles after coughing up blood in his sleep, what was later attributed to sarcoidosis. Doctors were unsuccessful in an emergency surgery. On September 26, he was sedated due to a main artery in his lung leaking. However, on October 3, he announced he had recovered from the ailment.

Krayzie Bone is spearheading a project called the Harmony District, a mixed-use development expected to begin construction in 2025 in the Glenville neighborhood of Cleveland.

== Discography ==
=== Solo albums ===
- Thug Mentality 1999 (1999)
- Thug on da Line (2001)
- The Legends Underground (Part I) (2003)
- Gemini: Good vs. Evil (2005)
- Chasing the Devil: Temptation (2015)
- Eternal Legend (2017)
- Quick Fix: Level 2 (2019)
- Leaves of Legends (2021)
- Krayzie Melodies: Melodious, Vol. 1 (2022)
- QuickFix : Level 3 : Level Up (2023)
- Chasing the Devil: Chapter 2- "Salvation" (2024)

=== Collaboration albums ===
- Thug Brothers 2 with Young Noble (2017)
- New Waves with Bizzy Bone (2017)
- Thug Brothers 3 with Young Noble (2017)

== Awards ==
=== Grammy Award ===
- 1997: "Best Rap Performance by a Duo or Group" (Tha Crossroads) (with Bone Thugs-n-Harmony)
- 2007: "Best Rap Performance by a Duo or Group" (Ridin') (with Chamillionaire)
