= Billboard Year-End Hot Black Singles of 1989 =

American music chart

This is a list of Billboard magazine's Top Hot Black Singles of 1989.

No.	Title	Artist(s)
1	"Superwoman"	Karyn White
2	"Keep On Movin'"	Soul II Soul
3	"So Good"	Al Jarreau
4	"Shower Me with Your Love"	Surface
5	"Don't Make Me Over"	Sybil
6	"Something in the Way (You Make Me Feel)"	Stephanie Mills
7	"Baby Come to Me"	Regina Belle
8	"Love Saw It"	Karyn White
9	"Wild Thing"	Tone Loc
10	"Start of a Romance"	Skyy
11	"Back to Life (However Do You Want Me)"	Soul II Soul
12	"Me Myself and I"	De La Soul
13	"Dreamin'"	Vanessa Williams
14	"Congratulations"	Vesta
15	"Closer Than Friends"	Surface
16	"Remember (The First Time)"	Eric Gable
17	"Spend the Night (Ce Soir)"	The Isley Brothers
18	"Can U Read My Lips?"	Z'Looke
19	"My Fantasy"	Guy
20	"It's No Crime"	Babyface
21	"Girl You Know It's True"	Milli Vanilli
22	"Miss You Much"	Janet Jackson
23	"Turned Away"	Chuckii Booker
24	"This Time"	Kiara and Shanice
25	"Real Love"	Jody Watley
26	"Roni"	Bobby Brown
27	"Dial My Heart"	The Boys
28	"Oasis"	Roberta Flack
29	"Just Because"	Anita Baker
30	"Every Little Step"	Bobby Brown
31	"Put Your Mouth On Me"	Eddie Murphy
32	"Can You Stand the Rain"	New Edition
33	"On Our Own"	Bobby Brown
34	"Pull Over"	LeVert
35	"I Like"	Guy
36	"Have You Had Your Love Today"	The O'Jays
37	"Let Go"	Sharon Bryant
38	"Him or Me"	Today
39	"Tumblin' Down"	Ziggy Marley and the Melody Makers
40	"Taste of Your Love"	E.U.
41	"Can't Get Over You"	Maze
42	"Lucky Charm"	The Boys
43	"Everything I Miss at Home"	Cherrelle
44	"All I Want Is Forever"	James "J.T." Taylor and Regina Belle
45	"They Want Money"	Kool Moe Dee
46	"Just Coolin'"	LeVert featuring Heavy D
47	"Batdance"	Prince
48	"Straight Up"	Paula Abdul
49	"Mr. DJ"	Joyce "Fenderella" Irby featuring Doug E. Fresh
50	"Sweet, Sweet Love"	Vesta
51	"I'll Be There for You"	Ashford & Simpson
52	"She Won't Talk to Me"	Luther Vandross
53	"The Lover in Me"	Sheena Easton
54	"Two Wrongs (Don't Make It Right)"	David Peaston
55	"Sleep Talk"	Alyson Williams
56	"More Than Friends"	Jonathan Butler
57	"If I'm Not Your Lover"	Al B. Sure!
58	"Smooth Criminal"	Michael Jackson
59	"Show and Tell"	Peabo Bryson
60	"Teddy's Jam"	Guy
61	"Talk to Myself"	Christopher Williams
62	"Sticks and Stones"	Grady Harrell
63	"Girl I Got My Eyes On You"	Today
64	"My First Love"	Atlantic Starr
65	"Friends"	Jody Watley featuring Eric B. & Rakim
66	"Don't Take My Mind on a Trip"	Boy George
67	"Miss You Like Crazy"	Natalie Cole
68	"Secret Rendezvous"	Karyn White
69	"Heaven Help Me"	Deon Estus
70	"Baby Doll"	Tony! Toni! Toné!
71	"Children's Story"	Slick Rick
72	"Skin I'm In"	Cameo
73	"Gotta Get the Money"	LeVert
74	"Heat of the Moment"	After 7
75	"Take Me Where You Want To"	Gerald Alston
76	"You Are My Everything"	Surface
77	"Rock Wit'cha"	Bobby Brown
78	"Little Jackie Wants to Be a Star"	Lisa Lisa and Cult Jam
79	"Joy and Pain"	Donna Allen
80	"You and I Got a Thang"	Freddie Jackson
81	"For You to Love"	Luther Vandross
82	"Affair"	Cherrelle
83	"I'm That Type of Guy"	LL Cool J
84	"It Isn't, It Wasn't, It Ain't Never Gonna Be"	Aretha Franklin and Whitney Houston
85	"I Do"	Natalie Cole and Freddie Jackson
86	"It's My Party"	Chaka Khan
87	"Crucial"	New Edition
88	"Midnight Special"	The System
89	"Don't Stop Your Love"	Keith Sweat
90	"Bust a Move"	Young MC
91	"Lost Without You"	BeBe & CeCe Winans
92	"I Want To Be Your Lover"	Aleese Simmons
93	"For the Love of You"	Tony! Toni! Toné!
94	"Workin' Overtime"	Diana Ross
95	"Objective"	Miles Jaye
96	"Sarah, Sarah"	Jonathan Butler
97	"All My Love"	Peabo Bryson
98	"Lead Me Into Love"	Anita Baker
99	"We Got Our Own Thang"	Heavy D & the Boyz
100	"Hey Lover"	Freddie Jackson

== See also ==
- 1989 in music
- Billboard Year-End Hot 100 singles of 1989
- Billboard Year-End Hot Rap Singles of 1989
- List of Hot Black Singles number ones of 1989
