= List of Hot Black Singles number ones of 1989 =

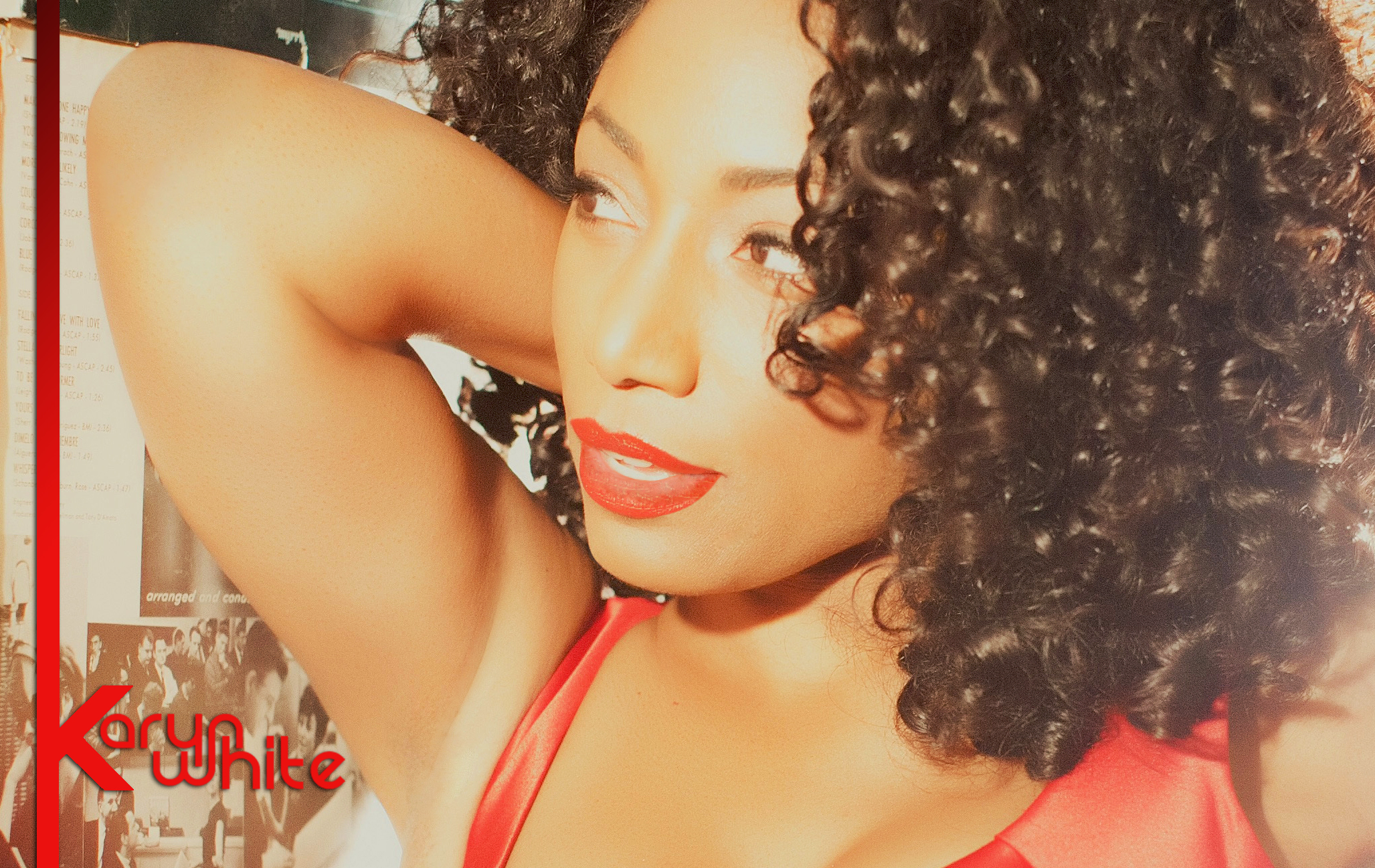
Karyn White (pictured in 2011) reached number one in 1989 with "Superwoman" and "Love Saw It".

Billboard published a weekly chart in 1989 ranking the top-performing singles in the United States in African American–oriented genres; the chart's name has changed over the decades to reflect the evolution of black music and has been published as Hot R&B/Hip-Hop Songs since 2005. In 1989, it was published under the title Hot Black Singles, and 38 different singles reached number one.

In the issue of Billboard dated January 7, Roberta Flack reached number one with "Oasis", her first appearance at the top of the chart since 1978. The following week, it was displaced by "Superwoman" by Karyn White, which spent three weeks in the top spot, the year's longest unbroken run at number one. The group Surface had the most number ones during the year, topping the chart with "Closer Than Friends", "Shower Me with Your Love" and "You Are My Everything"; despite achieving three number ones in the space of less than nine months, the trio would only have one further chart-topper (in 1991) and by 1993 their chart career would be over. Surface and White tied for the highest total number of weeks in the top spot; both acts spent five weeks atop the chart. White was one of five acts to have two number ones in 1989, along with Bobby Brown, Soul II Soul featuring Caron Wheeler, Stephanie Mills, and Babyface. In addition to his number ones as a performer, Babyface co-wrote all four of the chart-toppers by White and Brown.

The two number ones achieved by British group Soul II Soul and featured vocalist Wheeler within three months in 1989 would prove to be their only appearances in the peak position on the Hot Black Singles listing. Twelve other acts reached number one on the chart for the first time during 1989. Vanessa Williams gained her first chart-topper in February, followed by Surface in March and Today in April. In June, the hip hop trio De La Soul reached number one for the first and only time. Later in the year, Peabo Bryson, Chuckii Booker, Babyface, Teddy Riley featuring Guy, Eric Gable, Regina Belle, and Miki Howard all gained their first chart-toppers. Riley was a member of the group Guy but was given separate credit on the number-one single "My Fantasy", which was taken from the soundtrack of the film Do the Right Thing; all of the group's other chart entries were credited simply to Guy. The rapper Heavy D also made his first appearance in the top spot when he guested on the track "Just Coolin'" by LeVert. "Batdance" by Prince, taken from the soundtrack album of the film Batman, and "Miss You Much" by Janet Jackson topped both the Hot Black Singles chart and Billboard's pop chart, the Hot 100, during 1989. In contrast, "Girl I Got My Eyes On You" by Today reached number one on the black chart but failed to enter the Hot 100 at all.

== Chart history ==
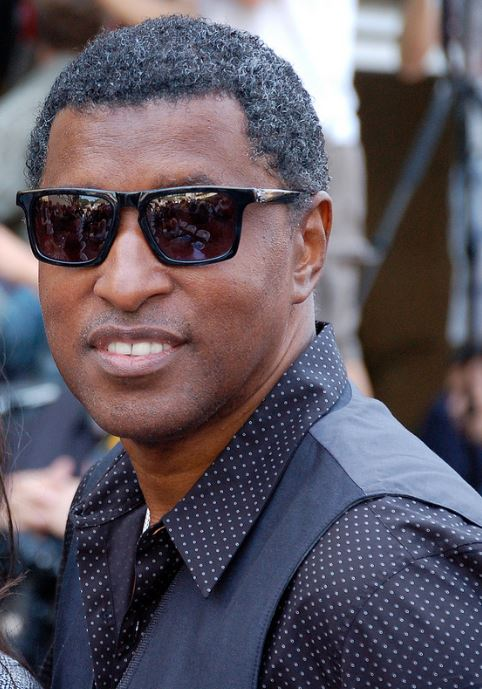
Babyface (pictured in 2013) co-wrote several of the year's number ones.

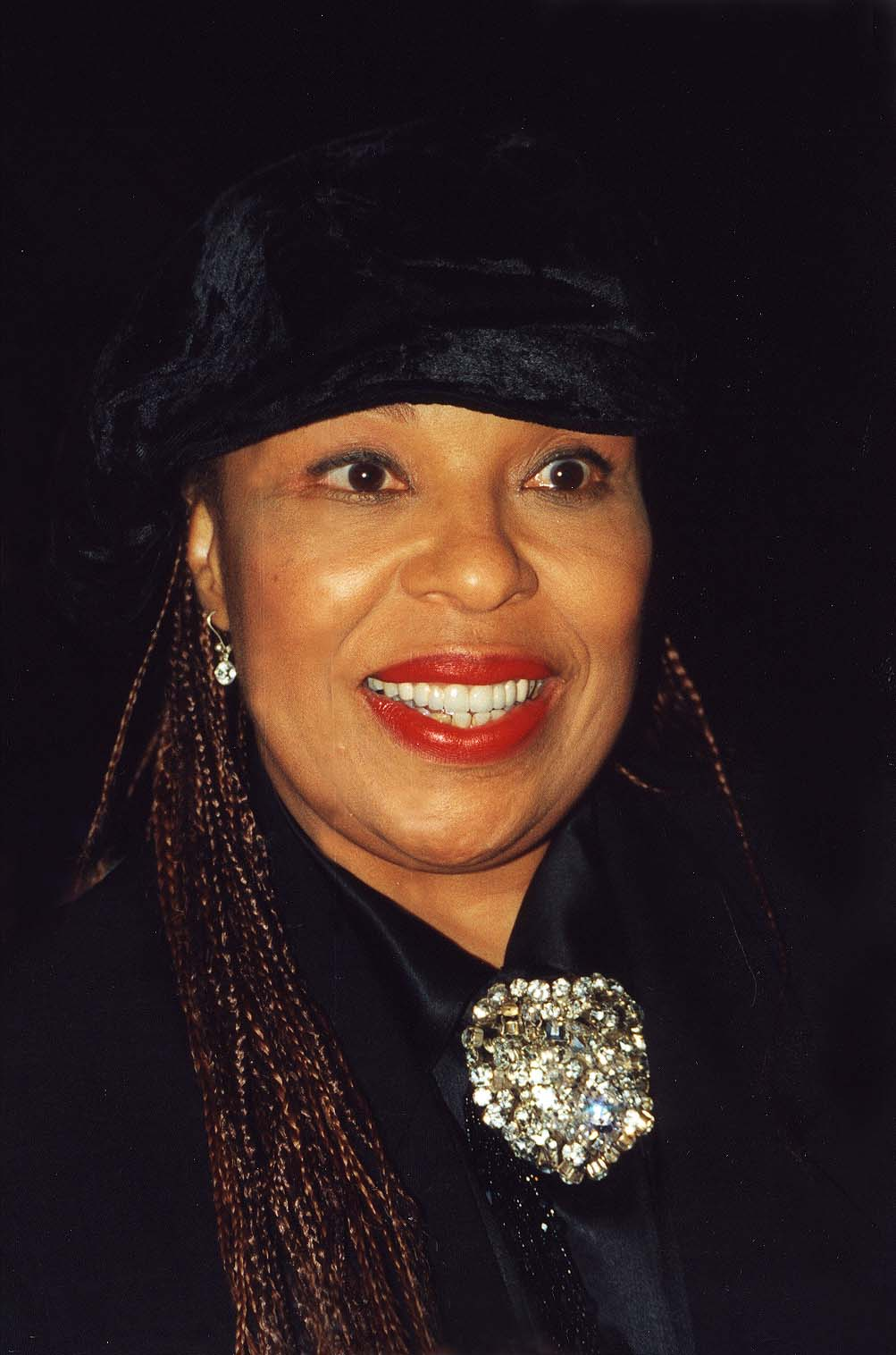
Roberta Flack (pictured in 1995) topped the chart for the first time in over ten years.

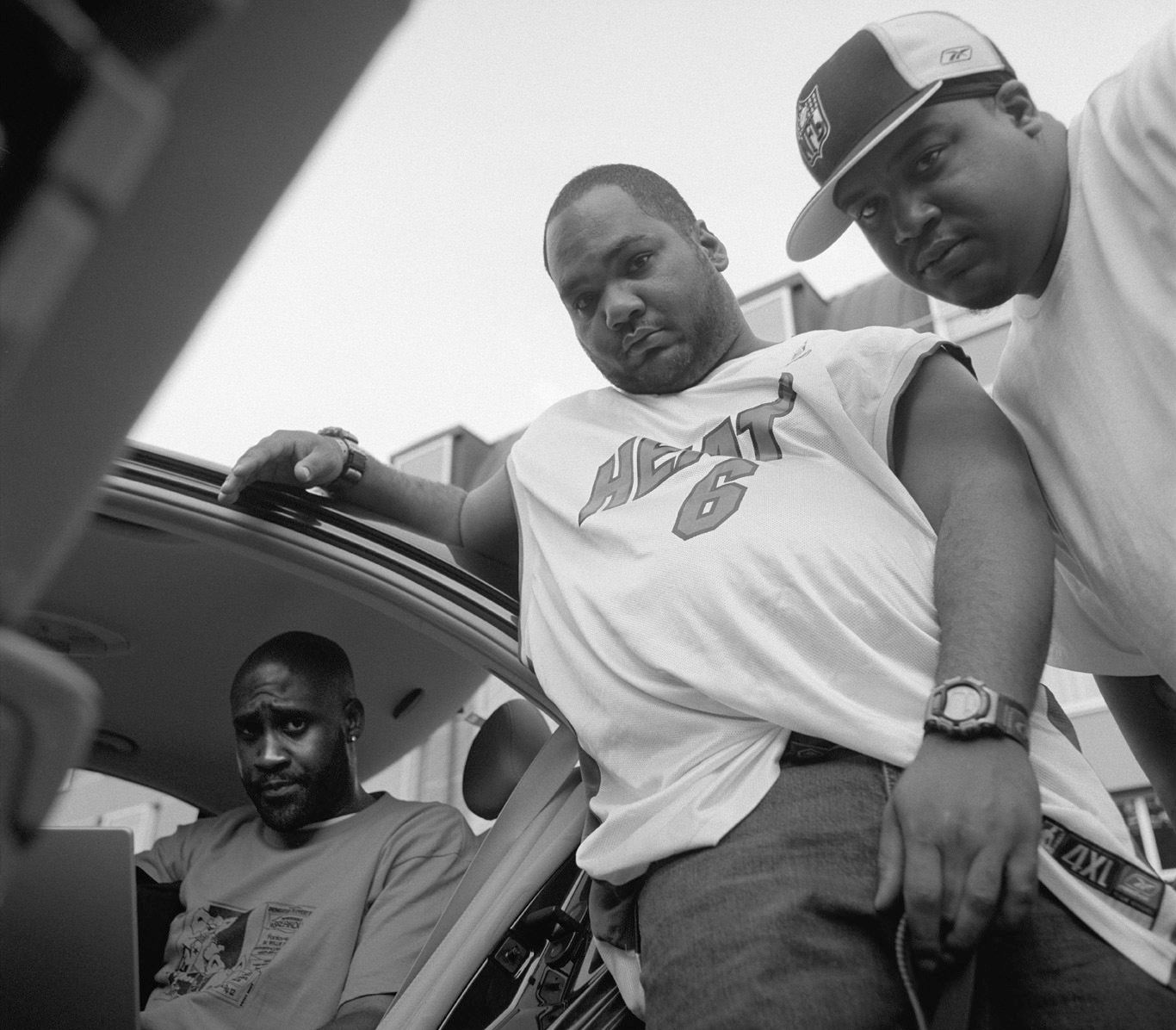
Hip hop trio De La Soul (pictured in 2002) gained their first number one with "Me Myself and I".

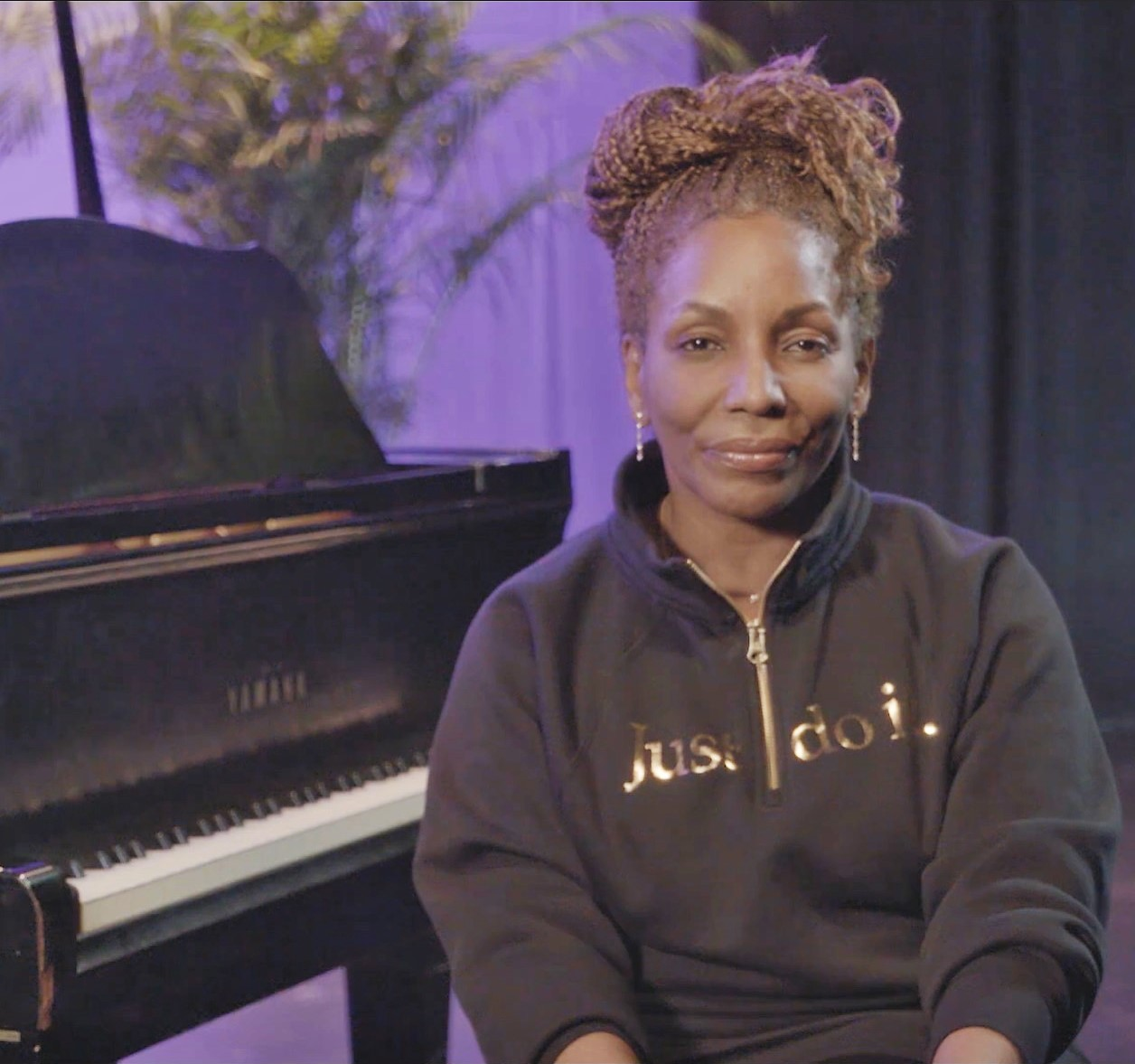
Stephanie Mills (pictured in 2020) had two number ones in 1989.

Key
†	Indicates number 1 on Billboard's year-end black singles chart

Chart history
Issue date	Title	Artist(s)	Ref.
January 7	"Oasis"	Roberta Flack	
January 14	"Superwoman" †	Karyn White	
January 21	"Superwoman" †	Karyn White	
January 28	"Superwoman" †	Karyn White	
February 4	"Can You Stand the Rain"	New Edition	
February 11	"Can You Stand the Rain"	New Edition	
February 18	"Dreamin'"	Vanessa Williams	
February 25	"Dreamin'"	Vanessa Williams	
March 4	"Just Because"	Anita Baker	
March 11	"Just Coolin'"	LeVert featuring Heavy D	
March 18	"Closer Than Friends"	Surface	
March 25	"Closer Than Friends"	Surface	
April 1	"Lucky Charm"	The Boys	
April 8	"Girl I Got My Eyes On You"	Today	
April 15	"Every Little Step"	Bobby Brown	
April 22	"Love Saw It"	Karyn White	
April 29	"Love Saw It"	Karyn White	
May 6	"Real Love"	Jody Watley	
May 13	"Start of a Romance"	Skyy	
May 20	"Start of a Romance"	Skyy	
May 27	"My First Love"	Atlantic Starr	
June 3	"Miss You Like Crazy"	Natalie Cole	
June 10	"Me Myself and I"	De La Soul	
June 17	"Have You Had Your Love Today"	The O'Jays	
June 24	"Have You Had Your Love Today"	The O'Jays	
July 1	"Show and Tell"	Peabo Bryson	
July 8	"Keep On Movin'"	Soul II Soul featuring Caron Wheeler	
July 15	"Keep On Movin'"	Soul II Soul featuring Caron Wheeler	
July 22	"Turned Away"	Chuckii Booker	
July 29	"Shower Me With Your Love"	Surface	
August 5	"On Our Own"	Bobby Brown	
August 12	"Batdance"	Prince	
August 19	"Something in the Way (You Make Me Feel)"	Stephanie Mills	
August 26	"It's No Crime"	Babyface	
September 2	"It's No Crime"	Babyface	
September 9	"My Fantasy"	Teddy Riley featuring Guy	
September 16	"Remember (The First Time)"	Eric Gable	
September 23	"Can't Get Over You"	Maze featuring Frankie Beverly	
September 30	"Can't Get Over You"	Maze featuring Frankie Beverly	
October 7	"Back to Life (However Do You Want Me)"	Soul II Soul featuring Caron Wheeler	
October 14	"Miss You Much"	Janet Jackson	
October 21	"Miss You Much"	Janet Jackson	
October 28	"Baby Come to Me"	Regina Belle	
November 4	"You Are My Everything"	Surface	
November 11	"You Are My Everything"	Surface	
November 18	"Don't Take It Personal"	Jermaine Jackson	
November 25	"Home"	Stephanie Mills	
December 2	"Here and Now"	Luther Vandross	
December 9	"Here and Now"	Luther Vandross	
December 16	"Ain't Nuthin' in the World"	Miki Howard	
December 23	"All of My Love"	The Gap Band	
December 30	"Tender Lover"^{[a]}	Babyface	

=== Notes ===
a. Due to the holiday period, Billboard did not publish an issue dated December 30, 1989. The issue dated January 6, 1990 showed the previous week's position of every song in the Hot Black Singles chart (i.e. the positions for the chart dated December 30) as identical to the chart dated December 23, which would have given "All of My Love" a second consecutive week at number one. Billboard has since published a revised chart dated December 30 on its website showing "Tender Lover" at number one.

== See also ==
- 1989 in music
- Billboard Year-End Hot Black Singles of 1989
- List of Billboard number-one R&B albums of 1989
- List of Billboard Hot 100 number ones of 1989
