= David Townsend (musician) =

American singer

- Born: May 17, 1955; Inglewood, California, United States
- Origin: New Jersey
- Died: October 26, 2005 (aged 50) Northridge, California, United States
- Genres: R&B
- Occupations: Singer, songwriter
- Instruments: Guitar, singing
- Years active: 1973–1994; 1999–2005
- Labels: Salsoul; Columbia; Boardwalk

David Edward Townsend (May 17, 1955 – October 26, 2005) was an American musician best known as the guitarist for the R&B band Surface.

== Biography ==
=== Early years ===
Townsend was born in 1955 in Inglewood, California, the son of Ed Townsend, a singer-songwriter famous for the song "For Your Love" and the co-writer and producer of "Let's Get It On" with Marvin Gaye in 1972. The younger Townsend showed an interest in music from an early age and soon learned to play an array of instruments, including the guitar, piano and synthesiser.

=== Early career ===
Grew up in Englewood, New Jersey. After graduating from college in the mid-1970s, Townsend joined The Isley Brothers' backing band Sunrize, produced by the Isley Brothers 1982, as guitarist, before forming a group called Port Authority with David Conley, another singer and musician. They found another member in Bernard Jackson and formed a songwriting partnership, which led to them becoming staff writers at EMI.

After having written songs for New Edition ("Let's Be Friends"), Gwen Guthrie and Sister Sledge ("You're So Fine"), the group decided to record some of their own material. They chose the name Surface and released "Falling in Love" and "When Your 'Ex' Wants You Back" on the disco label Salsoul Records.

=== Peak success (1989–1991) ===
Although Surface achieved some club success, Townsend felt the band could have gone a lot further on a larger label. In 1985, he went to Mississippi to visit his father, who was building a recording studio there. (Ed) Townsend pulled some strings to get Surface a contract with Columbia. They convinced the label to let them continue recording at The Lab, the 24-track studio they had built in Conley's living room in New Jersey.

Surface's first single on Columbia, "Let's Try Again", was a small hit, however, "Happy" reached No. 2 on the US R&B charts and No. 20 on the US Pop charts in 1987, and the group's debut album sold well. Their 1989 follow-up album, 2nd Wave saw the band become staples of the quiet storm urban radio format with the success of the single "Closer Than Friends", which reached No. 1 on the R&B charts on March 18, 1989 and was there for two weeks, and "Shower Me With Your Love," a Jackson written song, reached No. 1 on the R&B Charts on July 29, which crossed over to the US Pop charts. Their next single, "You Are My Everything", featured Regina Belle as a guest vocalist and on November 4, 1989, took over the top of the R&B charts, replacing her single "Baby Come to Me," it also crossed over onto the British charts.

Townsend had a song that he co-wrote with David Conley reach No. 1 on the US R&B charts. "Don't Take It Personal" by Jermaine Jackson, reached No. 1 on November 18, 1989, replacing "You Are My Everything" by Surface.

In 1991, Surface released the album 3 Deep which included the singles "All I Want Is You", "Never Gonna Let You Down" and "The First Time", which topped the US pop charts. "The First Time" reached No. 1 on the US R&B charts on January 19, 1991 and became the group's biggest hit.

However, Townsend and Conley decided to concentrate on songwriting and producing and helped Aretha Franklin record the album What You See Is What You Sweat in 1991, while Jackson went solo.

=== Later years ===
The group disbanded in 1994 after Townsend and Jackson left the group. However, in 1999, the band reunited and released their final studio album Love Zone. Plans were being made for a reunion tour. However, those plans were cancelled when Townsend was found dead at his home on October 26, 2005, in Northridge, California.

== Studio albums ==
- Townsend, Townsend, Townsend & Rogers (with Townsend, Townsend, Townsend & Rogers) (Chocolate City), 1979
- Sunrize (with Sunrize) (Boardwalk), 1982

Surface

- Surface, 1986
- 2nd Wave, 1988
- 3 Deep, 1990
- Love Zone, 1998

== See also ==
- R&B number-one hits of 1989 (USA)
- R&B number-one hits of 1991 (USA)
