= Thug Mentality 1999 =

Studio album by Krayzie Bone
- Released: April 6, 1999
- Recorded: 1997–1998
- Studio: Audio Vision (Miami); Studio 56 (California); Back Room; Hit Factory (New York City); Quad (New York City); Urban; Chung King Studios (New York City); Buchanan; Westlake (West Hollywood); Cotton Row (Memphis); Ocean Way (Los Angeles)
- Genre: Hip hop; gangsta rap; R&B; horrorcore
- Length: 1:34:12
- Label: Ruthless; Relativity; Mo Thugs
- Producer: Stephen Marley; Romeo Antonio; Michael Seifert; Damizza; T-Mix; Leiahola Jones; Nightfiend; Tombstone; Anthony President; Brainz; Alex Marlow; Erik "E" Nordquist; DJ U-Neek; Gusto "40" Moss; Tony "C"; Steve Pageot; Dewey "Duke" Sanders; KayGee; Falonte Moore; Rated R; DJ Nasty

Krayzie Bone chronology
Thug Mentality 1999 (1999)	Thug on da Line (2001)

Singles from Thug Mentality 1999
- 1. "Thug Mentality" Released: March 20, 1999; 2. "Paper" Released: October 1999

Thug Mentality 1999 is the debut solo studio album by American rapper Krayzie Bone. It was released April 6, 1999, on Ruthless Records, Relativity Records and Mo Thugs Records.

The double-disc album featured a large selection of guest appearances, including Bone Thugs-n-Harmony, Mariah Carey, the Marley Brothers, Big Pun, Fat Joe, Cuban Link, Gangsta Boo, E-40, 8Ball & MJG, Kurupt, Treach and Snoop Dogg.

== Background ==
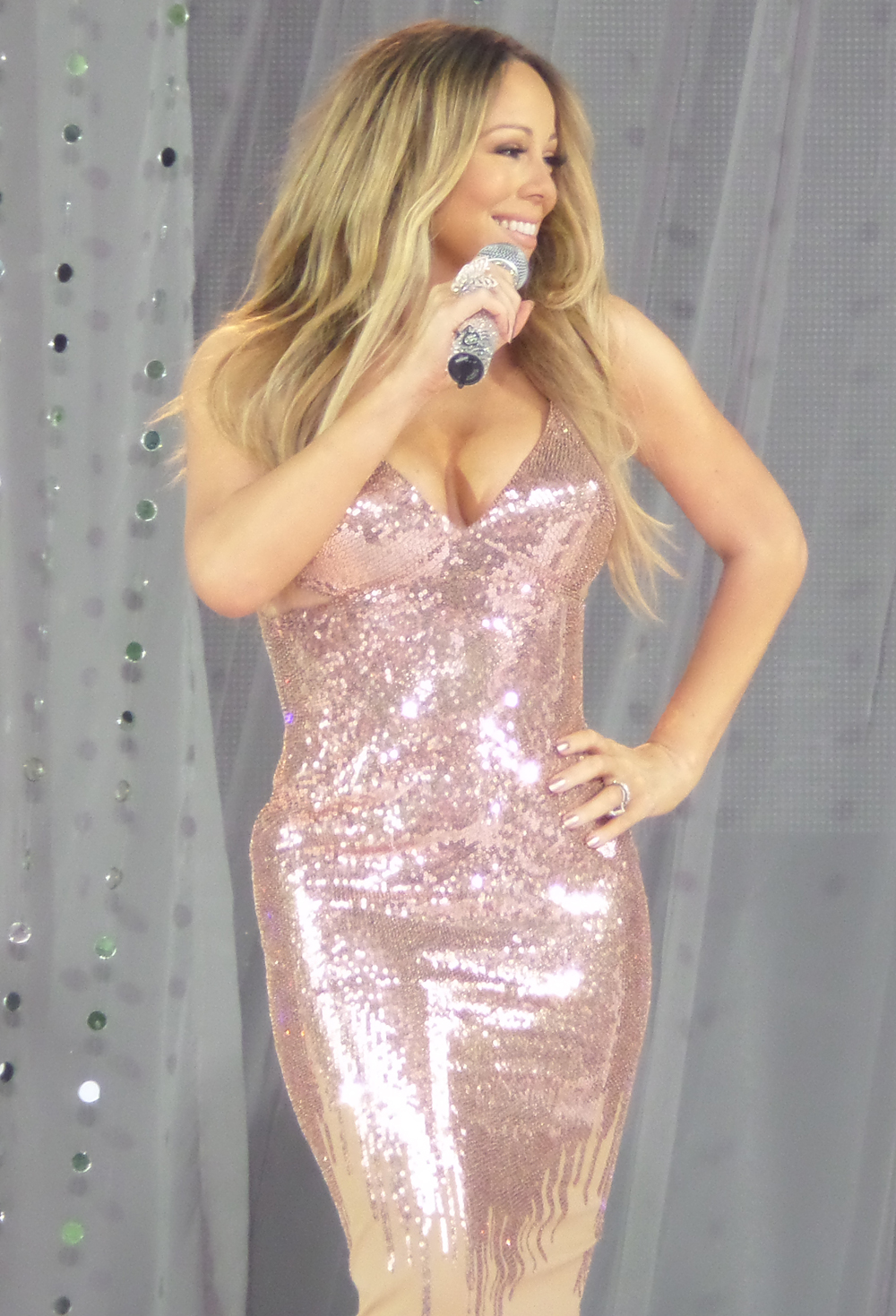
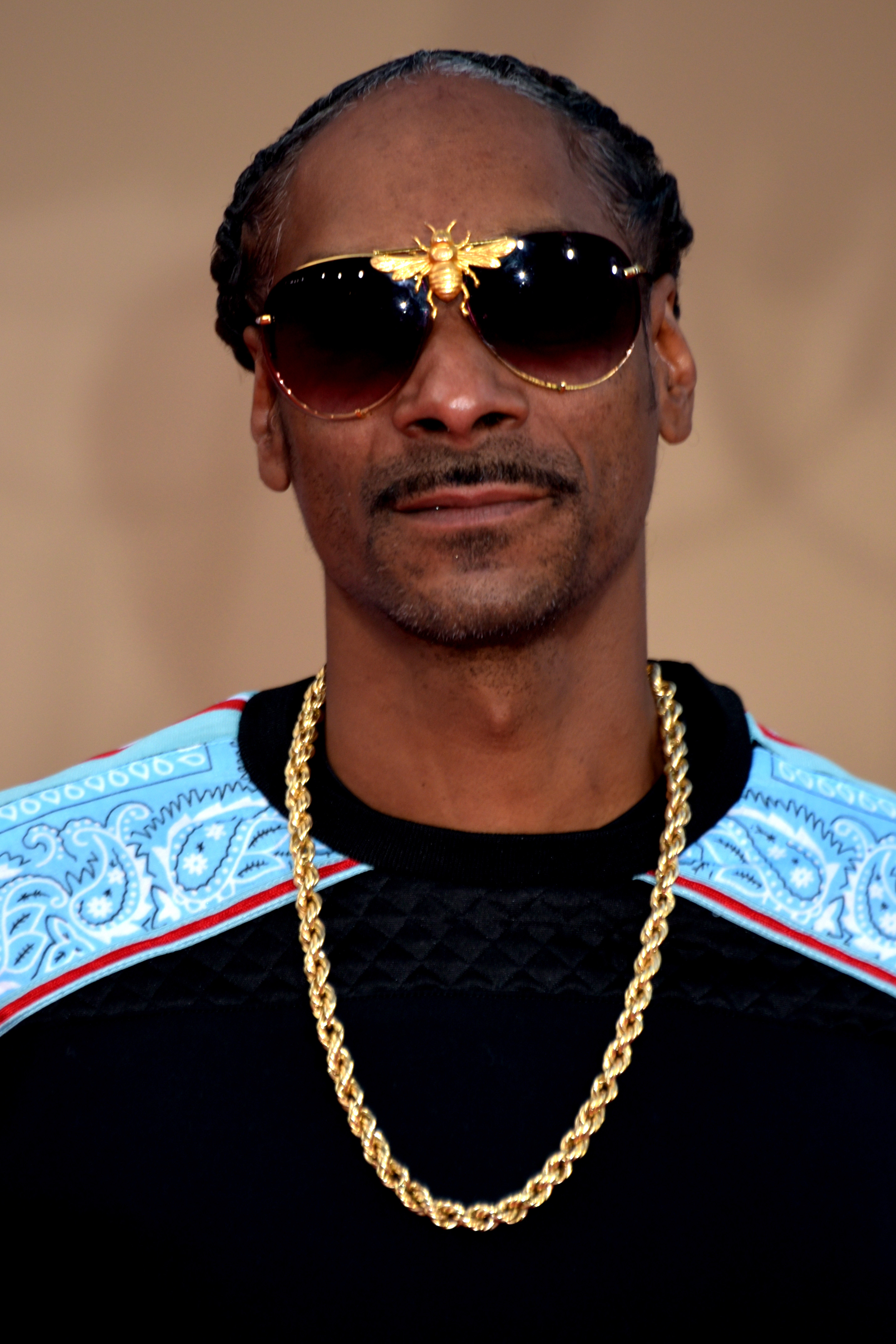
The album featured a large selection of guest appearances, including singer Mariah Carey and rappers Snoop Dogg, Big Pun and more.

In an interview with HipHopDX, Krayzie Bone spoke on the creation of the album:

I’d have to say that was the easiest album to make because I had so much material and so much stuff backed up. We was fresh, still not that far from being on the streets. I still had a lot of material that I had that I wanted to get off my chest. It was a breeze. A lot of those tracks, I had the ideas [first] and then I went in and laid them straight out. Some of the stuff was from what we didn’t use from Art Of War. On Art Of War, I would basically start the songs off and everyone else would just come in and do what they do. What dudes didn’t use, I just kept stashed away and when it was time work on my album, I just brought them out.

Krayzie Bone wrote and recorded over 150 songs for the album, of which thirty-eight made the album's final cut as a double album.

== Singles ==
The album's lead single, titled "Thug Mentality" was released on March 20, 1999. The song was produced by Michael Seifert. It peaked at number 16 on the Hot R&B/Hip-Hop Songs, and at number 31 on the R&B/Hip-Hop Airplay.

The album's second single, titled "Paper" was released in October 1999. The song was produced by Krayzie Bone himself. The song's accompanying music video was later released that year.

== Critical reception ==
Professional ratings
Review scores
Source	Rating
AllMusic	3/5 stars
Entertainment Weekly	B+
Los Angeles Times	3/4 stars
RapReviews	5/10
Rolling Stone	3.5/5 stars
The Source	3.5/5 stars
USA Today	3/4 stars

Thug Mentality 1999 was met with generally mixed to positive reviews from music critics. Stephen Thomas Erlewine from AllMusic wrote: "Krayzie doesn't hesitate to accentuate the already smooth surfaces of his music. Some of these cuts are positively smoove, which stands in direct contrast to the gangstafied lyrics, but that's always been a part of the Bone trademark". The journalist criticized the excessive length of the album, calling it "ridiculously inflated" and adding that "there are enough songs to make a very good record, possibly one of the best things Krayzie has been involved with". Entertainment Weekly's Matt Diehl called it "the best solo release so far from one of the Ohio speed rappers". Pete T. of RapReviews wrote: "Krayzie displays a wide range of flows and deliveries, often on single tracks." He highlighted fast rapping on the track "Heated Heavy", saying that "Krayzie could give Twista a run for his money any day." Soren Baker, in his review for Los Angeles Times, wrote that "the husky-voiced rapper keeps pushing the music's aural boundaries", commending both the production that features "an eclectic range of instruments" and Krayzie Bone's vocal delivery. He also criticized the album's length. Kris Ex of Rolling Stone described Thug Mentality 1999 as "self-indulgent – but consistently engaging", while also taking issue with some of its lyrical content, such as a "vivid date rape" in the track "Look At You Now", which he named "one of the most disturbing moments ever put to wax". Charlie R. Braxton of The Source believed that with this album Krayzie Bone takes a "gigantic step toward establishing himself as a soloist of the highest caliber", praising his vocal performance, ranging from "hard-core and rapid-fire to the softer, more sing-songy". This was also highlighted by USA Today's Steve Jones, who believed that the artist "shows himself adept at a variety of delivery styles". He described the production of the album as "smooth grooves and pounding rhythms".

== Commercial performance ==
Thug Mentality 1999 debuted at number four on the Billboard 200 with 140,000 album-equivalent units in its first week. The album was certified Platinum by the Recording Industry Association of America (RIAA) in May 10, 1999. The album has sold 1,000,000 copies in the United States.

== Track listing ==
=== Disc one ===
No.	Title	Writer(s)	Producer(s)	Length
1.	"Intro (Thug Invasion)"	Anthony Henderson		2:00
2.	"Heated Heavy"	Henderson	Krayzie Bone	3:07
3.	"Paper"	Henderson; David Edward Townsend; Bernard Jackson	Krayzie Bone	4:32
4.	"The Messenger (Skit)"	Henderson		2:20
5.	"Payback Iz A Bitch" (featuring Bam)	Henderson; E. Townsend; T. Gray	Erik "E" Nordquist	3:39
6.	"Thugline" (featuring Relay)	Henderson; L. Wright; D. Lackey; A. Lackey; V. Bahar; R. Coes	Nightfiend	4:09
7.	"Dummy Man (Skit)"	Henderson; Leslie Bricusse; Anthony Newley		0:29
8.	"Dummy Man"	Henderson; Romeo Antonio	Romeo Antonio	3:12
9.	"Thugz All Ova Da World" (featuring Treach)	Henderson; R. Coes; Anthony Criss	Nightfiend	3:36
10.	"Street People" (featuring Niko)	Henderson; N. Williams; E. Nordquist	Erik "E" Nordquist	4:31
11.	"Pimpz, Thugz, Hustlaz & Gangstaz" (featuring 8Ball & MJG & Layzie Bone)	Henderson; Steven Howse; T. Jones; Premmro Smith; Marlon Goodwin	T-Mix; Romeo Antonio	5:14
12.	"Da Bullshit (Skit)"	Henderson		0:37
13.	"Drama"	Henderson; T. Cowan	Tony "C"	3:26
14.	"World War (Twista & Speedknot Mobstaz Diss)"	Henderson; E. Nordquist	Erik "E" Nordquist	3:03
15.	"The War Iz On" (featuring Snoop Dogg, Kurupt & Layzie Bone)	Henderson; S. Howse; Ricardo Brown; Calvin Broadus	Steve Pageot; Dewey "Duke" Sanders	4:31
16.	"When I Die" (featuring Fat Joe, Big Pun & Cuban Link)	Henderson; Joseph Cartagena; C. Rios; F. Delgado; F. Moore; K. Gist	KayGee; Falonte Moore	4:03
17.	"Thug Alwayz (Crucial Conflict & Do or Die Diss)" (featuring Bone Thugs-n-Harmony)	Henderson; Steven Howse; Stanley Howse; J. Bradford; G. Jones; Charles Scruggs	Rater; DJ Nasty	4:22
18.	"Thug Mentality"	Henderson; M. Seifert	Michael Seifert	4:22

=== Disc two ===
No.	Title	Writer(s)	Producer(s)	Length
1.	"Murda Won't Stop (Skit)"	Henderson		2:15
2.	"Where My Thugz At"	Henderson; Tim Middleton	DJ U-Neek	4:18
3.	"Smokin' Budda"	Henderson; G. Moss; D. Hall; J. Oates	Gusto "40" Moss	3:41
4.	"Knieght Rieduz (Here We Come)" (featuring Knieght Rieduz)	Henderson; R. Coes	Nightfiend	2:49
5.	"Try Me"	Henderson; A. Marlow	Alex Marlow	4:47
6.	"Theze Dayz" (featuring K-Mont, Asu & Bam)	Henderson; T. Gray; E. Britt; J. Hargrove; E. Nordquist	Erik "E" Nordquist	3:18
7.	"Silent Warrior"	Henderson; R. Antonio	Romeo Antonio	4:31
8.	"Shoot The Club Up"	Henderson	Anthony President; Brainz	2:58
9.	"Silence" (featuring The Graveyard Shift)	Henderson	Tombstone; Romeo Antonio	2:32
10.	"Look At You Now (Skit)"	Henderson		4:57
11.	"Won't Ez Up Tonight"	Henderson; R. Coes	Nightfiend	2:11
12.	"Sad Song (Skit)"	Henderson		3:30
13.	"I Still Believe/Pure Imagination" (featuring Mariah Carey)	Henderson; Mariah Carey; Damion Young; A. Armato; B. Cantarelli; L. Briccuse; A. Newley	Damizza	4:07
14.	"We Starvin'" (featuring E-40 & Gangsta Boo)	Henderson; Earl Stevens; Lola Mitchell; T. Jones; P. Botkin Jr.; B. DeVorzon	T-Mix	4:07
15.	"Smoke & Burn" (featuring Up In Clouds)	Henderson; L. Jones	Krayzie Bone; Leiahlola Jones	4:09
16.	"Power" (featuring Thug Queen)	Henderson; K. Greer	Krayzie Bone; Erick "E" Nordquist^{[a]}	3:54
17.	"That's The Way"	Henderson; Michael Seifert	Michael Seifert	3:25
18.	"Armageddon" (featuring Souljah Boy, Mo! Hart, Thug Queen & Felecia)	Henderson; R. Antonio; W. Lyons	Romeo Antonio	4:16
19.	"Murda Mo'"	Henderson; A. Dudley; T. Horn; J. Jeczalik; G. Logan; P. Morley	Krayzie Bone	5:35
20.	"Revolution" (featuring The Marley Brothers)	Henderson; Stephen Marley; Damian Marley; Julian Marley	Stephen Marley; Damian Marley^{[a]}; Julian Marley^{[a]}; Roland Lyfook^{[a]}	4:17

Notes

- ^{^[a]} signifies an co-producer

Sample credits

- "Paper" contains elements of "Closer Than Friends" & "You Are My Everything", written by David Townsend and Bernard Jackson, and performed by Surface.
- "Dummy Man (Skit)" contains replayed elements from "The Candy Man", written by Leslie Bricusse and Anthony Newley, and performed by Sammy Davis Jr.
- "Thug Alwayz" contains elements from "Share My Love", written by J. Bradford and G. Jones, and performed by Rare Earth.
- "Smokin' Budda" contains elements from "Sara Smile", written by Daryl Hall and John Oates.
- "We Starvin'" contains replayed elements from "Theme From The Young & Restless", written by P. Botkin Jr. and B. DeVorson.
- "Murda Mo" contains elements of "Moments in Love", written and performed by Art of Noise.

== Charts ==
=== Weekly charts ===
Chart (1999)	Peak position
Australian Albums (ARIA)	82
New Zealand Albums (RMNZ)	23
US Billboard 200	4
US Top R&B/Hip-Hop Albums (Billboard)	2

=== Year-end charts ===
Chart (1999)	Position
US Billboard 200	184
US Top R&B/Hip-Hop Albums (Billboard)	70

== Certifications ==
Region	Certification	Certified units/sales
United States (RIAA)	Platinum	1,000,000^{^}
^{^} Shipments figures based on certification alone.

== Release history ==
Region	Date	Format(s)	Label	Ref.
United States	April 6, 1999	cassette	Relativity Records	
United States	April 6, 1999	CD	Ruthless; Relativity; Mo Thugs	
