= 1990 Soul Train Music Awards =

Music awards ceremony in Los Angeles, US

Soul Train Music Awards
- Date: March 14, 1990
- Location: Shrine Auditorium, Los Angeles, California
- Country: United States
- Hosted by: Dionne Warwick, Patti LaBelle and Luther Vandross
- First award: 1987

Highlights
- Most awards: Janet Jackson and Soul II Soul (3)
- Website: soultrain.com

Television/radio coverage
- Network: WGN America
- Produced by: Don Cornelius Productions

The 1990 Soul Train Music Awards was held at the Shrine Auditorium in Los Angeles, California and aired live in select cities on March 14, 1990 (and was later syndicated in other areas), honoring the best in R&B, soul, rap, jazz, and gospel music from the previous year. The show was hosted by Patti LaBelle, Luther Vandross and Dionne Warwick.

== Special awards ==
=== Heritage Award for Career Achievement ===
- Quincy Jones

=== Sammy Davis Jr. Award for Entertainer of the Year ===
- Arsenio Hall

== Winners and nominees ==
Winners are in bold text.

=== Best R&B/Urban Contemporary Album – Male ===
- **Babyface – Tender Lover**
  - Bobby Brown – Dance!...Ya Know It!
  - Quincy Jones – Back on the Block
  - Luther Vandross – The Best of Luther Vandross... The Best of Love

=== Best R&B/Urban Contemporary Album – Female ===
- **Janet Jackson – Rhythm Nation 1814**
  - Regina Belle – Stay with Me
  - Stacy Lattisaw – What You Need
  - Stephanie Mills – Home

=== Best R&B/Urban Contemporary Album – Group, Band, or Duo ===
- **Soul II Soul – Club Classics Vol. One**
  - Heavy D and the Boyz – Big Tyme
  - Maze and Frankie Beverly – Silky Soul
  - Milli Vanilli – Girl You Know It's True

=== Best R&B/Urban Contemporary Single – Male ===
- **Luther Vandross – "Here and Now"**
  - Babyface – "It's No Crime"
  - Bobby Brown – "Every Little Step"
  - Eric Gable – "Remember (The First Time)"

=== Best R&B/Urban Contemporary Single – Female ===
- **Karyn White – "Secret Rendezvous"**
  - Regina Belle – "Baby Come to Me"
  - Janet Jackson "Miss You Much"
  - Vesta – "Congratulations"

=== Best R&B/Urban Contemporary Single – Group, Band, or Duo ===
- **Soul II Soul – "Keep On Movin'"**
  - Guy – "I Like"
  - Surface – "Shower Me with Your Love"
  - Sweet Obsession - "Cash"

=== Best R&B/Urban Contemporary Song of the Year ===
- **Soul II Soul – "Keep On Movin'"**
  - Paula Abdul – "Straight Up"
  - Bobby Brown – "Every Little Step"
  - Luther Vandross – "Here and Now"

=== Best Music Video ===
- **Janet Jackson – "Rhythm Nation"**
  - Eric Gable – "Remember (The First Time)"
  - Quincy Jones – "I'll Be Good to You"
  - Prince – "Batdance"

=== Best R&B/Urban Contemporary New Artist ===
- **David Peaston**
  - Eric Gable
  - Soul II Soul
  - Young MC

=== Best Rap Album ===
- **Heavy D and the Boyz – Big Tyme**
  - Big Daddy Kane – It's a Big Daddy Thing
  - De La Soul – 3 Feet High and Rising
  - Young MC – Stone Cold Rhymin'

=== Best Jazz Album ===
- **Quincy Jones – Back on the Block**
  - Alex Bugnon – Love Seasons
  - Kenny G – Kenny G Live
  - Joe Sample – Spellbound

=== Best Gospel Album ===
- **BeBe & CeCe Winans – Heaven**
  - Al Green – I Get Joy
  - Mississippi Mass Choir – Mississippi Mass Choir Live
  - The Winans – Live at Carnegie Hall

== Performances ==
- Regina Belle – "Baby Come to Me"
- Big Daddy Kane – "I Get the Job Done"
- Bobby Brown – "On Our Own"
- Milli Vanilli – "Blame It on the Rain"
- Quincy Jones Tribute:
  - Dionne Warwick – How Do You Keep the Music Playing?
  - Luther Vandross – "The First Time Ever I Saw Your Face"
  - Patti LaBelle – "Just Once"
  - Tevin Campbell – "Tomorrow (A Better You, Better Me)"
- Al B. Sure!, James Ingram, El Debarge and Barry White – "The Secret Garden"
- Soul II Soul – "Back to Life" / "Jazzie's Groove"
- Jody Watley – "Everything"
- The Winans and Teddy Riley – "It's Time"

== Presenters ==
- Carole Gist and Kid 'n Play - Presented Best Music Video
- Tyler Collins and Full Force - Presented Best R&B Urban Contemporary New Artist
- BeBe & CeCe Winans and Calloway - Presented Best R&B Urban Contemporary Single Group, Band, or Duo
- Eric Gable, Stacy Lattisaw, and David Peaston - Presented Best Jazz Album
- Marla Gibbs and Surface - Presented Best Gospel Album
- L.A. Reid, Babyface, and Troy Beyer - Presented Best Rap Album
- Lisa Stansfield and Heavy D & The Boyz - Presented Best R&B Urban Contemporary Single Male
- Young MC and Troop - Presented Best R&B Urban Contemporary Single Female
- New Edition and Guy - Presented Urban Contemporary Song of the Year
- Stevie Wonder - Presented Outstanding Award For Career Achievement
- Barry White and Kenny G Presented Best R&B Urban Contemporary Album Group, Band, or Duo
- Rick Dees and The Pointer Sisters - Presented Best R&B Urban Contemporary Album Male
- Edwin Hawkins, Michael Bolton, and Tone Loc - Presented Best R&B Urban Contemporary Album Female
