= 2nd Wave (album) =

Studio album by Surface
- Released: October 11, 1988
- Recorded: February – July 1988
- Studio: The Lab (West Orange, New Jersey)
- Genre: R&B, soul, funk
- Length: 37:25
- Label: Columbia
- Producer: Surface

Surface chronology
Surface (1986)	2nd Wave (1988)	3 Deep (1990)

Singles from 2nd Wave
- 1. "I Missed" Released: 1988; 2. "Closer Than Friends" Released: 1989; 3. "Shower Me with Your Love" Released: 1989; 4. "You Are My Everything" Released: 1989; 5. "Can We Spend Some Time" Released: 1989

Professional ratings
Review scores
Source	Rating
AllMusic	link

2nd Wave is the second studio album by Surface, released in October 1988 on Columbia Records.

== The Album ==
A total of five singles were released from the album. "I Missed" did not chart on the Billboard Hot 100 but reached number 3 on the US R&B chart. "Closer Than Friends" peaked at number 57 on the pop charts and became the first of four R&B number-one hits for the group, followed by "Shower Me with Your Love," "You Are My Everything," and "The First Time."

Among all the songs on the album, "Shower Me with Your Love" achieved the most success, reaching number 5 on the pop charts.

The single "Can We Spend Some Time" peaked at number 5 on the R&B chart but did not enter the pop chart. Based on the chart performance of its singles, the album peaked at number 56 on the Billboard 200. However, it was later certified platinum in 1994.

== Reception ==
- AllMusic's Ron Wynn gave the album a rating of four out of five stars. He described it as "a good follow-up for the New Jersey trio" and highlighted the songs "Shower Me with Your Love" and "You Are My Everything" as standout tracks.

== Track listing ==
1. "Shower Me with Your Love" (Bernard Jackson) - 4:53
2. "Closer Than Friends" (Jackson, David Townsend) - 4:44
3. "Can We Spend Some Time" (Jackson) - 4:30
4. "You Are My Everything" (Townsend, David Conley, Everett Collins, Derrick Culler) - 4:28
5. "I Missed" (Jackson, Conley, Collins) - 4:56
6. "Black Shades" (Culler, Gene Lennon, Joshua Thompson) - 4:57
7. "Hold On to Love" (Jackson, Townsend, Conley) - 4:10
8. "Where's That Girl" (Jackson, Townsend, Conley) - 4:31

== Personnel ==
Surface

- Bernard Jackson – arrangements (1–5, 7, 8), lead vocals, backing vocals (1, 2, 3, 5–8), guitars (3), electric bass (3), rapping (6)
- David Townsend – arrangements (1–5, 7, 8), guitars (1, 3, 4, 5, 7, 8), electric piano (2, 3), synthesizers (2, 7, 8), drum programming (2, 7), backing vocals (4, 6)
- David "Pic" Conley – arrangements (1–5, 7, 8), saxophone (1), synth bass (2, 4, 7, 8), drum programming (2–5, 7, 8), percussion (4), flute (4, 7), backing vocals (4, 6), orchestral hits (5)

Additional musicians

- Brian Simpson – keyboards (1), synth bass (1), drum programming (1)
- Bobby Wooten – string synthesizer (1), string arrangements (1, 8), conductor (8)
- Vassal Benford – acoustic piano (2, 3), synthesizers (2–5, 7), horns (5), lead guitar (7)
- Everett Collins – synthesizers (4), backing vocals (4), synth bass (5), drum programming (5), drum arrangements (5), percussion (7)
- Joshua Thompson – keyboards (6), guitars (6), synth bass (6), drum programming (6)
- Gene Lennon – computer programming (6), drum programming (6), air filter voice (6)
- "Bassy" Bob Brockmann – cymbals (1)
- Larry Conley – saxophone (6)
- Derrick Culler – arrangements (6), backing vocals (6)
- Len-Thom – arrangements (6)
- Regina Belle – guest vocals (4, 7)
- Kathy "Cat-Nap" Griffin – backing vocals (6)
- Laurie Hawes – backing vocals (6)
- Cheryl Maynard – backing vocals (6)
- Lisa Stevens – backing vocals (6)
- Starleana Young – backing vocals (6)

Strings (tracks 1 & 8)

- Gene Orloff
- Julian Barbara
- Alfred Brown
- Arnold Eidus
- Max Ellen
- Harry Lookofsky
- Mark Shuman
- Marti Sweet
- Fred Zlotkin

== Production ==
- Surface – producers
- John Falzarano – engineer (1)
- David Conley – engineer (2–8)
- Paul Higgins – assistant engineer
- Joseph Intife – assistant engineer
- Bob Brockmann – mixing (1–3, 6, 7)
- Carl Beatty – mixing (4, 5, 8)
- Frank Nogverias – mix assistant
- Jose Rodriguez – mastering
- Josephine DiDonato – art direction, design
- Britain Hill – photography

Studios

- Overdubbed at House of Music (West Orange, New Jersey).
- Mixed at Marathon Studios (New York City, New York).
- Mastered at Sterling Sound (New York City, New York).

== Charts ==
=== Weekly charts ===
Chart (1989)	Peak position
US Billboard 200	56
US Top R&B/Hip-Hop Albums (Billboard)	5

=== Year-end charts ===
Chart (1989)	Position
US Top R&B/Hip-Hop Albums (Billboard)	6

== Certifications ==
Region	Certification	Certified units/sales
United States (RIAA)	Platinum	1,000,000^{^}
^{^} Shipments figures based on certification alone.
