= Never Gonna Let You Down =

Never Gonna Let You Down may refer to:

- "Never Gonna Let You Down" (Surface song), 1990
- "Never Gonna Let You Down" (Colbie Caillat song), 2014

== See also ==
- Never Let You Down (disambiguation)
