= The Best of Surface...A Nice Time for Loving =

1991 compilation album by Surface

...A Nice Time 4 Lovin'

Studio album by Surface
- Released: 1991
- Genre: R&B, soul
- Length: 46:37
- Label: Columbia Records
- Producer: Surface

Professional ratings
Review scores
Source	Rating
AllMusic	4/5 stars

The Best of Surface...A Nice Time for Loving is a greatest hits compilation album by the American R&B music trio Surface, released in 1991. The compilation included tracks from the trio's three studio albums released between 1986 and 1990. "...A Nice Time for Loving", a new song included with the compilation, reached No. 52 in the Billboard R&B charts in early 1992.

== Track listing ==
#	Title	Writer(s)	Length
1.	"...A Nice Time for Lovin'"	David Conley/David Townsend	6:16
2.	"Happy"	David Conley/Bernard Jackson/David Townsend	3:56
3.	"Closer Than Friends"	Bernard Jackson/David Townsend	5:07
4.	"You Are My Everything"	Everett Collins/David Conley/Derrick Culler/David Townsend	3:58
5.	"I Missed"	Everett Collins/David Conley/Bernard Jackson	5:36
6.	"Shower Me with Your Love"	Bernard Jackson	4:56
7.	"The First Time"	Bernard Jackson/Bernard Simpson	4:17
8.	"Never Gonna Let You Down"	Bernard Jackson	3:49
9.	"A World of Our Own"	Bernard Jackson/Barry Mann/Cynthia Weil	4:46
10.	"Christmas Time Is Here"	Bernard Jackson	4:16

== Personnel ==
=== Surface ===
- Bernard Jackson: Lead and backing vocals, electric and acoustic guitars, bass, rapping
- David Townsend: Electric and acoustic guitars, synthesizers, electric piano, drum programming, backing vocals
- David "Pic" Conley: Saxophone, bass synthesizer, drum programming, percussion, flute, orchestral hits, backing vocals
