= 3 Deep (album) =

Studio album by Surface
- Released: November 6, 1990
- Recorded: 1989
- Studio: Studio On Wheels (Glendale, California); The Lab (West Orange, New Jersey); Chameleon Sound Studio (East Orange, New Jersey); Sound Tracks Recording Studios (New York City)
- Genre: R&B, soul
- Length: 47:15
- Label: Columbia; Sony
- Producer: Surface

Surface chronology
2nd Wave (1988)	3 Deep (1990)	Love Zone (1999)

Singles from 3 Deep
- 1. "The First Time" Released: September 7, 1990; 2. "All I Want Is You" Released: 1991; 3. "Never Gonna Let You Down" Released: 1991; 4. "You're the One/We Don't Have to Say Good-bye" Released: 1991

Professional ratings
Review scores
Source	Rating
Allmusic	3.5/5 stars

3 Deep is the third studio album by Surface, released in 1990 on Columbia Records. The first single from the album, "The First Time" claimed the top spot on the U.S. pop charts for two straight weeks. The second single, "All I Want Is You", teams Bernard Jackson with singer Regina Belle on vocals and peaked at number eight on the Hot R&B Singles chart. The third single, "Never Gonna Let You Down", peaked at number 17 on both the Billboard Hot 100 and Adult Contemporary charts.

== Track listing ==
No.	Title	Writer(s)	Length
1.	"The First Time"	Bernard Jackson, Brian Simpson	4:15
2.	"Give Her Your Love/Rainbow (Reprise) (Interlude)"	David Conley, Bernard Jackson, David Townsend	6:26
3.	"All I Want Is You"	David Conley, Everett Collins, Derrick Culler	5:54
4.	"Tomorrow"	David Conley, Derrick Culler	5:03
5.	"You're the One/We Don't Have to Say Good-Bye (Interlude)"	David Conley, Bernard Jackson, David Townsend, Derrick Culler	5:51
6.	"Never Gonna Let You Down"	Bernard Jackson	4:00
7.	"10"	Bernard Jackson	4:06
8.	"Don't Wanna Turn You off/Kid Stuff (Young Love) (Interlude)"	David Conley, Gene Lennon, Joshua Thompson, David Townsend	5:59
9.	"When It Comes to Love/Echoes (Interlude)"	David Conley, Bernard Jackson, David Townsend	5:41
10.	"Ain't Givin' Up"	David Conley/Everett Collins/David Townsend	4:25
11.	"Love X Trust"	David Conley, Bernard Jackson, David Townsend	4:41
12.	"Kid Stuff (Believe in Yourself)"	David Conley, Bernard Jackson, David Townsend	2:43

== Personnel ==
Adapted from Discogs.

Surface

- Bernard Jackson – lead and backing vocals, raps, synthesizers, fretless bass, drum programming
- David Townsend – keyboards, synthesizers, guitars, synth bass, drum programming, backing vocals
- David "Pic" Conley – synthesizers, synth bass, flute, shakuhachi, drum programming, backing vocals

Additional musicians

- Brian Simpson – keyboards (1, 6), synth bass (1, 6), drum programming (1, 6)
- Bobby Wooten – acoustic piano (1, 9), synth strings (1, 9)
- Vassal Benford – keyboards (2, 5, 7, 8, 10), acoustic piano (2, 5, 7, 8, 10), synth strings (2, 5, 7, 8, 10)
- Joshua Thompson – keyboards (8), strings (8), synth bass (8)
- Gene Lennon – programming (8)
- "Bassy" Bob Brockmann – drum programming (1, 4), drum overdubs (4)
- Gene Lake – drums (4), keyboards (11), synth bass (11), drum programming (11)
- Guy Vaughn – drum programming (7), percussion (7)
- Regina Belle – backing vocals (2, 3), special love voice (2), lead vocals (3)
- Everett Collins – backing vocals (2, 10)
- Derrick Culler – backing vocals (2)
- Monet Jackson – lead vocals (8)
- Bianca Conley – vocals (9)

Strings (Tracks 4, 6 & 9)

- Bobby Wooten – arrangements and conductor
- Eileen Folson – contractor
- Belinda Whitney-Barratt – concertmaster
- Melanie Baker, Carlos Baptiste, Sandra Billingslea, Alfred Brown, Felix Farrar, Crystal Garner, Juliet Haffner, Marianne Henry, Cecelia Hobbs, Clarissa Howell, Jon Kass, Patmore Lewis, Alfred McCall, Diane Monroe, Garfield Moore, Maxine Roach, Richard E. Spencer, Lesa Terry, Brenda Vincent and Bruce Wang – string performers

== Production ==
- Surface – producers, mixing (3, 5, 7, 8, 12), mix assistance (9)
- John Falzarano – recording (1, 6)
- David Conley – recording (2–5, 7–12)
- Bobby Wooten – additional engineer (1)
- David Leibowitz – additional engineer (4)
- Bob Giammarco – digital editing
- Scott Canto – assistant engineer, digital editing assistant
- Paul Higgins – assistant engineer, mixing (3, 12)
- Kendal Stubbs – assistant engineer
- Bob Brockmann – mixing (1, 2, 4, 6, 10, 11)
- Carl Beatty – mixing (5, 7, 8, 9)
- Jose Fernandez – mix assistant (1, 2, 4, 6, 10, 11)
- Chris Savino – mix assistant (1, 2, 4, 6, 10, 11)
- Judy Kirschner – mix assistant (3, 5, 7, 8, 12), mixing (9)
- Jeff Toone – mix assistant (3, 12)
- Jose Rodriguez – mastering
- Stephanie McCravey – production assistant
- Carol Chen – art direction, design
- Todd Gray – cover photography
- Cesar Vera – inner photography
- Earl Cole – management

Studios

- Mixed at Marathon Studios, SoundTracks and Sorcerer Sound (New York City, New York); House of Music (West Orange, New Jersey).
- Mastered at Sterling Sound (New York City, New York).

== Charts ==
=== Weekly charts ===
Chart (1990–1991)	Peak position
Australian Albums (ARIA)	146
US Billboard 200	65
US Top R&B/Hip-Hop Albums (Billboard)	19

=== Year-end charts ===
Chart (1991)	Position
US Top R&B/Hip-Hop Albums (Billboard)	45

== Certifications ==
Region	Certification	Certified units/sales
United States (RIAA)	Gold	500,000^{^}
^{^} Shipments figures based on certification alone.
