= Thug Mentality =

Single by Krayzie Bone

from the album Thug Mentality 1999
- Released: January 20, 1999
- Genre: Hip hop
- Length: 4:22
- Label: Ruthless, Relativity, Mo Thugs
- Songwriter(s): Anthony Henderson
- Producer(s): Michael Seifert

Krayzie Bone singles chronology
"Thug Mentality" (1999)	"Paper" (1999)

"Thug Mentality" is a single by Krayzie Bone. Flesh-N-Bone, Layzie Bone & Wish Bone made an appearance in the video. The song was produced by Michael Seifert.

== Track listing ==
1. "Thug Mentality" (radio edit)
2. "Thug Mentality" (album version)
3. "Thug Mentality" (instrumental)
4. "Thug Mentality" (a capella)

== Charts ==
Chart	Peak position
US Hot R&B/Hip-Hop Songs	47
US Rhythmic Songs	28
