= Uh-Uh Ooh-Ooh Look Out (Here It Comes) =

Single by Roberta Flack

from the album Oasis
- B-side: "You Know What It's Like"
- Released: March 23, 1989
- Recorded: 1988
- Genre: R&B, Soul
- Length: 3:59
- Label: Atlantic Records
- Songwriter(s): Nickolas Ashford; Valerie Simpson
- Producer(s): Roberta Flack

Roberta Flack singles chronology
"Oasis" (1988)	"Uh-Uh Ooh-Ooh Look Out (Here It Comes)" (1989)	"Shock to My System (w/ Simon Climie)" (1989)

"Uh-Uh Ooh-Ooh Look Out (Here It Comes)" is the Ashford & Simpson-penned, 1989 single by Roberta Flack. The single was the follow-up to her number one R&B hit, "Oasis". "Uh-Uh Ooh-Ooh Look Out (Here It Comes)" stalled at number thirty-seven on the U.S. R&B singles chart, failing to chart on the Billboard Hot 100. In addition, a remix of the single made it to number one on the dance club play chart for one week. Ashford & Simpson recorded the song themselves for the soundtrack of the 1998 film, Down In The Delta.
