= Closer Than Friends =

Single by Surface

from the album 2nd Wave
- B-side: "Closer Than Friends (Jazz Version)"
- Released: 1989
- Recorded: February – July 1988
- Studio: The Lab (West Orange, New Jersey)
- Genre: R&B
- Length: 4:15
- Label: Columbia
- Songwriter: Bernard Jackson: David Townsend
- Producers: David "Pic" Conley, David Townsend, Bernard Jackson

Surface singles chronology
"I Missed" (1988)	"Closer Than Friends" (1989)	"Shower Me With Your Love" (1989)

"Closer Than Friends" is a song by American band Surface and the second single from their second studio album 2nd Wave (1988). It was their first of four number ones on the Hot Black Singles chart, staying at the top spot for two weeks, and peaked at number 57 on the Billboard Hot 100.

== Cover versions ==
- In 1997, Ms. Lydia remade the song, featuring Surface, the CD single peaked at number ninety-one on Hot R&B Singles chart.
