= Today (Today album) =

Studio album by Today
- Released: 1988
- Recorded: 1987–1988
- Studio: Soundworks Studio (NYC); Hillside Recording Studio (NJ)
- Genre: R&B; new jack swing
- Length: 44:58
- Label: Motown; MCA
- Producer: Teddy Riley; Gene Griffin; Bernard Belle

Today chronology
Today (1988)	The New Formula (1990)

Singles from Today
- 1. "Him or Me" Released: 1988; 2. "Girl I Got My Eyes On You" Released: 1989; 3. "Take It Off" Released: 1989

Professional ratings
Review scores
Source	Rating
AllMusic	2/5 stars

Today is a studio album released in 1988 by the American R&B group Today. The album was the group's debut album, and included the charting singles "Girl I Got My Eyes On You", "Take It Off" and "Him or Me".

== Track listing ==
Side 1
No.	Title	Length
1.	"Him or Me"	5:12
2.	"Girl I Got My Eyes On You" (Wesley Adams / Lee Drakeford / Gene Griffin / Larry McCain / Larry Singletary)	4:59
3.	"Take It Off"	5:30
4.	"Take Your Time"	4:48
5.	"Style"	4:02

Side 2
No.	Title	Length
1.	"You Stood Me Up"	5:09
2.	"Your Love is Not True" (Bernard Belle / Gene Griffin)	5:24
3.	"Lady" (Damion Adams / Larry Singletary)	4:29
4.	"Sexy Lady" (Bernard Belle / Gene Griffin)	5:24
Total length:		44:58

== Personnel ==
- Frederick Lee "Bubba" Drakeford – vocals
- Larry "Chief" Singeltary – vocals
- Larry "Love" McCain – vocals
- Wesley "Wes" Adams - vocals
- Bernard Belle – arranger, producer
- Teddy Riley – arranger, mixing, producer
- Gene Griffin – producer
- Dae Bennett – engineer
- Alan Gregorie – mixing, remixing
- Timmy Regisford – mixing, remixing
- Dennis Mitchell – engineer, mixing

== Charts ==
=== Weekly charts ===
Chart (1989)	Peak position
US Billboard 200	86
US Top R&B/Hip-Hop Albums (Billboard)	11

=== Year-end charts ===
Chart (1989)	Position
US Top R&B/Hip-Hop Albums (Billboard)	20
