= Theola Kilgore =

American singer (1925–2005)

Background information
- Born: December 6, 1925; Shreveport, Louisiana, U.S.
- Origin: Oakland, California, U.S.
- Died: May 15, 2005 (aged 79) Los Angeles, California, U.S.
- Genres: Gospel, soul
- Occupation: Singer
- Years active: c.1955 – c.1970
- Labels: Candix, Serock, KT, Mercury

Theola Kilgore (December 6, 1925 – May 15, 2005) was an American soul and gospel singer.

== Biography ==
Kilgore was born in Shreveport, Louisiana, and was brought up in Oakland, California. She began singing in church. Her first recording, on which she was billed as Theola Kilgord, was as the featured vocalist on "Look to the Hills" by the Mount Zion Spiritual Choir, released in 1955. While working as a gospel singer in the late 1950s, she befriended Sam Cooke's talent manager, J. W. Alexander, who introduced her to singer and record producer, Ed Townsend. Her first secular recording was "The Sound of My Man (Working on a Chain Gang)", an answer record to Cooke's 1960 hit, "Chain Gang".

She registered her biggest hit with "The Love of My Man", an adaptation of "The Love of God" as recorded by the Soul Stirrers. The record, on the Serock label, a subsidiary of Scepter Records, reached No. 3 on the R&B charts in 1963, and No. 21 on the Billboard Hot 100 chart.

Her follow-up record, "This Is My Prayer", reached No. 60 on the Hot 100 chart, after which Kilgore and Townsend launched their own KT label. Kilgore toured widely, but later follow-ups, mostly arranged by René Hall, were less successful. She also recorded for Mercury Records. One of her later singles, "It's Gonna Be Alright", became popular on the UK Northern Soul scene.

She died in Los Angeles, California, in 2005.
