= Falling in Love (Surface song) =

Single by Surface
- Released: June 1983
- Genre: Disco
- Length: 6:25 (12" version)
- Label: SalSoul (UK, SALT 104); SalSoul (US, SG 401)
- Songwriters: David Conley, Tony Byrd
- Producers: David Conley, Tony Byrd

Surface singles chronology
"Falling in Love" (1983)	"When Your Ex Wants You Back" (1984)

"Falling in Love" is the first single by the American post-disco/R&B trio Surface, released in the United Kingdom and the United States in 1983 on Salsoul Records.

The song reached number 84 on the Billboard R&B chart in summer 1983.

"Falling in Love" was written, produced and arranged by David "Pic" Conley and Tony Byrd.

== Track listing ==
=== UK & US 12" single ===
1. "Falling in Love" – 6:25
2. "Falling in Love (Instrumental)" – 7:30

== Recording credits ==
- Karen Copeland - Lead vocals
- David "Pic" Conley - Minimoog Bass and flute
- David Townsend - Fender Rhodes and guitar
- Kevin " Ignatz " Moore - Drums
- Gary Henry - Yamaha Grand & Prophet 5
- Produced by David Conley, Toni Byrd
- Written by David Conley, Toni Byrd
- Remixed by Shep Pettibone
- Produced and arranged by David "Pic" Conley, Toni Byrd
- Recorded at House of Music by Julian Robertson

== Chart performance ==
Chart (1983)	Peak position
UK Singles (OCC)	67
US Hot R&B/Hip-Hop Songs (Billboard)	84
