= Oasis (Roberta Flack album) =

1988 studio album by Roberta Flack

Studio album by Roberta Flack
- Released: November 1, 1988
- Recorded: 1988
- Studios: Right Track Recording, Electric Lady Studios, Unique Recording Studios, Marathon Studios and Skyline Studios (New York City, New York); Master Sound Astoria (Astoria, New York); Conway Studios and Sunset Sound (Hollywood, California); Bill Schnee Studios (North Hollywood, California); Lighthouse Studios (Los Angeles, California); Homeland Studio (London, UK)
- Genres: R&B, soul
- Length: 47:24
- Label: Atlantic
- Producers: Marcus Miller; Michael Omartian; Andy Goldmark; Jerry Hey; Barry Miles

Roberta Flack chronology
| Greatest Hits (1984) | Oasis (1988) | Set the Night to Music (1991) |

Singles from Oasis
- 1. "Oasis" Released: October 30, 1988; 2. "Uh Uh Ooh Ooh Look Out Here It Comes" Released: March 23, 1989; 3. "Shock to My System" Released: July 19, 1989

Professional ratings
Review scores
| Source | Rating |
|---|---|
| Allmusic | 3/5 stars |
| People | (favourable) |

Oasis is Roberta Flack's first solo album of newly recorded songs since 1982's I'm the One. (Subsequent to her 1983 duet album with Peabo Bryson: Born to Love, Flack had with producer Ahmet Ertegun in 1985 recorded fourteen lesser known mid-twentieth century R&B songs but the tracks, intended for a Miss Melody and the Uptown Harlem Stompers album, were not completed to the satisfaction of Flack, who put the project "on hold": the tracks remain unreleased.) Released 1 November 1988, Oasis features the number-one U.S. singles "Oasis" (R&B), and "Uh-Uh Ooh-Ooh Look Out (Here It Comes)" (Dance/Club Play).

== Track listing ==
1. "Oasis" (Marcus Miller, Mark Stephens) - 6:09
2. "All Caught Up in Love" (Siedah Garrett, Marvin Hamlisch) - 4:06
3. "Uh-Uh Ooh-Ooh Look Out (Here It Comes)" (Nickolas Ashford, Valerie Simpson) - 4:40
4. "Shock to My System"; duet with Simon Climie (Franne Golde, Andy Goldmark, Dennis Lambert) - 4:24
5. "You Who Brought Me Love" (Andy Goldmark) - 4:00
6. "Something Magic" (Marcus Miller, Mark Stephens) - 4:04
7. "And So It Goes" (Roberta Flack, Maya Angelou, Barry Miles) - 3:34
8. "You Know What It's Like" (Roberta Flack, Barry Miles, Brenda Russell) - 4:45
9. "And So It Goes (Reprise)" (Roberta Flack, Maya Angelou, Barry Miles) - 1:00
10. "My Someone to Love" (Roberta Flack, Marcus Miller) - 5:51
11. "(His Name) Brazil" (Roberta Flack, Henry Gaffney, Andy Goldmark) - 4:51

== Personnel ==
- Roberta Flack – lead vocals, backing vocals (1, 7, 9, 10), acoustic piano (10)
- Marcus Miller – keyboards (1, 10), bass guitar (1, 6, 10), backing vocals (1, 6, 10), synthesizers (6)
- Jason Miles – synthesizer programming (1, 4, 5, 10), keyboards (4, 5), additional synthesizer programming (6, 8)
- Michael Omartian – keyboards (2), drums (2), arrangements (2)
- Randy Kerber – keyboards (3, 11), synthesizers (7–9), synthesizer programming (11)
- Michael Boddicker – synthesizers (3)
- John Barnes – keyboards (4), synthesizer programming (4)
- Andy Goldmark – keyboards (4, 5, 11), synthesizer programming (4, 5, 11), drum programming (4, 11), instrumental arrangements (4), drum machine (5)
- Greg Phillinganes – keyboards (4, 5, 11), synthesizer programming (4, 5, 11)
- J. Peter Robinson – keyboards (4, 5, 11), synthesizer programming (4, 5, 11)
- Jeff Bova – synthesizer programming (6)
- Barry Miles – synthesizers (7, 9), arrangements (7–9), LinnDrum (8), sequencing (8), electric piano (10)
- Jeff Lorber – keyboards (11), synthesizer programming (11)
- Dann Huff – guitars (2)
- Michael Landau – guitars (3, 7–9)
- Paul Jackson Jr. – guitars (4, 11)
- Earl Klugh – acoustic guitar solo (7, 9)
- Chieli Minucci – guitars (11)
- Neil Stubenhaus – bass guitar (3, 7, 9)
- Nathan East – bass guitar (11)
- Harvey Mason – drums (3)
- Jimmy Bralower – drum overdubs (4)
- Steve Ferrone – drum overdubs (4)
- John Robinson – drums (7–9), Forat F16 (8)
- Buddy Williams – drums (8), Forat F16 (8)
- Steve Gadd – drums (10)
- Steve Thornton – percussion (1, 6)
- Paulinho da Costa – percussion (3, 5, 11)
- Michael Fisher – percussion (7–9)
- Don Alias – percussion (10)
- David Sanborn – alto sax solo (1)
- Larry Williams – saxophone solo (2), keyboards (5), synthesizer programming (5), synthesizers (7–9)
- Dan Higgins – saxophone (3, 8)
- Roger Byam – tenor sax solo (10)
- Jerry Hey – trumpet (3), arrangements (3, 7–9)
- Dennis Collins – backing vocals (1)
- Lani Groves – backing vocals (1)
- Chude Mondlane – backing vocals (1)
- Mark Stevens – backing vocals (1, 6)
- Brenda White-King – backing vocals (1)
- Phil Perry – backing vocals (3, 7–9)
- Simon Climie – lead vocals (4)
- Tawatha Agee – backing vocals (6)
- Yvonne Lewis – backing vocals (6)
- Lori Ann Velez – backing vocals (6)
- Gabrielle Goodman – backing vocals (7–9, 11)
- George Duke – backing vocals (11)
- Robert Henley – backing vocals (11)

=== Production ===
- Roberta Flack – executive producer (1, 4–11)
- Quincy Jones – executive producer (2, 3)
- Marcus Miller – producer (1, 6, 10)
- Michael Omartian – producer (2)
- Jerry Hey – producer (3, 7–9)
- Andy Goldmark – producer (4, 5, 11)
- Barry Miles – producer (7–9)
- Bibi Green – production coordinator (1, 6, 10)
- Sylvia Rhone – album coordinator
- Bob Defrin – art direction, design
- Tom Feelings – cover portrait

Technical credits

- Doug Sax – mastering at The Mastering Lab (Hollywood, California)
- Bruce Miller – engineer (1, 6, 10)
- Ray Bardani – mixing (1, 6, 10)
- David Ahlert – engineer (2)
- Terry Christian – engineer (2), mixing (2)
- Mick Guzauski – engineer (3), mixing (3)
- David Dachinger – engineer (4, 5, 11)
- Neil Dorfsman – engineer (4)
- Jay Rifkin – engineer (4)
- Tommy Vicari – mixing (4, 5, 11)
- Joe Ferla – engineer (5)
- Barney Perkins – engineer (5)
- Eric Calvi – engineer (7–9)
- Daren Klein – engineer (7, 9)
- Bill Schnee – mixing (7–9)
- Bob Brockmann – engineer (11)
- Glen Holguin – engineer (11)
- Steve Peck – engineer (11)
- Eugene "UE" Nastasi – assistant engineer (1, 5, 6)
- Corky Stasisk – assistant engineer (1)
- Debi Cornish – mix assistant (1, 10), assistant engineer (4)
- Doug Carlton – assistant engineer (2)
- Richard McKernan – assistant engineer (3), engineer (7–9)
- Paul Angelli – assistant engineer (4)
- Jack Rizzo – assistant engineer (4)
- Jack Rouben – assistant engineer (4)
- Jim Dineen – mix assistant (4, 11)
- Richard Joseph – assistant engineer (5)
- Angela Piva – assistant engineer (5)
- Pat MacDougall – mix assistant (5)
- Bridget Daly – assistant engineer (6)
- Danny Mormando – assistant engineer (6)
- Mike Kloster – assistant engineer (7–9)
- Wade Jaynes – mix assistant (7–9)
- Tom Durack – assistant engineer (10)
- Ryan Dorn – mix assistant (11)

== Charts ==
=== Weekly charts ===
| Chart (1988–1989) | Peak position |
|---|---|
| US Billboard 200 | 159 |
| US Top R&B/Hip-Hop Albums (Billboard) | 24 |

=== Year-end charts ===
| Chart (1989) | Position |
|---|---|
| US Top R&B/Hip-Hop Albums (Billboard) | 78 |
