= The New Formula =

1990 studio album by Today

Studio album by Today
- Released: 1990
- Recorded: 1989–1990
- Studio: Soundworks Studio (NYC)
- Genre: R&B; new jack swing
- Length: 52:37
- Label: Motown; MCA
- Producer: Jheryl Busby; Bernard Belle

Today chronology
Today (1988)	The New Formula (1990)

Singles from The New Formula
- 1. "I Got the Feeling" Released: August 17, 1990

Professional ratings
Review scores
Source	Rating
AllMusic	3/5 stars

The New Formula is a studio album released in 1990 by American R&B group Today. The album was the group's second album, and included the single "I Got the Feeling", along with a remix of "Why You Get Funky on Me", a #2 single that first appeared on the soundtrack for the film House Party, released earlier in the year. The album spent 27 weeks on Billboard's Top R&B/Hip-Hop Albums chart and peaked at #19 on November 24, 1990.

== Track listing ==
No.	Title	Writer(s)	Length
1.	"I Got the Feeling"	Dr. Freeze	4:05
2.	"Every Little Thing About You"	Charles Farrar / Troy Taylor	5:19
3.	"Self Centered"	Charles Farrar / Troy Taylor	5:00
4.	"Let Me Know"	Bernard Belle / Larry Singeltary	5:07
5.	"Why You Get Funky on Me (Remix)"	Gene Griffin	7:24
6.	"Trying to Get Over You"	Barry Coffing	5:29
7.	"I Wanna Come Back Home"	Nat Adderley	5:43
8.	"Home Is Where You Belong"	Troy Taylor	4:33
9.	"Tennis Anyone"	Bernard Belle / Larry Singletary	5:56
10.	"Gonna Make You Mine"	Charles Farrar / Troy Taylor	4:38

CD bonus tracks
No.	Title	Writer(s)	Length
11.	"No Need to Worry"	Bernard Belle / Lee Drakeford	5:21
12.	"My Happiness"	Bernard Belle	5:31

== Personnel ==
- Frederick Lee "Bubba" Drakeford – vocals
- Larry "Chief" Singeltary – vocals
- Larry "Love" McCain – vocals
- Wesley "Wes" Adams - vocals
- Bernard Belle – producer
- Dae Bennett – engineer
- Alan Gregorie – mixing, remixing
- Timmy Regisford – mixing, remixing
- Dennis Mitchell – engineer, mixing
- Gene Williams – keyboard programming
- Georg "Jojje" Wadenius – electric guitar
- Stanley Brown – associate producer, bass, keyboards
- Troy Taylor – drum programming, keyboards, percussion, piano, synthesizer bass
- Buddy Williams – drums
