= Surface (Surface album) =

Studio album by Surface
- Released: October 1, 1986
- Recorded: 1985–1986
- Genre: R&B, soul
- Length: 40:28
- Label: Columbia; Funky Town Grooves
- Producer: Surface; Larkin Arnold; David Rivkin

Surface chronology
Surface (1986)	2nd Wave (1988)

Professional ratings
Review scores
Source	Rating
Allmusic	link

Surface is the debut studio album from the band of the same name. Three years after releasing the midtempo boogie track "Falling in Love" on Salsoul, Surface released their first album self-produced and released in 1986 on Columbia Records. The album peaked at number 11 on the Billboard R&B albums chart and number 55 on the Billboard Top 200 albums chart. At the same time, the hit single "Happy" peaked at number 2 on Billboard Hot R&B/Hip-Hop Singles & Tracks. The other song, "Lately" peaked at number 8 on the Billboard singles chart.

== Track listing ==
#	Title	Writer(s)	Length
1.	"Let's Try Again"	David Conley, Bernard Jackson, Isham Jones, David Townsend	3:55
2.	"Happy"	David Conley, Bernard Jackson, David Townsend	3:57
3.	"We're All Searchin'"	David Conley, Bernard Jackson, David Townsend	4:30
4.	"Lately"	David Conley, Bernard Jackson, David Townsend	4:03
5.	"Gotta Make Love Tonight"	David Conley, Bernard Jackson, David Townsend	4:10
6.	"Who Loves You"	David Conley, Bernard Jackson, David Townsend	3:57
7.	"You're Fine"	David Conley, Bernard Jackson, David Townsend	3:26
8.	"Lady Wants a Man"	David Conley, Bernard Jackson, David Townsend	3:59
9.	"Girls Were Made to Love"	David Conley, Bernard Jackson, David Townsend	4:46
10.	"Feels So Good"	David Conley, Bernard Jackson, David Townsend	3:45

== Personnel ==
Surface

- Bernard Jackson - lead and backing vocals, bass guitar, guitars, synthesizer
- David Townsend - synthesizers, acoustic piano, guitars, bass synthesizer, backing vocals
- David "Pic" Conley - synthesizers, bass synthesizer, drum programming, percussion, flute, backing vocals

== Charts ==
=== Weekly charts ===
Chart (1986–87)	Peak position
US Billboard 200	55
US Top R&B/Hip-Hop Albums (Billboard)	11

=== Year-end charts ===
Chart (1987)	Position
US Top R&B/Hip-Hop Albums (Billboard)	37
