= Bobby Lewis (country singer) =

American country music singer-songwriter (born 1942)

- Born: May 9, 1942 (age 84)
- Origin: Hodgenville, Kentucky, United States
- Genre: Country
- Occupation: Singer-songwriter
- Instruments: Vocals, guitar, lute
- Years active: 1963–present
- Label: United Artists
- Website: bobbylewislute.com

Bobby Lewis (born May 9, 1942) is an American country music singer-songwriter. Between 1963 and 1985, Lewis released 10 albums and charted more than 25 songs on the Billboard Hot Country Singles chart. His biggest hit, "How Long Has It Been", peaked at number six in 1966. Lewis released a 26 country charted singles from 1966 to 1985.

Lewis earned the title "The Boy with the Lute" for his use of a six-string guitar-lute, and was inducted to the Atlanta Country Music Hall of Fame on November 29, 2014. He became a member of the Grand Ole Opry and continues to perform and record new material.

== Discography ==
=== Albums ===
Year	Album	US Country	Label
1966	Little Man with the Big Heart	—	United Artists
1967	How Long Has It Been	39	United Artists
1967	A World of Love	35	United Artists
1968	An Ordinary Miracle	40	United Artists
1968	From Heaven to Heartache	43	United Artists
1969	Things for You and I	—	United Artists
1970	The Best of Bobby Lewis	—	United Artists
1974	Too Many Memories	43	Ace of Hearts
1976	Portrait in Love	—	RPA
1977	Soul Full of Music	—	RPA
2009	Then & Now	—	Heart of Texas Music
2015	Here I Am Again	—	Heart of Texas Music
"—" denotes releases that did not chart.

=== Singles ===
Year	Single	Chart positions		Album
Year	Single	US Country	CAN Country	Album
1963	"I Miss All of You"	—	—	Singles only
1963	"Forty Dollars a Week"	—	—	Singles only
1964	"Crying in Public"	—	—	Singles only
1965	"Everybody's Baby"	—	—	Little Man with the Big Heart
1965	"Six Days a Week and Twice On Sunday"	—	—	Little Man with the Big Heart
1966	"I Hope You Find in Him; What You Were Losing in Me"	—	—	Single only
1966	"How Long Has It Been"	6	—	How Long Has It Been
1967	"Two of the Usual"	49	—	How Long Has It Been
1967	"Love Me and Make It All Better"	12	—	A World of Love
1967	"I Doubt It"	26	—	An Ordinary Miracle
1968	"Ordinary Miracle"	29	—	An Ordinary Miracle
1968	"From Heaven to Heartache"	10	10	From Heaven to Heartache
1969	"Each and Every Part of Me"	27	—	single only
1969	"Til Something Better Comes Along"	41	—	Things for You and I
1969	"Things for You and I"	25	—	Things for You and I
1970	"I'm Going Home"	41	—	The Best of Bobby Lewis
1970	"Hello Mary Lou"	14	9	Singles only
1970	"Simple Days and Simple Ways"	67	—	Singles only
1971	"He Gives Us All His Love"	—	—	Singles only
1971	"If I Had You"	51	—	Singles only
1971	"Today's Teardrops"	45	—	Singles only
1972	"We Ran Out of Time"	—	—	Singles only
1973	"Already Gone to My Heart"	—	—	Singles only
1973	"Here with You"	95	—	Singles only
1973	"Too Many Memories"	21	—	Too Many Memories
1974	"I Never Get Through Missing You"	32	—	Too Many Memories
1974	"Lady Lover"	47	—	Too Many Memories
1974	"I See Love"	78	—	Too Many Memories
1975	"Let Me Take Care of You"	71	—	single only
1975	"It's So Nice to Be with You"	79	—	Portrait in Love
1976	"For Your Love"	52	—	Portrait in Love
1977	"I'm Getting High Remembering"	74	—	Soul Full of Music
1977	"What a Diff'rence a Day Made"	81	—	Singles only
1979	"She's Been Keepin' Me Up Nights"	39	—	Singles only
1979	"Love Wouldn't Be Love Without You"	—	—	Singles only
1985	"Love Is an Overload"	91	—	Singles only
"—" denotes releases that did not chart or were not released in that territory.
