= Never Gonna Let You Down (Surface song) =

1991 single by Surface

Single by Surface

from the album 3 Deep
- Released: 1991
- Recorded: 1989
- Genre: R&B; soul
- Length: 3:46
- Label: Columbia; Sony
- Songwriter: Bernard Jackson
- Producer: Surface

Surface singles chronology
"All I Want Is You" (1991)	"Never Gonna Let You Down" (1991)	"You're the One" / "We Don't Have to Say Good-bye" (1991)

"Never Gonna Let You Down" is a song by American band Surface and the third single from his third studio album 3 Deep (1990). It peaked at number 17 on the Billboard Hot 100.

== Critical reception ==
Craig Lytle of AllMusic described the song as a "sentimental number whose title speaks for itself", and attributed its success to Bernard Jackson's "persuasive delivery".

== Charts ==
Chart (1991)	Peak position
US Billboard Hot 100	17
US Hot R&B/Hip-Hop Songs (Billboard)	24
