= Set the Night to Music (album) =

Studio album by Roberta Flack
- Released: September 17, 1991
- Studios: Atlantic Studios, Unique Recording Studios, The Hit Factory, RPM Studios, Soundtrack Studios, Skyline Studios and Right Track Recording (New York City, New York); Ocean Way Recording (Hollywood, California)
- Genres: Electronic; Funk / Soul; Pop
- Length: 50:09
- Label: Atlantic
- Producer: Arif Mardin

Roberta Flack chronology
Oasis (1988)	Set the Night to Music (1991)	Softly with These Songs: The Best of Roberta Flack (1993)

Singles from Set the Night to Music
- 1. "Set the Night to Music" Released: September 10, 1991; 2. "You Make Me Feel Brand New" Released: December 5, 1991

Set the Night to Music is a studio album released by American singer Roberta Flack, released by Atlantic Records on September 17, 1991, in the United States.

== Promotion ==
The title track from Set the Night to Music, written by Diane Warren and originally the 11th track of Starship's 1987 album No Protection, was remade as a duet with Maxi Priest. Released as the album's lead single, it reached number 6 on the Billboard Hot 100 and number 2 on the Hot Adult Contemporary chart. In Canada, "Set the Night to Music" peaked at number nine on the pop singles chart and number one on the Adult Contemporary chart. It became the 17th biggest Canadian Adult Contemporary hit of 1991.

== Critical reception ==
Professional ratings
Review scores
Source	Rating
AllMusic	3/5 stars

Rob Theakston of AllMusic gave Set the Night to Music a three out of five stars rating. Theakston said, "By the '90s, Roberta Flack had completely immersed herself in the adult contemporary portion of the radio world, and this 1991 album is concrete proof of that. Largely based on collaborations with fellow adult radio singer Maxi Priest, Set the Night to Music is an odd assortment of standards with a few new compositions thrown in here and there for good measure [...]The production values and choice of instrumentation give this album a slightly dated feel, with a greater emphasis placed on polished synthesizers over the warm tones of a Fender Rhodes or grand piano, but all in all it's a strong album that presents Flack's classy, distinct vocal styling in a palatable fashion."

== Track listing ==
All tracks produced by Arif Mardin.

Set the Night to Music track listing
No.	Title	Writer(s)	Length
1.	"The Waiting Game" (rap performed by Quincy Jones)	Claude Gaudette; Alan Roy Scott	4:38
2.	"Set the Night to Music" (duet with Maxi Priest)	Diane Warren	5:23
3.	"When Someone Tears Your Heart in Two"	Bob Gaudio; Madeline Stone	4:04
4.	"Something Your Heart Has Been Telling Me"	Bette Midler; Robert Kraft; Barry Reynolds	4:56
5.	"You Make Me Feel Brand New"	Thomas Bell; Linda Creed	4:58
6.	"Unforgettable" (duet with Mark Stevens)	Irving Gordon; Arif Mardin (Intro)	5:30
7.	"Summertime"	Sharon Robinson; Leonard Cohen	4:22
8.	"Natural Thing"	Jerry Barnes; Katreese Barnes	4:41
9.	"My Foolish Heart"	Ned Washington; Victor Young	4:39
10.	"Friend"	J. Barnes; K. Barnes	3:00
11.	"Always"	Irving Berlin; Roberta Flack (closing verse); Barry Miles (closing verse)	4:35
Total length:			50:09

== Personnel ==
Performers and musicians

- Roberta Flack – lead vocals, main backing vocals (1), arrangements (11)
- Steve Skinner – keyboards (1, 4), programming (1, 4), arrangements (1, 4), additional keyboards (8), drum programming (8)
- John Mahoney – Synclavier programming (1)
- Joe Mardin – additional keyboards (1, 4, 10, 11), additional programming (1, 4), keyboards (3, 7, 9), programming (3, 7, 9, 10), synth bass (3, 9), arrangements (3, 7, 10), string arrangements and conductor (7), keyboard solo (10), drum programming (11)
- Robbie Kondor – keyboards (2, 6, 11), programming (2, 6, 11), arrangements (2), additional arrangements (11)
- Robbie Buchanan – acoustic piano (3)
- David LeBolt – keyboards (5), programming (5), arrangements (5)
- Reggie Griffin – keyboards (8), programming (8), drum programming (8), backing vocals (8, 9), arrangements (8)
- Keith Barnhart – additional keyboards (9), additional programming (9)
- Greg Phillinganes – main keyboards (9), keyboards (10)
- Michael O'Reilly – guitars (4)
- Sammy Merendino – drum programming (1, 2)
- Errol "Crusher" Bennett – percussion (2)
- Andy Snitzer – alto saxophone (4), tenor saxophone (6, 9)
- Rob Paparozzi – harmonica (6)
- Arif Mardin – arrangements (1, 4, 6, 8, 9), string arrangements and conductor (2, 6, 9), vocal arrangements (8, 9)
- Shelton Becton – additional arrangements (8)
- Barry Miles – additional arrangements (11)
- Gene Orloff – concertmaster (2, 6, 7, 9)
- Jerry Barnes – backing vocals (1, 2, 4, 5, 8–10), vocal arrangements (8), arrangements (10), bass (10)
- Katreese Barnes – backing vocals (1, 2, 4, 5, 8–10), soprano saxophone (4), alto saxophone (8), vocal arrangements (8)
- Quincy Jones – rap (1)
- Maxi Priest – lead vocals (2)
- Mark Stevens – backing vocals (3, 5, 8), lead vocals (6)
- Tawatha Agee – backing vocals (4, 5, 7)
- Rachele Cappelli – backing vocals (4, 5, 6, 9)
- Fonzi Thornton – backing vocals (4, 5)
- Patti Austin – backing vocals (6)
- Lani Groves – backing vocals (6, 7)
- Cindy Mizelle – backing vocals (9)

Technical

- Arif Mardin – producer
- Joe Mardin – co-producer (3, 7)
- Michael O'Reilly – recording, mixing
- Jack Joseph Puig – additional recording
- David Richards – additional recording
- Bruce Buchanan – assistant engineer
- Bruce Calder – assistant engineer
- Steven Deur – assistant engineer
- Suzanne Dyer – assistant engineer
- Steve Holroyd – assistant engineer
- Jeff Lippay – assistant engineer
- Brian Pollack – assistant engineer
- Ken Quartarone – assistant engineer
- Jay Ryan – assistant engineer
- David Schiffman – assistant engineer
- Arthur Steuer – assistant engineer
- George Marino – mastering at Sterling Sound (New York City, New York)
- Suzane Koga – production coordination
- Lisa Maldonado – production coordination
- Bob Defrin – art direction
- Thomas Bricker – design
- Bridgette Lancome – photography

== Charts ==
Weekly chart performance for Set the Night to Music
Chart (1991)	Peak position
US Billboard 200	110
