= Love Zone (Surface album) =

Studio album by Surface
- Released: 1998
- Genre: R&B, soul
- Label: Victor Entertainment
- Producer: Surface

Surface chronology
3 Deep (1990)	Love Zone (1998)

Professional ratings
Review scores
Source	Rating
AllMusic	link

Love Zone is the fourth and last studio album by Surface, released by Victor Entertainment Inc. on July 14, 1998, and distributed for the Japanese market only. It was the last album to feature the best-known lineup of the group; Jackson, Townsend and Conley.

The group announced a reunion tour for mid-2005 and the recording of a new album; however, David Townsend died on October 26, 2005, at age 50 before the new album was completed.

== Track listing ==
#	Title	Writer(s)	Length
1.	"All I Wanna Do Is Hold You"	David Conley, Bernard Jackson, David Townsend	4:52
2.	"You're My Lady"	David Conley, Bernard Jackson, David Townsend	3:55
3.	"When I Hold You in My Arms"	David Conley, Bernard Jackson, David Townsend	3:46
4.	"Ah Ah Oo Oo Hmm" (Interlude)	David Conley, Bernard Jackson, David Townsend	0:22
5.	"My Story of Life"	David Conley, Bernard Jackson, David Townsend	5:00
6.	"Love Zone"	David Conley, Bernard Jackson, David Townsend	5:44
7.	"Eri, Tao, My My, and Pic" (Interlude)	David Conley, Bernard Jackson, David Townsend	0:37
8.	"Flippin'"	David Conley, Bernard Jackson, David Townsend	5:06
9.	"The Other Side of My Bed"	Raj Gupta, Thurston O'Neal, Myron Cheese, David Conley, Everett Collins, David Townsend	5:13
10.	"Shower Me with Your Love" (Unplugged Version)	David Conley, Bernard Jackson, David Townsend	5:13
11.	"Will You Wait for Me" (Interlude)	David Conley, Bernard Jackson, David Townsend	0:20
12.	"Falling in Love"	David Conley, Bernard Jackson, David Townsend	5:05
13.	"Quiet Storm"	David Conley, Bernard Jackson, David Townsend	4:26

== Personnel ==
Surface

- Bernard Jackson - lead & backing vocals, electric & acoustic guitars, bass, rapping
- David Townsend - electric & acoustic guitars, synthesizers, electric piano, drum programming, backing vocals
- David "Pic" Conley - saxophone, synthesized bass, drum programming, percussion, flute, orchestral hits, backing vocals
- Duane "Squire" Smith - trumpet
