= For Your Love (Ed Townsend song) =

1958 song performed by Ed Townsend

Single by Ed Townsend
- B-side: "Over and Over Again"
- Released: February 1958
- Genre: R&B
- Length: 2:31
- Label: Capitol
- Songwriter: Ed Townsend

Ed Townsend singles chronology
"My Need for You" (1957)	"For Your Love" (1958)	"A Wo-Man's In-Tu-It-Ion" (1958)

"For Your Love" is a song written and performed by Ed Townsend. It reached #7 on the US R&B chart and #13 on the Billboard Hot 100 in 1958.

"For Your Love"

Single by Peaches & Herb

from the album For Your Love
- B-side: "I Need Your Love So Desperately"
- Released: June 10, 1967
- Recorded: 1967
- Genre: R&B
- Length: 2:32
- Label: Date
- Songwriter: Ed Townsend
- Producers: David Kapralik, Ken Williams

Peaches & Herb singles chronology
"Close Your Eyes" (1967)	"For Your Love" (1967)	"Two Little Kids" (1967)

== Other charting versions ==
- The Righteous Brothers released a version of the song as a single in 1965 that reached #103 on the Billboard chart.
- Peaches & Herb released a version of the song as a single in 1967 that reached #10 on the R&B chart and #20 on the Billboard chart.
- Bobby Austin released a version of the song as a single in 1970 that reached #65 on the country chart.
- Gwen McCrae released a version of the song as a single in 1973 that reached #17 on the R&B chart.
- Bobby Lewis released a version of the song as a single in 1976 that reached #52 on the country chart.

== Other versions ==
- Prentice Moreland released a version of the song as the B-side to his 1962 single "Lover Supreme".
- Joe Tex released a version of the song as a single in Italy in 1967.
- Carla Thomas released a version of the song as a single as part of her Carla EP in 1967.
- Frankie Avalon released a version of the song as a single in 1969.
- Houston Person released a version of the song as the B-side to his 1970 single "Wadin" and was featured on his album, Truth!
- The Supremes and Four Tops released a version of the song on their 1970 album, The Magnificent 7.
- Cynthia Richards released a version of the song as a single in Jamaica in 1975.
- Bruce Springsteen released a version of the song as a soundchecked track from the Nugs.net recording of his May 23, 1988 concert at Madison Square Garden in New York City.
