= Ed Townsend =

American singer, songwriter, record producer (1929–2003)

- Born: Edward Benjamin Townsend; April 16, 1929; Fayetteville, Tennessee, U.S.
- Died: August 13, 2003 (aged 74) San Bernardino, California, U.S.
- Genres: Rhythm and blues, doo-wop, soul
- Occupations: Singer, songwriter, record producer
- Years active: 1950–2001
- Labels: Aladdin, Dot, Capitol, Carlton, Warner Bros., Challenge, Liberty, MGM, Curtom, Chocolate City, KT Records, Maxx Records, Tru-Glo-Town Records, EGA Records

Ed Townsend
- Education: Arkansas AM&N College
- Spouses: Cherrigale; Janice
- Children: 3
- Family: David Townsend

Edward Benjamin Townsend (April 16, 1929 – August 13, 2003) was an American singer, songwriter, and record producer. He performed and composed "For Your Love", a rhythm and blues doo-wop classic, and co-wrote "Let's Get It On" with Marvin Gaye.

== Biography ==
Townsend was born in Fayetteville, Tennessee, United States, in 1929, and his family soon moved to Memphis, where his father was pastor at an African Methodist Episcopal church.

The year Townsend graduated from high school, he was elected to the International American Methodist Episcopal Youth Council (IAMEYC) and traveled worldwide before enrolling in college the next year at the University of Arkansas at Pine Bluff (formerly Arkansas AM&N College). After graduating, he taught for a year. Although he never formally practiced law, he frequently used his law training to assist other entertainers in negotiating their recording and performance contracts.

In 1951, Townsend joined the United States Marine Corps and served in Korea. After his discharge, he recorded a number of singles for various labels, none of which made the charts. In 1958, he took his ballad, "For Your Love" to Capitol Records, hoping to interest Nat "King" Cole, but, impressed with his voice, Capitol signed him to record it himself. Dick Clark had just started American Bandstand on television and invited Townsend to sing the first month the show aired. He was an overnight success, and the song peaked at number 13 in the Billboard Hot 100. Later in 1958 he reached No. 59 with a rendition of "When I Grow Too Old to Dream".

Townsend had no further vocal hits of his own. In 1962, he wrote a song for soul singer, Jimmy Holiday, "How Can I Forget?", which was later covered by Ben E. King. Then he wrote and produced Theola Kilgore's "The Love of My Man." He also composed "Tears Of Joy", "Hand It Over", "I Might Like It", "Since I Found You" and "Foolish Fool". In the early 1970s, Ed Townsend teamed up with Marvin Gaye to co-write the song "Let's Get It On", and co-produce the album of the same title.

Townsend performed on the PBS television special "Rock, Rhythm, and Doo Wop" filmed at the Benedum Center in Pittsburgh, Pennsylvania on May 16 and 17, 2000. DVDs of the event were sold as fundraisers for PBS stations nationwide.

He died of a heart attack on August 13, 2003. Honored with a Purple Heart in the Korean War, Townsend is buried at Riverside National Cemetery in Riverside, California.

Ed's son David Townsend, of the band Surface, died at age fifty in 2005.

== Discography ==
=== Albums ===
| Year | Album | Record label |
|---|---|---|
| 1959 | Glad to Be Here | Capitol Records |
| 1959 | New in Town | Capitol Records |
| 1975 | Now | Curtom Records |
| 1979 | Townsend, Townsend, Townsend & Rogers (with Townsend, Townsend, Townsend & Rogers) | Chocolate City Records |

=== Singles ===
| Year | Title | Peak chart positions | | Record Label | B-side | Album |
| Year | Title | US | US R&B | Record Label | B-side | Album |
|---|---|---|---|---|---|---|
| 1957 | "Love Never Dies" | — | — | Aladdin Records | "Every Night" | |
| 1957 | "My Need for You" | — | — | Dot Records | "Tall Grows the Sycamore" | |
| 1958 | "For Your Love" | 13 | 7 | Capitol Records | "Over and Over Again" | |
| 1958 | "A Wo-Man's In-Tu-It-Ion" | — | — | Carlton Records | "In a Bordertown Cathedral" | |
| 1958 | "What Shall I Do?" | — | — | Capitol Records | "Please Never Change" | |
| 1958 | "When I Grow Too Old to Dream" | 59 | — | Capitol Records | "You Are My Everything" | |
| 1958 | "Getting by Without You" | — | — | Capitol Records | "Richer Than I" | |
| 1959 | "Lover Came Back To Me" | — | — | Capitol Records | "Don't Ever Leave Me" | New in Town |
| 1959 | "This Little Love of Mine" | — | — | Capitol Records | "Hold On" | |
| 1959 | "Be My Love" | — | — | Capitol Records | "With No One to Love" | |
| 1960 | "Stay with Me (A Little While Longer)" | 101 | — | Warner Bros. Records | "I Love Everything About You" | |
| 1961 | "Dream World" | — | — | Warner Bros. Records | "Cherrigale" | |
| 1961 | "And Then Came Love" | 114 | — | Challenge Records | "Little Bitty Dave" | |
| 1962 | "You Walked In" | — | — | Challenge Records | "I Love to Hear That Beat" | |
| 1962 | "Tell Her" | — | — | Liberty Records | "Down Home" | |
| 1963 | "That's What I Get for Loving You" | — | — | Liberty Records | "There's No End" | |
| 1964 | "Crying" | — | — | KT Records | "Get Myself Together" | |
| 1964 | "I Love You" | — | — | Maxx Records | "I Might Like It" | |
| 1966 | "I Want to Be with You" | — | — | Tru-Glo-Town; Records | "Don't Lead Me On" | |
| 1967 | "Who Would Deny Me" | — | — | MGM Records | "Mommy's Never Comin' Back Again" | |
| 1977 | "If a Peanut Farmer Can Do It (So Can I)" | — | — | EGA Records | "Take a Vow for Peace" | |

== Filmography ==
Townsend served as composer for:

- The Ultimate Thrill (1974)
