= Tony Bird (singer-songwriter) =

Malawian-South African folk singer-songwriter (1945–2019)

Anthony Bird, better known as Tony Bird (18 February 1945 – 17 April 2019) was a Malawian born South African folk rock singer-songwriter known for his Dylanesque vocals and for his songs describing life in colonial Africa from a progressive anti-colonial point of view.

== Biography ==
Tony Bird was born and grew up in the former colonial city of Zomba in Nyasaland (now Malawi) in Southern Africa. In 1970 he relocated to Cape Town where he made his first solo performances at the Space Theatre. Bird's unique style was reviewed favorably by the local press and promoters. He recorded two albums in the 1970s, the eponymous Tony Bird (1976) and Bird of Paradise (1978). In the 1980s Bird moved to London and toured internationally with Ladysmith Black Mambazo, who covered his song "Go Willie Go". In the late 1980s Bird settled permanently in New York City. In 1990 Bird recorded his comeback album Sorry Africa, on Rounder Records in the US and Mountain Records in Europe and Africa. The album was recorded at the Chocolate Factory in London and features guest musicians such as guitarists Arlen Roth and José Neto. Sorry Africa includes one of Bird's most popular songs, "Mango Time", which describes the happiness of the mangoes being ripe, once a year. The Boston Phoenix acoustic music critic Jon Herman once described Bird as possessing "a voice from Mars."

Bird died 17 April 2019 following a battle with cancer.

== Discography ==
=== Albums ===
- Tony Bird (CBS, 1976)
- Bird of Paradise (Columbia, 1978)
- Sorry Africa (Rounder, 1990)

=== Singles ===
- "She Came From the Karoo"/"Old Man's Song" (CBS, 1976)
- "Song of the Long Grass"/"Grinding Stone" (CBS, 1976)
- "Bird of Paradise"/"The Cape of Flowers" (CBS, 1978)
- "She Loves Someone"/"The Cape of Flowers" (CBS, 1976)
