= Michael Seifert (producer) =

American composer

Michael Seifert is an American multi-platinum award-winning music composer, record producer, arranger and audio engineer based in Cleveland, Ohio. Seifert's credits include work for Nicholas Megalis, Dominick Farinacci, Arooj Aftab, Weedie Braimah, Bokanté, Paul Simon, Tori Amos, Regina Spektor, Fountains of Wayne, Lifehouse (band), Colbie Caillat, Gerald Levert, Bone Thugs-n-Harmony, Too Short, 8 Ball & MJG, UGK, Chuck Mosley, Guided by Voices, Robert Lockwood, Jr., Kate Voegele, Mr. Gnome, Sweet Apple, Cobra Verde (band), Sad Planets, Alex Bevan, Snarky Puppy, and Kira Willey among others.

Seifert has scored independent films and major motion pictures, including composing, arranging, recording, and production work on Bram Stoker's Dracula (Special Edition), The Outsiders : The Complete Novel, Heart of Darkness, and The Godfather trilogy FFC restoration special edition for Francis Ford Coppola and the award-winning documentary, Romeo is Bleeding. He has composed original music and score for TV shows, including the Netflix original series Buddy Thunderstruck and Care Bears: Unlock the Magic (Boomerang Network/Cartoon Network). He has also composed, recorded, and produced music for Apple Music, Chipotle, Spotify, Pepsi, PlayStation, Xbox, Fox TV, CBS, MTV, American Greetings, Sports Illustrated, Reebok, MGM Casinos and many others.

A self-taught multi-instrumentalist, Seifert often performs on both sides of the glass when working on a project.
