= Never Let You Down (disambiguation) =

"Never Let You Down" is a 1999 song by Honeyz.

Never Let You Down may also refer to:

- "Never Let You Down", a song by Frankie from Priceless
- "Never Let You Down", a song by The Verve Pipe from Underneath
- "Never Let You Down", an episode of Flashpoint

== See also ==
- "I Will Never Let You Down", a 2014 song by Rita Ora
