= Mr. Gnome =

American alternative art rock band

mr. Gnome
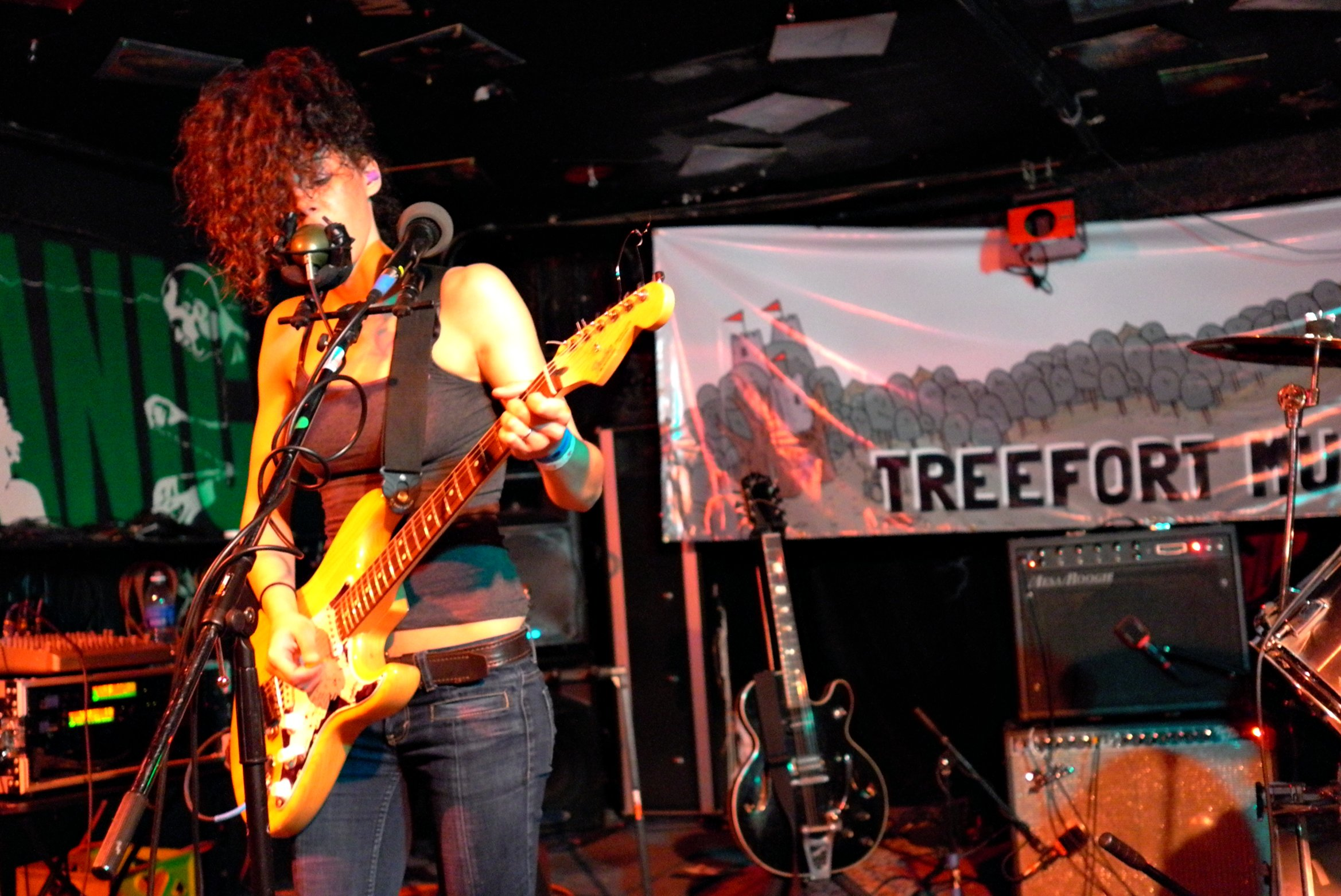
- Mr. Gnome at the inaugural Treefort Music Fest in Boise, Idaho, March 2012

Background information
- Origin: Cleveland, Ohio, USA
- Genres: Alternative rock, art rock, post-punk
- Years active: 2005–present
- Labels: El Marko Records & Publishing, LTD
- Members: Nicole Barille, Sam Meister
- Website: www.mrgnome.com

Mr. Gnome (stylized as mr. Gnome) is an alternative art rock married duo from Cleveland, Ohio, USA. Their eclectic oeuvre has been characterized as "an arresting mix of menace and mellifluousness," and "intriguing, theatrical." Nicole Barille notes of their stand-alone song Let The City Sail Away that as with many of her lyrics, "I tend to write about situations that are moments away from impending disaster." Mentioned in Rolling Stone in 2011 as a band to watch, their fourth album, The Heart of a Dark Star, was reviewed by NPR as being "a satisfying, conceptually ambitious work," "a raw, romantic sound [which they have] expanded and refined over several records."

== Discography ==
- Echoes on the Ground EP (2005)
- mr Gnome EP (2006)
- Deliver This Creature (2008)
- Heave Yer Skeleton (2009)
- Tastes Like Magic B-Sides (2010)
- Madness in Miniature (2011)
- Softly Mad B-Sides (2012)
- The Heart of a Dark Star (2014)
- Monster's Heart (2015)
- The Day You Flew Away (2020)
- A Sliver of Space (2024)
