= You Are My Everything =

1989 single by Surface

Single by Surface

from the album 2nd Wave
- B-side: "Feels So Good"
- Released: 1989
- Recorded: 1988
- Studio: The Lab (West Orange, New Jersey)
- Genre: R&B
- Length: 4:28
- Label: Columbia
- Songwriters: David "Pic" Townsend, David Conley, Everett Collins, Derrick Culler
- Producers: Dave "Pic" Conley, David Townsend, Bernard Jackson

Surface singles chronology
"Shower Me With Your Love" (1989)	"You Are My Everything" (1989)	"Can We Spend Some Time" (1990)

"You Are My Everything" is a song by Surface, released as a single in 1989. It was their third number one on the R&B singles chart in the U.S., as well as their third number one for the 1989 calendar year. The song charted on the Billboard Hot 100, peaking at number eighty-four.
