= Girl I Got My Eyes On You =

Single by Today

from the album Today
- B-side: "Sexy Lady"
- Released: 1989
- Recorded: 1988
- Genre: New jack swing; R&B
- Length: 4:59
- Label: Motown
- Songwriter(s): Wesley Adams, Lee Drakeford, Gene Griffin, Larry McCain, Larry Singletary

Today singles chronology
"Him or Me" (1988)	"Girl I Got My Eyes On You" (1989)	"Take It Off" (1989)

"Girl I Got My Eyes On You" is a 1989 single by R&B vocal group, Today. The single was their most successful of six chart releases on the Hot Black singles chart, peaking at number one for one week. As was the case with all their releases, none of Today's singles crossed over to the Hot 100, however, "Girl I Got My Eyes On You" peaked at number twenty-nine on the dance charts. The song chorus is interpolated from Carrie Lucas 1982 single "Show Me Where You're Coming From".
