= David Conley (musician) =

American jazz musician

- Born: December 27, 1953 (age 72); Newark, New Jersey, U.S.
- Genres: Jazz, R&B, pop
- Instruments: Flute, vocals
- Formerly of: Surface

David "Pic" Conley (born December 27, 1953) is an American jazz flute player, songwriter, and producer.

== Early life ==
Conley was born in Newark, New Jersey. Shortly after graduating high school, Conley purchased his first instrument, a flute, for $10 with the idea of selling it for double price. Conley instead taught himself to play the instrument.

== Career ==
Conley began his professional career when he moved to Los Angeles with the group Port Authority of Music, which included members David Townsend and Art McAllister in 1976. The group recorded an album produced by Ed Townsend, David Townsend's father. The group was signed to 20 Century Records, but the album was never released. Conley left the group to join Mandrill in 1977. In 1978, he made his television debut with Mandrill on the show Soul Train. Conley released only one album with Mandrill, New Worlds, in 1979. Conley left the group and after a short hiatus and became a founding member of Surface. Surface released their debut single, "Falling in Love", which peaked at #84 on Billboard's Black Singles chart. In 1985, Conley became a staff writer for Screen Gems BMI. He wrote music for Sister Sledge, New Edition, Gwen Guthrie, Isaac Hayes, Rebbie Jackson, The Jets, Sheila Hylton, Carol Lynn Townes, Jermaine Jackson, Melba Moore, Aretha Franklin, Classic Example, MN8, IMx, Kool G Rap, and others.

In 1986, Surface landed a record deal with Columbia and the group released their debut album in 1987. The album peaked at #55 on the Billboard 200 and #11 on Billboard's R&B Albums chart. In 1989, Surface released their second album, 2nd Wave, which peaked at #56 on the Billboard 200 and #5 on Billboard's R&B Albums chart. The album was certified Platinum by the RIAA. The single "Shower Me With Your Love" peaked at #5 on the Billboard Hot 100, #3 on Billboard's Adult Contemporary chart, and became Surface's second #1 R&B hit, topping Billboard's Hot Black Singles chart for a week in July 1989, staying on the chart for 20 weeks.

== Discography ==
=== Mandrill ===
- 1978: New Worlds (Arista)

=== Surface ===
- 1987: Surface (Columbia)
- 1989: 2nd Wave (Columbia)
- 1990: 3 Deep (Columbia)
- 1991: The Best Surface: A Nice Time for Loving (Columbia)
- 1998: Love Zone (Victor Entertainment)
- 2001: The First Time: The Best of Surface (Sony)

=== David Pic Conley ===
- 2008: Bird of Paradise (Independent)
- 2011: Bossa Quintet (Independent)
