= Oasis (Roberta Flack song) =

Single by Roberta Flack

from the album Oasis
- B-side: "You Know What It's Like"
- Released: October 30, 1988
- Recorded: 1988
- Genre: R&B, Soul
- Length: 6:09
- Label: Atlantic
- Songwriter(s): Marcus Miller, Mark Stephens
- Producer(s): Roberta Flack

Roberta Flack singles chronology
"We Shall Overcome" (1985)	"Oasis" (1988)	"Uh-Uh Ooh-Ooh Look Out (Here It Comes)" (1989)

"Oasis" is a 1988 single written by Marcus Miller and Mark Stephens and recorded by Roberta Flack. The title track off her 1988 album of the same name, the single was her first to chart on the Hot Black Singles chart in four years, peaking at number one on the Hot Black Singles chart for one week. The single was the first time in ten years that Roberta Flack made the top spot. "Oasis" did not chart on the Hot 100.

== Charts ==
=== Weekly charts ===
Chart (1989)	Peak position
US Adult Contemporary (Billboard)	13
US Hot R&B/Hip-Hop Songs (Billboard)	1

=== Year-end charts ===
Chart (1989)	Position
US Hot R&B/Hip-Hop Songs (Billboard)	28
