= The First Time (Surface song) =

Single by Surface

from the album 3 Deep
- B-side: Closer Than Friends"
- Released: September 7, 1990
- Recorded: June 2, 1989
- Genre: R&B; quiet storm
- Length: 4:16
- Label: Columbia
- Songwriters: Brian Simpson; Bernard Jackson
- Producer: Surface

Surface singles chronology
| "Can We Spend Some Time" (1990) | "The First Time" (1990) | "All I Want Is You" (1991) |

"The First Time" is a song by American R&B/pop music trio Surface, released in September 1990 by Columbia Records as the first single from their third album, 3 Deep (1990). It is written by Brian Simpson and Bernard Jackson and produced by the band. The song hit number one on the US Billboard Hot 100 in 1991 for two weeks, the trio's only chart-topper. It also spent one week at number one on the Billboard R&B chart and two weeks atop the Billboard adult contemporary chart.

== Charts ==
=== Weekly charts ===
| Chart (1990–1991) | Peak position |
|---|---|
| Australia (ARIA) | 103 |
| Canada Top Singles (RPM) | 18 |
| Canada Adult Contemporary (RPM) | 1 |
| New Zealand (RIANZ) | 7 |
| UK Singles (OCC) | 60 |
| UK Airplay (Music Week) | 36 |
| US Billboard Hot 100 | 1 |
| US Adult Contemporary (Billboard) | 1 |
| US R&B Singles (Billboard) | 1 |
| US Cash Box Top 100 | 1 |

=== Year-end charts ===
| Year-end chart (1991) | Position |
|---|---|
| US Top Pop Singles (Billboard) | 9 |
| US Cash Box Top 100 | 21 |

== Certifications ==
| Region | Certification | Certified units/sales |
|---|---|---|
| United States (RIAA) | Gold | 500,000^{^} |
^{^} Shipments figures based on certification alone.

== See also ==
- List of Hot 100 number-one singles of 1991 (U.S.)
- List of number-one R&B singles of 1991 (U.S.)
- List of Hot Adult Contemporary number ones of 1991
