= Have You Had Your Love Today =

Single by The O'Jays

from the album Serious
- Released: April 1989
- Genre: R&B, new jack swing, hip hop
- Length: 4:36
- Label: EMI
- Songwriters: Terry Stubbs, Derrick Pearson, Jonathan Burks

The O'Jays singles chronology
"Lovin' You" (1987)	"Have You Had Your Love Today" (1989)	"Out of My Mind" (1989)

"Have You Had Your Love Today" is a new jack swing song by The O'Jays, released as a single in 1989. The song features hip-hop artist Jaz-O, who was an EMI labelmate with the group at the time.

== Reception ==
The single would be the group's tenth and final number one on the Black Singles chart, and the group's first release on their new record label, EMI. "Have You Had Your Love Today" did not chart on the Hot 100.

== Charts ==
=== Weekly charts ===
Chart (1989)	Peak position
US Hot R&B/Hip-Hop Songs (Billboard)	1

=== Year-end charts ===
Chart (1989)	Position
US Hot R&B/Hip-Hop Songs (Billboard)	36
