= Today (group) =

American R&B vocal group

- Genres: R&B, new jack swing, gospel
- Years active: 1988–1991; 2010–present
- Label: Motown
- Members: Lee Drakeford; Larry Singletary; Wesley Adams; Larry McCain
- Past members: Bernard Belle

Today is an American R&B vocal group formed in 1988. The group comprised Frederick Lee "Bubba" Drakeford, Larry "Chief" Singletary, Wesley "Wes" Adams, and Larry "Love" McCain, childhood friends from Englewood, New Jersey.

== History ==
The group started in 1984 as the Gents and comprised Drakeford, McCain, William McNeir, Ronald Scruggs, and Bernard Belle. During an anti-drug benefit, the group received a meeting with the producer Teddy Riley who renamed the group Today and melded them into the current lineup. Riley helped them receive a deal with MCA Records. Belle left the group to join Riley in writing and producing.

As the head of MCA records urban department, Jheryl Busby, moved into Motown, he brought several acts with him, including Today, the Boys and the Good Girls. While touring the country, the groups were successful. Motown promoted Today as the new Four Tops, and the Boys and the Good Girls were promoted as the new Jackson 5 and new Supremes.

Today released their self-titled debut album in 1988. The single "Him Or Me" reached number 3 on the R&B charts and was followed by "Girl I Got My Eyes On You" which reached number 1. It was also their only song to chart in Britain, and peaked at number 94 on the UK Singles Chart in early 1989.

Riley did not help the group with their second album, The New Formula. Released in 1990, the album managed to chart three singles: "Why You Get Funky on Me", which was also featured in the movie House Party reached number 2 on the R&B charts. "I Got The Feeling" peaked at number 12 on Billboard's Hot R&B/Hip-Hop Songs chart and "I Wanna Come Back Home" peaked at number 46 on the Hot R&B/Hip-Hop Songs chart.

After the group broke up, Drakeford started a solo career as Big Bub while Singletary, Adams, and McCain wrote songs and tried unsuccessfully to get a deal as a trio. Drakeford released three albums as a solo artist: 1992's Comin at Cha (EastWest), 1997's Timeless (Kedar/Universal), and 2000's Never Too Late (Flavor Unit). His single "Need Your Love", credited to Big Bub feat. Queen Latifah & Heavy D, peaked at number 70 on the Billboard Hot 100 in 1997.

In 2010, it was announced that all four members reunited and were changing to the Gospel music genre and would work on a new album and a new single "Orchestrate" was released.

== Discography ==
=== Studio albums ===
Year	Title	Peak chart positions		Record label
Year	Title	US	US R&B	Record label
1988	Today	86	11	Motown
1990	The New Formula	132	19	Motown

=== Singles ===
Year	Title	Peak chart positions		
Year	Title	US R&B	US Dan	UK
1988	"Him or Me"	3	21	—
1989	"Girl I Got My Eyes On You"	1	29	94
1989	"Take It Off"	34	—	—
1989	"You Stood Me Up"	—	—	—
1989	"Take Your Time"	—	—	—
1990	"Why You Get Funky On Me"	2	—	—
1990	"I Got the Feeling"	12	—	—
1990	"I Wanna Come Back Home"	46	—	—
"—" denotes a recording that did not chart or was not released.
