= My Fantasy =

1989 single by Guy

Single by Guy

from the album Guy
- Released: July 1989
- Recorded: 1989
- Studio: Motown
- Genre: New jack swing
- Length: 4:00
- Label: Motown
- Songwriter(s): Teddy Riley, Gene Griffin

Guy singles chronology
"I Like" (1989)	"My Fantasy" (1989)	"Spend the Night" (1989)

"My Fantasy" is a 1989 single written by Gene Griffin and Teddy Riley.

== Background ==
The single featured Guy on vocals and was featured the 1989 film, Do the Right Thing, directed by Spike Lee. It was released as a single at the same time the band's debut album was having its singles released. It samples "Raw" by Big Daddy Kane.

== Chart performance ==
The single reached the number one spot on the Hot Black Singles chart for one week and number sixty-two on the Hot 100 and was Teddy Riley's most successful release on both charts, and was Guy's only number-one to date.

== Samples ==
- Ice Cube sampled the '123 swing it' of the 12" version, making a direct reference 'and you can new jack swing on my nuts'.
