= Eric Gable =

American soul/R&B singer (born 1967)

- Born: October 28, 1967 (age 57)
- Genres: Soul; R&B
- Occupation: Singer
- Years active: 1988–1996
- Labels: Orpheus Records; Epic Records

Eric Gable (born October 28, 1967) is an American soul/R&B singer. From 1988 to 1994, he released three studio albums, being signed to Orpheus Records/Epic Records, and had a number-one R&B hit "Remember (The First Time)". Another single, "Process of Elimination", peaked at number sixty-three in the UK Singles Chart in March 1994, his only UK chart entry.

== Discography ==
List of studio albums, with chart positions
Title	Album details	Peak chart positions
Title	Album details	US R&B
Caught in the Act	Released: 1989; Label: Orpheus	25
Can't Wait to Get You Home	Released: 1991; Label: Orpheus, Epic	44
Process of Elimination	Released: 1994; Label: Orpheus, Epic	55
"—" denotes a recording that did not chart or was not released in that territory.

=== Charting singles ===
Title	Year	Peak chart positions				Album
Title	Year	US R&B/HH	US R&B/HH Air	US Adult R&B	UK	Album
"Remember (The First Time)"	1989	1	—	—	—	Caught in the Act
"Love Has Got to Wait"	1989	13	—	—	—	Caught in the Act
"Your Precious Love" (duet with Tamika Patton)	1990	20	—	—	—	#1
"Hard Up"	1990	33	—	—	—	Caught in the Act
"In a Sexy Mood"	1990	43	—	—	—	Def by Temptation (Original Motion Picture Soundtrack)
"Can't Wait to Get You Home"	1991	12	—	—	—	Can't Wait to Get You Home
"Straight From My Heart"	1992	24	—	—	—	Can't Wait to Get You Home
"Process of Elimination"	1994	23	33	24	63	Process of Elimination
"—" denotes a recording that did not chart or was not released in that territory.
