= Remember (The First Time) =

Single by Eric Gable

from the album Caught in the Act
- B-side: "Instrumental version"
- Released: 1989
- Studio: Platinum Island Studios, New York, NY
- Genre: Soul
- Length: 3:37
- Label: Orpheus Records
- Songwriter: Lamont Coward
- Producer: Darryl Shepherd

Eric Gable singles chronology
"Remember (The First Time)" (1989)	"Love Has Got to Wait" (1989)

"Remember (The First Time)" is the 1989 debut single by New Orleans-born singer Eric Gable. The single was the most successful of Gable's eight singles on the Billboard R&B chart. "Remember (The First Time)" went to number one for one week on the chart.
