= Surface (band) =

American band

- Surface in 1987

Background information
- Origin: New Jersey, U.S.
- Genres: Pop; R&B; post-disco
- Years active: 1983–1994; 1999
- Labels: Salsoul; Columbia
- Past members: Bernard Jackson; David "Pic" Conley; Everett Collins; Karen Copeland; David Townsend

Surface was an American music group formed New Jersey, beginning in 1983. They are best known for their No. 1 pop and R&B hit "The First Time". During its heyday, the group consisted of singer/bassist Bernard Jackson (born July 11, 1959), David Townsend (May 17, 1955 – October 26, 2005), and David "Pic" Conley (born December 27, 1953).

== History ==
=== Early years ===
Surface was formed in New Jersey in 1983 with musicians David "Pic" Conley, David Townsend and Everett Collins at its nucleus, with Conley's girlfriend Karen Copeland on vocals.

David Townsend was the son of late singer/songwriter Ed Townsend (who had a big hit in 1958 with "For Your Love" and co-wrote Marvin Gaye's "Let's Get It On") and was also a member of the band Port Authority in the 1970s along with David "Pic" Conley, who was the bassist of funk band Mandrill from 1978 to 1981. Townsend and Conley met when Townsend was in a 1970s band in Los Angeles. During the 1970s, Townsend was a friend and colleague of drummer/writer Everett Collins, who worked with The Isley Brothers and founder of the band Sunrize, produced by The Isley Brothers with David Townsend as guitarist.

They then became resident songwriters for EMI and wrote New Edition's "Let's Be Friends" and Sister Sledge's "You're Fine". Encouraged by this success, the group dubbed themselves Surface and began recording their own material, releasing several post-disco/early-1980s-style tracks under the name.

In 1983, Surface released their debut single "Falling in Love", which peaked at No. 84 on the US R&B Singles chart, staying there for four weeks. In the United Kingdom, the song peaked at No. 67 on the UK Singles Chart. A year later, they released their second single "When Your Ex Wants You Back", which peaked at No. 52 on the UK Singles chart. Karen Copeland and David Conley then broke up. Copeland left the group, with Conley and Townsend meeting Bernard Jackson in 1984.

The three met when Jackson moved from Stamford to New York to pursue a music career. While Jackson was in New York, his godfather said that he should contact his nephew, David Townsend. They did, and Conley, Townsend and Jackson started writing music together. They wrote songs which would integrate the next female lead vocal. After auditioning several women, Surface, according to Conley, "never found another girl."

After failing to find a female lead singer to replace Karen Copeland, Bernard Jackson himself became the lead singer. The group then worked on recording its first full album. After leaving Surface, Karen Copeland faded into obscurity, eventually becoming a schoolteacher working at Our Lady Help of Christians, a Catholic school in East Orange, New Jersey. According to Conley and others, she is now deceased.

=== First major-label record deal ===
The trio then moved to Los Angeles, California, in search of more mainstream success. The song "Let's Try Again" came to the attention of Larkin Arnold of Columbia Records, who signed the band and released this track as a single in 1986. Also in 1986, Jackson met Brian Simpson, and recorded a demo tape of a track he had written, titled "The First Time". He believed it to be a hit and rented recording-studio time to get the best professional conditions for the track. Their self-titled first album followed in late 1986, featuring two more hit singles: "Happy", which reached No. 2 on the Hot R&B/Hip-Hop Singles & Tracks, and "Lately," which reached No. 8. However, "The First Time" did not appear on the album and remained unreleased.

The band's follow-up album 2nd Wave was released in 1988, and included some of the group's most successful hits. "I Missed" reached No. 3 on the Billboard R&B chart. "Closer Than Friends" was the group's first No. 1 hit, topping the R&B chart for two weeks, followed by "Can We Spend Some Time", which reached No. 5 on the R&B chart. 2nd Wave featured two other No. 1 R&B hits: "You Are My Everything", featuring popular R&B singer Regina Belle, topped that chart for two weeks, and the album's biggest hit, "Shower Me with Your Love" went gold, selling 500,000 units, reaching No. 1 on the R&B chart, and No. 5 on the Billboard Hot 100. Belle was also a guest vocalist on the album track "Hold on to Love". Thanks to the album's multiple hits, it achieved RIAA Platinum status—selling over one million copies.

=== Later years ===
The song "The First Time", originally recorded by Jackson in 1986, was featured on the band's third album 3 Deep in 1990, and was its first single. It was a hit, achieving gold sales status, and becoming the group's biggest hit to date. It topped both the Billboard R&B and Hot 100 charts.

The album continued releasing hits with "All I Want Is You", again featuring Regina Belle, which reached No. 8 on the R&B chart.

Surface recorded "A World of Our Own", which was featured as the theme song of the romance sequel Return to the Blue Lagoon (1991).

Jackson and Townsend left the group in 1994, and Surface disbanded. In 1998, they reformed and released Love Zone, and a few years later announced a return to live appearances with Conley, Jackson, Townsend and Collins—an effort that was abruptly cancelled when Townsend was found dead at his home on October 26, 2005, of unknown causes, at age 50, almost two years after his father Ed Townsend's death.

As of 2024, Bernard Jackson is signed to Groove Entertainment Inc. under the name "Surface (feat. Bernard Jackson)".

== Members ==
=== Best-known lineup ===
- Bernard Jackson - vocals (1984–1994)
- David Townsend - guitar, keyboards, vocals (1983–1994, d. 2005)
- David "Pic" Conley - bass guitar, percussion, saxophone, flute, keyboards, vocals (1983–1994)

=== Other members ===
- Karen Copeland - vocals (1983–1984)
- Eric "G-Riff" Moore - vocals (born August 23, 1971, Irvington, New Jersey) (1994)
- Everett "Jam" Benton - keyboards (1994)
- Everett Collins - keyboards, vocals, writer (1987–2005)

== Discography ==
=== Studio albums ===
Year	Title	Chart positions			Certifications	Record label
Year	Title	US	US R&B	AUS	Certifications	Record label
1986	Surface	55	11	—		Columbia
1988	2nd Wave	56	5	—	RIAA: Platinum	Columbia
1990	3 Deep	65	19	146	RIAA: Gold	Columbia
1998	Love Zone	—	—	—		Victor Entertainment
"—" denotes releases that did not chart.

=== Compilation albums ===
Year	Title	Record label
1991	The Best of Surface...A Nice Time for Loving	Columbia
2001	The First Time: The Best of Surface	Sony Music
2001	Perfect 10	Columbia
2005	Our World	Sony BMG
2008	Super Hits: Surface	Sony BMG
"—" denotes releases that did not chart.

=== Singles ===
Year	Title	Chart positions					Certifications
Year	Title	US	US R&B	US Adult	US Dance	UK	Certifications
1983	"Falling in Love"	—	84	—	—	67	
1984	"When Your Ex Wants You Back"	—	—	—	—	52	
1986	"Let's Try Again"	—	22	—	—	—	
1987	"Happy"	20	2	24	16	56	
1987	"Lately"	—	8	—	—	—	
1988	"I Missed"	—	3	—	—	—	
1989	"Closer Than Friends"	57	1	—	39	—	
1989	"Shower Me with Your Love"	5	1	3	—	—	RIAA: Gold
1989	"You Are My Everything"	84	1	—	—	—	
1990	"Can We Spend Some Time"	—	5	—	—	—	
1990	"The First Time"	1	1	1	—	60	RIAA: Gold
1991	"All I Want Is You"	—	8	—	—	—	
1991	"Never Gonna Let You Down"	17	24	17	—	—	
1991	"You're the One" / "We Don't Have to Say Good-bye"	—	35	—	—	—	
1992	"A Nice Time for Lovin'"	—	52	—	—	—	
"—" denotes releases that did not chart.
