= Shower Me with Your Love =

Single by Surface

from the album 2nd Wave
- B-side: "Shower Me with Your Love (Instrumental)"
- Released: May 1989
- Recorded: February – July 1988
- Studio: The Lab (West Orange, New Jersey)
- Genre: Soul
- Length: 4:56
- Label: Columbia
- Songwriter: Bernard Jackson
- Producers: David "Pic" Conley, David Townsend, Bernard Jackson

Surface singles chronology
"Closer Than Friends" (1989)	"Shower Me with Your Love" (1989)	"You Are My Everything" (1989)

"Shower Me with Your Love" is a 1989 single by American band Surface from their second studio album 2nd Wave (1988). The song was one of their most popular to date becoming the group's second number one on the Billboard Hot Black Singles chart, where it stayed for one week. "Shower Me with Your Love" was also a successful crossover hit peaking at number five on the Hot 100.

== Charts ==
=== Weekly charts ===
Chart (1989)	Peak position
Canada Top Singles (RPM)	27
Canada Adult Contemporary (RPM)	3
US Billboard Hot 100	5
US Adult Contemporary (Billboard)	3
US Hot R&B/Hip-Hop Songs (Billboard)	1
US Cash Box	5

=== Year-end charts ===
Chart (1989)	Position
US Billboard Hot 100	75
US Adult Contemporary (Billboard)	35
US Hot Black Singles (Billboard)	4
US Cash Box	49

== Certifications ==
Region	Certification	Certified units/sales
United States (RIAA)	Gold	500,000^{^}
^{^} Shipments figures based on certification alone.
