= Bernard Jackson (singer) =

American contemporary R&B singer

- Born: July 11, 1959 (age 66); Stamford, Connecticut
- Genres: R&B
- Occupation: Singer
- Instruments: Vocals, bass
- Formerly of: Surface

Bernard Jackson (born July 11, 1959 in Stamford, Connecticut) is an American singer/bassist. He was the frontman for the 1980s/early 1990s R&B band, Surface from 1984 to 1994. He sang on hits like the No. 5 US/#1 US R&B "Shower Me With Your Love" and the No. 1 R&B and pop hit, "The First Time." He released his self-titled debut album in 2000.

== Discography ==
=== Surface ===
- 1986: Surface (Columbia)
- 1988: 2nd Wave (Columbia)
- 1990: 3 Deep (Columbia)
- 1999: Love Zone (Victor Entertainment)

=== Solo ===
- 1997: Bernard Jackson
- Bernard Jackson – Bernard Jackson
- Label: Kristalyn Records – none
- Format: CD, Album
- Country: US
- Released: 1997
- Genre: Funk / Soul
- Style: Soul

Track list

1. Intro "Wake Up Call" (H.y.b.)
2. There's Only One Like You
3. My Life Is You
4. I Like What I See
5. I Just Wanna Talk To You
6. Why
7. Hollywood
8. Lovers For Life
9. Dreams
10. You Can Count On Me
11. My Story Of Life
12. I Will Never Do You Like That
13. I'm A Superstar
14. Peace

Notes

- Kristalyn Records
- 1997 PO Box 201 Cheshire CT 06410

=== 2001: Remember ===
- Bernard Jackson – Remember
- Label: Kristalyn Records – 154608
- Format: CD, Album
- Country: US
- Released: 2001
- Genre: Funk / Soul
- Style: RnB/Swing, Neo Soul, Contemporary R&B

Track list

1. They Don't Know Me
2. If This Is Wrong
3. Don't Let Go
4. Anything
5. Don't Give Up
6. Always Be Down
7. I've Got Love For You
8. Your My Life
9. I Pledge My Love
10. Your My Angel
11. Remember
12. God Will
- 2001: What's my Name
