= Greatest Hits (Bone Thugs-n-Harmony album) =

Greatest hits album by Bone Thugs-n-Harmony
- Released: November 16, 2004
- Recorded: 1993–2002
- Genre: Hip hop
- Length: 118:50
- Label: Ruthless
- Producer: Romeo Antonio

Bone Thugs-n-Harmony chronology
Thug World Order (2002)	Greatest Hits (2004)	Bone 4 Life (2005)

Professional ratings
Review scores
Source	Rating
Allmusic	3/5 stars
Rap Reviews	7.5/10 stars

Greatest Hits is a greatest hits double album that was released on November 16, 2004, by Bone Thugs-N-Harmony. It features Bone's most popular songs between the years 1994 and 2002.

The album spent 47 weeks in the Top R&B/Hip-Hop Albums chart, peaking at No.30.

== Track listing ==
Disc 1
No.	Title	Writer(s)	Length
1.	"Carole Of The Bones (Intro) - (Layzie Bone)"	S. Howse / Michael Seifert	0:52
2.	"Thuggish Ruggish Bone" (featuring Shatasha Williams)	Bone Thugs-N-Harmony / DJ U-Neek	4:39
3.	"Foe tha Love of $" (featuring Eazy-E and Jewell)	Antoine "Yella" Carraby / Al Henderson / S. Howse / Bryon "Bizzy" McCane / C. Scruggs / Eric Wright	4:32
4.	"1st Of Tha Month" (Bone Thugs-N-Harmony)	Al Henderson / S. Howse / Bryon "Bizzy" McCane / C. Scruggs	5:14
5.	"Shoot 'Em Up"	Bone Thugs-N-Harmony / DJ U-Neek	5:15
6.	"Buddah Lovaz" (Bone Thugs-N-Harmony)	Tony C / Bone Thugs-N-Harmony / DJ U-Neek	4:42
7.	"Days of Our Livez" (Bone Thugs-N-Harmony)	Bone Thugs-N-Harmony	5:48
8.	"Tha Crossroads" (Bone Thugs-N-Harmony)	Tommy Cowan / Al Henderson / S. Howse / Marvin Isley / Bryon "Bizzy" McCane / Tom Middleton / C. Scruggs	3:43
9.	"Thug Luv" (featuring 2Pac)	2Pac / Bone Thugs-N-Harmony / DJ U-Neek	5:07
10.	"Notorious Thugs" (featuring The Notorious B.I.G.)	Sean Combs / Al Henderson / S. Howse / S. Jordan / Bryon "Bizzy" McCane / Christopher Wallace	6:05
11.	"Breakdown" (featuring Mariah Carey)	Mariah Carey / Al Henderson / S. Howse / S. Jordan / C. Scruggs	4:42
12.	"All Good" (Krayzie Bone featuring Felecia)	Krayzie Bone / Ish Ledesma	3:57

Disc 2
No.	Title	Writer(s)	Length
1.	"Look into My Eyes" (Bone Thugs-N-Harmony)	Bone Thugs-N-Harmony / DJ U-Neek	4:19
2.	"Blaze It - (Krayzie Bone)"	Krayzie Bone	2:08
3.	"Get 'Cha Thug On - (Wish Bone featuring Tre)"	Wish Bone / DJ U-Neek	4:02
4.	"Thug Mentality" (Krayzie Bone)	Al Henderson / Michael Seifert	4:20
5.	"Resurrection (Paper, Paper)" (Bone Thugs-N-Harmony)	J. Karen Thomas	5:10
6.	"Ecstasy" (Bone Thugs-N-Harmony)	Al Henderson / S. Howse / Bryon "Bizzy" McCane / C. Scruggs	5:43
7.	"Weed Song" (Bone Thugs-N-Harmony)	Bone Thugs-N-Harmony	4:09
8.	"Still the Greatest" (featuring Big Chan)	S. Howse	5:28
9.	"Get Up & Get It" (featuring 3LW, Felecia & LaReece)	A.J. Gibbs / Al Henderson / S. Howse / Bryon "Bizzy" McCane / C. Scruggs	4:00
10.	"Money, Money" (Bone Thugs-N-Harmony)	Al Henderson / S. Howse / Bryon "Bizzy" McCane / C. Scruggs	5:26
11.	"Ghetto Cowboy" (featuring Powder P, Thug Queen & Felecia)	Krayzie Bone / Layzie Bone	5:24
12.	"Thugz Cry" (Bizzy Bone)	B.B. Gambini / Johnny Jackson	3:46
13.	"Home" (featuring Phil Collins)	P. Collins / Al Henderson	5:18
14.	"Cleveland is the City" (featuring Avant)	Al Henderson / S. Howse / Bryon "Bizzy" McCane / C. Scruggs	5:00

== Charts ==
=== Weekly charts ===
Chart (2004)	Peak position
US Billboard 200	95
US Top R&B/Hip-Hop Albums (Billboard)	30

=== Year-end charts ===
Chart (2005)	Position
US Top R&B/Hip-Hop Albums (Billboard)	67

== Certifications ==
Region	Certification	Certified units/sales
United States (RIAA)	Platinum	1,000,000^{^}
^{^} Shipments figures based on certification alone.
