= Set It Off (soundtrack) =

1996 film soundtrack

Set It Off: Music From the New Line Cinema Motion Picture

Soundtrack album by various artists
- Released: September 24, 1996
- Recorded: December 1995–July 1996
- Genres: Hip-hop; R&B
- Length: 1:01:23
- Label: EastWest
- Producers: 88 X Unit; Barry Eastmond; Darrell "Delite" Allamby; DJ Rectangle; DJ Scratch; DJ U-Neek; Keith Crouch; Organized Noize; Swoop & Bright Productions; The 45 King

Singles from Set It Off: Music From the New Line Cinema Motion Picture
- 1. "Missing You" Released: August 6, 1996; 2. "Don't Let Go (Love)" Released: October 22, 1996; 3. "Days of Our Livez" Released: September 24, 1996; 4. "Let It Go" Released: January 7, 1997

Professional ratings
Review scores
Source	Rating
AllMusic	4/5 stars
Entertainment Weekly	A−
The Village Voice	(2-star Honorable Mention)

The soundtrack for the 1996 American crime action film Set It Off, directed by F. Gary Gray, consists of a compilation of R&B and hip-hop music and an original score composed by Christopher Young.

Set It Off (Music From The New Line Cinema Motion Picture), a soundtrack album composed of R&B/hip-hop music, was released through East West Records on September 24, 1996. It was produced by Organized Noize, 88 X Unit, Barry Eastmond, Darrell "Delite" Allamby, DJ Rectangle, DJ Scratch, DJ U-Neek, Keith Crouch, Swoop & Bright Productions and The 45 King. It features contributions from the film star Queen Latifah, as well as Backbone, Billy Lawrence, Blulight, Bone Thugs-n-Harmony, Brandy, Busta Rhymes, Chaka Khan, Chocolate, Cool Breeze, Da 5 Footaz, En Vogue, Gladys Knight, H Squad, Lumberjacks, MC Lyte, Ray J, Seal, Simply Red, Tamia and X-Man.

The soundtrack was a huge success, debuting number four on the Billboard 200 and number three on the Top R&B/Hip-Hop Albums charts in the United States. It was certified platinum by the Recording Industry Association of America on November 12, 1996, for selling 1,000,000 copies in the US alone. The album produced seven charted singles: "Set It Off", "Don't Let Go (Love)", "Days of Our Livez", "Angel", "Come On", "Let It Go" and "Missing You", along with accompanying music videos. A music video was also directed doe the song "The Heist", even though it was not released as a single.

== Track listing ==
No.	Title	Writer(s)	Producer(s)	Length
1.	"Set It Off" (performed by Organized Noize and Queen Latifah)	Patrick Brown; Ray Murray; Rico Wade; Dana Owens; Andrea Martin; Ivan Matias; Steve Standard	Organized Noize	5:02
2.	"Missing You" (performed by Brandy, Tamia, Gladys Knight and Chaka Khan)	Barry Eastmond; Gordon Chambers	Barry Eastmond	4:23
3.	"Don't Let Go (Love)" (performed by En Vogue)	Brown; Murray; Wade; A. Martin; I. Martin; Marqueze Ethridge	Organized Noize	4:51
4.	"Days of Our Livez" (performed by Bone Thugs-n-Harmony)	Bone Thugs-n-Harmony; Tim Middleton; James Harris III; Terry Lewis	DJ U-Neek	5:49
5.	"Sex Is on My Mind" (performed by Blulight)	Corey Cooke; Stephanie Riley; Suamana Brown	Swoop & Bright Productions	4:18
6.	"Live to Regret" (performed by Busta Rhymes and Meka)	Trevor Smith; George Spivey; Andrea Gilbert; Nichole Gilbert; David Hall	DJ Scratch	4:40
7.	"Angel (U.K. Remix)" (performed by Simply Red)	Carolyn Franklin; William Nelson Sanders	Wyclef Jean; Jerry Duplessis (co.); Pras (co.); Simply Red (voc.)	3:39
8.	"Name Callin'" (performed by Queen Latifah)	Owens; Nichelle Strong	The 45 King	3:50
9.	"Angelic Wars" (performed by Goodie Mob, Cool Breeze and Backbone)	Robert Barnett; Willie Knighton; Fred Bell; Jamahr Williams; Brown; Murray; Wade	Organized Noize	3:21
10.	"Come On" (performed by Billy Lawrence and MC Lyte)	Billy Lawrence; Lana Moorer; Darrell Allamby	Darrell "Delite" Allamby	4:09
11.	"Let It Go" (performed by Ray J)	Keith Crouch; Glenn McKinney; Roy Pennon	Keith Crouch	4:53
12.	"Hey Joe (Live)" (performed by Seal)	Billy Roberts		4:20
13.	"The Heist" (performed by Da 5 Footaz)	Amber Hopson; Danielle Hollis; Ericka Martin; Jamali Carthorn; Kim Savage; Scott Kluesner	DJ Rectangle	4:04
14.	"From Yo Blind Side" (performed by X-Man, H Squad and Chocolate)	Anthony Revis; Mychal-Kaye Simmons; Victor Nathan Taylor	88 X Unit	4:04
Total length:				1:01:23

== Personnel ==
- Dana "Queen Latifah" Owens – vocals (tracks: 1, 8)
- Andrea Martin – vocals (track 1)
- Ivan Matias – vocals (track 1)
- Brandy Norwood – background vocals (track 2)
- Tamia Marilyn Washington Hill – background vocals (track 2)
- Gladys Knight – background vocals (track 2)
- Chaka Khan – background vocals (track 2)
- Cindy Mizelle – background vocals (track 2)
- Gordon Chambers – background vocals (track 2)
- Lajuan Carter – background vocals (track 2)
- En Vogue – vocals (track 3)
- Bone Thugs-n-Harmony – vocals (track 4)
- Trevor "Busta Rhymes" Smith – vocals (track 5)
- Meka – vocals (track 5)
- Blulight – vocals (track 6)
- Dee Johnson – background vocals (track 7)
- Lauryn Hill – background vocals (track 7)
- Sarah Brown – background vocals (track 7)
- Wyclef Jean – rap vocals, guitar, producer & mixing (track 7)
- Nichelle "Nikki D" Strong – additional vocals (track 8)
- Robert "T-Mo" Barnett – vocals (track 9)
- Willie "Khujo" Knighton – vocals (track 9)
- Frederick "Cool Breeze" Bell – vocals (track 9)
- Jamahr "Backbone" Williams – vocals (track 9)
- Billy Lawrence – background vocals (track 10)
- Lana "MC Lyte" Moorer – rap vocals (track 10)
- Darrell "Delite" Allamby – background vocals (track 10)
- William Raymond "Ray J" Norwood Jr. – background vocals (track 11)
- Dorian Abney – background vocals & handclaps (track 11)
- Keith Crouch – background vocals, keyboards, drums, handclaps, producer, arrangement & recording (track 11)
- Rahsaan Patterson – background vocals (track 11)
- Sherree Ford-Payne – background vocals (track 11)
- Seal Henry Olusegun Olumide Adeola Samuel – vocals (track 12)
- Amber "Cobra Red" Hopson – vocals (track 13)
- Danielle "Neb Luv" Hollis – vocals (track 13)
- Ericka "Knee-Hi" Martin – vocals (track 13)
- Jamali "Jah-Skillz" Carthorn – vocals (track 13)
- Kim "K-Bar" Savage – vocals (track 13)
- Cynee' – vocals (track 14)
- Chocolate – rap vocals (track 14)
- Martin Terry – guitar (tracks: 1, 3)
- Marvin "Chanz" Parkman – keyboards (track 1), grand piano (track 3)
- Phil Hamilton – acoustic and electric guitar (track 2)
- Alfred Brown – strings contractor (track 2)
- Barry Eastmond – keyboard and drum programming, producer, arrangement, strings conductor & engineering (track 2)
- Eric Rehl – synth programming (track 2)
- Tomi Martin – guitar (track 3)
- Preston Crump – bass (track 3)
- "Lil' John" Roberts – live drums (track 3)
- Andy Wright – additional guitar (track 7)
- Jerry Duplessis – bass & co-producer (track 7)
- Skinny Miracles – piano & organ (track 9)
- Glenn McKinney – guitar (track 11)
- Roy Pennon – bass (track 11)
- Spyda, Inc. – bass (track 13)
- Organized Noize – producers (tracks: 1, 3, 9), bass and drum programming & mixing (tracks: 1, 9), co-executive producers
- Tim "DJ U-Neek" Middleton – producer, recording & mixing (track 4), A&R direction (tracks: 4, 5)
- Swoop & Bright Productions – producer (track 5)
- George "DJ Scratch" Spivey – producer (track 6)
- Prakazrel "Pras" Michél – co-producer (track 7)
- Simply Red – vocal producers (track 7)
- Mark "The 45 King" James – producer (track 8)
- Scott "DJ Rectangle" Kluesner – producer (track 13)
- Mychal-Kaye Simmons – producer (track 14)
- Victor Nathan Taylor – producer (track 14)
- Blake Eiseman – recording (track 1), engineering (tracks: 3, 9)
- Kevin Parker – recording (track 1)
- Louis Alfred III – recording (track 1)
- Michael Cehelnic – recording assistant (track 1)
- Michael "Mike Fresh" Wilson – recording assistant (track 1), engineering assistant (tracks: 3, 9)
- Dexter Simmons – mixing (tracks: 1, 9)
- James Jay Nicholas – mixing assistant (track 1), engineering assistant (track 9)
- Erik Zobler – mixing (track 2)
- Bill Smith – engineering (track 2)
- Carl Nappa – engineering (track 2), mixing (track 10)
- Manny Marroquin – engineering (track 2)
- Stan Wallace – engineering (track 2)
- Colin Sauer – engineering assistant (track 2)
- Greg Pinto – engineering assistant (track 2)
- Kevin Stone – engineering assistant (track 2)
- Rick Alvarez – engineering assistant (track 2)
- Steve Genewick – engineering assistant (track 2)
- Neal H Pogue – mixing & engineering (track 3)
- Aaron Connor – recording & mixing (tracks: 4, 5)
- Virgil L. Davis Jr. – recording (track 4)
- Rick St. Hilaire – engineering (track 5)
- Warren Riker – engineering (track 7)
- Chris Hilt – engineering (track 8)
- Chris Theis – recording (track 10)
- Rich Travali – mixing (track 10)
- Booker T. Jones III – recording & mixing (track 11)
- Eugene Lo – recording & engineering assistant (track 11)
- Gregg Jackman – mixing & engineering (track 12)
- Justin Vickerman – engineering assistant (track 12)
- Tim Anderson – mixing (track 13)
- Tom Coyne – mastering
- Brian "Big Bass" Gardner – mastering (tracks: 4, 5)
- Sylvia Rhone – executive producer
- Toby Emmerich – executive producer
- Dana Sano – executive producer
- Lori Silfen – executive producer
- Tomica Wright – executive producer (tracks: 4, 5)
- Trevor Horn – executive producer (track 12)
- Chris "F.U." Tyson – executive producer (track 14)
- Merlin Bobb – co-executive producer
- Pilar McCurry – supervisor
- Kim Spikes – A&R coordinator
- Mark Haddad – A&R coordinator
- Rick Brown – A&R coordinator

== Charts ==
=== Weekly charts ===
Weekly chart positions for Set It Off: Music From the New Line Cinema Motion Picture
Chart (1996)	Peak position
Dutch Albums (Album Top 100)	43
German Albums (Offizielle Top 100)	32
New Zealand Albums (RMNZ)	33
US Billboard 200	4
US Top R&B/Hip-Hop Albums (Billboard)	3

=== Year-end charts ===
Year-end chart performance for Set It Off: Music From the New Line Cinema Motion Picture
Chart (1997)	Position
US Billboard 200	70
US Top R&B/Hip-Hop Albums (Billboard)	43

== Certifications ==
Certifications for Set It Off: Music From the New Line Cinema Motion Picture
Region	Certification	Certified units/sales
United States (RIAA)	Platinum	1,000,000^{^}
^{^} Shipments figures based on certification alone.

== Film score ==
Set It Off (Original Motion Picture Score)

Film score by Christopher Young
- Released: November 19, 1996
- Genre: Film score
- Length: 33:59
- Label: Varèse Sarabande
- Producer: Christopher Young

Christopher Young film scores chronology
Unforgettable (1996)	Set It Off (Original Motion Picture Score) (1996)	Head Above Water (1996)

Professional ratings
Review scores
Source	Rating
AllMusic	4/5 stars

Set It Off (Original Motion Picture Score), a film score album by American composer Christopher Young, was released on November 19, 1996, through Varèse Sarabande. It features contributions from singers Lori Perry, Roy Galloway and Peggi Blu, as well as musicians George Doering, Nick Kirgo, John Goux, Mike Lang, Carl Vincent, Brandon Fields, Michael Vaccaro, M.B. Gordy, Steve Schaeffer, Mark Zimoski, Pete Anthony and Sandy de Crescent.

=== Track listing ===
All music is composed by Christopher Young.

No.	Title	Lyrics	Length
1.	"Up Against the Wind" (featuring Lori Perry)	David Goldsmith	3:28
2.	"Set It Off" (featuring Roy Galloway)		4:08
3.	"Hell Blowin Hard"		2:19
4.	"Buttercrunch" (featuring Peggi Blu)		2:20
5.	"Rota Rooter" (featuring Roy Galloway)		4:03
6.	"Four-One"		1:57
7.	"Squeezebox"		1:38
8.	"Balboa Blood"		2:32
9.	"Toupee Soufflé"		2:23
10.	"Q. for a Day" (featuring Roy Galloway)		2:58
11.	"Flame on Fire"		2:10
12.	"Up Against the Wind (Reprise)" (featuring Lori Perry)		4:28
Total length:			33:59

=== Personnel ===
- Christopher Young – composer, producer, orchestration
- Lori Perry – vocals (tracks: 1, 12)
- Roy Galloway – vocals (tracks: 2, 5, 10)
- Peggi Blu – vocals (track 4)
- George Doering – guitar
- Nick Kirgo – guitar
- John Goux – nylon string guitar (track 1)
- Carl Vincent – electric bass
- Mike Lang – keyboards (track 1)
- Brandon Fields – saxophone
- Michael Vaccaro – saxophone
- Marvin B. Gordy III – drums
- Steve Schaeffer – drums
- Mark Zimoski – electronic percussion, synth programming
- Pete Anthony – orchestra conductor, orchestration
- Sandy de Crescent – orchestra contractor
- Robert Fernandez – mixing
- Christopher Kennedy – editor
- John Van Houten – electronic coordinator
- David Reynolds – supervisor
