= Set It Off (film) =

1996 film directed by F. Gary Gray

- Theatrical release poster
- Directed by: F. Gary Gray
- Screenplay by: Takashi Bufford; Kate Lanier
- Story by: Takashi Bufford
- Produced by: Oren Koules; Dale Pollock
- Starring: Jada Pinkett; Queen Latifah; Vivica A. Fox; John C. McGinley; Kimberly Elise; Blair Underwood
- Cinematography: Marc Reshovsky
- Edited by: John Carter
- Music by: Christopher Young
- Production company: Peak Films
- Distributed by: New Line Cinema
- Release dates: November 4, 1996 (Mann's Chinese Theatre); November 6, 1996 (United States)
- Running time: 123 minutes
- Country: United States
- Language: English
- Budget: $9 million
- Box office: $41.5 million

Set It Off is a 1996 American crime action film directed by F. Gary Gray and written by Kate Lanier and Takashi Bufford. The film stars Jada Pinkett, Queen Latifah, Vivica A. Fox, and Kimberly Elise (in her film acting debut). It follows four close friends in Los Angeles, California, who plan to execute a bank robbery—each doing so for different reasons—to achieve better for themselves and their families.

The film was a box office success, grossing over $41 million against a budget of $9 million. The film earned positive reviews from critics, who praised the characters, music and performances of the cast (particularly that of Pinkett and Latifah), as well as the chemistry of the four leading actresses. The soundtrack was a commercial success, peaking at number four on the Billboard 200 and number three on the Top R&B/Hip-Hop Albums. Additionally, the singles "Set It Off", "Don't Let Go (Love)", "Days of Our Livez", "Angel", "Come On", "Let It Go" and "Missing You" each charted.

== Plot ==
Los Angeles bank teller Francesca "Frankie" Sutton witnesses a robbery in the bank where she works. As a result, four people are killed, and Frankie is fired due to her recognizing one of the robbers from her Southern California neighborhood. During the investigation Detective Strode falsely implicates her as an inside accomplice. Frankie is forced to take a menial job at Luther's Janitorial Services with her three best friends, Lida "Stony" Newsom, Cleopatra "Cleo" Sims, and Tisean "T.T." Williams. The owner, Luther, treats them with disrespect and pays them paltry wages.

Stony's brother, Stevie, has been accepted into UCLA. Wanting to pay for his tuition, Stony begs her boss, used car salesman Nate, for an advance. Nate agrees to the advance on one condition: that Stony have sex with him, to which she reluctantly agrees. Stevie then admits to a livid Stony that he lied about getting into UCLA.

Tired of being mistreated, Frankie plans to commit a bank robbery with her friends. Cleo agrees, but Stony and T.T. are reluctant. Stevie is then gunned down by the police after being mistakenly identified as one of the robbers. Meanwhile, T.T.'s son is taken away from her by Child Protective Services, after he is accidentally poisoned at her workplace (T.T. had brought him with her, because she couldn't afford a babysitter). In view of all this, T.T. and Stony agree to join the robbery.

While casing a bank with T.T., Stony hits it off with Keith Weston who is the bank's manager. He and Stony begin dating. The four women embark on a series of successful bank robberies due to Frankie's inside knowledge of bank protocol with money and security. An investigation by the LAPD ensues. Detective Strode suspects that Cleo (because of her prior convictions), Frankie (because of her inadvertent connection to the earlier robbery and subsequent firing) and Stony (because of her brother's death) are involved. Yet he is unable to bring any of them in, since Frankie's careful planning has left him without sufficient evidence.

Concerned with the safety of their money, the four women stash the loot in an air vent at one of their work sites. When Cleo, Frankie, and T.T. arrive to work and discover they have a new boss, they realize that Luther has discovered the loot and fled with it.

Stony attends a banking event with Keith, and they end the night with sex. With the help of Blacc Sam, an arms dealer, the other three women track Luther to a motel, and find him sleeping with a prostitute. When the threesome demand that he return their stolen money, Luther instead threatens them with a gun; T.T. shoots him dead. Cleo steals the prostitute's driver's license as insurance and flees the hotel room with T.T. and Frankie. Cleo is brought in by Detective Strode for questioning about Luther's murder, but she intimidates the prostitute into not identifying her. When Stony discovers what has happened, she becomes disillusioned with her three partners. The foursome agree to skip town after pulling one more heist.

The women plan to rob the Downtown Federal Bank: the city’s largest, where Keith works. Concerned for Keith's safety, and not wanting him to know she's a bank robber, Stony asks him to meet her at a café on the far side of town. The four women pull off the robbery, stealing more money than they planned to.

Detective Strode and his partner arrive on the scene and order the robbers to surrender. Just as T.T. is about to do so, a bank security guard shoots and mortally wounds her. The guard, in turn, is gunned down by Stony. Enraged, Cleo opens fire to cover their escape. As they flee, T.T. dies in Stony's arms. The three surviving robbers, unable to outrun the police, split up. Cleo tells Stony and Frankie to keep her and T.T.'s shares of the stolen money.

Cleo leads the police on a high-speed chase until she is cornered, then wrecks her car by crashing through a police barricade. Refusing to surrender, she engages in a shootout with police and is gunned down, much to the dismay of her girlfriend Ursula, who has been watching the entire chase on TV.

Meanwhile, Detective Strode locates Frankie and demands that she surrender. Instead she sticks a gun in Strode's face, and reminds him of how he was a catalyst for this situation in the first place. Turning away from Strode, she is shot and killed from behind by his men.

Stony, who has successfully blended in with a tourist group heading to Mexico, tearfully watches Frankie's death from a passing charter bus. Detective Strode sees her from a distance but, out of guilt for his prior actions, lets her leave.

In Mexico, Stony cuts off her hair. She mourns the deaths of her brother and three friends. Then she calls Keith, both to assure him that she's all right and to thank him. He smiles. Stony drives off with half of the money from her and her friends' bank spree.

== Cast ==
- Jada Pinkett as Lida "Stony" Newsome
- Queen Latifah as Cleopatra "Cleo" Sims
- Vivica A. Fox as Francesca "Frankie" Sutton
- Kimberly Elise as Tisean "T.T." Williams
- John C. McGinley as Detective Strode
- Blair Underwood as Keith Weston
- Anna Maria Horsford as Ms. Wells
- Ella Joyce as Detective Waller
- Charlie Robinson as Nate Andrews
- Chaz Lamar Shepherd as Stevie Newsome
- Thomas Jefferson Byrd as Luther
- Samuel Monroe Jr. as Lorenz
- Dr. Dre as Black Sam
- WC as Darnell
- Vincent Baum as Jajuan
- Jeris Lee Poindexter as Pete Rodney
- Samantha MacLachlan as Ursula
- Tamara Clatterbuck as Luther's Girlfriend

== Production ==
Takashi Bufford said that he wrote the script with Pinkett Smith and Queen Latifah in mind even though he had not yet met them. The script was offered to New Line three times before finally being accepted, and the studio filled in more about why the female leads turn to bank robbery in a way that wasn't in the original script. Later Vivica A. Fox said: “Originally, with the script, we were throwing out pages daily. Like, 'No.' But that’s what you do when you have a good director who knows what he has to turn in. We were given the freedom with him to create things, and dialogue that would make sense. Everyone; once it started making sense, we came up with little moments, and it really was a team effort, to make that movie so successful."

== Release ==
The film had its premiere on November 4, 1996 at Mann's Chinese Theatre. It opened on 1,014 screens in the United States and Canada on November 6, 1996.

== Reception ==
=== Box office ===
On a budget of $9 million and an R-rating, Set It Off grossed $36,461,139 in the United States and Canada, $5,129,747 internationally, and total of $41,590,886 worldwide. Tribute stated that it was New Line Cinema's highest-grossing film of 1996. The film opened on Wednesday, November 6, 1996 and grossed $1.8 million from 972 theaters on its opening day, placing first at the US box office, however, for the weekend it finished behind Ransom starring Mel Gibson, which opened on the Friday, and the second week of Romeo + Juliet. Set It Off grossed $8.8 million for the weekend and $11.8 million in its first five days. The film's target audience was young African-American women but the opening day grosses suggested it reached other audiences. The grosses were also believed to have been helped by the popularity of the soundtrack, which at the time was the fifth best-selling soundtrack album of 1996. Despite the good opening, there were reports of violence in some theaters showing the film, including a shooting in Lakewood, California which left three people injured.

=== Critical response ===
Set It Off received generally positive reviews from critics and audiences. On Rotten Tomatoes, it has an approval rating of 71% based on 38 reviews, with an average rating of 6.4 out of 10. The site's consensus reads: "It may not boast an original plot, but Set It Off is a satisfying, socially conscious heist film thanks largely to fine performances from its leads." Audiences surveyed by CinemaScore gave the film a grade "A" on scale of A to F.

Roger Ebert stated that Set It Off is "a lot more" than a thriller about four women who rob banks. Comparing it to Waiting to Exhale, but "with a strong jolt of reality," he said, "It creates a portrait of the lives of these women that's so observant and informed." He gave the film three and a half stars, and added, "The movie surprised and moved me: I expected a routine action picture and was amazed how much I started to care about the characters." Gene Siskel gave it a thumbs down.

Stephen Holden of The New York Times compared Set It Off to Thelma & Louise, stating, "In formulaic Hollywood terms, Set It Off might be described as Thelma and Louise Ride Shotgun in the Hood While Waiting to Exhale. A pop psychologist might translate the story into a fable called Women Who Rob Banks and the Society That Hates Them." He added that among "the long list of Hollywood heist movies that make you root for its criminals to steal a million dollars and live happily ever after, F. Gary Gray's film Set It Off is one of the most poignantly impassioned," and that "[i]f this messy roller coaster of a film often seems to be going in several directions at once, it never for a second loses empathy" for the female robbers.

James Berardinelli said that if Set It Off owes any debt to films, those films are Thelma & Louise and Dead Presidents, rather than Waiting to Exhale. He stated that "[t]here's a freshness and energy in the way director F. Gary Gray attacks this familiar material that keeps Set It Off entertaining, even during its weakest moments" and that "[t]he concept of four black action heroines makes for a welcome change in a genre that is dominated by: (a) rugged white males with a perpetual five o'clock shadow, (b) rugged white males who speak English with an accent, and (c) rugged white males with the acting ability of a fence post." Berardinelli added that although "[t]he film doesn't get off to a promising start" and "[t]he first half-hour, which details the various characters' motives for becoming involved in a bank robbery, is unevenly scripted," and that some aspects of the plot are contrived, "[o]nce the setup is complete, however, things shift into high gear. The remainder of the film, which includes several high-adrenaline action sequences and some slower, more dramatic moments, is smoothly-crafted. There are occasional missteps, such as an out-of-place Godfather parody, but, in general, Set It Off manages to rise above these."

Humanities academic Kara Keeling asserts the film's significance to queer film studies within her article '"What's Up with That? She Don't Talk?," in which she establishes Cleo and Ursula's lesbian relationship's significance to butch/femme representation, utilizing concepts of blaxploitation and ghettocentrism.

=== Accolades ===
Director F. Gary Gray won an Acapulco Black Film Festival award for Best Director, in 1997, and the Special Jury Prize at the Cognac Film Festival.

1997 Acapulco Black Film Festival

- Best Director: F. Gary Gray (won)

1996 Independent Spirit Awards

- Best Supporting Female: Queen Latifah (nominated)

1997 NAACP Image Awards

- Outstanding Lead Actress in a Motion Picture: Queen Latifah (nominated)
- Outstanding Lead Actress in a Motion Picture: Jada Pinkett Smith (nominated)
- Outstanding Supporting Actor in a Motion Picture: Blair Underwood (nominated)

== Music ==
=== Soundtrack ===
Set It Off: Music From the New Line Cinema Motion Picture

Soundtrack album by Various artists
- Released: September 24, 1996
- Recorded: December 1995–July 1996
- Genres: Hip hop, R&B
- Length: 61:23
- Label: East West Records
- Producer: Various artists

Singles from Set It Off: Music From the New Line Cinema Motion Picture
- 1. "Missing You" Released: August 6, 1996; 2. "Don't Let Go (Love)" Released: October 22, 1996; 3. "Days of Our Livez" Released: September 24, 1996; 4. "Let It Go" Released: January 7, 1997

Professional ratings
Review scores
Source	Rating
Allmusic	link

The soundtrack was released on September 24, 1996, by East West Records and featured production from several of hip hop and R&B's top producers, such as Organized Noize, DJ U-Neek and DJ Rectangle. The soundtrack was a huge success, making it to number four on the Billboard 200 and number three on the Top R&B/Hip-Hop Albums. It featured seven charting singles: "Set It Off", "Don't Let Go (Love)", "Days of Our Livez", "Angel", "Come On", "Let It Go" and "Missing You". All of the singles had music videos made for them. The track "The Heist" by Da 5 Footaz also had a music video made, even though it was not released as a single. On November 12, 1996, the album was certified platinum by the RIAA.

No.	Title	Writer(s)	Artist/Performer	Length
1.	"Set It Off"	Ivan Martias / Andrea Martin / Organized Noize / Dana Owens / Steve Standard	Organized Noize featuring Queen Latifah	5:02
2.	"Missing You"	Gordon Chambers / Barry J. Eastmond	Brandy, Tamia, Gladys Knight & Chaka Khan	4:23
3.	"Don't Let Go (Love)"	Ivan Martias / Andrea Martin / Organized Noize	En Vogue	4:51
4.	"Days of Our Livez"	Bone Thugs-N-Harmony	Bone Thugs-n-Harmony	5:49
5.	"Live to Regret"	Trevor Smith / George Spivey	Busta Rhymes	4:18
6.	"Sex Is on My Mind"	S. Brown	Blulight	4:40
7.	"Angel"	Carolyn Franklin / Sonny Sanders	Simply Red	3:39
8.	"Name Callin'"	Dana Owens / Nichelle Strong	Queen Latifah	3:50
9.	"Angelic Wars"	Robert Barnett / Fred Bell / Willie Knighton / Organized Noize / Jamahr Williams	Goodie Mob	3:21
10.	"Come On"	Darrell "Delite" Allamby / Billy Lawrence	Billy Lawrence featuring MC Lyte	4:09
11.	"Let It Go"	Keith Crouch / Glenn McKinney / Roy Dog Pennon	Ray J	4:53
12.	"Hey Joe" (Live)	Billy Roberts	Seal	4:20
13.	"The Heist"	Jamali Cathorn / Ericka Martin / Kim Savage	Da 5 Footaz	4:04
14.	"From Yo Blind Side"		X-Man featuring H Squad	4:04
Total length:				61:23

"Up Against the Wind" (runtime – 4:28), sung by Lori Perri and produced by Christopher Young, is not included in the soundtrack.

Year	Album	Peak chart positions		Certifications
Year	Album	U.S.	U.S. R&B	Certifications
1996	Set It Off: Released: September 24, 1996; Label: East West Records	4	3	US: Platinum

=== Score ===
Set It Off (Original Motion Picture Score)

Film score by Christopher Young
- Released: November 19, 1996
- Genre: Film score
- Length: 34:30
- Label: Varèse Sarabande
- Producer: Christopher Young

Christopher Young film scores chronology
Unforgettable (1996)	Set It Off (Original Motion Picture Score) (1996)	Head Above Water (1996)

Varèse Sarabande issued an album of Christopher Young's score for the film, including Lori Perri's "Up Against the Wind" on November 19, 1996.

No.	Title	Artist/Performer	Length
1.	"Up Against the Wind"	Lori Perri	3:29
2.	"Set It Off"		4:08
3.	"Hell Blowin Hard"		2:19
4.	"Buttercrunch"		2:20
5.	"Rota Rooter"		4:03
6.	"Four-One"		1:57
7.	"Squeezebox"		1:38
8.	"Balboa Blood"		2:32
9.	"Toupee Souffle"		2:23
10.	"Q. for a Day"		2:58
11.	"Flame on Fire"		2:10
12.	"Up Against the Wind (Reprise)"	Lori Perri	4:28
Total length:			34:30

== Legacy ==
=== Cultural impact ===
Set It Off has since been regarded as a landmark in Black cinema as well as a cult classic. The film has also been the center of many parodies and attracted spoofs in television, YouTube and social media alike with creators and actors recreating memorable scenes from the movie, particularly the rooftop scene; Stony's desperate decision to obtain money for her brother; the fight between Cleo and Stony and the final standoff scene. Notable social media creators and stand-up comedian/actor KevOnStage appeared as a detective in one of the 2014 parodies with content creators All Def Women, as well as social media actor and comedian Minks (officalminks) recreated and spoofed the final standoff scene in 2018.

Queen Latifah reprised her role as Cleo in a 1997 MADtv sketch with Phil Lamarr.

Queen Latifah also surprised Anthony Anderson with the cast reunion as a spoof while presenting Best Male R&B artist at the 2005 BET Awards trying to antagonize and rob him of his clothing.

The climactic song "Up Against the Wind" sung by Lori Perry became a popular viral internet meme sound bite in the late 2010s used in many TikTok and Instagram videos. The song was also sampled by many popular rappers including The Game, Lil Baby and Big Sean.

When asked in an interview with PeopleTV about a possible sequel to the film, Pinkett-Smith said: "That has been going on for years...my answer always is, there's no way I can do Set if Off without Vivica, Queen and Kimberly, that's just not gonna happen. Sometimes you gotta let a classic be a classic and just don't touch it." ET Live asked Fox about the possibility of Issa Rae creating a sequel, to which she replied, "It's a classic, leave it alone. There's absolutely no reason to try to redo it, it's been done, and we did it so well that people are absolutely going to compare it and I think that's her taking on a tremendous chore because that film has become a cult classic and some things are better left (alone)...create your own thing...and if it's not good they are going to slay her for it."

Time listed Set it Off as one of "The 25 Best Heist Movies" in 2017.

=== Stage play adaptation ===
Stage theater director and producer Je’Caryous Johnson, a well known renowned playwright in urban stage play productions, adapted Set It Off as an Off-Broadway play titled SET IT OFF: Live on Stage, with the blessing of creator and writer of the movie, Takashi Bufford. The stage play had a multi-city tour production run in 2018 and 2021 with Da Brat starring as Cleo in both 2018 and 2021 productions. The 2018 main cast featured Kyla Pratt as Stony, LeToya Luckett as Frankie and Demetria McKinney as Tisean (T.T.). The 2021 cast featured Keshia Knight Pulliam as Tisean, Lil' Mo and Vanessa Simmons as Frankie (alternating shows), Drew Sidora, LaToya London and Marquita Goings as Stony (alternating shows) and Leon Robinson as Keith Weston. The ensemble featured James "Lil' JJ" Lewis, Bakesta King, Michael Finn, Ericka Pinkett, Jason Raines, Steven J. Scott and Carson Pursley.

The 2020 production run was halted due to the COVID-19 pandemic which led to a few rescheduling dates to premiere in early 2021 but was again delayed and resumed in October and officially closed with its final tour run in November 2021. The stage production ran for two and a half hours. The play was received with mixed reviews.

Sequel Novel

In April 29, 2020 Writer Takashi Bufford would release the Sequel novel Called “ Stony's Story: Because SET IT OFF was just the beginning.” Where it picks off right as the movie had ended. It also serves as an alternate ending Where Frankie and Cleo is in jail, as T.T is the only one who is dead in the gang in the book.
