= The Collection (Bone Thugs-N-Harmony album) =

Compilation album series by Bone Thugs-N-Harmony
- Released: November 24, 1998 (Volume One); November 14, 2000 (Volume Two)
- Recorded: 1993–1998 & 1994–2000
- Genres: Hip hop; gangsta rap
- Length: 1:07:56; 54:95
- Label: Ruthless
- Producers: Volume one: DJ Yella; DJ U-Neek; Mariah Carey; Stevie J; Puff Daddy; L. T. Hutton; Damon Elliott; Krayzie Bone; Volume Two: LT Hutton; Craig B; KLC; Rick Taylor; Jermaine Dupri; DJ U-Neek

Bone Thugs-N-Harmony chronology
The Art of War (1997)	The Collection (1998)	BTNHResurrection (2000)

Volume Two

Volume One:
Review scores
Source	Rating
Allmusic	4/5 stars
Entertainment Weekly	A−
Q	4/5 stars
Robert Christgau	(neither)
The Rolling Stone Album Guide	4/5 stars

Volume Two:
Review scores
Source	Rating
Allmusic	2.5/5 stars
The Rolling Stone Album Guide	4/5 stars

The Collection is an album series by American hip hop group Bone Thugs-N-Harmony. Volume One, consisting of hit songs between 1994 and 1998, was released on November 24, 1998, by Ruthless Records. Volume Two was released on November 14, 2000.

"B.N.K" is a remake of a song by Eazy-E entitled "Black Nigga Killa". The original version, with 3 verses by Eazy-E and none by Bone Thugs-n-Harmony, can be found on Ruthless Records Tenth Anniversary: Decade of Game.

== Track listing ==
Volume 1
No.	Title	Producer(s)	Length
1.	"Foe Tha Love Of $" (featuring Eazy-E & Shatasha Williams)	DJ Yella	9:05
2.	"1st Of Tha Month"	DJ U-Neek	5:12
3.	"Shoot 'Em Up"	DJ U-Neek	5:15
4.	"Days Of Our Livez"	DJ U-Neek	5:49
5.	"Breakdown (Mo Thugs Remix)" (with Mariah Carey)	Mariah Carey; Stevie J; Sean "Puffy" Combs	4:57
6.	"Notorious Thugs" (featuring The Notorious B.I.G.)	Stevie J; Sean "Puffy" Combs	6:02
7.	"B.N.K." (featuring Eazy-E)	LT Hutton	5:00
8.	"War (Battlecry Remix)"	E-A-Ski; CMT	3:26
9.	"Crossroad (Original Mix)"	DJ U-Neek	3:32
10.	"Body Rott"	DJ U-Neek	5:01
11.	"Thuggish Ruggish Bone" (featuring Shatasha Williams)	DJ U-Neek	4:40
12.	"Fuck Tha Police (Remix)"	Krayzie Bone	5:01
13.	"P.O.D." (Bonus track)	DJ U-Neek	4:26
14.	"If I Could Teach The World (D.J. U-Neek Remix)" (European bonus track)	DJ U-Neek	4:54

Volume 2
No.	Title	Producer(s)	Length
1.	"C Land I.A." (Bizzy Bone & Flesh-N-Bone)	LT Hutton	4:31
2.	"Don't Hate On Me" (Krayzie Bone featuring Jermaine Dupri & Da Brat)	Jermaine Dupri	4:13
3.	"Thug Luv" (featuring 2Pac)	DJ U-Neek	5:07
4.	"Hook It Up" (featuring Master P & Silkk The Shocker)	KLC; Craig B	2:51
5.	"2 Glocks (U-Neek's Remix)"	DJ U-Neek	4:35
6.	"Look Into My Eyes (Atlantis Remix)"	DJ U-Neek	4:49
7.	"All Good" (Krayzie Bone featuring Felecia)	"Disco" Rick Taylor	3:56
8.	"Weedman" (Bizzy Bone featuring Blulight)	DJ U-Neek	3:56
9.	"Frontline Warriors" (Bizzy Bone & Layzie Bone featuring Big B)	LT Hutton	4:08
10.	"Change The World (U-Neek's Remix)" (featuring Big B)	DJ U-Neek	5:19
11.	"Can't Give It Up (Rock Remix)"	LT Hutton	5:10
12.	"Ghetto Cowboy" (Krayzie Bone & Layzie Bone featuring Powder P, Thug Queen & Felecia)	Krayzie Bone	5:24
13.	"Sleepwalkers" (featuring Eazy-E)	DJ U-Neek	3:32

== Reception ==
"A fine introduction to the harmonious outfit's strangely smooth, yet sweary sound." – Tom Doyle, Q.

=== DVD Easter egg ===
In the DVD special features section, go to "Change the World" (extended version) and press the right arrow button; this will take you to six Bone Thugs-n-Harmony commercials.

== Charts ==
=== Weekly charts ===
Chart (1998)	Peak position
US Billboard 200	32
US Top R&B/Hip-Hop Albums (Billboard)	12

=== Year-end charts ===
Chart (1999)	Position
US Billboard 200	160
US Top R&B/Hip-Hop Albums (Billboard)	80

== Certifications ==
Region	Certification	Certified units/sales
United States (RIAA)	Platinum	1,000,000^{^}
^{^} Shipments figures based on certification alone.
