= Virgil L. Davis Jr. =

American record producer

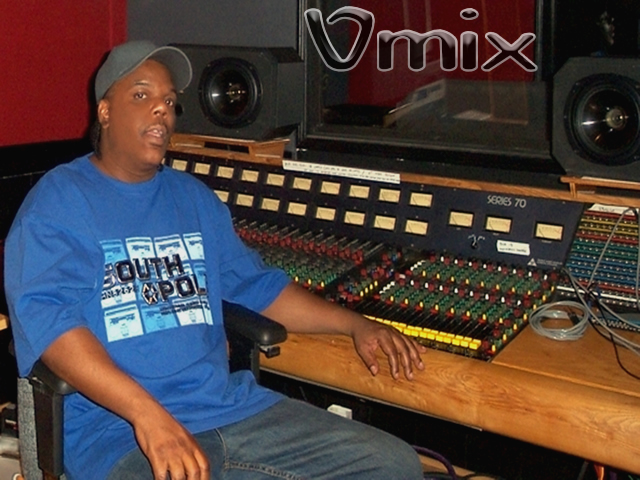
- at DJ U-Neek's Green Giant Studios 2008

Background information
- Born: Virgil Lee Davis Jr; September 18, 1960 (age 65); United States,
- Genres: Soul rock & roll; neo soul funk jazz reggae; hip hop
- Occupations: Recording engineer, singer-songwriter, record producer
- Instruments: Singing, guitars, drums, trombone, baritone horn, keyboards
- Years active: 1997–present

Virgil L. Davis Jr. (born September 18, 1960) is an American record producer / songwriter / musician based in Los Angeles. He recorded albums with DJ U-Neek for Bone Thugs-N-Harmony, earning a Grammy Award for his musician work on the group's hit song, "Tha Crossroads", also the 4× platinum album "The Art Of War", the multi platinum album "BTNHResurrection","Thug World Order" and "Thug Stories", "Strength & Loyalty", and "Uni5: The World's Enemy" and "The Art of War: World War III". He also was a writer / produced and performed on DJ U-Neek's solo album, "Ghetto Street Pharmacist".

He was also signed as a songwriter for Kingpin Records founder DJ U-Neek, where he wrote songs for Arista Records recording artist Angie Stone "Black Diamond" album along with other Kingpin Records artist. He later went on to record with Capitol Records recording artist "Tracie Spencer".
