= Paradise (Billy Lawrence album) =

Studio album by Billy Lawrence
- Released: June 24, 1997
- Genre: R&B, hip hop soul
- Length: 51:10
- Label: EastWest
- Producer: Merlin Bobb (exec.), Billy Lawrence (exec.), Poke & Tone (exec.), Darrell "Delite" Allamby, Dave Atkinson, Organized Noize, Rashad Smith

Billy Lawrence chronology
| One Might Say (1994) | Paradise (1997) | Too Many Times (1999) |

Singles from Paradise
- 1. "Come On" Released: March 25, 1997

Paradise is the second studio album from American R&B artist Billy Lawrence, released June 24, 1997 on East West Records. The album features an appearance from rapper MC Lyte on the first single "Come On", which previously appeared in the soundtrack to the film Set It Off the year before. Also appearing on the album was the then-unknown Van Hunt who played the Wurlitzer on the album's title track. Paradise also marked the debut of the controversial rap group dead prez who were credited as sticman & M-1 on the song "Footsteps".

== Release and reception ==
Professional ratings
Review scores
| Source | Rating |
|---|---|
| Allmusic | 4/5 stars |

The album reached the fifty-seventh spot on the R&B Albums chart.

== Track listing ==
| No. | Title | Writer(s) | Length |
|---|---|---|---|
| 1. | "Intro" | Allamby | 0:50 |
| 2. | "Come On" | Allamby, Lawrence | 4:08 |
| 3. | "Hooked on You" | Allamby, Atkinson, Barnes, Lawrence, Olivier | 3:47 |
| 4. | "Paradise" | Etheridge, Lawrence, Organized Noize | 4:27 |
| 5. | "Crazy Love" | Allamby, Barnes, Lawrence, Olivier | 4:10 |
| 6. | "Whirlpool of Love" | Allamby, Atkinson, Barnes, Lawrence, Olivier | 3:58 |
| 7. | "So into You" | Allamby, Barnes, Lawrence, Olivier, Riley | 4:08 |
| 8. | "Heaven" | Allamby | 4:22 |
| 9. | "Tell Me Why" | Allamby, Barnes, Lawrence, Olivier | 3:40 |
| 10. | "Give It to Me" | Allamby, Lawrence | 4:35 |
| 11. | "Chances Are" | Allamby, Chambers, Lawrence | 4:18 |
| 12. | "Footsteps Poem" | Allamby, Lawrence, Smith | 2:00 |
| 13. | "Footsteps" | Alford, Allamby, Gavin, Lawrence, Smith | 6:47 |
| 14. | "Up & Down (cassette bonus track)" | Greene, Lawrence | 4:04 |

== Chart history ==
=== Album ===
| Chart (1997) | Peak position |
|---|---|
| U.S. R&B Albums | 57 |

=== Singles ===
| Year | Single | Peak chart positions | | | |
| Year | Single | U.S. Billboard Hot 100 | U.S. Hot Dance Music/Maxi-Singles Sales | U.S. Hot R&B/Hip-Hop Singles & Tracks | U.S. Rhythmic Top 40 |
|---|---|---|---|---|---|
| 1997 | "Come On" | 44 | 18 | 19 | 14 |

== Personnel ==
Information taken from Allmusic.

- art direction – Kiku
- assistant engineering – Rawle Gittens, Storm Jefferson, Kenny Stallworth, Mike Wilson
- assistant mixing – Ricco Lumpkins
- bass – Preston Crump
- design – Kiku
- drum programming – Organized Noize, Poke & Tone, Rashad Smith
- engineering – Darrell "Delite" Allamby, Blake Eiseman, Brian Miller, Lou Ortiz, Chris Theis, Bernasky Wall, John Wydrycs
- executive production – Merlin Bobb, Billy Lawrence, Poke & Tone
- guitar – Tomi Martin
- keyboard programming – Darrell "Delite" Allamby
- keyboards – Darrell "Delite" Allamby, Dave Atkinson, Timothy Christian Riley
- mixing – Darrell "Delite" Allamby, Carl Nappa, Lou Ortiz, Neil Pogue, Richard Travali
- multi-instruments – Darrell "Delite" Allamby
- production – Darrell "Delite" Allamby, Dave Atkinson, Billy Lawrence, Organized Noize
- programming – Darrell "Delite" Allamby
- sampling – Rawle Gittens
- vocal production – Darrell "Delite" Allamby, Billy Lawrence
- wurlitzer – Van Hunt
