= Stoney Burke =

Stoney Burke may refer to:

- Stoney Burke (performer) (born 1963), American street performer
- Stoney Burke (TV series), a 1962–1963 American Western series
- Stoney Burke, an American record label that released the 1993 B.O.N.E. Enterpri$e album Faces of Death
