= Keep Your Eye on Me =

Studio album by Herb Alpert
- Released: February 13, 1987
- Recorded: 1986
- Genre: Jazz; R&B; Jazz pop
- Length: 43:53
- Label: A&M
- Producer: Herb Alpert; Jimmy Jam and Terry Lewis; Les Pierce; Roy Bittan; Shelly Yakus

Herb Alpert chronology
| Classics Volume 20 (1987) | Keep Your Eye on Me (1987) | Under a Spanish Moon (1988) |

Singles from Keep Your Eye on Me
- 1. "Diamonds" Released: March 14, 1987; 2. "Making Love in the Rain" Released: July 20, 1987

Professional ratings
Review scores
| Source | Rating |
|---|---|
| AllMusic | 3/5 stars |

Keep Your Eye on Me is a studio album by Herb Alpert, released on February 13, 1987. It contains two hit singles, "Diamonds" and "Making Love in the Rain" (both featuring lead and background vocals by Janet Jackson and Lisa Keith). These Billboard Top 40 hits, along with the title track and "Pillow" (featuring co-lead vocals by Alpert and singer/wife Lani Hall) were written and produced by Jimmy Jam and Terry Lewis. The remainder of the album consists of tracks produced by Herb Alpert and various producers. The record was constructed with side one (tracks 1–5) featuring uptempo songs, while side two (tracks 6–10) featured downtempo songs and ballads.

All trumpet solos were performed by Alpert.

The album was released on CD by A&M Records in 1987, along with extended CD singles of the title track and "Diamonds". It was re-released on September 12, 2013, in a download-only version available exclusively through Alpert's official website, HerbAlpertPresents.com.

== Track listing ==
1. "Keep Your Eye on Me" (Jimmy Jam, Terry Lewis) – 5:13
2. "Hot Shot" (Albert Hammond) – 3:56
3. "Diamonds" (Jam, Lewis) – 4:53
4. "Traffic Jam" (Les Pierce) – 3:16
5. "Cat Man Do" (Roy Bittan, Herb Alpert) – 5:26
6. "Pillow" (Jam, Lewis) – 4:32
7. "Our Song" (Alpert, Sal Macaluso) – 3:55
8. "Making Love in the Rain" (Jam, Lewis) – 5:56
9. "Rocket to the Moon" (John Barnes, Alpert) – 3:52
10. "Stranger on the Shore" (Mr. Acker Bilk, R. Mellin) – 2:54

== Personnel ==
- Herb Alpert – all trumpets (1, 2, 3, 5, 6, 9), horn arrangements (1, 3, 8), arrangements (2, 4, 5, 9, 10), trumpet (4, 8, 10), flugelhorn (4), lead vocals (6), vocal arrangements (6), muted trumpet (8), celeste (10)
- Jimmy Jam – keyboard and drum programming (1, 3, 6, 8), percussion (1, 3, 6, 8); horn, rhythm and vocal arrangements (1, 3, 6, 8)
- David Eiland – keyboard programming (1), sampling (1)
- Laythan Armor – keyboards (2), bass programming (2), drums (2), arrangements (2), synth voices and bass programming (7), electronic percussion (7)
- John Barnes – organ sound (2), DX7 tuba (5), keyboards (7, 9), drum programming (9), arrangements (9, 10), Fairlight voices (10), DX7 harmonica (10)
- Les Pierce – keyboard programming (4), drums (4), arrangements (4)
- Roy Bittan – keyboards (5), arrangements (5)
- Salvatore Macaluso – synth voices (7), synth bass (7)
- Michael Landau – guitars (2, 4, 5, 10), guitar solo (9), arrangements (10)
- Paul Jackson, Jr. – rhythm guitar (9)
- Terry Lewis – vocals (1); horn, rhythm and vocal arrangements (1, 3, 6, 8), bass (3), percussion (3, 6), backing vocals (3, 6, 8)
- Neil Stubenhaus – bass (5, 9)
- Chuck Domanico – acoustic bass (7)
- Jeff Porcaro – drums (5, 9)
- Steve Schaeffer – drums (10), percussion (10)
- Paulinho da Costa – percussion (2, 5, 9)
- Albert Hammond – arrangements (2)
- Michael Stokes – arrangements (2)
- Lisa Keith – vocals (1), vocal arrangements (1, 3, 8), lead vocals (3, 8), backing vocals (3, 6, 8)
- Janet Jackson – lead and backing vocals (3, 8)
- James "Popeye" Greer – party vocals (3)
- Jellybean Johnson – party vocals (3)
- Lani Hall – lead vocals (6), vocal arrangements (6)

=== Production ===
- John McClain – executive producer (1, 3, 6, 8)
- Jimmy Jam and Terry Lewis – producers (1, 3, 6, 8), assistant engineers (1, 3, 6, 8)
- Herb Alpert – producer (2, 4, 5, 7, 9, 10)
- Les Pierce – associate producer (4)
- Roy Bittan – producer (5)
- Shelly Yakus – remixing (4, 9, 10), producer (10)
- Steve Hodge – engineer (1, 3, 6, 8)
- Bill Bottrell – engineer (2)
- Robert de la Garza – engineer (2, 4, 5, 7, 9, 10)
- James "Popeye" Greer – assistant engineer (1, 3, 6, 8), studio manager
- Michael Bowman – assistant engineer (2)
- Ron Jacobs – assistant engineer (2), remix assistant (5, 7)
- John Pace – remixing (2, 5, 7), engineer (7)
- Paul McKenna – remixing (4)
- Mark McKenna – remix assistant (4, 9)
- Brian Gardner – mastering at Bernie Grundman Mastering (Hollywood, California)
- Susan Owens – production coordinator (1, 3, 6, 8)
- Chuck Beeson – art direction
- Melanie Nissen – art direction, design
- Chris Callis – photography

== Charts ==
Chart performance for Keep Your Eye on Me
| Chart (1987) | Peak position |
|---|---|
| US Billboard 200 | 18 |
| US Top R&B/Hip-Hop Albums (Billboard) | 5 |
