= Creepin on ah Come Up =

EP by Bone Thugs-n-Harmony
- Released: June 21, 1994
- Recorded: 1993–1994
- Studios: Dirtbiker Studios, Audio Achievements Studios, and Blackhole Recording Studio
- Genres: Hip hop; horrorcore; G-funk
- Length: 29:44
- Labels: Ruthless; Relativity
- Producers: Eazy-E; DJ Yella; DJ U-Neek; Rhythm D

Bone Thugs-n-Harmony chronology
Faces of Death (1993)	Creepin on ah Come Up (1994)	E. 1999 Eternal (1995)

Singles from Creepin' on ah Come Up
- 1. "Thuggish Ruggish Bone" Released: April 20, 1994; 2. "Foe tha Love of $" Released: February 7, 1995

Professional ratings
Review scores
Source	Rating
AllMusic	3/5 stars
Entertainment Weekly	B
RapReviews	9.5/10
The Rolling Stone Album Guide	4/5 stars

Creepin on ah Come Up is the debut EP by American hip hop group Bone Thugs-n-Harmony. The album was released on June 21, 1994, through Ruthless Records. In 1998, the album was selected as one of The Source's 100 Best Rap Albums.

== History ==
Bone Thugs-n-Harmony released their first album, Faces of Death (1993), under the name B.O.N.E. Enterpri$e. After the group was noticed by Eazy-E, he signed the group to Ruthless Records and suggested the name Thugs-N-Harmony after a song of the same name by the group, and they eventually agreed on the name Bone Thugs-n-Harmony.

== Music and lyrics ==
Bone Thugs-n-Harmony's first extended play includes the singles "Thuggish Ruggish Bone" and "Foe tha Love of $". Features on the album include vocalist Shatasha Williams and their mentor and executive producer Eazy-E. This EP is also notable for being the only project Bone Thugs-n-Harmony would release during Eazy-E’s lifetime. The first two lines of "Intro" are backwards. Played forward are "Heaven in art which Father our, Our Father which art in Heaven" Tracks 3, 4 and 6 have listed, "Keenu Songs" which is "U-Neek" spelled backwards.

Parts of "Foe tha Love of $" (including Jewell's backing vocals) are recycled from the Yomo & Maulkie track "For the Love of Money", from their 1991 album Are U Xperienced?. The closing track on Creepin on ah Come Up, "Moe Cheese", is actually the same instrumental track from Are U Xperienced?, also titled "For the Love of Money".

== Track listing ==
Creepin on ah Come Up track listing
No.	Title	Writer(s)	Producer(s)	Length
1.	"Intro"	Anthony Henderson; Stanley Howse; Bryon McCane; Kenneth McCloud; Steven Howse; Tim Middleton; Charles Scruggs; Eric Wright	Eazy-E; DJ Yella	1:25
2.	"Mr. Ouija"	Henderson; Stanley Howse; Bryon McCane; McCloud; Howse; Charles Scruggs; Tim Middleton	DJ U-Neek	1:20
3.	"Thuggish Ruggish Bone"	Henderson; Howse; McCane; McCloud; Middleton; Scruggs; Howse	DJ U-Neek	4:41
4.	"No Surrender"	Wright	DJ U-Neek	3:36
5.	"Down foe My Thang"	Henderson; Howse; McCane; McCloud; Howse; Scruggs; Wright	Rhythm D	4:48
6.	"Creepin on ah Come Up"	Henderson; Stanley Howse; Bryon McCane; McCloud; Steven Howse; Charles Scruggs; Middleton	DJ U-Neek	4:50
7.	"Foe tha Love of $" (feat. Eazy-E & Jewell)	Henderson; Howse; McCane; McCloud; Howse; Scruggs; Wright; Carraby	DJ Yella	4:32
8.	"Moe Cheese"	Henderson; Howse; McCane; McCloud; Howse; Scruggs; Middleton	DJ Yella	4:32
Total length:				29:44

Sample credits

- "Thuggish Ruggish Bone" contains a sample of "Mama Used to Say" as performed by Junior
- "Foe tha Love of $" contains a sample of "For the Love of Money" as performed by Yomo & Maulkie

=== Appearances ===
- Krayzie Bone appears on 7 tracks.
- Layzie Bone appears on 7 tracks.
- Bizzy Bone appears on 7 tracks.
- Wish Bone appears on 3 tracks.
- Flesh-n-Bone appears on 3 tracks.

== Charts ==
=== Weekly charts ===
Chart performance for Creepin on ah Come Up
Chart (1994)	Peak position
New Zealand Albums (RMNZ)	29
US Billboard 200	12
US Top R&B/Hip-Hop Albums (Billboard)	2

=== Year-end charts ===
Year-end chart performance for Creepin on ah Come Up
Chart (1994)	Position
US Billboard 200	90
US Top R&B/Hip-Hop Albums (Billboard)	17
Chart (1995)	Position
US Billboard 200	59
US Top R&B/Hip-Hop Albums (Billboard)	29

== Certifications ==
Certifications for Creepin on ah Come Up
Region	Certification	Certified units/sales
United States (RIAA)	4× Platinum	4,000,000^{^}
^{^} Shipments figures based on certification alone.
