= Small Soldiers (soundtrack) =

1998 movie soundtrack

Small Soldiers (Music from the Motion Picture)

Soundtrack album by Various artists
- Released: July 7, 1998
- Recorded: 1997–1998
- Genres: Hip-hop; rock
- Length: 31:16
- Label: DreamWorks

Singles from Small Soldiers (Music from the Motion Picture)
- 1. "War" Released: 1998; 2. "Another One Bites The Dust (Small Soldiers Remix)" Released: 1998

Soundtrack
Review scores
Source	Rating
AllMusic	2.5/5 stars

Small Soldiers (Music from the Motion Picture) and (Original Motion Picture Score) are the soundtrack and score to the 1998 film Small Soldiers, directed by Joe Dante.

The soundtrack consists of classic rock songs remixed by contemporary hip-hop artists. The film score was composed and conducted by Jerry Goldsmith.

== Musical style and influences ==
For the film's soundtrack album, contemporary hip-hop artists remixed classic rock songs, occasionally introducing new rap verses. "War" was covered by Bone Thugs-N-Harmony in collaboration with rock musicians Henry Rollins, Tom Morello and Flea.

For the film score, Joe Dante reunited with composer and conductor Jerry Goldsmith, his frequent composer on films such as Gremlins and The 'Burbs. Goldsmith's score consciously incorporated satirical references to Goldsmith's past film scores, such as Patton, Total Recall and Explorers.

== Music from the Motion Picture ==
The soundtrack album was released on July 7, 1998 by DreamWorks SKG Records. The soundtrack was not much of a success, only entering the Billboard 200 at number 103.

1. "War" (Bone Thugs-N-Harmony, Henry Rollins, Tom Morello, Michael Flea and Tim Alexander)
2. "Another One Bites The Dust (Small Soldiers Remix)" (Queen featuring Wyclef Jean, Pras, Free and Canibus)
3. "The Stroke" (Billy Squier and Dallas Austin) (does not appear in the film and replaced by "Communication Breakdown" and "Wannabe")
4. "Love Is a Battlefield" (Pat Benatar, Queen Latifah and DJ Kay Gee)
5. "Rock and Roll (Part 2)" (Gary Glitter & Dutch)
6. "Love Removal Machine" (The Cult and Mickey Petralia)
7. "My City Was Gone" (The Pretenders, Kool Keith and Butcher Brothers)
8. "Surrender" (Cheap Trick and Rich Costey)
9. "Tom Sawyer" (Rush and DJ Z-Trip)
10. "War" (Edwin Starr)

=== Songs heard in the film but not on the soundtrack ===
- "Communication Breakdown" by Led Zeppelin
- "Wannabe" by Spice Girls

== Original Motion Picture Score ==
Small Soldiers

Film score by Jerry Goldsmith
- Released: July 28, 1998 (original); June 18, 2018 (deluxe)
- Recorded: 1998
- Genre: Soundtrack
- Length: 31:01 (original); 75:50 (deluxe)
- Label: Varèse Sarabande
- Producer: Jerry Goldsmith

Jerry Goldsmith chronology
U.S. Marshals (1998)	Small Soldiers (1998)	Star Trek: Insurrection (1998)

Score
Review scores
Source	Rating
AllMusic	4/5 stars
Filmtracks	link

The film score album was first released in 1998 through Varèse Sarabande with nine tracks of score at a running time just over thirty-one minutes. In 2018, Varèse released a limited "deluxe" edition of the soundtrack containing the entire score, as well as alternates and additional music.

1. Assembly Line (3:33)
2. Alan and Archer (2:58)
3. Roll Call (4:49)
4. Prepare for Assault (3:46)
5. Branded (2:15)
6. Special Design (2:33)
7. I'm Scared (2:01)
8. Trust Me (4:04)
9. Off to Gorgon (4:41)

Deluxe Edition
No.	Title	Length
1.	"Globotech"	0:58
2.	"He's Here / Chip Hazard / Just Toys"	1:00
3.	"The Assembly Line"	2:44
4.	"Alan's Town"	1:25
5.	"The Boxes / Off the Truck"	2:12
6.	"Gorgonite Scum / Almost Sold"	1:36
7.	"Roll Call"	4:52
8.	"Alan and Archer"	3:01
9.	"Destruction / Branded"	3:01
10.	"Prepare for Assault"	3:48
11.	"Special Design (Extended Version)"	2:38
12.	"Talk to Me / Not Found"	3:07
13.	"Team Gorgonite"	1:10
14.	"Phone Wires / Gorgon / Top of the Stairs"	1:12
15.	"Stand Down / Negative Target"	1:52
16.	"The New Army / Brain Chip"	1:14
17.	"Bombshelley (Franz Waxman)"	1:21
18.	"The Wind"	1:01
19.	"The Gwendys / Terms of Surrender"	1:50
20.	"The Trojan Box / Rocket Entry"	1:45
21.	"Gwendys Attack"	1:47
22.	"This is Fun"	1:26
23.	"Toast / Down the River / Lost Battle"	1:21
24.	"I'm Scared"	2:04
25.	"Negotiations"	1:10
26.	"Fire in the Hole"	3:45
27.	"Trust Me"	4:07
28.	"No Prisoners"	4:38
29.	"Chip Dies / Cleaning Up"	1:39
30.	"Off to Gorgon"	4:44
31.	"Globotech (Alternate)"	0:55
32.	"Almost Sold (Alternate)"	1:15
33.	"The New Army / Brain Chip (Alternates)"	1:51
34.	"Toast / Lost Battle (Alternates)"	1:03
35.	"Ride of the Valkyries (Richard Wagner)"	0:40
36.	"Also Sprach Zarathustra (Richard Strauss)"	1:30
