= If I Could Teach the World =

Single by Bone Thugs-n-Harmony

from the album The Art of War
- Released: September 30, 1997
- Recorded: 1997
- Genre: Hip hop; R&B
- Label: Ruthless
- Songwriter(s): Anthony Henderson, Steven Howse Bryon McCane, DJ U-Neek, Charles C. Scruggs
- Producer(s): DJ U-Neek

Bone Thugs-n-Harmony singles chronology
| "Look into My Eyes" (1997) | "If I Could Teach the World" (1997) | "War" (1998) |

"If I Could Teach the World" is a hip-hop single released in 1997 by American group Bone Thugs-n-Harmony. It appeared on their album The Art of War and reached number 27 on the U.S. Hot 100. The group also won an AMA for best hip-hop artist for this song.

== Music video ==
Bizzy Bone appears in the song but not the video, while Flesh-n-Bone appears in the video but not the song. The video shows the group in the Apocalypse and at war. The instrumental of the song Thug Luv is played at the beginning and end of the video.

== Charts ==
| Chart (1997) | Peak position |
|---|---|
| New Zealand (Recorded Music NZ) | 11 |
| US Billboard Hot 100 | 27 |
| US Hot Rap Songs (Billboard) | 3 |
| US Hot R&B/Hip-Hop Songs (Billboard) | 20 |
| US Rhythmic (Billboard) | 10 |

== Certifications ==
| Region | Certification | Certified units/sales |
|---|---|---|
| United States (RIAA) | Gold | 500,000^{^} |
^{^} Shipments figures based on certification alone.
