= Home (Bone Thugs-n-Harmony song) =

Single by Bone Thugs-n-Harmony featuring Phil Collins

from the album Thug World Order
- Released: June 3, 2003
- Recorded: August 2002
- Genre: Hip hop, alternative hip hop
- Length: 5:18 (Album Version); 4:00 (Single Version)
- Label: Ruthless
- Songwriters: Phil Collins, Anthony Henderson, Tim Middleton
- Producer: DJ U-Neek

Bone Thugs-n-Harmony singles chronology
"Money, Money" (2002)	"Home" (2003)	"Take the Lead (Wanna Ride)" (2006)

Phil Collins singles chronology
"The Least You Can Do"/"Wake Up Call" (2003)	"Home" (2003)	"Look Through My Eyes" (2003)

Music video
- "Bone Thugs N Harmony - Home (Official Video)" on YouTube

"Home" is a song by American hip-hop group Bone Thugs-n-Harmony released as the third single from their album Thug World Order. The song features samples from British singer Phil Collins' song "Take Me Home".

== Music video ==
The group flew to Geneva, Switzerland in order to feature Collins in the video. According to band members, "Collins was like, if y'all wanna do it, it's cool, y'all go ahead and do it, but if y'all wanna do a video, y'all gotta come here...to Switzerland" to shoot the video. The video carries a serious and reflective tone, with the Bone Thugs and Collins walking separately around the city, interpolating between quick flash scenes of the city streets, scenes of a drumming parade, and the members rapping (singing in Collins' case) either inside a train station or at one of several spots outside (mostly accompanied by at least one other member). Emphasizing the difference between Collins and the rappers, his motions are noticeably calmer and less vivid than Bone's. Bizzy Bone's verse was removed from the video version, as he had already been fired from the group.

== Reception ==
"Home" was less than well received in the United States mainstream; in addition to failing to chart on the Billboard Hot 100, Bone collaborating with Collins was ranked #9 on VH1's "Top 20 Least Hip-Hop Moments in History" special. However, the song gained more positive attention overseas, particularly in the United Kingdom, as it peaked at number 19 in the UK's Top 40 charts. Due to the latter, Bone Thugs-n-Harmony decided to name Phil Collins an honorary member under the moniker "Chrome Bone".

== Charts ==
=== Weekly charts ===
Chart (2003)	Peak position
Dutch Top 40	83
Europe (European Hot 100 Singles)	74
Irish Singles Chart	35
Italian Singles Chart	39
New Zealand Singles Chart	5
Swiss Singles Chart	85
UK Singles (OCC)	19
U.S. Billboard Hot R&B/Hip-Hop Singles & Tracks	93

=== Year-end charts ===
Chart (2003)	Position
New Zealand (Recorded Music NZ)	46
