= War (Bone Thugs-n-Harmony song) =

Single by Bone Thugs-n-Harmony

from the album Small Soldiers (Music from the Motion Picture)
- Released: 1998
- Recorded: 1998
- Label: Ruthless

Bone Thugs-n-Harmony singles chronology
"If I Could Teach the World" (1997)	"War" (1998)	"Resurrection (Paper, Paper)" (2000)

"War" is a single by Bone Thugs-n-Harmony, released in 1998. It was featured on Small Soldiers and on the 1998 collection album The Collection Volume One. The song is performed by members Layzie, Flesh, and Wish, and also features Henry Rollins, Tom Morello and Flea with also Tim Alexander of Primus provides drums of the song.

The song interpolates the chorus of Edwin Starr's 1970 recording of The Temptations' song of the same name.
