= Thug World Order =

Studio album by Bone Thugs-n-Harmony
- Released: October 29, 2002
- Recorded: 2001–2002
- Genres: Hip hop; gangsta rap; hardcore hip-hop; R&B
- Length: 1:05:14
- Labels: Ruthless; Epic
- Producers: DJ U-Neek; Rico Wade; Krayzie Bone; Armando Colon; The Platinum Brothers; Bosko; Alvin "Stone" Clark; Def Jef, Self; L. T. Hutton

Bone Thugs-n-Harmony chronology
The Collection: Volume Two (2000)	Thug World Order (2002)	Greatest Hits (2004)

Singles from Thug World Order
- 1. "Money, Money" Released: September 6, 2002; 2. "Get Up & Get It" Released: February 14, 2003; 3. "Home" Released: June 3, 2003

Thug World Order is the fifth studio album by American hip hop group Bone Thugs-n-Harmony, released on October 29, 2002, and the group's final album for Ruthless Records. Singles released were "Money, Money", "Get Up & Get It" (featuring 3LW), and "Home" featuring Phil Collins, which charted in the UK.

Flesh-n-Bone did not appear on the album due to his incarceration on weapons charges though he does appear on the closing skit with DJ U-Neek, while Bizzy Bone was ejected from the group after the album's release.

Professional ratings
Review scores
Source	Rating
Allmusic	2.5/5 stars
Blender	3/5 stars
Entertainment Weekly	B
RapReviews	(7/10)
The Rolling Stone Album Guide	3.5/5 stars
Uncut	3/5 stars
USA Today	3.5/4 stars
Vibe	3.5/5 stars
XXL	4/5 stars

== Critical reception ==
Like their previous effort BTNHResurrection, Thug World Order received more favorable to positive reviews from music critics. William Ruhlmann of Allmusic gave the album two and a half stars out of a possible five, stating "Bone Thugs-N-Harmony are a good example of a group that has become little more than a brand name as its various members devote more of their time to solo projects. Thug World Order is only their fourth proper album in seven years, although many solo albums and recordings by other configurations have emerged during the period. By now, however, every album by the group seems like a reunion effort, their last one being dubbed BTNHResurrection, while, on this album, one of the members mutters unconvincingly, "I ain't gonna say we back, 'cause we never left...." The group's musical approach hasn't changed much, its raps offset by vocal harmonies and its musical beds anchored by samples as surprising as Phil Collins' "Take Me Home." Lyrically, their concerns are also much the same, extending from boasting and reflections on life in the 'hood to complaints about low-quality drugs ("Bad Weed Blues") and the duplicitousness of women with whom they have had sex ("Not My Baby"). But their attention seems distracted, especially when they interrupt the proceedings with commercials for their upcoming solo projects, and the album's disappointing initial commercial reception suggested that their audience wasn't paying close attention, either." Jon Caramanica gave the album a positive "B" rating stating "”How many thugs get down like us and still harmonize like the great Temptations?” the Cleveland foursome wonder on ”Guess Who’s Back.” Bone Thugs-N-Harmony have crooned lazy, tuneful hip-hop for a decade, and their fifth CD continues the psychedelia apace. They are the rare rappers who can sample Phil Collins, drop a Jeffrey Osborne riff, and praise God without seeming a bit less hard." Rolling Stone rated the album three and a half stars out of five.

== Track listing ==
Credits adapted from the album's liner notes.

No.	Title	Writer(s)	Producer(s)	Length
1.	"T.W.O. Intro" (featuring LaReece)	Steven Howse; Anthony Henderson; Bryon McCane; Charles Scruggs; Tim Middleton; Bert Keyes; Sylvia Robinson	DJ U-Neek; Bone Thugs-n-Harmony	1:18
2.	"Bone, Bone, Bone"	Howse; Henderson; McCane; Scruggs; Middleton; Jerry Goodman	DJ U-Neek; Bone Thugs-n-Harmony	3:45
3.	"Guess Who's Back?" (featuring LaReece)	Howse; Henderson; McCane; Scruggs; Rico Wade; Ray Murray; Patrick Brown; Bob Feldman; Gerald Goldstein; Richard Gottehrer; Kingsley Ward	Rico Wade	3:45
4.	"Home"	Phil Collins; Henderson; Middleton	Krayzie Bone; DJ U-Neek	5:18
5.	"What About Us?"	Howse; Henderson; McCane; Scruggs; Armando Colon	Armando Colon	5:24
6.	"Get Up & Get It" (featuring 3LW and Felecia)	Howse; Henderson; McCane; Scruggs; Mike Chesser; Adam Gibbs; Felecia Lindsey; Ward; Stephen Shockley	The Platinum Brothers; Bone Thugs-n-Harmony (co.)	4:00
7.	"Bad Weed Blues"	Howse; Henderson; McCane; Scruggs; Bosko	Bosko	5:16
8.	"All the Way"	Howse; Henderson; McCane; Scruggs; Middleton	DJ U-Neek; Bone Thugs-n-Harmony	4:21
9.	"Non-Fiction Words by Eazy-E" (Skit)		DJ U-Neek	0:21
10.	"Pump, Pump"	Howse; Henderson; McCane; Scruggs; Alvin Clark	Alvin "Stone" Clark; Bone Thugs-n-Harmony	4:50
11.	"Set It Straight" (featuring Felecia)	Howse; Henderson; McCane; Scruggs; Jeff Fortson	Def Jef; Soul G (add.)	4:28
12.	"Money, Money"	Howse; Henderson; McCane; Scruggs; Edward Hinson; Dutch Robinson	Self; Bone Thugs-n-Harmony	5:26
13.	"Not My Baby"	Howse; Henderson; McCane; Scruggs; Middleton; Timmy Gatling; Gene Griffin; Aaron Hall III; Teddy Riley	DJ U-Neek; Bone Thugs-n-Harmony	4:30
14.	"Cleveland Is the City" (featuring Avant)	Howse; Henderson; McCane; Scruggs; L.T. Hutton; Ian Hunter	L.T. Hutton	5:00
15.	"If I Fall"	Howse; Henderson; McCane; Scruggs; Middleton	DJ U-Neek; Bone Thugs-n-Harmony	5:14
16.	"A Thug Soldier Conversation"	Flesh-n-Bone	DJ U-Neek	2:15

Sample credits

- "T.W.O. Intro" contains an interpolation of "Love on a Two-Way Street", written by Bert Keyes and Sylvia Robinson.
- "Guess Who's Back?" contains an interpolation of "My Boyfriend's Back", written by Bob Feldman, Gerald Goldstein, and Richard Gottehrer.
- "Home" contains a sample of "Take Me Home", written and performed by Phil Collins.
- "Get Up & Get It" contains a sample of "Offer I Can't Refuse", written by Stephen Shockley, as performed by Klymaxx.
- "Money, Money" contains a sample of "I Ain't Got Nothin'", written and performed by Dutch Robinson.
- "Not My Baby" contains an interpolation of "You Can Call Me Crazy", written by Timmy Gatling, Gene Griffin, Aaron Hall III, and Teddy Riley, as performed by Guy.
- "Cleveland Is the City" contains an interpolation of "Cleveland Rocks", written by Ian Hunter.

== Charts ==
Chart (2002)	Peak position
U.S. Billboard 200	12
U.S. Billboard Top R&B/Hip Hop Albums	3
