= Making Love in the Rain =

Single by Herb Alpert with vocals by Lisa Keith and Janet Jackson

from the album Keep Your Eye on Me
- B-side: "Rocket to the Moon"; "Keep Your Eye on Me"
- Released: July 20, 1987
- Recorded: 1986
- Genre: Pop; smooth jazz; quiet storm; R&B
- Length: 3:58 (single version); 5:53 (album version)
- Label: A&M
- Songwriters: James Harris; Terry Lewis
- Producers: Jimmy Jam and Terry Lewis

Herb Alpert singles chronology
"Diamonds" (1986)	"Making Love in the Rain" (1987)	"3 O'clock Jump" (1989)

Janet Jackson singles chronology
"The Pleasure Principle" (1987)	"Making Love in the Rain" (1987)	"Funny How Time Flies (When You're Having Fun)" (1987)

Lisa Keith singles chronology
"Keep Your Eye on Me" (1987)	"Making Love in the Rain" (1987)	"Better Than You" (1993)

"Making Love in the Rain" is the third single by Herb Alpert from his Keep Your Eye on Me album. It features lead vocals by Lisa Keith with back-up vocals by Janet Jackson. It also features the rare occurrence of Alpert playing a muted trumpet, since he normally plays without one.

Jackson included the song during the DJ interlude on the second leg of her 2018 State of the World Tour.

== Charts ==
"Making Love in the Rain" reached number seven on the U.S. R&B singles chart, number 21 on the adult contemporary chart, and number 35 on the Billboard Hot 100.

Chart (1987)	Peak position
US Billboard Hot 100	35
US Hot R&B/Hip-Hop Songs (Billboard)	7
US Adult Contemporary (Billboard)	21

== Official versions/remixes ==
- Album version – 5:53
- Instrumental – 5:49
- 12" mix – 5:50
- 7" edit – 3:58

== Track listings ==
Canada/Japan/US/West Germany 7" single

1. "Making Love in the Rain" (Edit)
2. "Rocket to the Moon"

UK 7"

1. "Making Love in the Rain" (Edit)
2. "Making Love in the Rain" (Instrumental)

UK/West Germany 12"

1. "Making Love in the Rain" (12" Mix)
2. "Making Love in the Rain" (Instrumental)
3. "The Herb Alpert CD Megamix"

US 12"

1. "Making Love in the Rain" (12" Mix)
2. "Diamonds" (Cool Summer Mix)
3. "Keep Your Eye on Me" (Extended Mix)

== Samples ==
- Queen Latifah: "Just Another Day" from the album Black Reign
- Bone Thugs-n-Harmony: "Days of Our Livez" from the album Singles
- Styles P: "Ghost P" from the mixtape Ghost in the Machine
- Stalley: "She Hates The Bass" from the mixtape Lincoln Way Heights
- H.E.R.: "Damage"
- Truth Inc.: "Bring Back The Days"
