= Ghetto Street Pharmacist =

- Thump Street Records reissue cover

Studio album by DJ U-Neek
- Released: 1999
- Recorded: 1999
- Studio: U-Neek's Workshop (North Hollywood, CA)
- Genre: Hip-hop
- Length: 1:12:22
- Label: Kingpin
- Producer: DJ U-Neek

Professional ratings
Review scores
Source	Rating
AllMusic	3/5 stars

Ghetto Street Pharmacist is the debut studio album by American hip-hop music producer DJ U-Neek. It was released in 1999 through Kingpin Records and re-released later the same year via Thump Street Records. Recording sessions took place at U'Neek's Workshop in North Hollywood. Production was handled by DJ U-Neek himself.

It features guest appearances from The KingPin Family (Don Jagwarr, E.W.F., Gemini, L-Jay and Nyt Owl), Big Bone, Big Chan, Big Lurch, Cold 187um, Dekumpozed, Dresta, Jaz, Krayzie Bone, Layzie Bone, Lei Callaway, Lethal, Menenski, Sneek, Squeak Ru, Tamera Reed, Topp Notch and Virgil L. Davis Jr.

The album peaked at number 63 on the Top R&B/Hip-Hop Albums chart in the United States.

== Critical reception ==
AllMusic's Stephen Thomas Erlewine wrote that "like many albums by producers, it showcases style over content, trying a few too many things at once".

== Track listing ==
Thump Street Records (206 579 998 2) reissue track listing
No.	Title	Writer(s)	Length
1.	"Ghetto Street Pharmacist" (Intro)	Tim Middleton; Premro Smith; Rodney Ellis; Tristan Jones; Percy Miller; Vyshon Miller; Daryl Anderson	3:05
2.	"On the Run" (featuring Dresta and Cold 187um)	Middleton; Andre Wicker; Gregory Hutchison	2:45
3.	"We Come to Serve 'Em (Remix)" (featuring Krayzie Bone and The KingPin Family)	Middleton; Anthony Henderson; Jay Johnson; Ernest Gillet; Nyt Owl; Larry Johnson; Duane Earle; William Collins; George Clinton	4:34
4.	"Murda Murda" (featuring Layzie Bone, Lethal and L-Jay)	Middleton; Steven Howse; Kareem Brown; Johnson	4:10
5.	"Bring It On" (featuring Don Jagwarr)	Middleton; Earle	3:03
6.	"Now That I'm Over You" (featuring Gemini)	Middleton; Virgil L. Davis Jr.; Ramsey Lewis	3:40
7.	"Ain't No Love" (featuring Big Chan, Squeak Ru and Sheeba Black)	Middleton; Chan Gaines; Marcus Moore; Shanelle Denae Graham	4:13
8.	"I Want Cha' Lovin'" (featuring Lei Callaway, Topp Notch and E.W.F.)	Middleton; Davis Jr.; Bryon McCane; Charles Scruggs; Henderson; Eric Wright; Antoine Carraby; Yomo Smith; Mark Green; Stanley Howse; Howse	4:06
9.	"Blaze" (featuring E.W.F. and Sneek)	Middleton; Gillet; Johnson; Sydney Partridge; Clinton; Collins; Maceo Parker	4:42
10.	"Doctor Doctor" (featuring Gemini and Sy Smith)	Middleton; Angela Slates; Syretha Smith	4:06
11.	"On Deck" (featuring NytOwl)	Middleton; Nyt Owl	3:22
12.	"Hard" (featuring Virgil L. Davis Jr. and Tamera Reed)	Davis Jr.	1:47
13.	"What Must I Do" (featuring Jaz and NytOwl)	Middleton; Nyt Owl; Davis Jr.	3:36
14.	"We Come to Serve 'Em" (featuring The KingPin Family)	Middleton; J. Johnson; Gillet; Nyt Owl; L. Johnson; Earle	4:27
15.	"California Streets" (featuring L-Jay)	L. Johnson	3:56
16.	"Eastsider" (featuring Menenski)	Middleton; Antyone Redd	3:42
17.	"Woe Is I" (featuring Dekumpozed)	Barrett Strong; Norman Whitfield	4:40
18.	"The Real Ones" (featuring Big Bone and Big Lurch)	Middleton; Terrance Willaims; Antron Singleton	4:11
19.	"Doctor Doctor (Remix)" (featuring Gemini and Sy Smith)	Middleton; Slates; S. Smith	4:17
Total length:			1:12:22

Sample credits

- Track "Ghetto Street Pharmacist (intro)" contains samples form "Ghetto Cheeze" written by Percy Miller, Vyshon Miller and Daryl Anderson as recorded by Tru and "Down and Out" written by Premro Smith, Rodney Ellis and Tristan Jones as recorded by Eightball.
- Track "Now That I'm Over You" contains an interpolation of "Sun Goddess" written by Maurice White and Jon Lind.
- Track "Woe Is I" contains a sample from "I Can't Get Next to You" written by Barrett Strong and Norman Whitfield.
- Track "Blaze" contains an interpolation of "Ahh... The Name is Bootsy, Baby" written by George Clinton, William Collins and Maceo Parker.
- Track "What Must I Do" contains interpolations of "If It Ain't Ruff" written by Andre Young and Lorenzo Patterson and "What People Do for Money" written by Richard Dowling and Michael Dowling.
- Track "I Want Cha Lovin'" contains an interpolation of "Foe tha Love of $" written by Bryon McCane, Charles Scruggs, Anthony Henderson, Eric Wright, Antoine Carraby, Yomo Smith, Mark Green, Stanley Howse and Steven Howse.

== Personnel ==
- Tim "DJ U-Neek" Middleton – producer, executive producer
- Rhodri Davis – recording
- Virgil L. Davis Jr. – recording
- Aaron Connor – mixing
- Tom Baker – mastering
- Kris Solem – mastering
- Madeleine Smith – clearances
- Mark Spier – clearances
- Leonard L. Bey – photography

== Charts ==
Chart (1999)	Peak position
US Top R&B/Hip-Hop Albums (Billboard)	63
