= Diamonds (Herb Alpert song) =

Single by Herb Alpert featuring Janet Jackson and Lisa Keith

from the album Keep Your Eye on Me
- B-side: "African Flame"; "Stranger on the Shore"
- Released: March 14, 1987
- Recorded: 1986
- Genre: R&B; dance-pop
- Length: 3:54 (Single Version) 4:53 (Album Version)
- Label: A&M
- Songwriters: James Harris III; Terry Lewis
- Producer: Jimmy Jam and Terry Lewis

Herb Alpert singles chronology
"Keep Your Eye on Me" (1986)	"Diamonds" (1987)	"Making Love in the Rain" (1987)

Janet Jackson singles chronology
"Let's Wait Awhile" (1987)	"Diamonds" (1987)	"The Pleasure Principle" (1987)

"Diamonds" is a song by American trumpeter Herb Alpert from his 27th studio album, Keep Your Eye on Me (1987). Released as the second single from Keep Your Eye on Me on March 14, 1987, by A&M Records, the song features lead and background vocals by American singers Janet Jackson and Lisa Keith.

== Song information ==
This single marked a comeback for Herb Alpert. Four tracks on the song's album, Keep Your Eye on Me, were produced by Jimmy Jam and Terry Lewis, who melded Alpert's sound with their own Minneapolis funk.

== Music video ==
In the music video, Herb Alpert appears in "Bucky's" nightclub, where the DJ plays his new single. The song is a hit with the crowd, and Alpert and his band perform on stage. Meanwhile, Janet Jackson heads back to the club in a limo, though Jackson herself does not appear in the video; a look-alike is used for the limo scenes and the silhouette of Jackson in the club. A child breaks through the look-alike's silhouette and performs as Jackson.

== Live performance ==
Janet Jackson included the song on her 2011 tour Number Ones: Up Close and Personal and as a DJ interlude on the 2015–2016 Unbreakable World Tour. It was also included on the 2023-2024 Together Again Tour.

== Chart performance ==
"Diamonds" was a hit in the U.S., peaking at #5 on the Billboard Hot 100, and at #1 on the Hot R&B/Hip-Hop Singles & Tracks. The single also went to #1 on the Hot Dance Music/Club Play and Hot Dance Music/Maxi-Singles Sales charts in the U.S. "Diamonds" was a hit in countries such as Canada and the Netherlands, but a more modest chart success in the UK and Australia. Its successor, "Making Love in the Rain", would reach #35 on the Hot 100 in September 1987.

=== Weekly charts ===
Weekly chart performance for "Diamonds"
Chart (1987)	Peak position
Australia (Kent Music Report)	47
Belgium (Ultratop 50 Flanders)	4
Canadian Singles Chart	4
Europe (European Hot 100 Singles)	12
Germany (GfK)	15
Ireland (IRMA)	28
Netherlands (Dutch Top 40)	4
Netherlands (Single Top 100)	3
New Zealand (Recorded Music NZ)	31
South Africa (RISA)	8
Switzerland (Schweizer Hitparade)	23
UK Singles (OCC)	27
US Billboard Hot 100	5
US Dance Club Songs (Billboard)	1
US Hot R&B/Hip-Hop Songs (Billboard)	1

=== Year-end charts ===
1987 year-end chart performance for "Diamonds"
Chart (1987)	Rank
Belgium (Ultratop 50 Flanders)	38
Canada Top Singles (RPM)	78
Netherlands (Dutch Top 40)	38
Netherlands (Single Top 100)	37
US Top Pop Singles (Billboard)	79
US Crossover Singles (Billboard)	11

== Track listing ==
- Japan 5" CD single
1. "Diamonds" (Cool Summer Mix) – 6:19
2. "Diamonds" (Cool Summer Dance Mix) – 5:55
3. "Diamonds" (Cool Summer Instrumental) – 5:27
4. "Diamonds" (Cool Summer Dub Version) – 4:23
5. "Diamonds" (Cool Summer 7" Edit) – 3:54
6. "Diamonds" (dance mix) – 6:48
7. "Diamonds" (instrumental) – 5:14
8. "Diamonds" (Beats Dubcapella) – 3:12
- UK 7" vinyl single
1. "Diamonds" (edit) – 3:58
2. "Rocket to the Moon" – 3:52
- UK Cassette single
1. "Diamonds" (dance mix)
2. "Diamonds" (edit)
3. "Diamonds" (instrumental)
4. "Rocket to the Moon"
- US 7" vinyl single
1. "Diamonds" – 4:53
2. "African Flame" – 3:58
- US 12" maxi single mix vinyl SP-12231
1. "Diamonds" (dance mix) – 6:45
2. "Diamonds" (instrumental) – 5:10
3. "Diamonds" (Beats Dubcapella) – 3:10
- US 12" maxi single mix vinyl promotional copy - non for sale SP-17475
1. "Diamonds" (Cool Summer Mix) – 6:16
2. "Diamonds" (Cool Summer Dance Mix) – 5:51
3. "Diamonds" (instrumental) - 5:23
4. "Diamonds" (Dub Version) – 4:20
5. "Diamonds" (7" Edit) – 3:50
- Japan 7" vinyl single
1. "Diamonds" – 4:53
2. "Stranger on the Shore" – 2:54
