= Come On (Billy Lawrence song) =

R&B single by Billy Lawrence featuring MC Lyte

Single by Billy Lawrence featuring MC Lyte

from the album Paradise and Set It Off: Music From the New Line Cinema Motion Picture
- Released: March 25, 1997
- Genre: R&B, hip hop soul
- Length: 4:08
- Label: EastWest
- Songwriter(s): Billy Lawrence; Darrell "Delite" Allamby
- Producer(s): Darrell "Delite" Allamby

Billy Lawrence featuring MC Lyte singles chronology
"Boyfriend" (1994)	"Come On" (1997)	"Take It to the Streets" (1997)

"Come On" is a song by American R&B recording artist Billy Lawrence featuring MC Lyte. It was released in March 1997 as the lead single from Lawrence's second album Paradise, and was also included on the Set It Off soundtrack. "Come On" reached number 14 on the US Billboard Rhythmic Top 40 chart, number 18 on the Hot Dance Music/Maxi-Singles Sales chart, number 19 on the Hot R&B/Hip-Hop Singles & Tracks chart, and number 44 on the Hot 100.

== Formats and track listings ==
CD single

1. "Come On" (Album Version) – 4:09
2. "Come On" (Remix) – 4:09
3. "Come On" (Alternative Album Mix) – 4:09
4. "When Alone" – 4:34
5. "Come On" (Radio Version W/O Rap) – 3:58

12" maxi

1. "Come On" (Album Version) – 4:09
2. "Come On" (Remix) – 4:09
3. "Come On" (Alternative Album Mix) – 4:09
4. "Come On" (Radio Version W/O Rap) – 3:58

CD maxi

1. "Come On" (Album Version) – 4:09
2. "Come On" (Remix Clean) – 4:09
3. "Come On" (Alternative Album Mix) – 4:09
4. "Hoked On You" – 4:34
5. "Come On" (Radio Version W/O Rap) – 3:58

CD maxi - Remixes

1. "Come On" (Radio Version) – 4:09
2. "Come On" (Radio Version W/O Rap) – 4:09
3. "Come On" (Alternative Album Version) – 4:09
4. "Come On" (Remix) – 3:58
5. "Come On" (Remix W/O Rap) – 3:58

== Charts ==
Chart (1997)	Peak Position
U.S. Billboard Hot 100	44
U.S. Hot Dance Music/Maxi-Singles Sales	18
U.S. Hot R&B/Hip-Hop Singles & Tracks	19
U.S. Rhythmic Top 40	14
