= Faces of Death (album) =

Studio album by B.O.N.E Enterpri$e
- Released: May 28, 1993
- Genre: Horrorcore
- Length: 35:44
- Label: Stoney Burke
- Producer: Diego Blak; Kris Ford; Ralph Rock; Bobby Jones

B.O.N.E Enterpri$e chronology
Faces of Death (1993)	Creepin on ah Come Up (1994)

Alternative covers
- Digitally Remastered Cover

Professional ratings
Review scores
Source	Rating
Allmusic	1.5/5 stars

Faces of Death is the debut album by the American hip-hop group B.O.N.E. Enterpri$e (later known as Bone Thugs-n-Harmony). The album was released on May 28, 1993, on Stoney Burke, the independent label of Kermit Henderson, a record store owner in Cleveland who helped the band to record the album. A verse from the first 1991 local radio single, titled "Flow Motion", was performed over the phone by member, Krayzie Bone, leading to four of the five members meeting up with Eazy-E and getting them signed to Ruthless Records. A digitally remastered version was released in 1995 after the band had signed with Eazy-E and changed their name to Bone Thugs-n-Harmony.

The album introduced the group's unique style of rapping in harmony, alternating singing and rapping, with layered harmonies of spoken rap.

== Track listing ==
No.	Title	Length
1.	"Flow Motion (Note: Flow Motion is clean on the Digitally Remastered version)"	2:44
2.	"Everyday Thang"	5:16
3.	"Intro"	1:32
4.	"Def Dick"	4:42
5.	"Sons of Assassins"	4:06
6.	"Hell Sent"	5:48
7.	"#1 Assassin"	3:31
8.	"We Be Fiendin'"	1:39
9.	"Bless da 40 Oz."	4:03
10.	"Ganksta Attitude"	4:26
