= DJ Rectangle =

American DJ (born 1970)

- DJ Rectangle performing live on turntables at a club event

Background information
- Born: Scott Kluesner; July 13, 1970 (age 55)
- Genres: Dance; Hip hop; Club; Latin
- Occupations: DJ; Producer; Recording artist
- Years active: 1991–present
- Label: Fortress of Vinyl Records

Scott Kluesner (born July 13, 1970), also known as DJ Rectangle, is an American disc jockey, turntablist, and record producer. Once based in Los Angeles, California, he now lives in Las Vegas, Nevada.

== Education and early career ==
Kluesner attended San Diego State University and graduated with a Bachelor of Business Administration.^{[citation needed]}

In 1993, DJ Rectangle won the U.S. DMC Championship and the International DJ Search, after which he became the official DJ for rapper Warren G's tour Regulate.

== Career ==
Kluesner has worked as a producer with artists including Eminem, Snoop Dogg, 50 Cent, Justin Timberlake, Dirt Nasty, Mala Rodríguez, Jurassic 5, and Xzibit. He has participated in tours with performers such as R. Kelly, Heavy D, Montell Jordan, Monica, Bone Thugs-n-Harmony, and Ice Cube. In addition, he has performed with Snoop Dogg, Nate Dogg, The Lady of Rage, Foxy Brown, Tha Dogg Pound, The Luniz, and Ron Isley, among others.

Since the early 1990s, Kluesner has released numerous mixtapes and battle records.

Kluesner’s production work was featured on Malamarismo, the third studio album of Mala Rodríguez, which received a Latin Grammy nomination for Best Urban Music Album in 2007.

In 2023, Kluesner released a 68-track mixtape titled Fader Invasion 2.

== Discography ==
=== Mixtapes ===
- 1992 – Vanilla Dope, EP
- 1994 – Rollin' Deep, O.G Style, Talkin Shit, Let the Bass Kick, Funky Demolition
- 1995 – Vinyl Combat, Ill Rated
- 1997 – The Tables Have Turned, Deadly Needles bay
- 1998 – The Lightning Fist (Millennium Collection Vol. 7)
- 1999 – Behind Bars, Wax Assassin.
- 2000 – Enter the Diamond Needle Dynasty.
- 2002 – Faders of Fury, Vinyl Combat 2: Attack of the Clones, Turntable Torture, Deadly Needles.
- 2003 – 1200's Never Die.
- 2004 – Who Framed DJ Rectangle?, "Resident Evil" Turn Table Apocalypse, Six Million Dollar Hand, Wax On Wax Off, Tonearm Terrorwrist
- 2005 – Fear and Loathing, Rectangle's Big Adventure, 2005 Pyro Technics
- 2006 – Casino Royale Vol. 1: For the Hustlers, Casino Royale Vol. 2: For the Gangsters, Kill Steelz Vol. 1, Kill Steelz Vol. 2
- 2008 – Wax Assassin 2: Training Day, Bad Table Manners
- 2013 – When Worlds Collide, Vinyl Combat 3
- 2014 – Deadly Needles 2, Guardians of the Turntablist, Ultimate Power, Twelve Hundred Ways to Die
- 2015 – Ultimate Power Vol. 2, Ultimate Power Vol. 3, Fast & Faderless, Vinyl Combat 4
- 2016 – Forbidden Faders, Daredevil Technics
- 2017 – A Blazing Ape Vol. 1, Deadly Needles 3, 1200's Never Die Vol. 2, Ultimate Power Vol. 4, Legend Chapter 1, Kill Zone, Dragon's Flare
- 2018 – Vinyl Combat 5, Kill Steelz Vol. 3, Wax On Wax Off Vol. 2, Legend Chapter 2, Fader Invasion, Wrists of Fury, The Six Million Dollar Hand 2, The Wolf of Wax Street
- 2019 – Vinyl Warning, Vinyl Rambo, Vinyl Combat 6, Faders of Fury Vol. 2
- 2023 - Fader Invasion 2

=== Battle records ===
- 1991 – Dope Trax Vol. 1
- 1994 – Let the Bass Kick, Funky Demolition
- 1995 – Ultimate Battle Weapon Vol. 1, Ultimate Battle Weapon Vol. 2, Ultimate Battle Weapon Vol. 3
- 1996 – Ultimate Battle Weapon Vol. 4, Ultimate Battle Weapon Vol. 5, Original Battle Weapon
- 1997 – Deadly Needles, Gorilla Breaks, Frosted Breaks, Battle Wax Vol. 1
- 1998 – Ultimate Ultimate Battle Weapon Vol. 1, Frosted Breaks Vol. 2
- 1999 – Ultimate Ultimate Battle Weapon Vol. 2, Ultimate Ultimate Battle Weapon, Vol. 3, The Vinyl Avengers Vol. 1
- 2000 – Scratch Masters Revenge Vol. 1, Mixes Beats & More Vol. 1, Mixes Beats & More Vol. 2
- 2001 – The Best of DJ Rectangle, Ultimate Ultimate Battle Weapon Vol. 4 (Battle record), Ultimate Ultimate Battle Weapon Vol. 5
- 2002 – The Vinyl Avengers Vol. 2
- 2003 – Battle Wax Vol. 2
- 2005 – Dope Trax Vol. 2
- 2006 – Ultimate Ultimate Battle Weapon Vol. 6
- 2007 – Ultimate Ultimate Battle Weapon Vol. 7, Ultimate Ultimate Battle Weapon Vol. 8
- 2009 – Scratch Masters Revenge Vol. 2

=== Production ===
==== 1996 ====
===== Set It Off (soundtrack) – Da 5 Footaz =====
- "The Heist" (Def Jam Recordings)

===== Fakin' da Funk (soundtrack) – The Dove Shack =====
- "Low Low" (Street Solid)

==== 1997 ====
===== Ghetto Politix – DJ Rectangle =====
- "Turntable Terror" (Universal Music Group / Thump)

===== Troubleshooters – Funkdoobiest feat. Daz Dillinger =====
- "Papi Chulo" (RCA)

==== 1998 ====
===== The Big Hit (soundtrack) – Funkdoobiest =====
- "Act On It" (Universal Music Group)

===== Cheap Shots, Low Blows and Sucker Punches – The Whoridas =====
- "Get Lifted" (South Paw)

===== Cheap Shots, Low Blows and Sucker Punches – Son Doobie =====
- "Cali Life" (South Paw)

==== Pumping Energy 3 – DJ Rectangle ====
- "Various" (De Wolfe)

===== Hard Beats – DJ Rectangle =====
- "Various" (De Wolfe)

==== 2000 ====
===== Greatest Hits – A Lighter Shade of Brown =====
- "Street Life" (Universal Music Group)

===== Larger Than Life – Xzibit feat. Montage =====
- "Larger Than Life (TVT)

==== 2001 ====
===== Real Urban Latin 1 – Funkdoobiest =====
- "4-1 Nite" (RCA)

===== Hip Hop + Rap – DJ Rectangle =====
- "Ya Ya Door" (De Wolfe)
- "What What" (De Wolfe)
- "First Love" (De Wolfe)
- "How Many Times" (De Wolfe)
- "Best Watch Out" (De Wolfe)
- "Rock The Spot" (De Wolfe)
- "Fake a Smile" (De Wolfe)

===== The Ultimate – DJ Rectangle feat. The Whoridas =====
- "The Way We Do" (South Paw)

===== The Ultimate – DJ Rectangle Feat. Funkdoobiest =====
- "Wild Out" (South Paw)

==== 2003 ====
===== 1200's Never Die – DJ Rectangle feat. Eminem and Dree =====
- "You Must Be Crazy" (Music 4 Da People)

==== 2005 ====
===== Get Rich or Die Tryin' – DJ Rectangle feat. 50 Cent =====
- "Uncle Deuce's Rap" (Aftermath Entertainment)

==== 2007 ====
===== Dirt Nasty – Simon Rex =====
- "Animal Lover" (Shoot To Kill)

==== 2008 ====
===== Malamarismo – Mala Rodríguez =====
- "Malamarismo" (Universal Music Spain)
