= Money, Money =

Single by Bone Thugs-n-Harmony

from the album Thug World Order
- Released: September 6, 2002
- Recorded: 2001
- Genre: Hip hop
- Label: Ruthless
- Songwriters: Anthony Henderson, Edward Hinson, Steven Howse, Bryon McCane, Theodore Robinson, Charles Scruggs.
- Producer: DJ U-Neek

Bone Thugs-n-Harmony singles chronology
"Can't Give It Up" (2000)	"Money, Money" (2002)	"Get Up and Get It" (2002)

"Money, Money" is the first single from the album Thug World Order by the American hip-hop group Bone Thugs-n-Harmony, released in 2002. The song interpolates Dutch Robinson of the Ohio Players' track "I Ain't Got Nothin" from his album Nothin's Got Me.

It was the only video from the album to include Bizzy Bone, who left the group shortly after the release of the album. Some music channels would not play the video as they thought it promoted robbery.
