= Look into My Eyes (Bone Thugs-n-Harmony song) =

1997 single by Bone Thugs-n-Harmony

Single by Bone Thugs-n-Harmony

from the album Music from and Inspired by the "Batman & Robin" Motion Picture and The Art of War
- Released: June 3, 1997
- Recorded: 1996
- Studio: Studio Cat (Hollywood, California); U-Neeks Workshop (Los Angeles)
- Genre: Hip hop
- Length: 4:28
- Label: Ruthless; Relativity
- Songwriters: Anthony Henderson; Steven Howse; Bryon McCane; Charles Scruggs; Tim Middleton; Anthony Eugene Cowan
- Producer: DJ U-Neek

Bone Thugs-n-Harmony singles chronology
"Days of Our Livez" (1996)	"Look into My Eyes" (1997)	"If I Could Teach the World" (1997)

Music video
- "Look Into My Eyes" on YouTube

"Look into My Eyes" is a song performed by American hip hop group Bone Thugs-n-Harmony, written by members Krayzie Bone, Layzie Bone, Bizzy Bone and Wish Bone, Anthony Eugene Cowan, and producer Tim "DJ U-Neek" Middleton. It was released on June 3, 1997, via Ruthless and Relativity Records as the third single from Music from and Inspired by the "Batman & Robin" Motion Picture and lead single from Bone Thugs-n-Harmony's third studio album, The Art of War. Recording sessions took place at Studio Cat and at U-Neeks Workshop in Los Angeles.

In the United States, the single peaked at number four on both the Billboard Hot 100 and Hot R&B Singles charts. On November 24, 1997, it was certified platinum by the Recording Industry Association of America (RIAA) for sales of one million copies. The song made it to number three in New Zealand and number sixteen in the UK Singles Chart. A music video was released for the single. Bizzy Bone did not appear in it, but the clips from the film were scattered throughout the video. A remix also produced by DJ U-Neek entitled "Look into My Eyes (Atlantis Remix)" was released on the compilation album The Collection: Volume Two. The song is interpolated into the song "Watching Me" (with Rae Sremmurd and Kodak Black) from Creed II: The Album.

== Critical reception ==
Professional ratings
Review scores
Source	Rating
AllMusic	1.5/5 stars
Entertainment Weekly	C

Chuck Eddy of Entertainment Weekly wrote: "The staccato rap harmonies of these hugely popular Cleveland gangsta youngstas, Bone Thugs-N-Harmony, resulted in startling gospel beauty on earlier hits. "Look Into My Eyes", the first commercial single from the Batman & Robin soundtrack, aims for a hypnotic darkness but ultimately feels tired and trite: spiritless voices dragging themselves through formless tempo shifts over a beatless background blur". AllMusic critic gave the single 1.5 out of five stars.

== Charts ==
=== Weekly charts ===
Chart (1997)	Peak position
New Zealand (Recorded Music NZ)	3
UK Singles (OCC)	16
UK Hip Hop/R&B (OCC)	6
US Billboard Hot 100	4
US Hot R&B/Hip-Hop Songs (Billboard)	4
US Hot Rap Songs (Billboard)	2
US Rhythmic Airplay (Billboard)	4

=== Year-end charts ===
Chart (1997)	Position
New Zealand (RIANZ)	17
US Billboard Hot 100	47
US Hot R&B Singles (Billboard)	54
US Hot Rap Singles (Billboard)	14
US Rhythmic Top 40 (Billboard)	80

== Certifications ==
Region	Certification	Certified units/sales
United States (RIAA)	Platinum	1,000,000^{^}
^{^} Shipments figures based on certification alone.

== Release history ==
Region	Date	Format(s)	Label(s)	Ref.
United States	May 27, 1997	Rhythmic contemporary; contemporary hit radio	Ruthless; Relativity	
United States	June 3, 1997	12-inch vinyl; CD; cassette	Ruthless; Relativity	
United Kingdom	July 14, 1997	12-inch vinyl; CD; cassette	Ruthless; Epic	
