= Days of Our Livez =

Single by Bone Thugs-n-Harmony

from the album Set It Off: Music From the New Line Cinema Motion Picture and The Collection Volume One
- Released: September 24, 1996
- Length: 5:50
- Label: Ruthless
- Songwriters: Bone; D. J. U-Neek; Jimmy Jam; Terry Lewis
- Producer: D. J. U-Neek

Bone Thugs-n-Harmony singles chronology
"Tha Crossroads" (1996)	"Days of Our Livez" (1996)	"Look into My Eyes" (1997)

"Days of Our Livez" is a song by American hip-hop group Bone Thugs-n-Harmony. The instrumental is primarily based on samples of "Tender Love" by Force MDs and "Making Love in the Rain" by Herb Alpert. It was included on the soundtrack to the movie Set It Off and is played in the film. The song also appears on the group's 1998 compilation album, The Collection Volume One.

"Days of Our Livez" was not released as a commercial single in the United States, so it was not allowed to chart on the Billboard Hot 100 chart due to rules in place at the time. It instead charted on airplay, appearing on the Billboard Hot 100 Airplay, Hot R&B Airplay, and Top 40/Rhythm-Crossover charts. Worldwide, the song reached number five in New Zealand and number 37 in the United Kingdom.

== Charts ==
Chart (1996–1997)	Peak position
New Zealand (Recorded Music NZ)	5
Scottish Singles Sales (Official Charts)	82
UK Singles (Official Charts)	37
UK Dance (Official Charts)	36
UK Hip Hop/R&B (Official Charts)	7
US Radio Songs (Billboard)	39
US R&B/Hip-Hop Airplay (Billboard)	11
US Rhythmic Airplay (Billboard)	5

=== Year-end charts ===
Chart (1996)	Position
US Hot R&B Airplay (Billboard)	74
US Top 40/Rhythm-Crossover (Billboard)	40
