= Billy Lawrence =

American singer-songwriter

- Born: Boca Raton, Florida
- Origin: Saint Louis, Missouri, United States
- Genres: R&B, soul, hip-hop soul
- Occupations: Singer, songwriter,
- Years active: 1992–present

Billy Lawrence is an American R&B/soul singer-songwriter, record producer, and arranger.

== Discography ==
=== Albums ===
Year	Album	Label	Peak Position		
Year	Album	Label	Billboard Hot 200	Billboard Top R&B/Hip-Hop Albums	Billboard Top Heatseekers
August 16, 1994	One Might Say	EastWest			
June 24, 1997	Paradise	EastWest		57	
11/??/1999 (Unreleased)	Too Many Times	EastWest			

=== Singles ===
Year	Song	Peak Position		
Year	Song	Billboard Hot 100	Hot R&B/Hip-Hop	Bubbling Under Hot 100 Singles
1994	"Happiness"	87	61	One Might Say
1994	"Boyfriend"			One Might Say
1997	"Come On" (feat. MC Lyte)	44	19	Paradise
1997	"Up & Down"	92	47	Paradise
1997	"Paradise"			Paradise
2002	"Tell Me" (with Smilez and Southstar)	28	28	Crash the Party
2002	"Now That You're Gone" (with Smilez and Southstar)	—	—	Crash the Party
