= The Art of War (Bone Thugs-n-Harmony album) =

Studio album by Bone Thugs-n-Harmony
- Released: July 29, 1997
- Recorded: 1996–1997
- Studio: U-Neek's Workshop (Los Angeles, California)
- Genres: Hip hop; hardcore rap; gangsta rap; R&B
- Length: 121:14
- Labels: Ruthless; Relativity
- Producers: Tomica Wright (exec.); DJ U-Neek

Bone Thugs-n-Harmony chronology
E. 1999 Eternal (1995)	The Art of War (1997)	Collection Volume One & Two (1998/2000)

Singles from The Art of War
- 1. "Look Into My Eyes" Released: June 3, 1997; 2. "Thug Luv" Released: August 23, 1997; 3. "Body Rott" Released: August 23, 1997; 4. "If I Could Teach the World" Released: October 7, 1997

The Art of War is the third studio album by American hip hop group Bone Thugs-n-Harmony which was released on July 29, 1997. The album sold 394,000 units in its first week of release. The album was certified quadruple Platinum by the RIAA in June 1998. It was the first double-album from Bone Thugs-n-Harmony. The album included the platinum-single "Look into My Eyes", and the gold-single "If I Could Teach the World". The whole album is produced by DJ U-Neek.

A sequel to the album, The Art of War World War 3, was released on December 10, 2013.

== Singles ==
"Look Into My Eyes" was the first commercial and radio single from The Art of War. "Look Into My Eyes" debuted and peaked at number 4 on Billboard Hot 100 and Hot R&B/Hip Hop Songs then debuted and peaked at number 2 on Hot Rap Songs and spent 20 weeks on Billboard Hot 100 and Hot R&B/Hip Hop Songs and spent 35 weeks on Hot Rap Songs. Later, two more two more radio singles were released: "Thug Luv", which ended up charting at number 60 on R&B/Hip-Hop Airplay for 3 weeks, and "Body Rott", which didn't appear on any charts. The final commercial single off the album, "If I Could Teach The World" peaked at number 27 on Hot 100, at number 20 on Hot R&B/Hip Hop Songs and number 3 on Hot Rap Songs.

== Commercial performance ==
The Art of War had sold 394,000 copies in its first week and went along to debut at number 1 on Billboard 200 and Top R&B/Hip-Hop Albums. It dropped to number two on both during the second week, after the release of Puff Daddy & The Family's No Way Out while selling 183,000 copies in its second week to Diddy's 223,000 copies sold.

== Background ==
The album was rumored to be called DNA Level C which is Cleveland backwards. The Art of War was created largely as a response to rappers deemed "Clones" (copycats) by the group. Such rappers included Do or Die, Crucial Conflict, Twista & The Speedknots & Three 6 Mafia.

In the wake of his father's death and Tomica Wright now heading Ruthless, Bizzy Bone was not happy, and thus did not appear for many shows or promotions. Now calling the shots, many tracks were altered by Tomica Wright, attempting to head the group into a new direction. Such tracks include Thug Luv with Sylk-E. Fyne, If I Could Teach the World, Friends, Ready 4 War, Handle The Vibe with Flesh-n-Bone and many others. While the group appeared at Sprite Nite on BET, Keenan Ivory Wayans (with Bizzy), and several other promotions, their tour began to lag without Bizzy.

== Music and lyrics ==
In "Ready 4 War", Bone Thugs-n-Harmony (along with Maje$ty) called out Crucial Conflict directly by name, with Maje$ty even stating, "I'll watch you ride the rodeo straight to the bottom". The tracks "Handle The Vibe," "Look Into My Eyes," "Body Rott," "Ready 4 War," "Hatin' Nation," Wasteland Warriors," "All Original," "Whom Die They Lie" and "U Ain't Bone" can all be considered as diss tracks.

They also changed the name of "Friends" for the cassette version to "How Many of Us Have Them". 2Pac wrote his verse for "Thug Luv" in 1 minute and 51 seconds as confirmed by Bizzy Bone.

== Critical reception ==
Professional ratings
Review scores
Source	Rating
AllMusic	2.5/5 stars
Entertainment Weekly	B
Los Angeles Times	4/4 stars
NME	1/10
Rolling Stone	3/5 stars
The Rolling Stone Album Guide	3.5/5 stars
Smash Hits	4/5 stars
The Source	4/5 stars
USA Today	3/4 stars

The Art of War received mostly positive reviews from music critics, with some critics calling the album sonically superior to its predecessor, E. 1999 Eternal. Others criticized the album's length and repetitive disses toward other rappers. Stephen Thomas Erlewine of AllMusic said, "While the group is capable of producing a catchy single, they don't have the personality to sustain an album, much less a double-disc set. By the end of the second disc, they have repeated all of their ideas at least five times apiece, and only a few of those ideas resulted in actual songs in the first place." J.D. Considine of Entertainment Weekly stated, "Lest the smooth sound of 'Look Into My Eyes' leaves you thinking the Bone Thugs-n-Harmony are really just pop-friendly softies, this 28-song double disc, The Art of War, offsets its slow-and-sweet numbers with bloodthirsty workouts like the shotgun-spiked 'Thug Luv'. But after two hours of these singsong melodies, War seems more like a siege than a surgical strike."

== Legacy ==
Krayzie Bone said in a 2015 interview with HipHopDX that The Art of War was Bone Thugs-n-Harmony's best album, even better than E. 1999 Eternal. Compared to Eternal, whose songs he claimed were planned and written years before they were recorded, The Art of War consisted entirely of newer material that he and the other group members created in the studio. Rapper Wiz Khalifa included the album in his list of 25 favorite albums.

== Track listing ==
All tracks produced by DJ U-Neek

World War 1
No.	Title	Writer(s)	Length
1.	"Retaliation (Intro)"	Bone Thugs-n-Harmony; DJ U-Neek	2:21
2.	"Handle the Vibe"	Antoinette Colandreo; BTNH; U-Neek	4:40
3.	"Look into My Eyes"	BTNH; U-Neek	4:19
4.	"Body Rott"	BTNH; U-Neek	5:01
5.	"It's All Mo' Thug"	BTNH; U-Neek	5:12
6.	"Ready 4 War" (featuring Maje$ty)	Maje$ty; Marilyn McLeod; Pam Sawyer; BTNH; U-Neek; Cedric Feaster Jr.	4:36
7.	"Ain't Nothin' Changed (Everyday Thang Part II)"	Barry J. Eastmond; BTNH; U-Neek	4:43
8.	"Clog Up Yo Mind"	BTNH; U-Neek	5:01
9.	"It's All Real" (performed by Krayzie Bone)	Krayzie Bone; BTNH; U-Neek	5:08
10.	"Hard Times (Interlude)"	BTNH; U-Neek	2:49
11.	"Mind of a Souljah" (performed by Layzie Bone)	Layzie Bone; BTNH; U-Neek	4:39
12.	"If I Could Teach the World"	BTNH; U-Neek	4:24
13.	"Family Tree"	K. McCord; BTNH; U-Neek	5:49

World War 2
No.	Title	Writer(s)	Length
1.	"Mo' Thug (Intro)"	BTNH; U-Neek	1:40
2.	"Thug Luv" (featuring 2Pac)	2Pac; BTNH; U-Neek	5:08
3.	"Hatin' Nation"	BTNH; U-Neek	5:12
4.	"7 Sign" (performed by Bizzy Bone, featuring Maje$ty)	Bizzy Bone; BTNH; U-Neek; Cedric Feaster Jr.	4:48
5.	"Wasteland Warriors" (featuring Souljah Boy)	Souljah Boy; BTNH; U-Neek	4:28
6.	"Neighborhood Slang (Interlude)"	BTNH; U-Neek	1:29
7.	"U Ain't Bone"	BTNH	5:04
8.	"Get Cha Thug On" (performed by Wish Bone, featuring Tre)	Wish Bone; U-Neek	4:02
9.	"All Original"	BTNH; U-Neek	4:58
10.	"Blaze It (Interlude)"	Larry Blackmon; BTNH; U-Neek	2:08
11.	"Let the Law End"	BTNH; U-Neek	3:36
12.	"Whom Die They Lie (Bonus)"	BTNH; U-Neek	4:24
13.	"How Many of Us Have Them (Friends)"	BTNH; U-Neek	5:10
14.	"Evil Paradise"	Tim Stahl; BTNH; U-Neek	4:48
15.	"Mo' Thug Family Tree (featuring Mo Thugs Family)"	BTNH; U-Neek	5:37

Sample credits

World War 1

- "Handle the Vibe" contains a sample of "Love's Gonna Get'cha (Material Love)" as performed by Boogie Down Productions
- "It's All Mo' Thug" contains an interpolation of "Don't Let Me Be Lonely Tonight" as performed by Isaac Hayes
- "Ready 4 War" contains an interpolation of "Love Hangover" as performed by Diana Ross
- "Ain't Nothin Changed (Everyday Thang Part 2)" contains an interpolation of "Love Is Just a Touch Away" as performed by Freddie Jackson
- "Hard Times" contains an interpolation of "Love... Can Be So Wonderful" as performed by the Temprees
- "Mind of a Souljah" contains a sample of "Promise Me" by Luther Vandross
- "Family Tree" contains an interpolation of "If You Play Your Cards Right" by Kevin Mccord

World War 2

- "Blaze It" contains a sample of "Why Have I Lost You" as performed by Cameo
- "Evil Paradise" contains an interpolation of "White Horse" as performed by Laid Back
- "Thug Luv" contains a sample of "Friday the 13th Original Theme" by Harry Manfredini
- "U Ain't Bone" contains an interpolation of "Ring the Alarm" as performed by Tenor Saw
- "Whom Die They Lie" contains an interpolation of "East 1999" as performed by Bone Thugs-N-Harmony
- "Friends" contains an interpolation of "Friends" as performed by Whodini

All samples here are as listed in the Art of War booklet.

=== Appearances ===
- Krayzie Bone appears on 25 tracks.
- Layzie Bone appears on 22 tracks.
- Bizzy Bone appears on 18 tracks.
- Wish Bone appears on 15 tracks.
- Flesh-n-Bone appears on 6 tracks.

The vinyl release omits the tracks 1, 6 and 12 on WW2.

== Charts ==
=== Weekly charts ===
Chart (1997)	Peak position
Canadian Albums (Billboard)	10
Dutch Albums (Album Top 100)	30
Finnish Albums (Suomen virallinen lista)	37
French Albums (SNEP)	44
German Albums (Offizielle Top 100)	38
New Zealand Albums (RMNZ)	4
Swedish Albums (Sverigetopplistan)	50
Swiss Albums (Schweizer Hitparade)	44
UK Albums (Official Charts)	42
UK R&B Albums (Official Charts)	8
US Billboard 200	1
US Top R&B/Hip-Hop Albums (Billboard)	1

=== Year-end charts ===
Chart (1997)	Position
US Billboard 200	47
US Top R&B/Hip-Hop Albums (Billboard)	25

== Certifications ==
Region	Certification	Certified units/sales
Canada (Music Canada)	Gold	50,000^{^}
New Zealand (RMNZ)	Gold	7,500^{^}
United States (RIAA)	4× Platinum	2,000,000^{^}
^{^} Shipments figures based on certification alone.

== See also ==
- List of number-one albums of 1997 (U.S.)
- List of number-one R&B albums of 1997 (U.S.)
