= Thuggish Ruggish Bone =

Single by Bone Thugs-n-Harmony featuring Shatasha Williams

from the album Creepin on ah Come Up
- Released: April 20, 1994
- Recorded: 1993
- Genre: G-funk
- Length: 4:40
- Label: Ruthless/Epic
- Songwriters: Anthony Henderson, Stanley Howse, Bryon McCane, Kenneth McCloud, Steven Howse, Tim Middleton, Charles Scruggs
- Producer: DJ U-Neek

Bone Thugs-n-Harmony singles chronology
"Thuggish Ruggish Bone" (1994)	"Foe tha Love of $" (1994)

"Thuggish Ruggish Bone" is the debut single by American hip hop group Bone Thugs-n-Harmony, from their debut EP, Creepin on ah Come Up (1994). It features singer Shatasha Williams. The song reached #22 on the Billboard Hot 100. The song was included in the soundtrack of the video game True Crime: Streets of LA; and the second half of Layzie Bone's verse was reused on the track "Family Scriptures" on the Mo Thugs Family debut album, Family Scriptures.

== Background ==
During the recording of Creepin on ah Come Up, the members of Bone Thugs-n-Harmony sought to release "Thuggish Ruggish Bone" as the first single, as they felt it conveyed the group's identity most clearly. Other personnel on the label wanted to release "Foe tha Love of $" first instead, but the group ultimately succeeded in convincing Eazy-E that "Thuggish Ruggish Bone" should be their debut.

The music video (directed by Terry Heller) was shot near the Cuyahoga River in western Cleveland, near the Lakeview Estates public housing units. The filming of the video was interrupted by a drive-by shooting; however, nobody on set was injured. The music video also featured rapper Eazy-E.

Accounts differ as to how Shatasha Williams became involved with the song. According to Williams, she reached out to Eazy-E through a mutual connection and Eazy brought her to the studio to record with Bone Thugs-n-Harmony. Conversely, Krayzie Bone states that the group encountered Williams by coincidence near the recording studio, and selected her to sing the chorus after Williams introduced herself as a singer and impressed the group with her performance. Williams stated in 2015 that she had not received any royalty payments for her role in the song. Bizzy Bone corroborated her claim, stating that Eazy-E tended to disburse payments informally rather than signing contracts during that period, with the result that many planned payments fell into disorder after Eazy's 1995 death.

== Track listing ==
1. Thuggish Ruggish Bone (EP Version) (featuring Shatasha Williams) (4:40)
2. Thuggish Ruggish Bone (Instrumental) (4:32)
3. Thuggish Ruggish Bone (A Capella) (4:40)
- Intro – Calvin O. Butts
- Chorus & Outro – Shatasha Williams
- Verse 1 – Layzie Bone
- Verse 2 – Wish Bone
- Verse 3 – Krayzie Bone
- Verse 4 – Bizzy Bone

=== Official versions ===
- Thuggish Ruggish Bone (A Cappella) (4:40)
- Thuggish Ruggish Bone (EP Version) (4:40)
- Thuggish Ruggish Bone (Instrumental) (4:32)

=== Remix ===
- Thuggish Ruggish Bone (U-Neek's Mix), appears on "Foe tha Love of $" single.

== Charts ==
=== Weekly charts ===
Chart (1994)	Peak Position
US Billboard Hot 100	22
US Hot Rap Songs (Billboard)	2
US Hot R&B Songs (Billboard)	11
US Cash Box Top 100	36

=== Year-end charts ===
Chart (1996)	Position
New Zealand (Recorded Music NZ)	48

== Certifications ==
Region	Certification	Certified units/sales
New Zealand (RMNZ)	2× Platinum	60,000^{‡}
United States (RIAA)	Gold	500,000^{^}
^{^} Shipments figures based on certification alone.^{‡} Sales+streaming figures based on certification alone.

== Personnel ==
- Featured Guest: Shatasha Williams
- Producer: DJ U-Neek & Kenny McCloud
- Executive Producer: Eazy-E
- Recorded by: Kenny McCloud at The Blackhole Recording Studio
- Additional Recording and Mixed by: Donovan "Tha Dirt Biker" Sound at Audio Achievement Studios
- Mastered by: "Big Bass" Brian Gardner at Bernie Grundman Mastering
- Published by: Ruthless Attack Muzick (ASCAP), Dollarz N Sense Muzick, Keenu Songs (BMI)
