= DJ U-Neek =

- Born: Tim Middleton; June 15, 1969 (age 56)
- Origin: Los Angeles, California, U.S.
- Genres: Hip hop
- Occupation: Record producer
- Years active: 1993–present
- Labels: Ruthless Records; Thugline Records
- Website: Twitter

Tim Middleton (born June 15, 1969), known professionally by his stage name DJ U-Neek, is an American record producer. Signed to Ruthless Records along with Bone Thugs-n-Harmony, he was nominated for a Grammy Award for Best Rap Album at the 38th Annual Grammy Awards for his production duties on E. 1999 Eternal. Beside his work with Bone Thugs-n-Harmony members and affiliates, he also produced tracks for Low B, The Godfather D, Yo-Yo, Menajahtwa, Mack 10, Angie Stone, Meyhem Lauren and Troy Ave among others. He released his debut studio album Ghetto Street Pharmacist on Thump Street Records in 1999.

== Discography ==
- 1999: Ghetto Street Pharmacist
- 2003: Bone Instrumentals
- 2009: Bone Instrumentals Pt. 2

== Production discography ==
List of songs produced and/or co-produced, with other performing artists, showing year released and album name
Year	Song	Artist	Album	Notes
1990	"I Have Had E'Nuff!"	Low B, Tenda	N/A	N/A
1990	"Dance 2 tha Rhythm"	Low B, Roz	N/A	N/A
1990	"Homie, That's Real"	Low B, Roz	N/A	N/A
1990	"Mo Money"	The Godfather D	N/A	add. prod. w/ Big Money Izreal; prod. by Dalvin Self
1990	"Second 2 None"	The Godfather D	N/A	add. prod. w/ Big Money Izreal; prod. by Dalvin Self
1990	"Callin All Bluffs"	The Godfather D	N/A	add. prod. w/ Big Money Izreal; prod. by Dalvin Self
1994	"Eastside (South Central)"	Original Street Poets	N/A	N/A
1994	"Bowdown"	Original Street Poets	N/A	N/A
1994	Mr. Ouija	Bone Thugs-n-Harmony	Creepin on ah Come Up	—N/a
1994	"Thuggish Ruggish Bone"	Bone Thugs-n-Harmony, Shatasha Williams	Creepin on ah Come Up	N/A
1994	"No Surrender"	Bone Thugs-n-Harmony	Creepin on ah Come Up	co-prod. by Bone Thugs-n-Harmony
1994	"Creepin on ah Come Up"	Bone Thugs-n-Harmony	Creepin on ah Come Up	co-prod. by Bone Thugs-n-Harmony
1994	"Kuz Itz Like Dat"	Menajahtwa, Dresta, The Fyrm	Cha-licious	N/A
1995	"U-Neek's Points"	Notorious B.I.G., Coolio, Doodlebug, Big Mike, Buckshot, Redman, Ill Al Skratch, Heltah Skeltah, Bone Thugs-n-Harmony, Busta Rhymes, 5th Ward Boyz, Jamal	N/A	N/A
1995	"Da Introduction"	Bone Thugs-n-Harmony	E. 1999 Eternal	N/A
1995	"East 1999"	Bone Thugs-n-Harmony	E. 1999 Eternal	co-prod. by Tony-C
1995	"Eternal"	Bone Thugs-n-Harmony	E. 1999 Eternal	co-prod. by Tony-C & Kenny McCloud
1995	"Crept & We Came"	Bone Thugs-n-Harmony	E. 1999 Eternal	co-prod. by Tony-C
1995	"Down '71 (The Getaway)"	Bone Thugs-n-Harmony	E. 1999 Eternal	N/A
1995	"Mr. Bill Collector"	Bone Thugs-n-Harmony	E. 1999 Eternal	co-prod. by Tony-C
1995	"Budsmokers Only"	Bone Thugs-n-Harmony	E. 1999 Eternal	N/A
1995	"Crossroad"	Bone Thugs-n-Harmony	E. 1999 Eternal	co-prod. by Tony-C
1995	"Me Killa (Skit)"	Bone Thugs-n-Harmony	E. 1999 Eternal	co-prod. by Kenny McCloud
1995	"Land of tha Heartless"	Bone Thugs-n-Harmony	E. 1999 Eternal	co-prod. by Bone Thugs-n-Harmony
1995	"Tha Crossroads"	Bone Thugs-n-Harmony	E. 1999 Eternal	co-prod. by Bone Thugs-n-Harmony
1995	"No Shorts, No Losses"	Bone Thugs-n-Harmony	E. 1999 Eternal	co-prod. by Bone Thugs-n-Harmony
1995	"1st of tha Month"	Bone Thugs-n-Harmony	E. 1999 Eternal	N/A
1995	"Buddah Lovaz"	Bone Thugs-n-Harmony	E. 1999 Eternal	co-prod. by Tony-C
1995	"Die, Die, Die"	Bone Thugs-n-Harmony	E. 1999 Eternal	N/A
1995	"Mr. Ouija 2" (Skit)	Bone Thugs-n-Harmony	E. 1999 Eternal	co-prod. by Bone Thugs-n-Harmony
1995	"Mo' Murda"	Bone Thugs-n-Harmony	E. 1999 Eternal	co-prod. by Tony-C
1995	"Shotz to tha Double Glock"	Bone Thugs-n-Harmony, Poetic Hustla'z, the Graveyard Shift	E. 1999 Eternal	co-prod. by Kenny McCloud
1995	"Everyday Thang"	Bone Thugs-n-Harmony	The Show: The Soundtrack	N/A
1995	"Free"	Shatasha Williams	N/A	N/A
1996	"Days of Our Livez"	Bone Thugs-n-Harmony	Set It Off: Music From the New Line Cinema Motion Picture	N/A
1996	"Movin' On"	DJ U-Neek & Nite Owl	The Great White Hype (soundtrack)	—N/a
1996	"Shoot Em Up"	Bone Thugs-n-Harmony	The Great White Hype (soundtrack)	—N/a
1996	"Steady Risin'"	Yo-Yo	Total Control	N/A
1997	"Retaliation (Intro)"	Bone Thugs-n-Harmony	The Art of War	N/A
1997	"Handle the Vibe"	Bone Thugs-n-Harmony	The Art of War	N/A
1997	"Look into My Eyes"	Bone Thugs-n-Harmony	Music from and Inspired by the "Batman & Robin" Motion Picture / The Art of War	N/A
1997	"Body Rott"	Bone Thugs-n-Harmony	The Art of War	N/A
1997	"It's All Mo' Thug"	Bone Thugs-n-Harmony	The Art of War	N/A
1997	"Ready 4 War"	Bone Thugs-n-Harmony, Mr. Maje$ty	The Art of War	N/A
1997	"Ain't Nothin' Changed (Everyday Thang Part II)"	Bone Thugs-n-Harmony	The Art of War	N/A
1997	"Clog Up Yo Mind"	Bone Thugs-n-Harmony	The Art of War	N/A
1997	"It's All Real"	Krayzie Bone	The Art of War	N/A
1997	"Hard Times" (Skit)	Bone Thugs-n-Harmony	The Art of War	N/A
1997	"Mind of a Souljah"	Layzie Bone	The Art of War	N/A
1997	"If I Could Teach The World"	Bone Thugs-n-Harmony	The Art of War	N/A
1997	"Family Tree"	Bone Thugs-n-Harmony	The Art of War	N/A
1997	"Mo' Thug" (Skit)	Bone Thugs-n-Harmony	The Art of War	N/A
1997	"Thug Luv"	Bone Thugs-n-Harmony, 2Pac	The Art of War	N/A
1997	"Hatin' Nation"	Bone Thugs-n-Harmony	The Art of War	N/A
1997	"7 Sign"	Bizzy Bone, Mr. Maje$ty	The Art of War	N/A
1997	"Wasteland Warriors"	Bone Thugs-n-Harmony, Souljah Boy	The Art of War	N/A
1997	"Neighborhood Slang" (Skit)	Bone Thugs-n-Harmony	The Art of War	N/A
1997	"U Ain't Bone"	Bone Thugs-n-Harmony	The Art of War	N/A
1997	"Get Cha Thug On"	Wish Bone, Tré	The Art of War	N/A
1997	"All Original"	Bone Thugs-n-Harmony	The Art of War	N/A
1997	"Blaze It" (Skit)	Bone Thugs-n-Harmony	The Art of War	N/A
1997	"Let the Law End"	Bone Thugs-n-Harmony	The Art of War	N/A
1997	"Whom Die They Lie"	Bone Thugs-n-Harmony	The Art of War	N/A
1997	"How Many of Us Have Them (Friends)"	Bone Thugs-n-Harmony	The Art of War	N/A
1997	"Evil Paradise"	Bone Thugs-n-Harmony	The Art of War	N/A
1997	"Mo' Thug Family Tree"	Bone Thugs-n-Harmony, Mo Thugs	The Art of War	N/A
1998	"The Game"	Mack 10, Big Mike, Earth, Wind & Fire	Ride (Music from the Dimension Motion Picture)	N/A
1998	"Ghetto Horror Show"	Mack 10, Ice Cube, Jayo Felony	The Recipe	prod. w/ Mack 10
1998	"#1 Crew In the Area"	Mack 10, WC, K-Mac, CJ Mac, Binky Mack, Boo Kapone, Techniec, Thump, MC Eiht, Road Dawgs	The Recipe	N/A
1999	"Way Too Strong"	Bizzy Bone	Music from & Inspired by the Hit Television Series the PJs	N/A
1999	"The Ghetto"	Krayzie Bone	Music from & Inspired by the Hit Television Series the PJs	N/A
1999	"Where My Thugz At"	Krayzie Bone	Thug Mentality 1999	N/A
1999	"Visions"	Angie Stone	Black Diamond	N/A
1999	"Ghetto Street Pharmacy (Intro)"	N/A	Ghetto Street Pharmacist	N/A
1999	"On the Run"	Dresta, Cold 187um	Ghetto Street Pharmacist	N/A
1999	"We Come to Serve 'Em"	The Kingpin Family	Ghetto Street Pharmacist	N/A
1999	"California Streets"	L-Jay	Ghetto Street Pharmacist	N/A
1999	"Bring It On"	Jagg	Ghetto Street Pharmacist	N/A
1999	"Now That I'm Over You"	Gemini	Ghetto Street Pharmacist	N/A
1999	"Woe Is I"	Dekumpozed	Ghetto Street Pharmacist	N/A
1999	"The Real Ones"	Big Lurch, Big Bone	Ghetto Street Pharmacist	N/A
1999	"Blaze"	E.W.F., Sneek	Ghetto Street Pharmacist	N/A
1999	"Doctor, Doctor"	Gemini, Bizzy Bone	Ghetto Street Pharmacist	N/A
1999	"Murda Murda"	Layzie Bone, Lethol, L-Jay	Ghetto Street Pharmacist	N/A
1999	"Ain't No Love"	Doggy's Angels, Allfrumtha I	Ghetto Street Pharmacist	N/A
1999	"What Must I Do"	Jaz, Nyt Owl	Ghetto Street Pharmacist	N/A
1999	"On Deck"	Nyt Owl	Ghetto Street Pharmacist	N/A
1999	"Eastsider"	Maneski	Ghetto Street Pharmacist	N/A
1999	"I Want Cha Lovin'"	Lei Callaway, Topp Notch, E.W.F.	Ghetto Street Pharmacist	N/A
1999	"Keep Servin' Em"	The KingPin Family	Ghetto Street Pharmacist	N/A
1999	"Hard"	Virgil "V-Mix" Davis Jr., Tamera Reed	Ghetto Street Pharmacist	N/A
1999	"We Come to Serve 'Em" (Remix)	The Kingpin Family, Krayzie Bone, Gemini, E.W.F., Nyt Owl, L-Jay	Ghetto Street Pharmacist	N/A
2000	"Ecstasy"	Bone Thugs-n-Harmony	BTNHResurrection	N/A
2000	"Murder One"	Bone Thugs-n-Harmony	BTNHResurrection	N/A
2000	"Weed Song"	Bone Thugs-n-Harmony	BTNHResurrection	N/A
2000	"Change the World"	Bone Thugs-n-Harmony, Big B	BTNHResurrection	N/A
2000	"Don't Worry"	Bone Thugs-n-Harmony	BTNHResurrection	N/A
2000	"Mind on Our Money"	Bone Thugs-n-Harmony	BTNHResurrection	N/A
2002	"T.W.O. Intro"	Bone Thugs-n-Harmony, LaReece	Thug World Order	prod. w/ Bone Thugs-n-Harmony
2002	"Bone, Bone, Bone"	Bone Thugs-n-Harmony	Thug World Order	prod. w/ Bone Thugs-n-Harmony
2002	"Home"	Bone Thugs-n-Harmony	Thug World Order	prod. w/ Krayzie Bone
2002	"All the Way"	Bone Thugs-n-Harmony	Thug World Order	prod. w/ Bone Thugs-n-Harmony
2002	"Non-Fiction Words by Eazy-E" (Skit)	Bone Thugs-n-Harmony	Thug World Order	N/A
2002	"Not My Baby"	Bone Thugs-n-Harmony	Thug World Order	prod. w/ Bone Thugs-n-Harmony
2002	"If I Fall"	Bone Thugs-n-Harmony	Thug World Order	prod. w/ Bone Thugs-n-Harmony
2002	"A Thug Soldier Conversation"	Bone Thugs-n-Harmony	Thug World Order	N/A
2003	"Birth of a Thug Nation" (Introduction)	Krayzie Bone	Leatha Face the Legends Underground (Part 1)	N/A
2003	"12 Gauge"	Krayzie Bone, Wish Bone	Leatha Face the Legends Underground (Part 1)	N/A
2003	"Artillery Shop"	Krayzie Bone	Leatha Face the Legends Underground (Part 1)	N/A
2003	"Wanna Be Us"	Krayzie Bone, Bruce Hathcock	Leatha Face the Legends Underground (Part 1)	N/A
2003	"Game Tight"	Krayzie Bone	Leatha Face the Legends Underground (Part 1)	N/A
2003	"Murda Mo' (Fuck'em Yall)"	Krayzie Bone	Leatha Face the Legends Underground (Part 1)	N/A
2003	"The Set Up"	Krayzie Bone, Keef G	Leatha Face the Legends Underground (Part 1)	N/A
2003	"What Would You Do"	Krayzie Bone	Leatha Face the Legends Underground (Part 1)	N/A
2003	"Let It Go"	Krayzie Bone	Leatha Face the Legends Underground (Part 1)	N/A
2003	"How We Roll"	Krayzie Bone	Leatha Face the Legends Underground (Part 1)	N/A
2003	"Smoke wit Me"	Krayzie Bone	Leatha Face the Legends Underground (Part 1)	N/A
2003	"Shut 'Em Down"	Krayzie Bone, Bruce Hathcock	Leatha Face the Legends Underground (Part 1)	N/A
2003	"Intro"	Bruce Hathcock, Krayzie Bone	It's Your World	N/A
2003	"Smokin 3-Sixty-V"	Bruce Hathcock, Layzie Bone	It's Your World	N/A
2003	"It's Your World"	Bruce Hathcock, Layzie Bone, Felecia	It's Your World	N/A
2003	"December Rain"	Bruce Hathcock	It's Your World	N/A
2003	"Down"	Bruce Hathcock	It's Your World	N/A
2003	"Twisted"	Bruce Hathcock	It's Your World	N/A
2003	"Round 'N' Round"	Bruce Hathcock	It's Your World	N/A
2003	"Irresistible"	Bruce Hathcock	It's Your World	N/A
2004	"Rest in Peace"	Brown Regulators	Calling the Shots	prod. w/ Tony-C
2005	"Playa"	Bone Thugs-n-Harmony, Thin C.	Bone-4-Life	N/A
2005	"Playing the Game"	Bone Thugs-n-Harmony, Keef G	Bone-4-Life	N/A
2005	"Put Yo' Hands Up"	Bone Thugs-n-Harmony, Thin C., F.I.S-T	Bone-4-Life	N/A
2005	"Wrong Vs. Right"	Bone Thugs-n-Harmony	Bone-4-Life	N/A
2005	"Hustla"	Bone Thugs-n-Harmony	Bone-4-Life	N/A
2005	"Thug-A-Tone (U-Neek's Medley)"	Bone Thugs-n-Harmony, K-Ci	Bone-4-Life	N/A
2005	"Cleveland Thugstas"	Lil' Chico, Krayzie Bone	Bone-4-Life	N/A
2005	"Do You Wrong"	Keef G	Bone-4-Life	N/A
2005	"Everlasting"	Bruce Hathcock	Bone-4-Life	N/A
2005	"These Streets"	Layzie Bone, Felecia	Bone-4-Life	N/A
2005	"Kneight Rider Express"	Knieght Rieduz	Bone-4-Life	N/A
2006	"She Got Crazy"	Bone Thugs-n-Harmony	Thug Stories	N/A
2010	"The Law (Intro)"	Bone Thugs-n-Harmony	Uni5: The World's Enemy	N/A
2010	"Fearless (Interlude)"	Bone Thugs-n-Harmony	Uni5: The World's Enemy	N/A
2010	"Universe"	Bone Thugs-n-Harmony	Uni5: The World's Enemy	N/A
2010	"A New Mind = a New Life (Interlude)"	Bone Thugs-n-Harmony	Uni5: The World's Enemy	N/A
2010	"Pay What They Owe"	Bone Thugs-n-Harmony	Uni5: The World's Enemy	N/A
2010	"Facts Don't Lie"	Bone Thugs-n-Harmony	Uni5: The World's Enemy	N/A
2010	"My Street Blues"	Bone Thugs-n-Harmony	Uni5: The World's Enemy	N/A
2010	"The Intro"	Bizzy Bone	The Greatest Rapper Alive	N/A
2010	"Helicopters"	Bizzy Bone	The Greatest Rapper Alive	N/A
2010	"My World"	Bizzy Bone	The Greatest Rapper Alive	N/A
2010	"Dig This"	Bizzy Bone	The Greatest Rapper Alive	N/A
2010	"Eye Candy"	Bizzy Bone	The Greatest Rapper Alive	N/A
2010	"Only In LA"	Bizzy Bone	The Greatest Rapper Alive	N/A
2010	"3rd Round Knockout"	Bizzy Bone	The Greatest Rapper Alive	N/A
2010	"Shoes 'N' Clothes"	Bizzy Bone	The Greatest Rapper Alive	N/A
2010	"Young Man"	Bizzy Bone	The Greatest Rapper Alive	N/A
2010	"Warriors"	Bizzy Bone	The Greatest Rapper Alive	N/A
2010	"One Shot"	Bizzy Bone	The Greatest Rapper Alive	N/A
2010	"U.F.O's"	Bizzy Bone	The Greatest Rapper Alive	N/A
2010	"Yeah That's It"	Bizzy Bone	The Greatest Rapper Alive	N/A
2010	"I Am the Greatest"	Bizzy Bone	The Greatest Rapper Alive	N/A
2010	"The Outro"	Bizzy Bone	The Greatest Rapper Alive	N/A
2012	"Cedar Plank Salmon"	Meyhem Lauren	Mandatory Brunch Meetings	N/A
2013	"Everything"	Troy Ave, Pusha T	New York City: The Album	N/A
2013	"WWIII (Introduction)"	Bone Thugs-n-Harmony	The Art of War: World War III	N/A
2013	"Top Notch"	Bone Thugs-n-Harmony	The Art of War: World War III	N/A
2013	"Bone"	Bone Thugs-n-Harmony, Tanieya Weathington	The Art of War: World War III	N/A
2013	"Bring It Back"	Bone Thugs-n-Harmony	The Art of War: World War III	N/A
2013	"Approach 2 Danger"	Bone Thugs-n-Harmony	The Art of War: World War III	N/A
2013	"Bitch Iz a Bitch"	Bone Thugs-n-Harmony	The Art of War: World War III	N/A
2013	"It's a Bone Thang"	Bone Thugs-n-Harmony	The Art of War: World War III	N/A
2013	"Back in tha Dayz"	Bone Thugs-n-Harmony, Tanieya Weathington	The Art of War: World War III	N/A
2013	"Walk This Way"	Bone Thugs-n-Harmony, Big B	The Art of War: World War III	N/A
2013	"Swagged Out"	Bone Thugs-n-Harmony	The Art of War: World War III	N/A
2013	"It Will Be Alright"	Bone Thugs-n-Harmony, Por'cha	The Art of War: World War III	co-prod. by DJ Battlecat
2013	"In Memory of Eazy"	Bone Thugs-n-Harmony, Bruce Hathcock, Phaedra	The Art of War: World War III	N/A

== Awards and nominations ==
Year	Nominee / work	Award	Result	Ref.
1995	E. 1999 Eternal	Grammy Award for Best Rap Album	Nominated	
