= Layzie Bone discography =

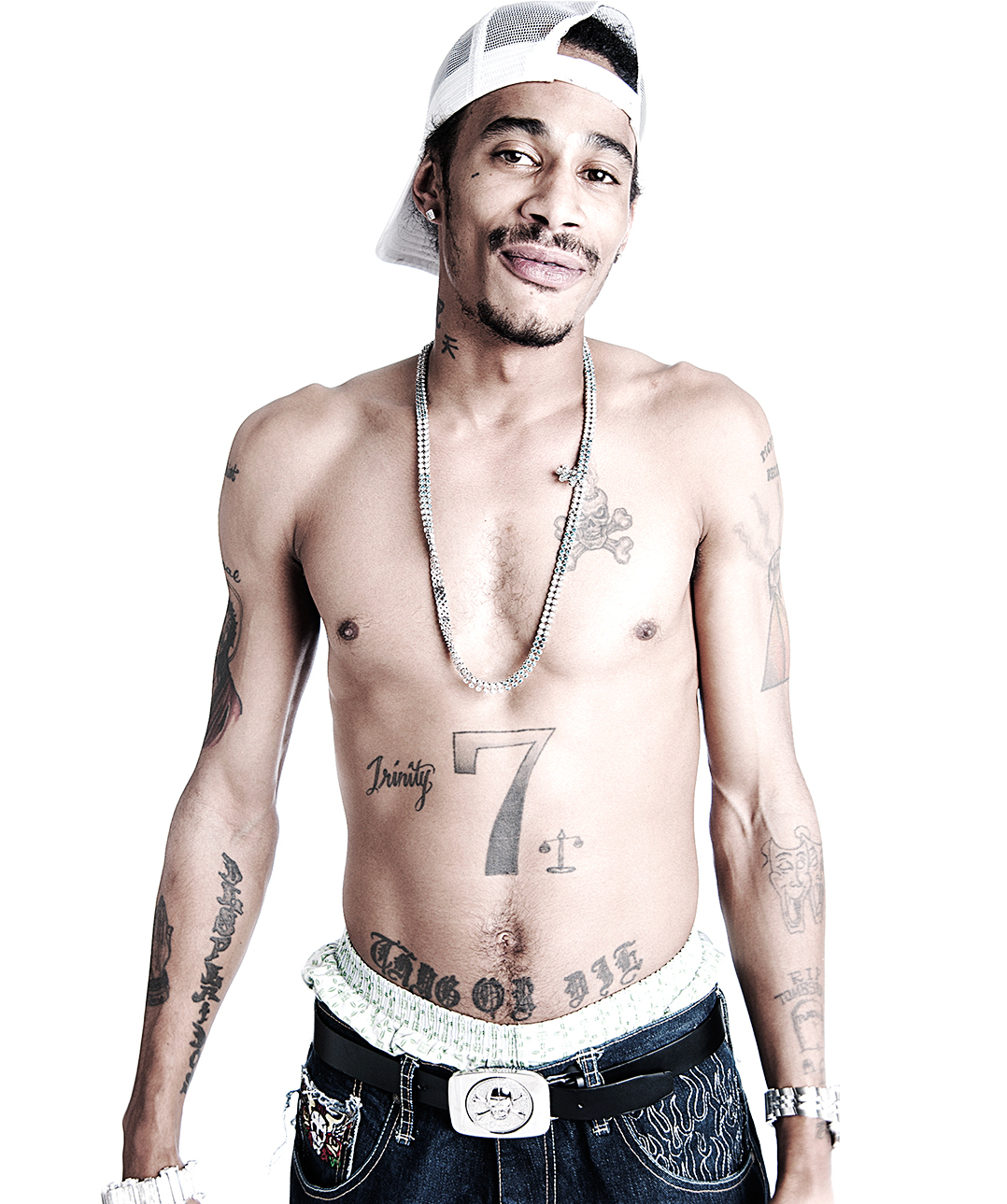
- Studio albums: 12
- Compilation albums: 8
- Mixtapes: 4

This is the discography of American rapper Layzie Bone.

== Albums ==
=== Solo studio albums ===
List of studio albums, with selected chart positions
Title	Details	Peak chart positions			
Title	Details	US	US R&B/HH	US Rap	US Indie
Thug by Nature	Released: March 20, 2001; Label: Ruthless Records	43	17	—	—
It's Not a Game	Released: May 31, 2005; Label: Mo Thugs/X-Ray Records	96	31	15	4
The New Revolution	Released: August 22, 2006; Label: B-Dub Records	—	69	—	—
Cleveland	Released: October 17, 2006; Label: Siccness.net	—	—	—	—
Startin' from Scratch: How a Thug Was Born	Released: July 24, 2007; Label: Mo Thugs Records	—	37	14	50
Thugz Nation	Released: March 4, 2008; Label: Hi Power Entertainment/PMC Music Group	—	—	—	—
The Definition	Released: February 22, 2011; Label: Harmony Howse Ent./RBC Records	—	—	—	—
The Meaning	Released: February 22, 2011; Label: Harmony Howse Ent./RBC Records	—	—	—	—
Annihilation	Released: April 19, 2019; Label: Harmony Howse Ent.	—	—	—	—
Lost and Found	Released: August 16, 2019; Label: Harmony Howse Ent.	—	—	—	—
Wanted Dead or Alive	Released: July 15, 2020; Label: Harmony Howse Ent.	—	—	—	—
Hypnotic Rhythms	Released: December 22, 2023; Label: Harmony Howse Ent.	—	—	—	—
D.A.S.H	Released: July 3, 2026; Label: Harmony Howse Ent.	__	__	__	__

=== Collaborative studio albums ===
List of studio albums, with selected chart positions
Title	Details	Peak chart positions			
Title	Details	US	US R&B/HH	US Rap	US Indie
Bone Brothers (with Bizzy Bone)	Released: February 22, 2005; Label: Koch Records	60	18	8	3
Thug Brothers (with Young Noble)	Released: February 7, 2006; Label: Real Talk Entertainment	—	90	—	30
Bone Brothers 2 (with Bizzy Bone)	Released: May 8, 2007; Label: Real Talk Entertainment	122	26	7	11
Bone Brothers III (with Bizzy Bone)	Released: February 5, 2008; Label: Koch Records	—	59	23	46
Still Creepin on Ah Come Up (with Bizzy Bone)	Released: March 18, 2008; Label: Real Talk Entertainment	—	—	—	—
Finally (with A.K.)	Released: 2008; Label: Siccness.net	—	84	—	—
Thug Twinz (with Big Sloan)	Released: August 11, 2009; Label: Hi Power Entertainment	—	—	—	—
Eyez on the Prize (with HC the Chemist)	Released: November 26, 2021; Label: Harmony Howse Entertainment	—	—	—	—

=== Mixtapes ===
- Thug Luv (2011)
- The Law of Attraction (hosted by DJ Smallz) (2011)
- Smoke With Me Vol. 1 digital download (2023)
- 2 Eazy (2023)

== Guest appearances ==
List of non-single guest appearances, with other performing artists, showing year released and album name
Title	Year	Other artist(s)	Album
"Ghetto Bluez"	1996	II Tru	Family Scriptures
"Thug Devotion"	1996	Ken Dawg, Krayzie Bone, Souljah Boy, Tré	Family Scriptures
"Family Scriptures"	1996	Graveyard Shift, Poetic Hustla'z, II Tru, Ken Dawg, Souljah Boy, Krayzie Bone, Flesh-n-Bone, Tré	Family Scriptures
"North Coast"	1996	Flesh-n-Bone, Tiarra Damon	T.H.U.G.S. (Trues Humbly United Gatherin' Souls)
"Playa Hater"	1996	Flesh-n-Bone, Krayzie Bone	T.H.U.G.S. (Trues Humbly United Gatherin' Souls)
"So High"	1997	II Tru, Krayzie Bone	A New Breed of Female
"Day & Night"	1997	Poetic Hustla'z	Trials & Tribulations
"Mighty Mo Thug"	1998	Souljah Boy	Family Scriptures Chapter II: Family Reunion
"Heart of It"	1998	Skant Bone	Family Scriptures Chapter II: Family Reunion
"Ghetto Cowboy"	1998	Krayzie Bone, Powder, Thug Queen, Felecia	Family Scriptures Chapter II: Family Reunion
"Believe"	1998	MT5, Krayzie Bone	Family Scriptures Chapter II: Family Reunion
"Otherside"	1998	Flesh-n-Bone, Krayzie Bone, Thug Queen, Felecia, Ken Dawg, Sin, Mo! Hart, Skant Bone	Family Scriptures Chapter II: Family Reunion
"No Sense"	1998	Gerald Levert, Ken Dawg	Love & Consequences
"Good Times"	1998	Fat Joe, Krayzie Bone	Don Cartagena
"The War Iz On"	1999	Krayzie Bone, Snoop Dogg, Kurupt	Thug Mentality 1999
"Pimpz, Thugz, Gangstaz, Hustlaz"	1999	Krayzie Bone, 8Ball & MJG	Thug Mentality 1999
"Murda Murda"	1999	DJ U-Neek, Lethol, L-Jay	Ghetto Street Pharmacist
"Held Up"	2000	Mo Thugs	Held Up: Original Motion Picture Soundtrack
"One Day"	2000	TQ	The Second Coming
"Who Forgot About It"	2000	Desperidos	Mo Thugs III: The Mothership
"Seldom Seen"	2000	Seldom Seen, TN-Tee	Mo Thugs III: The Mothership
"The Backyard"	2000	J-Bone	Mo Thugs III: The Mothership
"Gunline"	2000	Desperidos, Black Hole Of Watts	Mo Thugs III: The Mothership
"This Ain't Livin'"	2000	Felecia	Mo Thugs III: The Mothership
"Did He Really Wanna?"	2000	Desperidos	Mo Thugs III: The Mothership
"Total Kaos"	2000	Desperidos	Mo Thugs III: The Mothership
"Tighten up Your Operation"	2000	Desperidos	Mo Thugs III: The Mothership
"Everything Green"	2000	—N/a	Mo Thugs III: The Mothership
"Way Back"	2000	Flesh-n-Bone, Ms. Chaz	5th Dog Let Loose
"If You Could See"	2000	Flesh-n-Bone, Wish Bone	5th Dog Let Loose
"Mafia Lifestyle"	2000	Boo-Yaa T.R.I.B.E.	Mafia Lifestyle
"Pleezbaleevit!"	2000	Doggy's Angels, Snoop Dogg	Pleezbaleevit!
"Livin Like Kings"	2000	Konishiki	KMG
"Thug Love"	2001	Angie Martinez, Fat Joe	Up Close and Personal
"Front Line Homies"	2002	Bizzy Bone	Tru Dawgs
"Hydro"	2003	Twiztid	The Green Book
"Head To The Ground"	2004	Bizzy Bone	The Beginning and the End'
"Represent"	2005	Play-N-Skillz	The Process
"Came Up"	2006	dead prez, Outlawz	Can't Sell Dope Forever
"Thug By Heart"	2006	K-Ci	My Book
"From the 216 to the 213"	2006	Mr. Criminal	Stay on the Streets
"Ridin in the Streets"	2006	Bizzy Bone, Mr. Criminal	Thugs Revenge
"Rollercoaster"	2008	Bizzy Bone	Ruthless
"Aint It a Shame"	2009	Malina Moye	Diamonds & Guitars
"Regardless"	2010	Dizzy Wright	The Growing Process
"Mo Thug Love"	2010	Thin C, Big Sloan	Street Bombs, Vol. 2
"Ball Cautiously"	2010	Outlawz, Bizzy Bone	The Lost Songs Vol. 3
"Make It Last"	2010	Outlawz, Krayzie Bone	The Lost Songs Vol. 3
"Better Way"	2011	Saigon	The Greatest Story Never Told
"60 Second Assassins"	2011	DJ Kay Slay, Busta Rhymes, Twista, Jaz-O	none
"I Guess I'll Smoke"	2014	Futuristic, Dizzy Wright	Traveling Local
"Sidelines"	2015	Spice 1	Haterz Nightmare
"You Don't Wanna"	2015	Fortay, Lil Eazy E, Big Sloan	Hustlers Prayer
"Nothin' 2 Lose"	2015	Kold-Blooded	FaceKloud
"Odda Here"	2017	Thin C, Flesh-n-Bone	Cannibliss
"Everyday 420"	2017	Thin C, Clyde Drake	Cannibliss
"Faided Blazing"	2017	Thin C	Cannibliss
"Get It Crackin"	2017	Whyte Smoke, Mr. Criminal	Anxiety
"Bitch Move"	2017	DJ Paul, Lil Jon, Lord Infamous	Underground, Vol.17 - For da Summa
"Shooter"	2018	Yukmouth, Tech N9ne, Rajeo	JJ Based on a Vill Story Three
"Elevate"	2018	Mr Criminal, Wiz Khalifa	Redemption
"Unity"	2018	Mr Criminal, Krayzie Bone	Redemption
"Bankroll"	2019	Ray Jr, Krayzie Bone	Old to the City, New to the World
"New Hampshire Daze"	2025	Calm Ron Ali	none

== Music videos ==
Year	Title	Director(s)
2001	"Make My Day" w/ Baby S	
2001	"Listen"	
2005	"Hip Hop Baby" w/ Bizzy Bone & Krayzie Bone	
2006	"Livin' Like Kings" w/ Konishiki	
2006	"What They Say About Me (remix)" w/ Skant bone	Ryan Cain O'Donnell
2006	"Rollercoaster" w/ Bizzy Bone	
2009	"Wring Me Out" w/ Big Sloan & Thin C	Wes Greeson
2010	"If I Can't Do It"	Eric Guerrero
2011	"Hear'em Knockin" w/ Krayzie Bone & Flesh-n-Bone	Beejan Iranshad
2011	"Every Night" w/ Bow Wow	Meatloaf Yahola
2011	"A New Life" w/ Thin C	
2011	"Ain't Nothin to Me" w/ Maybach Dice	
2011	"We At It Again"	Ryan Cain O'Donnell
2014	"I Hustle"	
2015	"Cleveland is The City" w/ Aaron "D-Boyy" Dissell	
2016	"I Made It"	Mr. Criminal
