= Krayzie Bone discography =

American rapper Krayzie Bone has released nine studio albums.

== Albums ==
=== Studio albums ===
List of albums, with selected chart positions and certifications
Title	Album details	Peak chart positions				Certifications
Title	Album details	US	US R&B	US Rap	AUS	Certifications
Thug Mentality 1999	Released: April 6, 1999; Label: Ruthless, Relativity; Format: CD, LP, cassette, digital download	4	2	—	82	RIAA: Platinum
Thug on da Line	Released: August 28, 2001; Label: Loud, Columbia; Format: CD, LP, cassette, digital download	27	13	—	—	
Gemini: Good vs. Evil	Released: February 8, 2005; Label: Ball'r; Format: CD, digital download	69	19	9	—	
Chasing The Devil: Temptation	Released: November 20, 2015; Label: Krayzie Bone Media LLC / RBC Records; Format: CD, digital download	—	27	—	—	
Eternal Legend	Released: June 23, 2017; Label: Real Talk Entertainment; Format: CD, digital download	—	51	34	—	
E.1999: The LeathaFace Project	Released: October 13, 2017; Label: Real Talk Entertainment; Format: CD, digital download	—	78	65	—	
Quick Fix: Level 2	Released: September 24, 2019; Label: The Life; Format: CD, digital download	—	—	—	—	
Leaves of Legends	Released: April 20, 2021; Label: The Life; Format: CD, digital download	—	—	—	—	
Krayzie Melodies: Melodious, Vol. 1	Released: April 22, 2022; Label: The Life; Format: CD, digital download	—	—	—	—	
QuickFix : Level 3 : Level Up	Released: April 20, 2023; Label: The Life; Format: CD, digital download	—	—	—	—	

=== Underground albums ===
- Leatha Face: Underground (Part 1) (2003)
- Streets Most Wanted (2005)
- Leatha Face Presents - Kneight Riduz - Tha Undaland (2006)

=== Collaboration albums ===
- Thug Brothers 2 (with Young Noble) (2017)
- New Waves (with Bizzy Bone) (2017)
- Thug Brothers 3 (with Young Noble) (2017)

=== Compilation albums ===
- Too Raw for Retail (2005)
- Mellow, Smooth and Krayzie (2007)
- Everybody Wants a Thug (2010)

=== Mixtapes ===
List of mixtapes, with selected chart positions
Title	Album details	Peak chart positions	
Title	Album details	US R&B	US Rap
Thugline Boss	Released: September 4, 2007; Label: Gheet; Format: CD, digital download	44	21
The Fixtape Vol. 1: Smoke on This	Released: April 1, 2008; Label: RBC Video; Format: digital download	66	—
The Fixtape Vol. 2: Just One Mo Hit	Released: March 24, 2009; Label: RBC Video; Format: CD, digital download	43	16
The Fixtape Vol. 3: Lyrical Paraphernalia	Released: July 27, 2010; Label: RBC Video; Format: CD, digital download	64	—
The Fixtape Vol. 4: Under The Influence	Released: November 22, 2011; Label: RBC Records; Format: CD, digital download	1	—

== Extended plays ==
- Quick Fix: Less Drama. More Music. (Level 1) (2013)
- Nothing Left To Prove digital release

== Singles ==
=== As lead artist ===
List of singles as a lead artist, with selected chart positions, showing year released and album name
Title	Year	Peak chart positions			Album
Title	Year	US Bub.	US R&B	US Rhyth.	Album
"Thug Mentality"	1999	9	47	28	Thug Mentality 1999
"Paper"	1999	—	—	—	Thug Mentality 1999
"Hard Time Hustlin'" (featuring Sade)	2001	—	—	—	Thug on da Line
"Get'chu Twisted"	2005	—	—	—	Gemini: Good vs. Evil
"Alone in a Crowded Room"	2022	—	—	—	Krayzie Melodies: Melodious, Vol. 1
"You Bring My High (Down)"	2022	—	—	—	Krayzie Melodies: Melodious, Vol. 1
"—" denotes a recording that did not chart.

=== As featured artist ===
List of singles as a featured artist, with selected chart positions and certifications, showing year released and album name
Title	Year	Peak chart positions										Certifications	Album
Title	Year	US	US R&B	US Rap	AUS	GER	IRL	NZ	SWE	SWI	UK	Certifications	Album
"Until We Rich" (Ice Cube featuring Krayzie Bone)	2000	—	50	—	—	—	—	—	—	—	—		War & Peace Vol. 2 (The Peace Disc)
"I Don't Give a Fuck" (Lil Jon & The East Side Boyz featuring Krayzie Bone and Mystikal)	2002	—	50	—	—	68	—	—	—	—	—		Kings of Crunk
"Freaks" (Play-N-Skillz featuring Krayzie Bone and Adina Howard)	2004	69	52	22	—	—	—	—	—	—	—		The Process
"Spit Your Game" (The Notorious B.I.G. featuring Twista, Krayzie Bone and 8Ball & MJG)	2006	—	68	—	—	—	47	—	—	76	64		Duets: The Final Chapter
"Ridin'" (Chamillionaire featuring Krayzie Bone)	2006	1	7	2	24	8	2	2	25	19	2	RIAA: 4× Platinum; BPI: Gold; BVMI: Gold; GLF: Gold; RMNZ: Gold	The Sound of Revenge
"Untouchable" (Swizz Beatz Remix) (2Pac featuring Krayzie Bone)	2006	— (Note: "Untouchable" did not enter the Billboard Hot 100, but peaked at number eleven on the Bubbling Under Hot 100 Singles chart.)	91	—	—	—	—	—	—	—	—		Pac's Life
"Cash Money" (YG featuring Krayzie Bone)	2015	—	—	—	—	—	—	—	—	—	—		Still Krazy
"Time for Change (Black Lives Matter)" (Mysonne and Trae tha Truth featuring T.I., Styles P, Ink, Anthony Hamilton, Conway the Machine, Krayzie Bone, E-40, David Banner, Bun B, Tamika Mallory and Lee Merritt)	2020	—	—	—	—	—	—	—	—	—	—		If You're Scared Stay Inside
"Come My Way" (Saba featuring Krayzie Bone)	2022	—	—	—	—	—	—	—	—	—	—		Few Good Things
"—" denotes a recording that did not chart or was not released in that territory.

== Guest appearances ==
List of non-single guest appearances, with other performing artists, showing year released and album name
Title	Year	Other performer(s)	Album
"Let's All Get High"	1996	Da Brat	Anuthatantrum
"Mo' Murder"	1996	—N/a	Family Scriptures
"Take Your Time"	1996	Tré	Family Scriptures
"Thug Devotion"	1996	Ken Dawg, Layzie Bone, Souljah Boy, Tré	Family Scriptures
"No Pretender"	1996	Boogie Nikke, Jhaz, Tombstone	Family Scriptures
"Low Down"	1996	Souljah Boy	Family Scriptures
"Family Scriptures"	1996	Flesh-n-Bone, Graveyard Shift, II Tru, Ken Dawg, Layzie Bone, Poetic Hustla'z, Souljah Boy, Tré	Family Scriptures
"Playa Hater"	1996	Flesh-n-Bone, Layzie Bone	T.H.U.G.S. (Trues Humbly United Gatherin' Souls)
"So High"	1997	II Tru, Layzie Bone	A New Breed of Female
"Weekend Buzz"	1997	Poetic Hustla'z	Trials & Tribulations
"Mo' Thug Intro"	1998	Felecia	Family Scriptures Chapter II: Family Reunion
"Mighty Mighty Warrior"	1998	Felecia, Souljah Boy, Thug Queen, Wish Bone	Family Scriptures Chapter II: Family Reunion
"The Queen"	1998	Thug Queen	Family Scriptures Chapter II: Family Reunion
"All Good"	1998	Felecia	Family Scriptures Chapter II: Family Reunion
"Ghetto Cowboy"	1998	Felecia, Layzie Bone, Powder, Thug Queen	Family Scriptures Chapter II: Family Reunion
"Believe"	1998	Layzie Bone, MT5	Family Scriptures Chapter II: Family Reunion
"Ain't Said No Names"	1998	Cat Cody, Tombstone	Family Scriptures Chapter II: Family Reunion
"U Don't Own Me"	1998	Potion	Family Scriptures Chapter II: Family Reunion
"Ride with a Playa"	1998	Ken Dawg	Family Scriptures Chapter II: Family Reunion
"Otherside"	1998	Felecia, Flesh-n-Bone, Ken Dawg, Layzie Bone, Mo! Hart, Sin, Skant Bone, Thug Queen	Family Scriptures Chapter II: Family Reunion
"Don't Hate on Me"	1998	Jermaine Dupri, Da Brat	Life in 1472
"Good Times"	1998	Fat Joe, Layzie Bone	Don Cartagena
"Thugs & Hustlers"	1999	Naughty by Nature, Mag	Nineteen Naughty Nine: Nature's Fury
"Get Away"	1999	TQ	Blue Streak: The Album (soundtrack)
"Up There"	1999	Project Pat, Mac E	Ghetty Green
"The Ghetto"	1999	O	The PJs (soundtrack)
"We Come to Serve 'Em" (Remix)	1999	DJ U-Neek, The Kingpin Family, Gemini, E.W.F., NytOwl, L-J	Ghetto Street Pharmacist
"Rebel Music (3 O'Clock Roadblock)"	1999	Bob Marley and the Wailers	Chant Down Babylon
"I Still Believe/Pure Imagination" (Remix)	1999	Mariah Carey, Da Brat	I Still Believe 12"
"Friday"	1999	Lyric	Next Friday (soundtrack)
"Murder Murder"	2000	The Comrads	Wake Up & Ball
"Is It Me?"	2000	Damon Sharpe	Damizza Presents Where I Wanna Be
"Lord What Have I Done?"	2000	Layzie Bone, Shade Sheist	Damizza Presents Where I Wanna Be
"I'm Not Sleeping"	2000	Tiffany	The Color of Silence
"Chedda"	2000	Big Caz, LV	Thundadome
"Thugs Cry" (Remix)	2000	Bizzy Bone, Layzie Bone	—N/a
"Somebody's Gotta Die"	2001	Coolio	Coolio.com
"Pay Day"	2001	Big Syke, Mack 10, Young Noble	Thug Law: Thug Life Outlawz Chapter 1
"Ain't Spending Nuthin'"	2002	Uncle Luke	Scandalous: The All Star Compilation
"Do Your Thang"	2003	Felecia, Layzie Bone	The Movement
"Be Free"	2003	Layzie Bone	The Movement
"Thug Finale"	2003	Skant Bone, Emmortal Thugs, Layzie Bone	The Movement
"Breakdown" (The Mo' Thugs Remix)	2003	Mariah Carey, Wish Bone	The Remixes
"Fuck da Law"	2003	Detroit Diamond	Multiply
"Walk Like a Warrior"	2004	Dead Prez	RBG: Revolutionary but Gangsta
"What's Friends"	2005	Bone Brothers	Bone Brothers
"Need Your Body"	2005	Bone Brothers, Kareem	Bone Brothers
"Hip Hop Baby"	2005	Bone Brothers	Bone Brothers
"Real Life"	2005	Bone Brothers, Treach	Bone Brothers
"Str8 Ridaz"	2005	Bone Brothers	Bone Brothers
"Everyday"	2005	Bone Thugs-n-Harmony	Bone Brothers
"Freaks" (Remix)	2005	Play-N-Skillz, Adina Howard, Bun B, Pitbull	The Album Before the Album
"Thug Nation"	2005	Layzie Bone	It's Not a Game
"Thug Nation Invasion"	2005	Keef G	Da Bum
"Moma Use to Say"	2005	Keef G	Da Bum
"Real Life"	2005	Keef G, Kaymont	Da Bum
"Satisfied"	2005	Keef G, Asu, Bruce Hathcock	Da Bum
"Smoke Some More"	2005	Keef G	Da Bum
"Don't Forget About Us" (Remix)	2005	Mariah Carey, Layzie Bone, Juelz Santana	—N/a
"Intro"	2006	Skant Bone	4 Seasonz
"Never Let You Down"	2006	Frankie J, Layzie Bone	Priceless
"Destroy You"	2006	DJ Khaled, Twista	Listennn... the Album
"Here We Come"	2006	Knieght Rieduz	Tha Undaland
"We Got Hot Haze"	2006	Knieght Rieduz	Tha Undaland
"Defend Your Own"	2007	Collie Buddz	Collie Buddz
"Fly the Coup"	2007	Layzie Bone, Big Caz	Startin' from Scratch: How a Thug Was Born
"Burn 2007"	2007	Layzie Bone, Keef G, Thin C.	Startin' from Scratch: How a Thug Was Born
"The Bill Collecta"	2007	Chamillionaire	Ultimate Victory
"Toast 2 That"	2008	Layzie Bone, Wish Bone, Swizz Beatz	Thugz Nation
"Bone Thug Boys"	2008	Layzie Bone, Wish Bone	Thugz Nation
"Runnin' up on da Punk Police"	2008	Layzie Bone	Thugz Nation
"Mind Off This Money"	2008	Layzie Bone	Thugz Nation
"Paradise"	2008	TQ	Paradise
"Cloud 9"	2008	Lootenant	Second in Charge
"Posted on the Block" (Remix)	2008	C-Murder, Papoose, Mia X, Verse	Screamin' 4 Vengeance
"Stay Down"	2008	A-Wax, Akon, DJ Kay Slay, Noose	Pyrex Music
"Meal Ticket"	2008	Daz Dillinger	Only on the Left Side
"Cruel Intentions"	2008	Lameez	Cruel Intentions: The Aftermath of 1995
"Girl You Blow My Mind"	2008	Mr. Criminal	Rise to Power
"Midwest Choppers 2"	2009	Tech N9ne	Sickology 101
"One Mo' Gin"	2009	Play-N-Skillz, Bun B, Lil' Jon	Recession Proof
"Money Fold'n"	2009	Tha Dogg Pound	That Was Then, This Is Now
"Make It Last"	2010	Napoleon, Layzie Bone, E.D.I., Kastro, Young Noble	The Lost Songs Vol. 3
"Hear 'Em Knockin'"	2011	Layzie Bone, Flesh-n-Bone	The Definition
"Better Days"	2011	Layzie Bone, Wish Bone, Felecia	The Meaning
"Fallin’"	2011	Flesh-n-Bone, Bizzy Bone, Layzie Bone	Blaze of Glory
"Can’t Take It"	2011	Flesh-n-Bone, Layzie Bone, Wish Bone	Blaze of Glory
"Dont Wait"	2011	Outlawz	Perfect Timing
"Warriors"	2011	Bizzy Bone, A.C. Killer	Countdown to Armageddon
"Go Dumb"	2011	Ray Cash	Champagne Talk
"Stay Sleep"	2012	Chip tha Ripper	Tell Ya Friends
"Kush Cloud"	2012	Freddie Gibbs, SpaceGhostPurrp	Baby Face Killa
"Welcome to Real Life"	2012	Young Noble, Arsonal Da Rebel, Hussein Fatal, Tony Atlanta, King Malachi	Son of God
"Way to Go"	2012	K Koke, Pozition	Best of U.S.G Volume 2
"Hustleholic"	2013	Young Noble, Gage Gully	The Year of the Underdogz
"Jack Move"	2013	Durty White Boyz	Firecrackaz
"Echos in My Head"	2013	Eko Fresh, Summer Cem, Serc651, Ado Kojo	—N/a
"Slum Life"	2013	Bukshot, Delusional, Crucifix	Helter Skelter
"Murder on My Mind"	2013	Da Mafia 6ix, SpaceGhostPurrp, Bizzy Bone	6ix Commandments
"Stay Trill (Bill Collector)"	2013	Trae tha Truth	I Am King
"Ho'Lat"	2013	Andre Nickatina	Andre Nickatina
"Don't Ever Forget"	2015	Dizzy Wright	The Growing Process
"Run Yo Mouth"	2015	Spice 1	Haterz Nightmare
"Still Getting It"	2015	Erick Sermon	E.S.P. (Erick Sermon's Perception)
"Decisions"	2015	E.D.I., Freddie Gibbs, Young Noble	The Hope Dealer, Pt. 1
"Whatcha Want"	2016	10,000 Cadillacs, Bizzy Bone	10K
"Since We Lost Y'all"	2016	Z-Ro	Drankin' & Drivin'
"Midwest Choppers 3"	2016	K.A.B.O.S.H., Bizzy Bone	American Psycho
"Line"	2017	Antonio Faraò	Eklektik
"Love My City"	2017	Nova the Rebel	Thinking Out Loud
"Thug On"	2018	Tha Chill	4Wit80
"In the Way"	2018	Berner, Bizzy Bone, DJ Paul	Rico
"Bankroll"	2019	Ray Jr., Layzie Bone	Old to the City, New to the World
"Déjà Vu"	2019	Dionne Warwick	She's Back
"Killer Instinct"	2020	Layzie Bone, Flesh-n-Bone	Wanted Dead or Alive
"Blockin' My Blessings"	2020	Celly Cel	Focused
"Ride"	2020	Jay Worthy, Shlohmo	Til' the Morning

== Music videos ==
- "Thug Mentality"
- "Paper"
- "Hard Time Hustlin'"
- "Get'chu Twisted"
- "Life! A Lesson to Learn"
- "Hard to Let Go"
- "Explosive"
- "Stand the Pain"
- "Cashin Out (Remix)"
- "24/7 The Grinder"
- "Get Down"
- "Another Level"
- "Apply The Pressure"
- "Head Hunters"
- "Cloudy"
- "Keight Riduz - Here We Come (Live)"
