= Mo Thugs discography =

- Studio albums: 4
- Singles: 6

The discography of American hip hop collective Mo Thugs consists of four studio albums and six singles.

== Studio albums ==
List of albums, with selected chart positions
Title	Album details	Peak chart positions				Certifications
Title	Album details	US	US R&B	US Indie	NZ	Certifications
Mo Thugs Family Scriptures	Released: November 1, 1996; Label: Relativity; Format: CD, cassette, LP	2	2	—	20	RIAA: Platinum
Family Scriptures Chapter II: Family Reunion	Released: May 26, 1998; Label: Relativity; Format: CD, cassette, LP	25	8	—	—	RIAA: Gold
Layzie Bone Presents Mo Thugs III: The Mothership	Released: June 13, 2000; Label: Koch; Format: CD, cassette, LP	45	13	2	—	
Mo Thugs IV: The Movement	Released: June 10, 2003; Label: Riviera Entertainment; Format: CD, digital download	—	25	17	—	
"—" denotes items which were not released in that country or failed to chart.

== Singles ==
List of singles as lead artist, with selected chart positions, showing year released and album name
Title	Year	Peak chart positions					Certifications	Albums
Title	Year	US	US HH/R&B	US Rap	US Rhythmic	NZ	Certifications	Albums
"Thug Devotion"	1996	—	—	—	30	1	RMNZ: Platinum	Family Scriptures
"Take Your Time"	1997	—	—	—	—	—		Family Scriptures
"All Good"	1998	—	—	—	21	15	RMNZ: Gold	Family Reunion
"Ghetto Cowboy" (featuring Bone Thugs-n-Harmony)	1998	15	14	1	31	—	RIAA: Gold; RMNZ: Gold	Family Reunion
"This Ain't Livin'"	2000	—	—	—	—	—		The Mothership
"All Life Long"	2003	—	83	—	—	—		The Movement
"—" denotes items which were not released in that country or failed to chart.

== See also ==
- Layzie Bone discography
- Krayzie Bone discography
- Bone Thugs-n-Harmony discography
