= A New Breed of Female =

Studio album by II Tru
- Released: September 9, 1997
- Recorded: 1996–97
- Studio: Private Island Trax (Los Angeles, CA)
- Genre: Hip hop
- Length: 51:08
- Label: Mo Thugs; Relativity
- Producer: Archie Blaine; Krayzie Bone

Brina chronology
A New Breed of Female (1997)	Diamond in the Rough (2000)

Singles from A New Breed of Female
- 1. "Ballers Flossin" Released: 1997

Professional ratings
Review scores
Source	Rating
AllMusic	2/5 stars
The Source	3/5 stars

A New Breed of Female is the only studio album by American hip hop group II Tru. It was released on September 9, 1997, via Mo Thugs/Relativity Records. The recording sessions took place at Private Island Trax, in Los Angeles. The production was primarily handled by Archie Blaine, as well as Krayzie Bone, who served as executive producer with Layzie Bone. It features guest appearances from fellow Mo Thugs members Ken Dawg, Tombstone and Sin of the Graveyard Shift, Flesh-n-Bone, Layzie Bone and Krayzie Bone.

The album failed to live up to the expectations provided by the success of Bone Thugs-N-Harmony and the platinum-selling Family Scriptures. It peaked at number 194 on the Billboard 200, dropping off the chart after only one week, and number 49 on the Top R&B/Hip-Hop Albums, dropping off after four weeks.

Along with a single, a music video was released for "Ballers Flossin", though it failed to make it to the Billboard charts.

== Background ==
Composed of female rappers Belinda "Jhaz" Wallace and Cabrina "Brina" Wilson, II Tru were discovered by fellow Cleveland natives Bone Thugs-n-Harmony, who in turn invited the duo to join their newly formed collective, Mo Thugs Family. They made their debut on Mo Thugs' first album Family Scriptures, appearing on three songs. After the success of the album, Mo Thugs founders Krayzie Bone and Layzie Bone gave both II Tru and the Poetic Hustla'z a chance to record an album. A New Breed of Female was the first studio album released from the Mo Thugs collective when it was released on September 9, 1997.

== Track listing ==
No.	Title	Writer(s)	Producer(s)	Length
1.	"New Breed of Female" (Acapella)			0:59
2.	"New Breed of Female"	Belinda Wallace; Cabrina Wilson; Archie Blaine	Archie Blaine	4:41
3.	"Are You Ready" (Skit)			0:22
4.	"Are You Ready"	Wallace; Wilson; Blaine	Archie Blaine	4:16
5.	"Ballers Flossin"	Wallace; Wilson; Blaine	Archie Blaine	5:04
6.	"Shyste"	Wallace; Wilson; Blaine	Archie Blaine	4:18
7.	"Promises" (Skit)			0:47
8.	"Promises"	Wallace; Wilson; Blaine	Archie Blaine	4:43
9.	"So High" (featuring Layzie Bone and Krayzie Bone)	Wallace; Wilson; Steven Howse; Anthony Henderson	Krayzie Bone	4:30
10.	"I Got Yo Back" (featuring Tombstone and Sin)	Wallace; Wilson; Paul O'Neil; Blaine	Archie Blaine	4:39
11.	"Back Door"	Wallace; Wilson; Blaine	Archie Blaine	4:10
12.	"Two Hits and Pass" (featuring Tombstone, Sin, Ken Dawg and Flesh-n-Bone)	Wallace; Wilson; O'Neil; Actavius Mills; Kendon Anthony; Stanley Howse; Blaine	Archie Blaine	3:39
13.	"Summer Time" (featuring Ken Dawg)	Wallace; Wilson; Anthony; Henderson	Krayzie Bone	3:22
14.	"Before I Die"	Wallace; Wilson; Blaine	Archie Blaine	1:52
15.	"Mothers Reminisce"	Wallace; Wilson; Blaine	Archie Blaine	3:46
Total length:				51:08

== Personnel ==
- Belinda "Jhaz" Wallace – main artist
- Cabrina "Brina" Wilson – main artist
- Anthony "Krayzie Bone" Henderson – featured artist (track 9), producer (tracks: 9, 13), executive producer
- Steven "Layzie Bone" Howse – featured artist (track 9), executive producer
- Paul "Tombstone" O'Neil – featured artist (tracks: 10, 12)
- Actavius "Sin" Mills – featured artist (tracks: 10, 12)
- Kendon "Ken Dawg" Anthony – featured artist (tracks: 12, 13)
- Stanley "Flesh-n-Bone" Howse – featured artist (track 12)
- Romeo Antonio – bass (tracks: 4, 8, 10, 13, 15), guitars (tracks: 4, 8, 13, 15)
- Jimmy Zavala – saxophone (tracks: 5, 15), flute (tracks: 10, 15)
- Hayes Branham – backing vocals (track 5)
- Mike Smooth – bass & guitar (track 6)
- Phat Vocals – chorus (track 13)
- Earl Wagner – backing vocals (track 15)
- Archie Blaine – producer (tracks: 2, 4–6, 8, 10–12, 14, 15)
- Jeff Shirley – recording, mixing
- Rod Mendoza – assistant recording
- Steve Durkee – assistant mixing
- David Bett – art direction
- Randy Ronquillo – design
- Peter Dokus – photography
- Steve Lobel – A&R

== Charts ==
Chart (1997)	Peak position
US Billboard 200	194
US Top R&B Albums (Billboard)	49
US Top Heatseekers (Billboard)	14
