= Bone Brothers (disambiguation) =

Bone Brothers and similar can mean:

- Bone Brothers, a USA music group
- Bone Brothers (album), a music album which they released
- Bone Brothers 2, the second release by the Bone Thugs-N-Harmony side project made up of Layzie Bone and former member Bizzy Bone
- Bone Brothers 3, their third, independently released album
