= Damon Elliott =

American musician, singer-songwriter, and record producer (born 1973)

- Also known as: Buck 22; NomaD
- Born: Damon William Elliott; March 21, 1973 (age 53); Beverly Hills, California, U.S.
- Genres: Hip hop; R&B; pop; pop rock; gospel; country; pop punk; hick hop; rock; reggae
- Occupations: Record producer; singer; songwriter; entrepreneur; musician
- Years active: 1996–present
- Labels: Confidential; Damon Elliott Music Group; AMBLVD

Damon William Elliott (born March 21, 1973) is an American record producer, songwriter and composer. Throughout his career he has worked with various artists spanning across hip hop, R&B, pop, pop rock, gospel, reggae and country. He also produced the Academy Award-nominated song "Applause" from the 2022 film Tell It Like a Woman. Elliott is the son of Dionne Warwick and Bill Elliott.

== Career ==
Elliott's first production project credits include Bone Thugs-n-Harmony member Flesh-n-Bone (1996). Other credits include work with Mya, Destiny's Child (including Beyonce's, Kelly Rowland's and Michelle Williams's solo projects), P!nk, Jessica Simpson, Macy Gray, Athena Cage, Solange Knowles, Keyshia Cole, Kelis, Brooke Allison, Brooke Hogan, Yasmeen Sulieman, rappers Layzie Bone, Yukmouth, Sticky Fingaz, Ol' Dirty Bastard, and former boxing champion Mike Tyson. He has written and produced theme songs for the television shows Holly's World, Kendra on Top and The Lylas. As a singer, Elliott contributed to N-Tyce, Tina Harris and Beat Funktion. He co-wrote "Blow Me" and "Catwalk" for American entrepreneur Jeffree Star.

Since 2014, with the support of Billy Ray Cyrus, Elliott began releasing hick-hop songs using stage name Buck 22. The two released a song "Achy Breaky 2", which peaked at number 80 on the Billboard Hot 100.

He is the founder/CEO of The Damon Elliott Music Group, and the founder and president of both Confidential Records and Kind Music Group.

== Personal life ==
Elliott was born on March 21, 1973, to Dionne Warwick and Bill Elliott. He has one brother named David Elliott. Whitney Houston was his first cousin once removed and opera singer Leontyne Price is another cousin. He is the nephew of singer Dee Dee Warwick, Dionne's sister.

== Discography ==
=== Production discography ===
Year	Song	Artist(s)	Album	Notes
1996	"Prayer Intro"	Flesh-n-Bone	T.H.U.G.S. (Trues Humbly United Gatherin' Souls)	N/A
1996	"T.H.U.G.S."	Flesh-n-Bone, Ms. Chaz, Damon Elliott	T.H.U.G.S. (Trues Humbly United Gatherin' Souls)	N/A
1996	"Northcoast"	Flesh-n-Bone, Layzie Bone, Tiarra, Damon Elliott	T.H.U.G.S. (Trues Humbly United Gatherin' Souls)	prod. w/ Teddy Harmon
1996	"The Silence Isn't Over"	Flesh-n-Bone	T.H.U.G.S. (Trues Humbly United Gatherin' Souls)	N/A
1996	"51/50 Skit"	Flesh-n-Bone	T.H.U.G.S. (Trues Humbly United Gatherin' Souls)	N/A
1996	"Mystic Spirits"	Flesh-n-Bone	T.H.U.G.S. (Trues Humbly United Gatherin' Souls)	prod. w/ Teddy Harmon
1996	"Tha Killin Skit"	Flesh-n-Bone	T.H.U.G.S. (Trues Humbly United Gatherin' Souls)	N/A
1996	"Live Soil"	Flesh-n-Bone	T.H.U.G.S. (Trues Humbly United Gatherin' Souls)	N/A
1996	"Empty the Clip"	Flesh-n-Bone, Afta Maff	T.H.U.G.S. (Trues Humbly United Gatherin' Souls)	prod. w/ Teddy Harmon
1998	"Riot"	Flesh-n-Bone	Family Scriptures Chapter II: Family Reunion	N/A
1998	"War"	Bone Thugs-n-Harmony, Henry Rollins, Tom Morello, Flea	Small Soldiers (Music from the Motion Picture)	N/A
1998	"What the World Needs Now Is Love"	Dionne Warwick, Big Daddy Kane, Bobby Brown, Coolio, Flesh-n-Bone, Horace Brown, Kurupt, Mechalie Jamison, Mic Geronimo, Mike City, Ray J, Royal Flush, Tony Grant, Tyrese, Veronica	N/A	N/A
2000	"Again & Again"	Mya	Fear of Flying	vocal prod. w/ Mya; prod. by BAG & Arnthor
2000	"If I Can Go Back"	Flesh-n-Bone	Mo Thugs III: The Mothership	N/A
2000	"Way Back"	Flesh-n-Bone, Layzie Bone, Ms. Chaz	5th Dog Let Loose	N/A
2000	"If You Could See"	Flesh-n-Bone, Layzie Bone, Wish Bone	5th Dog Let Loose	N/A
2000	"Word to the Wise"	Flesh-n-Bone	5th Dog Let Loose	N/A
2000	"The Master"	Flesh-n-Bone	5th Dog Let Loose	N/A
2000	"Say a Little Prayer"	Flesh-n-Bone	5th Dog Let Loose	N/A
2000	"Havin' a Ball"	Flesh-n-Bone	5th Dog Let Loose	N/A
2000	"Kurupted Flesh"	Flesh-n-Bone, Kurupt	5th Dog Let Loose	N/A
2000	"Come Fuck with Me"	Flesh-n-Bone	5th Dog Let Loose	N/A
2000	"No Other Like My Kind"	Flesh-n-Bone	5th Dog Let Loose	N/A
2000	"Silent Night"	Flesh-n-Bone, B.G. Knocc Out, Damon Elliott	5th Dog Let Loose	N/A
2001	"What If I Was White"	Sticky Fingaz, Eminem	Music From the Motion Picture Down to Earth and [Black Trash] The Autobiography of Kirk Jones	N/A
2001	"Smoke On"	Layzie Bone	Thug by Nature	N/A
2001	"Clap Yo Hands"	Yukmouth	Thug Lord: The New Testament	N/A
2001	"Sexy Daddy"	Destiny's Child	Survivor	prod. w/ Beyonce
2001	"Perfect Chemistry"	Brooke Allison	Brooke Allison	prod. w/ Michael Blakey
2001	"Poppin' Up"	Yasmeen Sulieman	Music From the Motion Picture Two Can Play That Game	N/A
2001	"White Christmas"	Destiny's Child	8 Days of Christmas	prod. w/ Beyonce
2001	"Platinum Bells"	Destiny's Child	8 Days of Christmas	prod. w/ Beyonce
2001	"M!ssundaztood"	P!nk	Missundaztood	prod. w/ Linda Perry
2001	"Respect"	P!nk	Missundaztood	prod. w/ Linda Perry
2001	"Gone to California"	P!nk	Missundaztood	prod. w/ Linda Perry
2001	"My Vietnam"	P!nk	Missundaztood	prod. w/ Linda Perry
2001	"Until You Come Back to Me"	Athena Cage	The Art of a Woman	N/A
2001	"Make U Wanna"	Athena Cage	The Art of a Woman	N/A
2001	"He Changed His Mind"	Athena Cage	The Art of a Woman	N/A
2002	"Better Place (9.11)"	Michelle Williams	Heart to Yours	N/A
2002	"Thinking About You"	Solange Knowles, Murphy Lee	Music from the Motion Picture Scooby-Doo and Solo Star	prod. w/ Beyonce
2002	"Hey Goldmember"	Beyonce, Devin the Dude, Solange Knowles	Music from the Motion Picture Austin Powers in Goldmember	N/A
2002	"(Love Lives In) Strange Places"	Kelly Rowland	Simply Deep	prod. w/ Billy Mann
2002	"Beyond Imagination"	Kelly Rowland	Simply Deep	prod. w/ Solange Knowles
2002	"Feelin' You (Part II)"	Solange Knowles, N.O.R.E.	Solo Star	prod. w/ Solange Knowles & Mark Penn
2002	"Just Like You"	Solange Knowles	Solo Star	prod. w/ Beyonce
2003	"Get Up"	Keyshia Cole	Biker Boyz (Music From the Motion Picture)	N/A
2003	"Whatever Bitch"	Mya	Moodring	prod. w/ Mya
2003	"Take a Picture"	Mya	Moodring	add. prod. by Mya & Ron Fair
2003	"Free Fallin'"	Mya	Moodring	co-prod. by Mya & Ron Fair
2003	"My Way Home"	Jessica Simpson	In This Skin	N/A
2003	"Loving You"	Jessica Simpson	In This Skin	N/A
2003	"Fever"	Beyonce	Music From the Motion Picture The Fighting Temptations	prod. w/ Beyonce
2003	"Love Song"	P!nk	Try This	N/A
2004	"Walk This Way"	Macy Gray	The Very Best of Macy Gray	N/A
2005	"Can't Take My Eyes Off You"	Jamie Kennedy	Son of the Mask (Original Motion Picture Soundtrack)	N/A
2005	"Love"	Keyshia Cole	The Way It Is	add. prod. w/ Ron Fair & Tal Herzberg; prod. by Gregory G. Curtis
2005	"ODB, Don't Go Breaking My Heart"	Ol' Dirty Bastard, Macy Gray	A Son Unique	N/A
2005	"How Ya Feelin'"	Ol' Dirty Bastard	A Son Unique	N/A
2006	"Appreciate Me"	Kelis	Kelis Was Here	co-prod. by Teddy Harmon
2006	"Have a Nice Day"	Kelis	Kelis Was Here	N/A
2006	"Low Rider Jeans"	Brooke Hogan	Undiscovered	N/A
2006	"Walk on By"	Dionne Warwick, Gloria Estefan	My Friends & Me	co-prod. by Teddy Harmon
2006	"Message to Michael"	Dionne Warwick, Cyndi Lauper	My Friends & Me	co-prod. by Teddy Harmon
2006	"Close to You"	Dionne Warwick, Mya	My Friends & Me	co-prod. by Teddy Harmon
2006	"I'll Never Love This Way Again"	Dionne Warwick, Gladys Knight	My Friends & Me	co-prod. by Teddy Harmon
2006	"Raindrops Keep Fallin' on My Head"	Dionne Warwick, Kelis	My Friends & Me	co-prod. by Teddy Harmon
2006	"Deja Vu"	Dionne Warwick	My Friends & Me	co-prod. by Teddy Harmon
2006	"I Say a Little Prayer"	Dionne Warwick, Reba McEntire	My Friends & Me	co-prod. by Teddy Harmon
2006	"Anyone Who Had a Heart"	Dionne Warwick, Wynonna Judd	My Friends & Me	co-prod. by Teddy Harmon
2006	"Then Came You"	Dionne Warwick, Lisa Tucker	My Friends & Me	co-prod. by Teddy Harmon
2006	"Wishin' and Hopin'"	Dionne Warwick, Olivia Newton-John	My Friends & Me	co-prod. by Teddy Harmon
2006	"Love Will Find a Way"	Dionne Warwick, Cheyenne Elliott	My Friends & Me	co-prod. by Teddy Harmon
2006	"The Windows of the World"	Dionne Warwick, Angie Stone, Chante Moore, Deborah Cox, Da Brat	My Friends & Me	co-prod. by Teddy Harmon
2006	"Do You Know the Way to San Jose"	Dionne Warwick, Celia Cruz	My Friends & Me	co-prod. by Teddy Harmon
2007	"Family First"	Whitney Houston, Cissy Houston, Dionne Warwick, Alex Warrick, Allysa Warrick, Barrance Warrick, Bobbi Kristina Brown, Brittney Warrick, Cheyenne Elliott, David Elliott, Deanna Warrick, Delia Warrick, Gary Houston, Kaelyn Elliott, Michael Houston, Pat Houston, Ray Watson, Rayah Houston	Music inspired by the film Tyler Perry's Daddy's Little Girls	prod. w/ Teddy Harmon; co-prod. by Carlos McKinney
2007	"AEIOU"	Macy Gray	Big	N/A
2008	"Battle Hymn of the Republic"	Dionne Warwick	Why We Sing	prod. w/ Percy Bady, BeBe Winans, Teddy Harmon, Gregory G. Curtis, Dionne Warwick
2008	"I'm Going Up"	Dionne Warwick, BeBe Winans	Why We Sing	prod. w/ Percy Bady, BeBe Winans, Teddy Harmon, Gregory G. Curtis, Dionne Warwick
2008	"With All My Heart"	Dionne Warwick	Why We Sing	prod. w/ Percy Bady, BeBe Winans, Teddy Harmon, Gregory G. Curtis, Dionne Warwick
2008	"Old Landmark"	Dionne Warwick	Why We Sing	prod. w/ Percy Bady, BeBe Winans, Teddy Harmon, Gregory G. Curtis, Dionne Warwick
2008	"The World Needs Jesus"	Dionne Warwick	Why We Sing	prod. w/ Percy Bady, BeBe Winans, Teddy Harmon, Gregory G. Curtis, Dionne Warwick
2008	"I Lift My Heart"	Dionne Warwick	Why We Sing	prod. w/ Percy Bady, BeBe Winans, Teddy Harmon, Gregory G. Curtis, Dionne Warwick
2008	"Jesus Loves Me"	Dionne Warwick	Why We Sing	prod. w/ Percy Bady, BeBe Winans, Teddy Harmon, Gregory G. Curtis, Dionne Warwick
2008	"Show Me the Way"	Dionne Warwick	Why We Sing	prod. w/ Percy Bady, BeBe Winans, Teddy Harmon, Gregory G. Curtis, Dionne Warwick
2008	"Why We Sing"	Dionne Warwick, Dee Dee Warwick	Why We Sing	prod. w/ Percy Bady, BeBe Winans, Teddy Harmon, Gregory G. Curtis, Dionne Warwick
2008	"Rise, Shine and Give God the Glory"	Dionne Warwick	Why We Sing	prod. w/ Percy Bady, BeBe Winans, Teddy Harmon, Gregory G. Curtis, Dionne Warwick
2008	"The Lord Is My Shepherd"	Dionne Warwick	Why We Sing	prod. w/ Percy Bady, BeBe Winans, Teddy Harmon, Gregory G. Curtis, Dionne Warwick
2008	"Seven"	Dionne Warwick, David Elliott	Why We Sing	prod. w/ Percy Bady, BeBe Winans, Teddy Harmon, Gregory G. Curtis, Dionne Warwick
2012	"One Way"	Tomorrows Bad Seeds	The Great Escape	N/A
2015	"Peace In This World"	Damon Elliott, Michael 'Micl Snr' Norman	N/A	co-prod. w/ Michael 'Micl Snr' Norman
2017	"If You Show Up"	Mike Tyson	N/A	N/A
2019	"Am I Dreaming"	Dionne Warwick, Musiq Soulchild	She's Back	prod. w/ Teddy Harmon & Musiq Soulchild
2019	"Tears Ago"	Dionne Warwick	She's Back	prod. w/ Teddy Harmon
2019	"What Color Is Love"	Dionne Warwick, Kenny Lattimore	She's Back	prod. w/ Teddy Harmon
2019	"How Do You Keep the Music Playing"	Dionne Warwick, Kevon Edmonds	She's Back	prod. w/ Teddy Harmon
2019	"Deja Vu"	Dionne Warwick, Krayzie Bone	She's Back	prod. w/ Teddy Harmon
2019	"Forever in My Heart"	Dionne Warwick, Brian McKnight	She's Back	prod. w/ Brian McKnight
2019	"Dream with No Love"	Dionne Warwick	She's Back	prod. w/ Teddy Harmon
2019	"We're In Love"	Dionne Warwick	She's Back	prod. w/ Teddy Harmon
2019	"You Really Started Something"	Dionne Warwick	She's Back	prod. w/ Teddy Harmon
2019	"Two Ships"	Dionne Warwick, Fiji	She's Back	vocal prod. w/ Fiji; prod. by Rob Shrock
2019	"Life Is Waiting"	Dionne Warwick	She's Back	vocal prod.; prod. by Brenda Russell
2019	"If I Want to"	Dionne Warwick	She's Back	prod. w/ Rob Shrock
2019	"We Need to Go Back"	Dionne Warwick, Jubilation Choir	She's Back	N/A
2019	"What a Fool Believes"	Dionne Warwick	She's Back	vocal prod.; prod. by Rob Shrock
2019	"What the World Needs Now (2019 Version)"	Dionne Warwick, Jubilation Choir	She's Back	N/A
2019	"Reach Out for Me"	Dionne Warwick	She's Back	prod. w/ Teddy Harmon
2019	"I Say a Little Prayer"	Dionne Warwick	She's Back	prod. w/ Teddy Harmon
2019	"(There's) Always Something There to Remind Me"	Dionne Warwick	She's Back	N/A
2019	"Aquarela do Brasil"	Dionne Warwick	She's Back	N/A
2019	"Be My Neighbour"	Dionne Warwick	She's Back	N/A
2019	"What the World Needs Now Is Love"	Dionne Warwick	She's Back	N/A
2019	"Do You Know the Way to San Jose"	Dionne Warwick	She's Back	prod. w/ Zane Giles
