= Tribulation (disambiguation) =

The Tribulation is a period of strife and judgement in Christian eschatology.

Tribulation or tribulations may also refer to:

- Tribulation (film), a 2000 thriller film
- Tribulation (band), a Swedish metal band
- Tribulation, a 1999 album by Dennis Brown
- Tribulation, a 2006 album by Don Carlos
- "Tribulations" (song), a 2005 song by LCD Soundsystem
- "Tribulation", instrumental from 666

== See also ==
- Trials & Tribulations (disambiguation)
