= Ghetto Cowboy =

Single by Mo Thugs Family featuring Bone Thugs-n-Harmony

from the album Chapter II: Family Reunion
- B-side: "Keep It Real"
- Released: November 3, 1998
- Recorded: 1998
- Studio: Private Island Trax (Los Angeles, CA)
- Genre: Midwest hip hop; country rap
- Length: 5:25
- Label: Relativity
- Songwriters: Anthony Henderson; Steven Howse; Kamilha Greer; Jimmy Lee Burke; Felecia Lindsay
- Producers: Krayzie Bone; Romeo Antonio (co.)

Mo Thugs singles chronology
"Thug Devotion" (1996)	"Ghetto Cowboy" (1998)	"All Good" (1998)

Music video
- "Thug Devotion" on YouTube

"Ghetto Cowboy" is the 2nd single by American hip hop collective Mo Thugs taken from their second studio album Chapter II: Family Reunion, released in 1998 via Mo Thugs/Relativity Records. It features contributions from Layzie Bone, Krayzie Bone, Felecia, Powder P, Thug Queen. Produced by Krayzie Bone with co-production by Romeo Antonio.

The single peaked at 15 on the Billboard Hot 100 while also reaching the top spot on the Hot Rap Singles chart. It was certified gold by the Recording Industry Association of America on December 17, 1998 for sales of 500,000 copies and also made it to No. 87 on the Billboard Year-End Hot 100 singles of 1999 as one of the most popular singles of the year.

== Track listing ==
1. "Ghetto Cowboy" (Album Version)
2. "Ghetto Cowboy" (Clean Album Version)
3. "Ghetto Cowboy" (Video Version)
4. "Ghetto Cowboy" (Instrumental)

== Personnel ==
- Anthony "Krayzie Bone" Henderson – vocals, producer, songwriter
- Steven "Layzie Bone" Howse – vocals, songwriter
- Felecia Lindsey – vocals, songwriter
- Kamilha "Thug Queen" Greer – vocals,songwriter
- Jimmy Lee Burke – vocals, songwriter
- Jimmy Zavala – harmonica
- Romeo Antonio – co-producer, assistant mixing engineer
- Mark "V" Myers – recording
- Howard Albert – mixing
- Ron Albert – mixing
- "Disco" Rick Taylor – assistant mixing engineer
- Juan Rosario – assistant mixing engineer

== Charts ==
=== Weekly charts ===
Chart (1998–1999)	Peak position
US Billboard Hot 100	15
US Hot R&B/Hip-Hop Songs (Billboard)	14
US Hot Rap Songs (Billboard)	1
US Rhythmic Airplay (Billboard)	31

=== Year-end charts ===
Chart (1999)	Position
US Billboard Hot 100	87

== Certifications ==
Region	Certification	Certified units/sales
New Zealand (RMNZ)	Gold	15,000^{‡}
United States (RIAA)	Gold	500,000^{^}
^{^} Shipments figures based on certification alone.^{‡} Sales+streaming figures based on certification alone.
