= The Lost Songs Vol. 3 =

Studio album by Outlawz
- Released: March 23, 2010
- Recorded: 1999–2009
- Genre: Gangsta rap; hardcore hip hop
- Length: 49:49
- Label: 1Nation Entertainment; Outlaw Recordz
- Producer: Outlawz (exec.)

Outlawz chronology
The Lost Songs Vol. 2 (2010)	The Lost Songs Vol. 3 (2010)	Killuminati 2K10 (2010)

The Lost Songs Vol. 3 is a digital album by Outlawz, released March 23, 2010 on Outlaw Recordz and 1Nation Entertainment.

== Track listing ==
No.	Title	Length
1.	"Watchin' Me" (Young Noble, Napoleon)	4:07
2.	"Strait Ryda" (EDIDON, Trae Tha Truth, Young Noble, Stormey Coleman)	4:18
3.	"On My Way" (Young Noble, Hussein Fatal, Danny Boy)	4:23
4.	"Ain't No Luv" (Stormey Coleman, Young Noble, Tek)	3:52
5.	"Wash Away" (Stormey Coleman, Young Noble & King Malachi)	4:03
6.	"Everything Is Yours" (Stormey Coleman, Young Noble, EDIDON & Lloyd)	4:13
7.	"Ball Cautiously" (Stormey Coleman, Young Noble, EDIDON & Bizzy Bone & Layzie Bone of Bone Brothers)	3:26
8.	"U Don't Hear Me" (EDIDON, Stormey Coleman & King Malachi)	5:22
9.	"It's Clear" (EDIDON, Young Noble, K. Kastro & King Malachi)	3:54
10.	"Make It Last" (Napoleon, Layzie Bone, EDIDON, Krayzie Bone, K. Kastro, Young Noble)	5:02
11.	"1Nation All-Stars" (Erick Sermon, Yukmouth, The Game, Stat Quo, Boo & Gotti, Buckshot, Hussein Fatal, Duce Poppy, Smif-n-Wessun, James Gotti, Young Noble)	7:09
