= Trials & Tribulations =

Trials & Tribulations may refer to:

== Music ==
- Trials & Tribulations (Ace Hood album) or the title song, 2013
- Trials & Tribulations (Poetic Hustla'z album) or the title song, 1997
- Trials & Tribulations, an album by Bizzy Bone, 2007
- "Trials & Tribulations", a song by Polo G from The Goat, 2020

== Other uses ==
- "Trials and Tribulations" (Fargo), a 2023 TV episode
- Phoenix Wright: Ace Attorney – Trials and Tribulations, a 2004 visual novel adventure video game

== See also ==
- Trials and Tribble-ations, a 1996 episode of Star Trek: Deep Space 9
