= Beat Funktion =

Swedish band

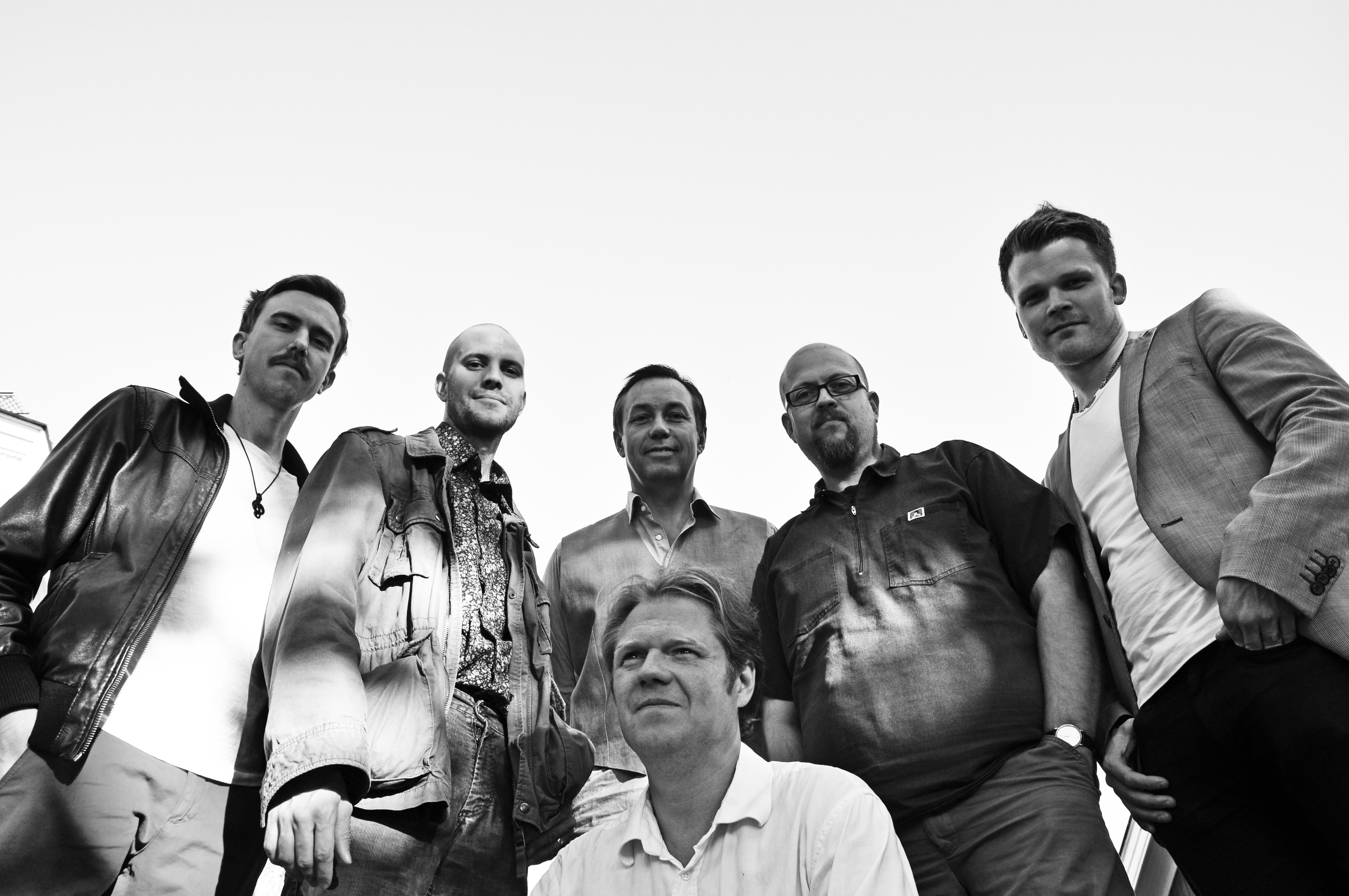
- Jon Eriksson, Daniel Lantz, Pal Johnson, Johan Öijen och Karl Olandersson. Sitting: Olle Thunström.

Background information
- Origin: Uppsala, Stockholm, Sweden
- Genres: Jazz, Funk, Soul, R&B, Disco, Afrobeat, Fusion
- Years active: 2007–present
- Labels: Do Music Records; P-Vine
- Members: Karl Olandersson; Olle Thunström; Johan Öijen; Daniel Lantz; Pal Johnson; Jon Eriksson
- Website: www.beatfunktion.se

Beat Funktion is a Swedish jazz fusion band. The band's music is a mix of jazz, funk, R&B, disco, soul and afro-beat, fundamentally instrumental but occasionally with vocal guest performers. The band consists of the six members Karl Olandersson on trumpet, Olle Thunstrom on tenor sax, Johan Oijen on electric guitar, Daniel Lantz on keyboards, Pal Johnson on electric bass and Jon Eriksson on drums. Daniel Lantz writes the majority of the band's music.

The band has released eight studio albums, six of which have received international acclaim outside of the band's native Sweden and high list placements on radio charts in the United States and Canada. The group's third album Voodooland was licensed to Japanese label P-Vine and also hit #1 on the American CMJ Jazz Charts for three consecutive weeks, becoming the ninth most played jazz album on those charts in 2014. The band was signed to management by Las Vegas-based agency Eggman Global Artists and consequently toured the US between Chicago and Los Angeles in the fall of 2014. Their fourth album Mandy's Secret became a first collaboration with rock producer Mats Björke, known from rock group Mando Diao. It hit #1 on the Canadian Earshot Radio Chart, #2 on the American charts where it lingered for 21 weeks. Even their fifth album Olympus hit #1 on the Canadian charts, hit #2 on the American charts and presented guest artists South African singer Sani Gamedze and Swedish singer Rebecca Laakso, as well as American rapper Damon Elliott (Dionne Warwick's son, Grammy-winning performer and producer of pop artists Beyoncé, Gwen Stefani, Pink a o). Olympus, a concept album based on Greek mythology, became the 12th most played jazz album on the CMJ Jazz Charts in 2015 and was nominated in four categories for the Scandinavian Soul Music Awards 2016: Best Band, Best Album, Best Producers (Daniel Lantz & Mats Bjorke) and Best Newcomer.

The band's sixth album Green Man, the third collaboration with Mats Bjorke, saw a Swedish release in the fall of 2016 and another in the US, Canada and the rest of the world in the spring of 2017, and featured several guest vocalists: Viktoria Tolstoy, Jasmine Kara, Damon Elliott, Claes Janson, Matilda Gratte (Swedish Idol 2014), Adée, Alicia Olatuja and Deodato Siquir. Three instrumentals that never fit onto the album were released as separate digital singles in the spring of 2017.

After a two-year hiatus, the band released their seventh album Roots in the fall of 2019 in connection with a release tour through Sweden, Austria and Germany. The album was released as limited vinyl edition, is completely instrumental and is the fourth collaboration with Mats Björke.

In 2020, the band released a series of live concert recordings from previous tours: Live At The Red Horn District (ft. Natascha Flamisch), Live At The Baked Potato, Live At Fasching '14, Live At Nefertiti, Live At Katalin '16.

In 2023, the band released their eighth studio album titled Skywards, an all instrumental effort produced by Daniel Lantz.

== Discography ==
=== Studio albums ===
- The Plunge (2010)
- Moon Town (2013) (US #4)
- Voodooland (2014) (US #1, Canada #1)
- Mandy's Secret (2014) (US #2, Canada #1)
- Olympus (2015) (US #2, Canada #1)
- Green Man (2016/2017)
- Roots (2019)
- Skywards (2023)

=== Live albums ===
- Live At The Red Horn District (ft. Natascha Flamisch) (2019) (2020)
- Live At The Baked Potato '14 (2021) (US #4)
- Live At Fasching '14 (2021)
- Live At Nefertiti (2021)
- Live At Katalin '16 (2021)

=== Singles ===
- "Maja" (2017)
- "Hayweather" (2017)
- "Rio" (2017)
- "Roots" (2019)
- "Pugnose" (2019)
- "Leave Me" (2019)
