= Checks Thugs and Rock n Roll =

Checks, Thugs and Rock N Roll

Studio album by DMC
- Released: March 14, 2006
- Recorded: 2004–06
- Genre: Pop rap; rap rock
- Length: 57:43
- Label: Romen Mpire Records; Rags 2 Riches Records
- Producer: DMC; Romeo Antonio; DJ Lethal; Kid Rock; Shatek King; the Platinum Brothers

Singles from Checks, Thugs and Rock N Roll
- 1. "Lovey Dovey" Released: February 14, 2006

Checks Thugs and Rock n Roll is the debut solo studio album by American musician Darryl "D.M.C." McDaniels from hip hop group Run-DMC. It was released on March 14, 2006, through Romen Mpire/Rags 2 Riches Records. He was inspired to put out this album when, at age 35, he found out he was adopted.

== Critical reception ==
Professional ratings
Review scores
Source	Rating
AllMusic	2/5 stars
RapReviews	5/10
Vibe	2/5 marks

AllMusic's David Jeffries felt the record "sounds like the most contrived rock and rap blends that major-label execs declared the future of music back in the mid-'90s, with touches of P.M. Dawn at their most woeful and indulgent", praising tracks like "Lovey Dovey" and "Machine Gun" for allowing DMC and his collaborators to "just hang out and have some fun" but criticized "Watchtower" and "Just Like Me" for its poor sample interpolations and "thin, maudlin lyrics all drowning in excess." He concluded that: "[T]he best thing you can say about this letdown is that DMC's commitment to changing the world and opening eyes is admirable and attractive, but sadly, his skills are blunted and he's not up to the challenge." Steve 'Flash' Juon of RapReviews felt the album paled in comparison to Rev Run's Distortion, criticizing the runtime throughout the track listing, DMC's personality being "replaced by insecurity and self-doubt", and for giving a disappointing performance, concluding that: "Checks Thugs and Rock N Roll is often compelling, but for all the wrong reasons - it's the trainwreck you can't look away from no matter how hard you try. Most listeners will feel their $15 would have been better spent donating to spasmodic dysphonia research that would help others like D rather than listening to a painful album that just makes you yearn for what was and will never ever be again."

== Track listing ==
No.	Title	Writer(s)	Length
1.	"Watchtower" (featuring Elliot Easton and Romeo Antonio and Josh Todd)	Robert Allen Zimmerman	3:54
2.	"Freaky Chick"	Darryl Matthews McDaniels; Romeo Antonio	3:48
3.	"Just Like Me" (featuring Sarah McLachlan)	McDaniels; Harry Chapin; Sandra Chapin	4:52
4.	"Lovey Dovey" (featuring Doug E. Fresh)	McDaniels; Douglas Davis; Lyle; J. Russell; Stanton	4:56
5.	"Find My Way" (featuring Kid Rock)	McDaniels; Robert James Ritchie	4:58
6.	"Machine Gun" (featuring Tal B. and Romeo Antonio and Gary Dourdan)	McDaniels; Gary Dourdan; Romeo Antonio	4:52
7.	"Cold" (featuring Ms. Jade and Sonny Black)	Sheer	4:12
8.	"What's Wrong" (featuring Napolean)	McDaniels; Mutah Beale; Leor Dimant	3:45
9.	"Cadillac Cars"	Zimmerman	4:39
10.	"Only God Knows"	McDaniels; Dimant; John Otto	4:18
11.	"Come 2Gether" (featuring Rev Run)	McDaniels	4:14
12.	"Sucka Sucka"	McDaniels; Romeo Antonio; Jason Mizell	4:19
13.	"Goodbye" (featuring Lil Mizzo)	McDaniels; M. Miller; Beale; Adam Maurice Gibbs; Michael A. Chesser	4:56
Total length:			57:43

== Personnel ==
- Drums: Joey Kramer, Romeo Antonio, Ashwin Sood
- Drum Programming: Romeo Antonio
- Bass: Tom Hamilton, Romeo Antonio
- Guitars: Romeo Antonio, Elliot Easton, Billy Roues
- Keyboards: Romeo Antonio
- Multi-Instruments: Kid Rock, Romeo Antonio
- DJ: Kid Rock
- Vocals: Sonny Black, Gary Dourdan, Romeo Antonio, Doug E. Fresh, Kid Rock
- Programming: Shatek King
- Orchestration, Conducting: Romeo Antonio
- Violin: Anna Stafford
- Executive Producers: Romeo Antonio, DMC, Erik Blam
- Producers: Romeo Antonio, DMC, Kid Rock, DJ Lethal, Shatek King
- Engineer: Romeo Antonio, Jam Master Jay
- Mixing: Romeo Antonio, Jean-Marie Horvat, Paul McKenna, Ron Saint Germain, Ashwin Sood
- Mastering: Nancy Matter

== Charts ==
Chart (2006)	Peak position
US Top R&B/Hip-Hop Albums (Billboard)	87
