= Mo Thugs III: The Mothership =

Studio album by Mo Thugs
- Released: June 27, 2000
- Recorded: 1999–2000
- Genre: Hip hop; gangsta rap
- Length: 1:12:41
- Label: Koch
- Producer: Damon Elliott; Darren Vegas; Layzie Bone; Mike Smoov; Rich E; Thin C

Mo Thugs chronology
Chapter II: Family Reunion (1998)	Mo Thugs III: The Mothership (2000)	The Movement (2003)

Professional ratings
Review scores
Source	Rating
AllMusic	2/5 stars
The New Rolling Stone Album Guide	1.5/5 stars
USA Today	2.5/4 stars

Mo Thugs III: The Mothership is the third studio album by American hip hop collective Mo Thugs. It was released on June 27, 2000 via Koch Records. Production was handled by Thin C., Rich E., Mike Smoov, Darren Vegas, Damon Elliott, and Layzie Bone, who also served as executive producer. The album peaked at number 45 on the Billboard 200, number 13 on the Top R&B/Hip-Hop Albums and number 2 on the Independent Albums in the United States.

This album saw the departure of many Mo Thug artists including Souljah Boy, Graveyard Shift, Poetic Hustla'z, II Tru, MT5, & Powder. Krayzie Bone, who was one of the founding members of the Mo Thugs record label, also did not participate on this project. Most fans consider this album a disappointment compared to previous Mo Thugs albums due to the massive change of artists signed to the label as well as the absence of Krayzie Bone. The album spawned a single, "This Ain't Livin'" by Layzie Bone and featured Felecia, which was a minor success.

== Track listing ==
No.	Title	Writer(s)	Producer(s)	Length
1.	"Who Forgot About It" (performed by Desperidos)	Steven Howse; Antyone Redd; Bomani Foraji; Kendon Anthony; Talvin Wells; Amefika Williams	Thin C.	4:34
2.	"Seldom Seen" (performed by Seldom Seen, Layzie Bone and TN-Tee)	Earnest J. Porter; Jevan Norton; Steven Howse; Wells	Thin C.	3:36
3.	"Last Laugh" (performed by Freaky-G and Emmortal Thugs)	Charles Whiteside Jr.; Danny Hudson; Jerome Davis; Jesse Matthews; Paul Hardwick; Steward Howse; Richard E. Harris Jr.	Rich E.	4:54
4.	"The Backyard" (performed by J-Bone and Layzie Bone)	Jeremy Howse; Steven Howse; Harris Jr.	Rich E.	4:36
5.	"Gunline" (performed by Desperidos and Black Hole Of Watts)	Steven Howse; Redd; Foraji; Anthony; Wells; Williams; Andrew Simpson; Orie G. Windfield; Shonte Henderson; Michael Bell	Mike Smoov	4:58
6.	"Wanna Be Ballers" (performed by Potion)	Nicole Stewart; Annette Stewart; Ebonie Lane	Rich E.	3:51
7.	"It Don't Stop" (performed by Ken Dawg)	Anthony; Darren Hubbard	Darren Vegas	4:39
8.	"U Don't Want None" (performed by Emmortal Thugs, Capone and Freaky-G)	Hudson; Davis; Matthews; Hardwick; Steward Howse; Shawn Goines; Whiteside Jr.; Williams	Thin C.	4:24
9.	"This Ain't Livin'" (performed by Layzie Bone and Felecia)	Joe Sample; Will Jennings	Darren Vegas	4:27
10.	"Did He Really Wanna?" (performed by Desperidos)	Steven Howse; Redd; Foraji; Anthony; Wells; Harris Jr.	Rich E.	5:40
11.	"Total Kaos" (performed by Desperidos)	Steven Howse; Redd; Foraji; Anthony; Wells; Harris Jr.	Thin C.	4:22
12.	"Tighten up Your Operation" (performed by Desperidos)	Steven Howse; Redd; Foraji; Anthony; Wells; Harris Jr.	Thin C.	4:46
13.	"Down from the Start" (performed by Black Hole Of Watts)	Simpson; Redd; Windfield; Henderson	Mike Smoov	3:49
14.	"2 the Playaz" (performed by Skant Bone and Felecia)	Felecia Lindsey; Bell; Henderson	Mike Smoov	6:00
15.	"If I Can Go Back" (performed by Flesh-n-Bone)	Stanley Howse; Damon Elliott	Damon Elliott	3:37
16.	"Everything Green" (performed by Layzie Bone)	Steven Howse; Harris Jr.	Rich E.; Layzie Bone	4:29
Total length:				1:12:41

== Charts ==
Chart (2000)	Peak position
US Billboard 200	45
US Top R&B/Hip-Hop Albums (Billboard)	13
US Independent Albums (Billboard)	2
