= Thug Devotion =

Single by Mo Thugs

from the album Family Scriptures
- Released: 1996
- Recorded: August 1996
- Studio: Private Island Trax (Los Angeles, CA)
- Genre: Hip hop
- Length: 4:35
- Label: Mo Thugs; Relativity
- Songwriter(s): Anthony Henderson; Steven Howse; Kendon Anthony; Willy Lyons; Rebecca Forsha; Kimberly Cromartie; Niko Williams; Bobby Jones; Philip Bailey; Maurice White
- Producer(s): Bobby Jones

Mo Thugs singles chronology
"Thug Devotion" (1996)	"Ghetto Cowboy" (1998)

Music video
- "Thug Devotion" on YouTube

"Thug Devotion" is the lead single by American hip hop collective Mo Thugs taken from their debut studio album Family Scriptures, released in 1996 via Mo Thugs/Relativity Records. Recording sessions took place at Private Island Trax in Los Angeles. It features contributions from Layzie Bone, Krayzie Bone, Tré, Ken Dawg and Souljah Boy. Produced by Bobby Jones, it contains replayed elements from Earth, Wind & Fire's song "Devotion" written by Philip Bailey and Maurice White.

The single topped the Official New Zealand Music Chart and was certified Platibum by the Recording Industry Association of New Zealand.

== Charts ==
Chart (1996)	Peak position
New Zealand (Recorded Music NZ)	1
US Rhythmic (Billboard)	30

== Certifications ==
Region	Certification	Certified units/sales
New Zealand (RMNZ)	Platinum	10,000^{*}
^{*} Sales figures based on certification alone.

== See also ==
- List of number-one singles from the 1990s (New Zealand)
