= II Tru =

American hip hop group

- Origin: Cleveland, Ohio, USA
- Genre: Hip Hop
- Years active: 1993–1998, 2014–present
- Label: Mo Thugs / Relativity
- Members: Brina; Jhaz; Archie Blaine (producer)

II Tru is an American female rap duo composed of Cleveland natives Brina and Jhaz. They were discovered by fellow Cleveland group Bone Thugs-n-Harmony and subsequently joined the group's collective known as the Mo Thugs Family.

II Tru first appeared on Mo Thugs first album Family Scriptures, appearing on "Ghetto Bluez", "Welcome To My World" and "Family Scriptures". The album was a huge success, making it to No. 2 on the Billboard 200 and earning a platinum certification for sales of one million copies. Following the success of Family Scriptures, II Tru recorded and released their debut album, A New Breed of Female on September 9, 1997. The album, however, failed to match the success of Family Scriptures and quickly fell off the Billboard charts after peaking at 194 on the Billboard 200. II Tru's last appearance came on Mo Thugs' follow-up album, Chapter II: Family Reunion on the track entitled "Pimpin' Ain't Easy". After Chapter II, the duo left Mo Thugs and did not appear on Mo Thugs III: The Mothership or The Movement.

II Tru were working on a new independent album, aiming for a late 2014/early 2015 release, but it remains unreleased.

In 2026, with help from Beyond the Harmony, II Tru released "II Good II Be Tru" featuring unreleased songs from 1992 - 1997.

== Discography ==
Year	Title	Chart positions	
Year	Title	U.S.	U.S. R&B
1997	A New Breed of Female: Released: September 9, 1997; Label: Relativity	194	49
2026	II Good II Be Tru: Released: August 7, 2026; Label: Independent	-	-
