= Trials & Tribulations (Poetic Hustla'z album) =

Studio album by Poetic Hustla'z
- Released: November 11, 1997
- Recorded: 1996–97
- Genre: Midwest hip hop; gangsta rap
- Length: 48:38
- Label: Mo Thugs; Relativity
- Producer: Layzie Bone (exec.); Krayzie Bone (also exec.); Poetic Hustla'z; Romeo Antonio; Touch Tone

Singles from Trials & Tribulations
- 1. "Day & Night" Released: May 26, 1998

Trials & Tribulations is the first and only studio album by American hip hop group Poetic Hustla'z. It was released on November 11, 1997, via Mo Thugs/Relativity Records. Production was handled by Romeo Antonio, Touch Tone, Poetic Hustla'z, and Krayzie Bone, who also served as executive producer together with Layzie Bone. It features guest appearances from Flesh-n-Bone, Krayzie Bone, Layzie Bone, Potion and Wish Bone. The album peaked at number 96 on the US Billboard Top R&B/Hip-Hop Albums chart.

Along with singles, music videos were released for two songs: "Trials & Tribulations" and "Day & Night" featuring Layzie Bone. The video for Trials & Tribulations features a cameo appearance by Bizzy Bone and Flesh-n-Bone. The album is unavailable on iTunes.

== Critical reception ==
Professional ratings
Review scores
| Source | Rating |
|---|---|
| AllMusic | 4/5 stars |
| The Source | 3/5 stars |

Soren Baker, in his review for The Source, wrote: "If Bone Thugs-n-Harmony represent major league baseball's All-Star cast, their offshoot group, Poetic Hustla'z are entrenched somewhere in the upper minor leagues." The journalist commended the album for its beats, but criticized lyrics, which he described as "rife with contradictions".

== Track listing ==
| No. | Title | Writer(s) | Producer(s) | Length |
|---|---|---|---|---|
| 1. | "Intro & Insanity" (featuring Flesh-n-Bone) | Anthony Chappell; Richard Drake; Stanley Howse; Anthony Henderson | Krayzie Bone | 5:02 |
| 2. | "Don't Trust a Bitch" | Chappell; Drake | Poetic Hustla'z | 4:23 |
| 3. | "Day & Night" (featuring Layzie Bone and Dominique) | Chappell; Drake; Steven Howse | Romeo Antonio; Touch Tone (co.) | 4:21 |
| 4. | "Parlay With a Hustla" (featuring Wish Bone) | Chappell; Drake; Charles Scruggs | Touch Tone; Romeo Antonio (co.) | 4:44 |
| 5. | "Time Will Reveal" (featuring Potion) | Chappell; Drake; Henderson; Georgios Kyriacos Panayiotou; Andrew Ridgeley | Krayzie Bone | 4:11 |
| 6. | "Cross Me and You Die" (featuring Joe Brown, Jr.) | Chappell; Drake; Henderson | Krayzie Bone | 3:54 |
| 7. | "Weekend Buzz" (featuring Krayzie Bone) | Chappell; Drake; Henderson; Larry Blackmon; James Harris III; Terry Lewis; Anthony Lockett | Krayzie Bone | 5:18 |
| 8. | "Trials & Tribulations" (featuring Dominique) | Chappell; Drake; Henderson; Stevland Hardaway Judkins | Krayzie Bone | 4:03 |
| 9. | "Smilin' in Your Face" | Chappell; Drake | Poetic Hustla'z | 4:23 |
| 10. | "Searchin' 4 Peace" | Chappell; Drake; Henderson | Krayzie Bone | 4;12 |
| 11. | "Time Will Reveal (Acoustic)" (featuring Potion) | Chappell; Drake | | 4:07 |
| Total length: | | | | 48:38 |

== Personnel ==
- Anthony "Tony Tone" Chappell – main artist, producer (tracks: 2, 9)
- Richard "Mo! Hart" Drake – main artist, producer (tracks: 2, 9)
- Ronald "Boogy Nikke" Poole – main artist, producer (tracks: 2, 9)
- Stanley "Flesh-n-Bone" Howse – vocals (track 1)
- Steven "Layzie Bone" Howse – vocals (track 3), executive producer
- Dominique – vocals (tracks: 3, 8)
- Charles "Wish Bone" Scruggs – vocals (track 4)
- Nicole Stewart – vocals (tracks: 5, 11)
- Annette Stewart – vocals (tracks: 5, 11)
- Joe Brown Jr. – performer (track 6), assistant engineering, assistant mixing
- Anthony "Krayzie Bone" Henderson – vocals (track 7), producer (tracks: 1, 5–8, 10), executive producer
- Ayasha Jones – additional vocals
- Lalesa Jones – additional vocals
- Jimmy Zavala – saxophone (track 7)
- Romeo Antonio – piano (track 8), acoustic guitar (track 11), producer (track 3), co-producer (track 4)
- Tony "Touch Tone" Issacs – producer (track 4), co-producer (track 3)
- Erik Nordquist – recording (tracks: 1, 2), mixing
- Mark "V" Myers – recording (tracks: 3–11)
- Rod Mendoza – assistant engineering & assistant recording (tracks: 1–4, 6–8, 10, 11)
- Brian "Big Bass" Gardner – mastering
- David Bett – art direction
- Randy Ronquillo – artwork, design
- Chiu Liu – design
- Peter Dokus – photography
- Steve Lobel – A&R, management
- Jhane Isaacs – stylist
- Gregory Stamps – assistant engineering

== Charts ==
| Chart (1997) | Peak position |
|---|---|
| US Top R&B Albums (Billboard) | 96 |
