= Triple Feature =

Book by Joe R. Lansdale

- Author: Joe R. Lansdale
- Cover artist: Glenn Chadbourne
- Language: English
- Genre: Mystery, short story collection,
- Publisher: Subterranean Press
- Publication date: 1997
- Publication place: United States
- Media type: Print hardcover, limited edition chapbook
- Pages: 29
- ISBN: 1-892284-55-3
- Preceded by: Private Eye Action, As You Like It (1998)
- Followed by: The Long Ones: Nuthin' But Novellas (2000)

Triple Feature is a collection of works by American author Joe R. Lansdale, published in a very limited edition by Subterranean Press in 1999.

It contains:

- For Just One Hour
- The Headstone (written with Bill Pronzini and Jeffrey Wallman)
- The Original Lengueenies

The Headstone has not been included in any other collection. The other two stories were included in For a Few Stories More.
