= Romeo Antonio =

American filmmaker, musician, and author

- Born: Ray Romeo Antonio
- Origin: Queens, New York, United States
- Genres: R&B, pop
- Occupations: Musician, filmmaker, author
- Instruments: Vocals, guitar, piano
- Years active: 1995–present
- Website: romeoantonio.com

Ray Romeo Antonio is an American filmmaker, musician, and author.

== Career ==
=== Early career ===
Romeo Antonio's early music career started in Sydney, Australia. His debut album, The Real Romeo, was released in 1992 on A&M Records, with Antonio playing all instruments on the album. A Piece of Love Society was released in 1996 on Festival Records/BMG.

=== RomenMpire Records ===
Steve Lobel introduced Antonio to Darryl McDaniels, one of the founding members of Run-DMC, which led to Antonio producing McDaniels' solo album, Checks Thugs and Rock n Roll, which was released on Romeo Antonio's RomenMpire Records on 28 March 2006.

=== As a filmmaker ===
In 2006, Antonio executive produced the Emmy-award-winning VH1 documentary, DMC: My Adoption Journey, following Darryl McDaniels search for information about his early life and his birth parents. The Emmy Award was shared by Antonio, McDaniels, Sarah McLachlan, Shawn Papazian, and Michael DeLorenzo. It aired on CBS Sunday Morning.

In 2007 Antonio produced the TV pilot The Man written by Anthony Zuiker and directed by Simon West, starring LL Cool J.

In 2010 Antonio directed and co-wrote "Rollers" which won best drama at NYIFF. Antonio also produced "Pizza with Bullets" which won 7 film festival awards. Antonio also produced "Just Peck" starring Keir Gilchrist, Marcia Cross, Adam Arkin, and Brie Larson who went on to win the Academy Award for best actress in "Room".

Antonio also produced the 2007 short film Lucifer. In 2008, he was the Executive Producer of Trophy, a TV drama distributed by Home Box Office and Peccadillo Pictures.

In 2015 it was reported that Antonio had reached an agreement with the family of Sam Cooke to make a biopic of the soul singer.

Antonio also directed and produced a pilot for NashVegas, a scripted reality show following five people in different stages of their music industry careers, combined with a public-vote songwriting competition.

== Discography ==
=== Albums ===
- 1997: Romeo's Gys/ Still Waters [Explicit]
- 2000: Swear Not By The Mood
- 2001: Romeo's 245/ Aggravated Assault Explicit
- 2010: Romeo's Backroom Story
- 2012 Romeo's Unique [Explicit]

=== Appearances on albums by other artists ===
Year	Album	Artist	Credit
1997	Southwest Riders		Guitar, piano Producer
1997	Trials & Tribulations	Poetic Hustla'z	Guitar (Acoustic), Piano, Producer
1998	Chapter II: Family Reunion	Mo Thugs Family	Assistant Engineer, Bass, Composer, Guitar, Mixing Assistant, Producer
1998	Don Cartagena	Fat Joe	Mixing
1998	Small Soldiers War 2 Tracks	Bone Thugs-N-Harmony	Guitar (Rhythm)
1998	Small Soldiers War 5 Tracks	Bone Thugs-N-Harmony	Guitar (Rhythm)
1999	Thug Mentality 1999	Krayzie Bone	Bass, composer, mixing assistant, producer
2000	The Collection, Vol. 2	Bone Thugs-N-Harmony	Producer
2001		Stone Rivers	Composer, producer
2002	Simply Deep	Kelly Rowland	Guitar, writer "Beyond Imagination"
2003	In This Skin	Jessica Simpson	Composer, guitar, Main Personnel
2003	Moodring	Mýa	Guitar
2003	The Fighting Temptations	Movie Score	Guitar
2004	Greatest Hits	Bone Thugs-N-Harmony	Producer
2004	Greatest Video Hits	Bone Thugs-N-Harmony	Producer
2004	Reality Tour	Jessica Simpson	Composer
2005	The Rose, Vol. 2	2Pac	Producer
2006	Checks Thugs and Rock N Roll	DMC	Audio Production, Bass, Drum Programming, Executive Producer, Guitar, Mixing, Multi Instruments, Orchestra Director, Orchestration, Producer, Vocals, Background.
2009	Triple Feature	Jessica Simpson	Composer
2010	Tri-Pack	Bone Thugs-N-Harmony	Producer
