= The Process (Play-N-Skillz album) =

Studio album by Play-N-Skillz
- Released: October 18, 2005
- Recorded: 2004–2005
- Genre: Hip hop
- Length: 55:40
- Label: Latium; Universal
- Producer: Charles Chavez (exec.); Play-N-Skillz (also exec.)

Play-N-Skillz chronology
Texas 2 Da World (2003)	The Process (2005)	The Album Before the Album (2006)

Singles from The Process
- 1. "Call Me" Released: 2001; 2. "Freaks" Released: 2004

The Process is the debut studio album by American record production duo Play-N-Skillz from Dallas, Texas. Its clean version was released in 2004 and its explicit version was released on October 18, 2005, via Latium Records and Universal Records. It features contributions from Adina Howard, Akon, Big Gemini, Big Tuck, Chamillionaire, Frankie J, Krayzie Bone, Layzie Bone, Lil' Flip, Rob G, Static Major and Three 6 Mafia.

== Track listing ==
All music is composed by Juan "Play" Salinas and Oscar "Skillz" Salinas.

No.	Title	Writer(s)	Length
1.	"Let Em Go" (featuring Static Major)	J. Salinas; O. Salinas; S. Garrett	3:40
2.	"Come Home with Me (Ohh! Baby)" (featuring Akon)	J. Salinas; O. Salinas; A. Thaim; R. Broomfield; J. Horton	3:28
3.	"Do Ya Thang"	J. Salinas; O. Salinas	3:35
4.	"Take Ya Clothes Off" (featuring Three 6 Mafia)	J. Salinas; O. Salinas; P. Beauregard; J. Houston	3:46
5.	"Music's Worth It"	J. Salinas; O. Salinas	3:31
6.	"Latinos Stand Up" (featuring Big Gemini & Rob G)	J. Salinas; O. Salinas; C. Chavez; C. Dominguez; R. Gallinares	4:06
7.	"Call Me" (featuring Chamillionaire & Steve Russell)	J. Salinas; O. Salinas; H. Seriki; S. Russell	4:01
8.	"Where I'm From" (featuring Big Tuck)	J. Salinas; O. Salinas; C. Tuck	4:03
9.	"Are You Still Alone" (featuring Frankie J)	J. Salinas; O. Salinas; F. Bautista; D. Davis; E. Robinson	3:40
10.	"Skit"	J. Salinas; O. Salinas	1:06
11.	"Freaks" (featuring Krayzie Bone & Adina Howard)	J. Salinas; O. Salinas; A. Henderson; A. Howard	4:29
12.	"Now" (featuring Lil' Flip)	J. Salinas; O. Salinas; W. Weston	4:15
13.	"One of Dem Days"	J. Salinas; O. Salinas; R. Brooks; G. Jacobs; G. Clinton III; P. Wynn	3:41
14.	"Woods and Plastic"	J. Salinas; O. Salinas; A. Hester	3:32
15.	"Represent" (featuring Layzie Bone)	J. Salinas; O. Salinas; S. Howse	4:05
Total length:			55:40

Leftover tracks

- "Fuck da Bouncerz Up" (featuring Lil Jon & the Eastside Boyz)
- "Got It All" (featuring Bun B)

Sample credits

- Track 2 contains a sample of the composition "Gotta Get You Home Tonight" by Eugene Wilde
- Track 9 contains sampled elements from the composition "Ocean of Thoughts and Dreams" by The Dramatics
- Track 11 contains a sample of the composition "Moments in Love" by the Art of Noise
- Track 13 contains interpolations from the composition "Kiss You Back" written by Ronald Brooks, Gregory Jacobs, George Clinton and Philippé Wynne
- Track 14 contains a sample from the composition "Whatcha See is Whatcha Get" by The Dramatics

== Personnel ==
- Juan "Play" Salinas – main artist, producer, executive producer
- Oscar "Skillz" Salinas – main artist, producer, executive producer
- Stephen Ellis Garrett – featured artist (track 1)
- Aliaune Damala Badara Akon Thiam – featured artist (track 2)
- Paul Duane Beauregard – featured artist (track 4)
- Jordan Michael Houston – featured artist (track 4)
- Roberto Gallinares – featured artist (track 6)
- Big Gemini – featured artist (track 6)
- Hakeem Seriki – featured artist (track 7)
- Steven L. Russell-Harts – backing vocals (track 7)
- Cedric Lee Juan Tuck – featured artist (track 8)
- Francisco Javier Bautista Jr. – featured artist (track 9)
- Anthony Henderson – featured artist (track 11)
- Adina Howard – featured artist (track 11)
- Wesley Eric Weston – featured artist (track 12)
- Steven Howse – featured artist (track 15)
- James Hoover – mixing (tracks: 1–6, 8–9)
- Brian Stanley – mixing (track 7)
- David Lopez – mixing (tracks: 11–15)
- James Cruz – mastering
- Charles Chavez – executive producer
- Jonathan Mannion – photography

== Charts ==
Chart (2005)	Peak position
US Top R&B/Hip-Hop Albums (Billboard)	85
US Heatseekers Albums (Billboard)	26
