= Chapter II: Family Reunion =

Studio album by Mo Thugs
- Released: May 26, 1998
- Recorded: 1997–98
- Studio: Studio 56 (Los Angeles, CA); Audio Vision Studios (Miami, FL); H&N Studios (Miami, FL); Private Island Trax (Los Angeles, CA); G.T.R. Media Studios
- Genre: Hip hop; gangsta rap; R&B; country rap
- Length: 1:13:39
- Label: Mo Thugs; Relativity
- Producer: Archie Blaine; Damon Elliott; Disco Rick; Krayzie Bone; Layzie Bone; Michael Seifert; MT5; Paul "Tombstone" O'Neil; Romeo Antonio; Skant Bone; Souljah Boy

Mo Thugs chronology
Family Scriptures (1996)	Chapter II: Family Reunion (1998)	Mo Thugs III: The Mothership (2000)

Singles from Family Scriptures Chapter II: Family Reunion
- 1. "Ghetto Cowboy" Released: 1998; 2. "All Good" Released: 1998

Professional ratings
Review scores
Source	Rating
AllMusic	3/5 stars
Entertainment Weekly	B
The New Rolling Stone Album Guide	3.5/5 stars
The Source	4/5 stars
USA Today	3.5/4 stars

Family Scriptures Chapter II: Family Reunion is the second studio album by American hip hop collective Mo Thugs. It was released on May 26, 1998 via Mo Thugs/Relativity Records, serving as a sequel to the group's 1996 album Family Scriptures. Recording sessions took place at Studio 56 and at Private Island Trax in Los Angeles, at Audio Vision Studios and at H&N Studios in Miami, and at G.T.R. Media Studios. Production was handled by Krayzie Bone and Layzie Bone, who also served as executive producers, Archie Blaine, Damon Elliott, "Disco" Rick Taylor, Michael Seifert, MT5, Paul "Tombstone" O'Neil, Romeo Antonio, Skant Bone and Souljah Boy.

It features contributions from Flesh-n-Bone, II Tru, Ken Dawg, Krayzie Bone, Layzie Bone, Poetic Hustla'z, Souljah Boy, The Graveyard Shift, as well as Cat Cody, Felecia, MT5, Potion, Powder, Skant Bone, Thug Queen, Wish Bone and 4-U-2-Know. The album is dedicated to the Graveyard Shift member Paul "Tombstone" O'Neil, who died in 1997.

The album peaked at number 25 on the Billboard 200 and number 8 on the Top R&B/Hip-Hop Albums in the United States. On July 8, 1998, it received Gold certification status by the Recording Industry Association of America for selling 500,000 copies. It spawned two singles "Ghetto Cowboy" and "All Good". Its lead single, "Ghetto Cowboy", peaked at number 15 on the Billboard Hot 100 and later was certified Gold by the RIAA.

== Track listing ==
No.	Title	Writer(s)	Producer(s)	Length
1.	"Mo' Thug Intro" (performed by Krayzie Bone and Felecia)			1:51
2.	"Mighty Mighty Warrior" (performed by Wish Bone, Thug Queen, Felecia, Souljah Boy and Krayzie Bone)	Charles Scruggs; Kamilha Greer; Felecia Lindsay; Willy Lyons; Anthony Henderson	Krayzie Bone; "Disco" Rick Taylor (co.); Karl "K.C." Cousin (co.)	4:23
3.	"Mighty Mo Thug" (performed by Souljah Boy and Layzie Bone)	Lyons; Steven Howse	Souljah Boy	4:12
4.	"Heart of It" (performed by Skant Bone and Layzie Bone)	Robin Hardwick; Steven Howse	Skant Bone	4:37
5.	"The Queen" (performed by Thug Queen and Krayzie Bone)	Greer; Henderson	Krayzie Bone; Karl "K.C." Cousin (co.)	3:39
6.	"Riot" (performed by Flesh-n-Bone)	Stanley Howse; Damon Elliott	Damon Elliott	3:37
7.	"All Good" (performed by Felecia and Krayzie Bone)	Lindsay; Henderson; Ismael Ledesma	"Disco" Rick Taylor; Ish Ledesma (co.)	3:58
8.	"Ghetto Cowboy" (performed by Layzie Bone, Krayzie Bone, Powder, Thug Queen and Felecia)	Steven Howse; Henderson; Jimmy Lee Burke; Greer; Lindsay	Krayzie Bone; Romeo Antonio (co.)	5:25
9.	"Believe" (performed by MT5, Layzie Bone and Krayzie Bone)	Marcus Thomas; Marvin Thomas; Martin Thomas; Maurice Thomas; Marlon Thomas; Steven Howse; Henderson	MT5; Karl "K.C." Cousin (co.)	4:09
10.	"Urban Souljah" (performed by the Graveyard Shift)	Paul O'Neil; Actavius Mills; Romeo Antonio	Paul "Tombstone" O'Neil; Romeo Antonio (co.)	4:48
11.	"Ain't Said No Names (Crucial Conflict Diss)" (performed by Krayzie Bone, Tombstone and Cat Cody)	Henderson; O'Neil; Torrance Cody	Krayzie Bone; Romeo Antonio (co.)	4:06
12.	"Mo' Thuggin'" (performed by Poetic Hustla'z)	Anthony Chappell; Richard Drake; Ronald Poole	Michael Seifert	4:18
13.	"U Don't Own Me" (performed by Potion and Krayzie Bone)	Nicole Stewart; Annette Stewart; Henderson; Antonio	Romeo Antonio; Audrey Maupin (vocal)	5:44
14.	"Ride With a Playa" (performed by Ken Dawg and Krayzie Bone)	Kendon Anthony; Henderson; Antonio	Krayzie Bone; Romeo Antonio (co.)	4:12
15.	"Pimpin' Ain't Easy" (performed by II Tru, MT5 and 4-U-2-Know)	Cabrina Wilson; Belinda Wallace; Archie Blaine; Edward Townsend; Marvin Gaye	Archie Blaine	3:35
16.	"Otherside / Outro" (performed by Layzie Bone, Flesh-n-Bone, Krayzie Bone, Thug Queen, Felecia, Ken Dawg, Sin, Mo! Hart and Skant Bone)	Steven Howse; Stanley Howse; Henderson; Greer; Lindsay; Anthony; Mills; Drake; Hardwick	Layzie Bone; Karl "K.C." Cousin (co.)	11:05
Total length:				1:13:39

Sample credits

- Track 15 contains replayed elements from "Let's Get It On" written by Ed Townsend and Marvin Gaye and performed by Marvin Gaye

== Charts ==
=== Weekly charts ===
Chart (1998)	Peak position
US Billboard 200	25
US Top R&B/Hip-Hop Albums (Billboard)	8

=== Year-end charts ===
Chart (1998)	Position
US Top R&B/Hip-Hop Albums (Billboard)	100

== Certifications ==
Region	Certification	Certified units/sales
United States (RIAA)	Gold	500,000^{^}
^{^} Shipments figures based on certification alone.
