= It's Not a Game =

Studio album by Layzie Bone
- Released: May 31, 2005
- Genre: Midwest rap
- Length: 79:56
- Label: Cleopatra
- Producer: The Platinum Brothers, Darren Vegas, Cashion Howse, Denzo, Self, Dave Stewart, Mauly T., Stew Deez & Thin C.

Layzie Bone chronology
Thug by Nature (2001)	It's Not a Game (2005)	Thug Brothers (2006)

Professional ratings
Review scores
Source	Rating
RapReviews	8/10 stars
Vibe	3.5/5 stars

It's Not a Game is the second album released by Layzie Bone. It was released in 2005. The album peaked at number 15 on the Billboard Top Rap Albums chart, number 31 on the Top R&B/Hip-Hop Albums chart, and number 96 on the Billboard 200.

Tracks two and nine had previously appeared on his 2001 release Thug by Nature.

== Track listing ==
#	Title	Featured guest	Length
1	Intro: It's Not a Game		2:56
2	There They Go	Aaron Hall	4:01
3	Midwest Invasion	Twista	5:19
4	Ain't No Waitin	Thin C.	3:50
5	Thug Nation	Krayzie Bone	4:23
6	I Don't Remember	Thick and Thin C.	4:02
7	Stayin' Alive		3:56
8	Nothin'	Thin C.	3:42
9	Connectin' the Plots	WC	4:28
10	Skit - Choppin' Game	L. Burna	0:30
11	Way Too Many	Outlawz and Stew Deez	4:07
12	Thugged Out	Thin C. and DJ Dre Ghost	4:59
13	2 Step	Thin C.	4:03
14	She Came ta Party	Thin C. and DJ Dre Ghost	3:53
15	Do You Want Me		3:54
16	It's On	M.T.F.	4:43
17	Smokin' on Information	M.T.F., Snoop Dogg and Joe Little	5:14
18	Run Game	Dogzilla and Stew Deez	4:16
19	The Movement	M.T.F.	5:12
20	Outro		1:24
