= Thug by Nature =

Studio album by L-Burna a.k.a. Layzie Bone
- Released: March 20, 2001
- Recorded: 2000–01
- Genre: Hip hop; hardcore hip hop
- Length: 1:10:42
- Label: Ruthless; Epic
- Producer: Layzie Bone (exec.); Tomica Wright (exec.); BB; Buddy Banks; Damon Elliott; Darren Vegas; Dre Ghost; L.T. Hutton; Mauly T; Michael Seifert; Red Spyda; Step; Thin C

Layzie Bone chronology
Thug by Nature (2001)	It's Not a Game (2005)

Professional ratings
Review scores
Source	Rating
AllMusic	2.5/5 stars
RapReviews	7.5/10
The New Rolling Stone Album Guide	2/5 stars

Thug by Nature is the debut solo studio album by American rapper Layzie Bone, released under his L-Burna alias. It was released on March 20, 2001, through Ruthless Records with distribution via Epic Records. Production was handled by L.T. Hutton, Darren Vegas, Michael Seifert, BB, Buddy Banks, Damon Elliott, Red Spyda, Dre' Ghost, Mauly T., Step and Thin C., with Tomica Wright and Layzie Bone serving as executive producers. It features guest appearances from Aaron Hall, Baby S, Big Chan, Dekumpozed, Flesh-n-Bone, WC, Geraldine Sigler and Bizzy Bone and Emmortal Thugs on the bonus disc. The album peaked at number 43 on the Billboard 200 and number 17 on the Top R&B/Hip-Hop Albums, with 36,406 copies sold in the United States in the first week. It also made it to number 30 on the Official New Zealand Music Chart.

"Battlefield" and "Deadly Musical" are diss songs aimed at Chicago-based group Do Or Die.

The song "Back Up Against The Wall" is featured on the Soundtrack of Down to Earth.

== Track listing ==
No.	Title	Writer(s)	Producer(s)	Length
1.	"Carole of the Bones" (featuring Geraldine Sigler)	Steven Howse; Michael Seifert	Michael Seifert	0:54
2.	"Battlefield"	Howse; Lenton Terrell Hutton	L.T. Hutton	4:04
3.	"Connectin' the Plots" (featuring WC)	Howse; William Calhoun; Darren Thomas Hubbard	Darren Vegas	4:23
4.	"Fear No Man"	Howse; Hutton	L.T. Hutton	3:39
5.	"Time Will Tell" (featuring Dekumpozed)	Howse; Brence Skinner; Hutton	L.T. Hutton	4:16
6.	"Where You Goin?" (Skit)			1:10
7.	"How Long Will It Last"	Howse; Hutton	L.T. Hutton	4:53
8.	"Deadly Musical"	Howse; Edward Banks; Amefika Williams	Buddy Banks; Thin C.	4:18
9.	"Fire in tha Hole" (Skit)			0:39
10.	"There They Go" (featuring Aaron Hall)	Howse; Aaron Hall; M. Taylor	Mauly T.	3:59
11.	"My Niggaz"	Howse; Robin Hardwick; Andre Bell	D.J. Dre Ghost	3:11
12.	"Still the Greatest" (featuring Flesh-n-Bone and Big Chan)	Howse; Stanley Howse; Chan Gaines; Hubbard	Darren Vegas	5:29
13.	"Make My Day" (featuring Baby S)	Howse; David Ware; Leonard Bunn	Step	3:54
14.	"Lock-n-Load"	Howse; Hutton	L.T. Hutton	4:34
15.	"Up Against the Wall"	Howse; Hubbard	Darren Vegas	3:45
16.	"Thug by Nature"	Howse; Andy Thelusma; BB	Red Spyda; BB	4:42
17.	"Smoke On"	Howse; D'wayne Wiggins; Charles Ray Wiggins; Timothy Christian Riley	Damon Elliott	3:57
18.	"Listen"	Howse; Hubbard	Darren Vegas	4:05
19.	"As the Rain"	Howse; Seifert	Michael Seifert	4:50
Total length:				1:10:42

=== Bonus disc ===
Bonus disc 1

1. "It's all Hood Niggaz"
2. "M.O.G."

Bonus disc 2

1. "Money on da Wood" (featuring Bizzy Bone, Skant Bone and E-Mortal Thugs)
2. "No Matter"

== Personnel ==
- Steven "Layzie Bone"/"L-Burna" Howse – main artist, executive producer
- Geraldine 'Gere' Sigler – vocals (track 1)
- William "WC" Calhoun – featured artist (track 3)
- Brence "Dekumpozed" Skinner – featured artist (track 5)
- Aaron Hall – featured artist (track 10)
- Stanley "Flesh-n-Bone" Howse – featured artist (track 12)
- "Big Chan" Gaines – featured artist (track 12)
- David "Baby S" Ware – featured artist (track 13)
- Michael Seifert – producer & recording (tracks: 1, 19)
- Lenton Terrell Hutton – producer (tracks: 2, 4, 5, 7, 14)
- Darren "Vegas" Hubbard – producer (tracks: 3, 12, 15, 18)
- Edward "Buddy" Banks – producer (track 8)
- Amefika "Thin C" Williams – producer (track 8)
- Mauly Taylor – producer (track 10)
- Andre "Dre Ghost" Bell – producer (track 11)
- Step – producer (track 13)
- BB – producer (track 16)
- Red Spyda – producer (track 16)
- Damon Elliott – producer & recording (track 17)
- Aaron Connor – mixing (tracks: 1, 3, 8, 11–13, 15, 16, 18)
- Brian Springer – recording (tracks: 2, 4, 5, 7), mixing (tracks: 2, 4, 7, 14)
- Richard E. Harris Jr. – recording (tracks: 3, 8, 15, 18, 19)
- Gabe Chiesa – recording (tracks: 4, 7)
- Erik Nordquist – recording (tracks: 11, 17)
- Dino "The Cut" Johnson – recording (track 13)
- Tim Nitz – recording (track 14)
- "Disco Rick" Taylor – recording (track 16)
- Michael Dean – mixing (track 17)
- Eric Williams – recording (track 19)
- Jason Walker – engineering assistant (track 10)
- Joe Brown – engineering assistant (track 17)
- Tomica Wright – executive producer
- Giulio Costanzo – art direction, design
- Image Lumumba – photography

== Charts ==
Chart (2001)	Peak position
New Zealand Albums (RMNZ)	30
US Billboard 200	43
US Top R&B/Hip-Hop Albums (Billboard)	17
