= Bone Brothers 2 =

Studio album by Bone Brothers
- Released: May 8, 2007
- Recorded: 2006
- Studio: The White House
- Genre: Hip hop; gangsta rap; hardcore hip hop
- Length: 42:11
- Label: Real Talk Entertainment
- Producer: Derrick "Sac" Johnson (also exec.); Big Hollis; Preach; Vince V.

Bone Brothers chronology
Bone Brothers (2005)	Bone Brothers 2 (2007)	Bone-Ified: Thugs Unification (2007)

Professional ratings
Review scores
Source	Rating
AllMusic	3/5 stars

Bone Brothers 2 is an album the record label put out. It's a mix of old verses from Bizzy Bone and Layzie Bone. It was released via Real Talk Entertainment on May 8, 2007, the same day as Bone Thugs-n-Harmony's Strength & Loyalty. Recording sessions took place at the White House with Black Trim. Production was handled by Big Hollis, Vince V., Preach and Derrick "Sac" Johnson, who also served as executive producer. The album debuted at number 122 on the U.S. Billboard 200 chart, selling over 7,000 units during its first week. Albums purchased at Best Buy include three bonus Bizzy Bone tracks.

== Track listing ==
No.	Title	Producer(s)	Length
1.	"Bone Thugs-N-Harmony"	Walter "Big Hollis" Hollis	0:55
2.	"Soldiers"	Vince V.	3:53
3.	"One Day"	Vince V.	3:26
4.	"Stackin That Paper"	Walter "Big Hollis" Hollis; Preach	4:02
5.	"We Are Warriors"	Walter "Big Hollis" Hollis; Preach	4:29
6.	"Straight to the Top"	Derrick "Sac" Johnson	0:48
7.	"Thugs Need Luv"	Walter "Big Hollis" Hollis	3:56
8.	"Wake Up, Get Up"	Walter "Big Hollis" Hollis	3:41
9.	"Walk Away"	Derrick "Sac" Johnson	0:42
10.	"Get It"	Vince V.	3:46
11.	"Kick Back"	Walter "Big Hollis" Hollis	4:06
12.	"Anything"	Vince V.	3:54
13.	"Come N Up Big"	Walter "Big Hollis" Hollis	3:19
14.	"Bone Thug 4 Life"	Walter "Big Hollis" Hollis	1:14
Total length:			42:11

Best Buy bonus tracks
No.	Title	Length
15.	"2 tha Block"	5:24
16.	"Explain to Me"	6:00
17.	"Lookin the Same"	3:11

== Personnel ==
- Bryon "Bizzy Bone" McCane – main artist
- Steven "Layzie Bone" Howse – main artist
- Walter Hollis – producer (tracks: 1, 4, 5, 7, 8, 11, 13, 14), engineering, mixing
- Vince V. – producer (tracks: 2, 3, 10, 12)
- Preach – producer (tracks: 4, 5)
- Derrick "Sac" Johnson – producer (tracks: 6, 9), executive producer
- Black Trim – recording
- Ken Lee – mastering

== Charts ==
Chart (2007)	Peak position
US Billboard 200	122
US Top R&B/Hip-Hop Albums (Billboard)	26
US Top Rap Albums (Billboard)	7
US Independent Albums (Billboard)	11
