= Bone Brothers (album) =

Studio album by Bone Brothers
- Released: February 22, 2005
- Recorded: 2004
- Genre: Hip-hop; gangsta rap
- Length: 51:11
- Label: Koch Records
- Producer: Bizzy Bone (exec.); Layzie Bone (exec.); Steve Lobel (exec.); Dwayne "Deenucka" Johnson; Mauly T; Self

Bone Brothers chronology
Bone Brothers (2005)	Bone Brothers 2 (2007)

Professional ratings
Review scores
Source	Rating
AllMusic	3/5 stars
Entertainment Weekly	C+
RapReviews	7/10

Bone Brothers is the self-titled debut studio album by American hip-hop duo Bone Brothers, composed of Bone Thugs-N-Harmony members Bizzy Bone and Layzie Bone. It was released on February 22, 2005 via Koch Records. Production was handled by Dwayne "Deenucka" Johnson, Self and Mauly T, with Bizzy Bone, Steve Lobel and Layzie Bone serving as executive producers. It features guest appearances from Kareem, Outlawz, Treach, and several Mo Thugs members, such as Krayzie Bone, Felicia, Skant Bone, Stew Bone and Wish Bone. The album saw its release after the dismissal of Bizzy Bone from the group Bone Thugs-N-Harmony.

The album peaked at number sixty on the Billboard 200, number 18 on the Top R&B/Hip-Hop Albums, number 8 on the Top Rap Albums and number 3 on the Independent Albums in the United States. "Hip Hop Baby" was the only single released from this album.

== Track listing ==
No.	Title	Writer(s)	Length
1.	"Intro"	Steven Howse; Bryon McCane; Dwayne Johnson	0:34
2.	"Like Me"	Steven Howse; McCane; Edward Hinson; Johnson	3:47
3.	"What's Friends" (featuring Krayzie Bone)	Steven Howse; McCane; Anthony Henderson; Hinson; Johnson	4:03
4.	"Dick Rider"	Steven Howse; McCane; Hinson; Johnson	4:43
5.	"No Rules" (featuring Mo Thugs)	Steven Howse; Steward Howse; Darryl Hudson; Paul Hardwick; Hinson; Johnson	4:12
6.	"Felecia Skit"	Felecia Lindsey; Johnson	0:32
7.	"Give It To Me" (featuring Felecia)	Steven Howse; McCane; Lindsey; Hinson; Johnson	3:46
8.	"Need Your Body" (featuring Krayzie Bone and Kareem)	Steven Howse; McCane; Henderson; Hinson; Johnson	3:57
9.	"Complicated" (featuring Outlawz)	Steven Howse; Katari T. Cox; Malcolm Greenidge; Henderson; Hinson; Johnson	3:32
10.	"Hip Hop Baby" (featuring Krayzie Bone)	Steven Howse; McCane; Henderson; Hinson; Johnson; Clifford Branch	3:47
11.	"Real Life" (featuring Krayzie Bone and Treach)	Steven Howse; McCane; Henderson; Anthony Criss; Hinson; Johnson; J. Heard	5:28
12.	"Blow You Away" (featuring Skant Bone)	Steven Howse; McCane; Robin Hardwick; Hinson; Johnson; Branch	3:38
13.	"Str8 Ridaz" (featuring Krayzie Bone)	Steven Howse; McCane; Henderson; Hinson; Johnson	3:54
14.	"Everyday" (featuring Krayzie Bone and Wish Bone)	Steven Howse; McCane; Henderson; Charles Scruggs; Tim Middleton	5:18
Total length:			51:11

== Charts ==
Chart (2005)	Peak position
US Billboard 200	60
US Top R&B/Hip-Hop Albums (Billboard)	18
US Top Rap Albums (Billboard)	8
US Independent Albums (Billboard)	3
