= The Movement (Mo Thugs album) =

Studio album by Mo Thugs
- Released: June 10, 2003
- Recorded: 2002–03
- Genre: Hip hop; gangsta rap
- Length: 1:12:58
- Label: Riviera Entertainment
- Producer: Denzo; Dirty Red; DJ Skail; Mark Twayne; Mauly T; The Platinum Brothers; Thin C

Mo Thugs chronology
Mo Thugs III: The Mothership (2000)	The Movement (2003)	Eternal (2023)

Professional ratings
Review scores
Source	Rating
AllMusic	2.5/5 stars
RapReviews	5/10

The Movement is the fourth studio album by American hip hop collective Mo Thugs. It was released June 10, 2003 via Riviera Entertainment. Production was handled by Mauly T, Thin C., Dirty Red, Denzo, DJ Skail, Mark Twayne, and The Platinum Brothers, with Aldy Damian and Layzie Bone serving as executive producers. The album peaked at number 25 on the Top R&B/Hip-Hop Albums and number 17 on the Independent Albums in the United States.

== Track listing ==
No.	Title	Writer(s)	Producer(s)	Length
1.	"Intro"			1:26
2.	"The Movement" (performed by Felecia, Emmortal Thugs, Skant Bone, Dirty Red, Ken Dawg and Thin C.)	Felecia Lindsey; Steward Howse; Danny Hudson; Paul Hardwick; Robin Hardwick; L. Person; G. Cunningham; Kendon Anthony; Amefika Williams	Dirty Red	5:10
3.	"Told Chall" (performed by Emmortal Thugs, Layzie Bone and Skant Bone)	Steward Howse; Hudson; P. Hardwick; Steven Howse; R. Hardwick	Mauly T	3:45
4.	"It Ain't Nottin'" (performed by Ken Dawg)	Anthony	Mauly T	4:28
5.	"Do Your Thang" (performed by Felecia, Layzie Bone and Krayzie Bone)	Lindsey; Steven Howse; Anthony Henderson	Denzo	3:56
6.	"Fa' Sho'" (performed by Skant Bone)	R. Hardwick	Dirty Red	4:14
7.	"All Life Long" (performed by Felecia and Layzie Bone)	Lindsey; Steven Howse	The Platinum Brothers	3:41
8.	"Love Is" (performed by Thin C.)	Williams	Thin C.	3:41
9.	"Tha Land" (performed by DJ Skail)	Person	DJ Skail	3:47
10.	"My Dawgs" (performed by Emmortal Thugs)	Steward Howse; Hudson; P. Hardwick; M. Taylor	Mauly T	4:54
11.	"It's Fast" (performed by Ken Dawg and Dirty Red)	Anthony; Cunningham	Dirty Red	3:36
12.	"Maximum Maximize" (performed by Emmortal Thugs)	Steward Howse; Hudson; P. Hardwick	Mauly T	4:27
13.	"Smokin' on Information" (performed by Layzie Bone, Ken Dawg, Skant Bone, Snoop Dogg and Joe Little)	Steven Howse; Anthony; R. Hardwick; Calvin Broadus	Mauly T	5:11
14.	"Can You Dig It" (performed by Thin C. and Layzie Bone)	Williams; Steven Howse	Thin C.	4:13
15.	"Dead Wrong" (performed by Skant Bone, Mark Twayne and Khujo Goodie)	R. Hardwick; Mark Twayne; Willie Edward Knighton	Mark Twayne	4:29
16.	"Be Free" (performed by Layzie Bone and Krayzie Bone)	Steven Howse; Henderson	Thin C.	4:04
17.	"Who Ya Gonna Run To" (performed by Felecia)	Lindsey	Thin C.	3:48
18.	"Thug Finale" (performed by Skant Bone, Emmortal Thugs, Layzie Bone and Krayzie Bone)	R. Hardwick; Steward Howse; Hudson; P. Hardwick; Steven Howse; Henderson	Thin C.	4:08
Total length:				1:12:58

== Charts ==
Chart (2003)	Peak position
US Top R&B/Hip-Hop Albums (Billboard)	25
US Independent Albums (Billboard)	17
