= Family Scriptures =

Studio album by Mo Thugs
- Released: November 5, 1996
- Recorded: 1995–96
- Studio: Private Island Trax (Los Angeles, CA)
- Genre: Hip hop
- Length: 1:14:51
- Label: Mo Thugs; Relativity
- Producer: Archie Blaine; Bobby Jones; Krayzie Bone; Paul "Tombstone" O'Neil

Mo Thugs chronology
Family Scriptures (1996)	Chapter II: Family Reunion (1998)

Singles from Family Scriptures
- 1. "Thug Devotion" Released: 1996

Professional ratings
Review scores
Source	Rating
AllMusic	3/5 stars
Entertainment Weekly	A−
The Source	4/5 stars

Family Scriptures is the debut studio album by American hip hop collective Mo Thugs. It was released on November 5, 1996, via Mo Thugs/Relativity Records. The recording sessions took place at Private Island Trax in Los Angeles. It was produced by Krayzie Bone, who also served as executive producer together with Layzie Bone, Archie Blaine, Bobby Jones and Paul "Tombstone" O'Neil, with co-producers Gates and Sin. It features contributions from Flesh-n-Bone, II Tru, Ken Dawg, Krayzie Bone, Layzie Bone, Poetic Hustla'z, Souljah Boy, the Graveyard Shift, and Tré.

The album peaked at number two on the Billboard 200 and the Top R&B/Hip-Hop Albums in the United States selling 219,000 copies. On January 3, 1997, it received Platinum certification status by the Recording Industry Association of America for selling 1,000,000 copies.

Its sequel, Mo Thugs Family Scriptures Chapter II: Family Reunion, was released on May 26, 1998.

== Controversy ==
On April 28, 2011, former Bone Thugs-n-Harmony/Mo Thugs associate Roland Brown filed the lawsuit in the Cuyahoga County Court of Common Pleas in Cuyahoga County, Ohio, for breach of contract over unpaid royalties, claiming he wrote “Take Your Time” and “Here With Me” by Tré. Naming Mo Thugs Records, Loud Records, Relativity Records, Ruthless Records, Sony Music and Warner Music Group as defendants, Brown was seeking for $27 million ($24 million in damages and $3 million in mechanical royalties for the single, music video, and Family Scriptures album).

== Track listing ==
No.	Title	Writer(s)	Producer(s)	Length
1.	"Intro" (performed by Tré and Krayzie Bone)			1:20
2.	"Searchin' 4 Peace" (performed by Poetic Hustla'z)	Ronald Poole; Anthony Chappell; Richard Drake; Anthony Henderson; Bobby Jones	Krayzie Bone	3:32
3.	"Ghetto Bluez" (performed by II Tru and Layzie Bone)	Belinda Wallace; Cabrina Wilson; Steven Howse; Archie Blaine	Archie Blaine	5:49
4.	"Killing Fields" (performed by the Graveyard Shift)	Paul O'Neil; Actavius Mills; Arran Baldwin; Henderson; Jones	Krayzie Bone; Bobby Jones (co.)	5:15
5.	"Mo' Murder" (performed by Krayzie Bone)	Henderson; Jones; Anne Dudley; Gary Langan; Jonathan Jeczalik; Paul Morley; Trevor Horn	Krayzie Bone	4:55
6.	"Ain't No Reason" (performed by Ken Dawg)	Kendon Anthony; Blaine	Archie Blaine	4:59
7.	"Take Your Time" (performed by Tré and Krayzie Bone)	Kimberly Cromartie; Niko Williams; Rebecca Forsha; Henderson; Jones	Bobby Jones	4:53
8.	"Welcome to My World" (performed by II Tru and Ken Dawg)	Wallace; Wilson; Anthony; Blaine; George Clinton; William Collins; Gary Lee Cooper	Archie Blaine	4:42
9.	"Thug Devotion" (performed by Layzie Bone, Krayzie Bone, Tré, Ken Dawg and Souljah Boy)	Steven Howse; Henderson; Cromartie; Williams; Forsha; Anthony; Willy Lyons; Jones; Philip Bailey; Maurice White	Bobby Jones	4:35
10.	"Here With Me" (performed by Tré)	Cromartie; Williams; Forsha; Henderson; Jones	Krayzie Bone; Bobby Jones (co.)	5:36
11.	"Playa in Me" (performed by Ken Dawg)	Anthony; Blaine; Leo Graham; Paul Richmond; Darryl Ellis	Archie Blaine	4:38
12.	"No Pretender" (performed by Jhaz, Tombstone, Boogie Nikke and Krayzie Bone)	Henderson; Jones	Krayzie Bone	4:37
13.	"Rumors and War" (performed by the Graveyard Shift and Flesh-n-Bone)	O'Neil; Mills; Baldwin; Stanley Howse; Jones	Bobby Jones; Krayzie Bone (co.); Paul "Tombstone" O'Neil (co.); Actavius "Sin" Mills (co.); Arran "Gates" Baldwin (co.)	5:17
14.	"II Tru" (performed by II Tru)	Wallace; Wilson; Blaine	Archie Blaine	3:53
15.	"Low Down" (performed by Souljah Boy and Krayzie Bone)	Lyons; O'Neil	Paul "Tombstone" O'Neil; Bobby Jones (co.)	4:44
16.	"Family Scriptures" (performed by the Graveyard Shift, Poetic Hustla'z, II Tru, Ken Dawg, Souljah Boy, Krayzie Bone, Layzie Bone, Flesh-n-Bone and Tré)	O'Neil; Mills; Baldwin; Poole; Chappell; Drake; Wallace; Wilson; Anthony; Lyons; Henderson; Steven Howse; Stanley Howse; Cromartie; Williams; Forsha	Krayzie Bone; Bobby Jones (co.)	6:35
Total length:				1:14:51

Sample credits

- Track 5 contains elements from "Moments in Love" written by Anne Dudley, Gary Langan, Jonathan Jeczalik, Paul Morley and Trevor Horn and performed by Art of Noise
- Track 8 contains elements from "May the Force Be with You" written by George Clinton, William Collins and Gary Lee Cooper and performed by Bootsy's Rubber Band
- Track 9 contains replayed elements from "Devotion" written by Philip Bailey and Maurice White and performed by Earth, Wind & Fire
- Track 11 contains elements from "Ain't Nothing I Can Do" written by Leo Graham, Paul Richmond and Darryl Ellis and performed by Tyrone Davis
- Track 14 contains elements from "I Feel Like Loving You Today" written by Isaac Hayes and performed by Donald Byrd

== Personnel ==
- Anthony Henderson – performer (tracks: 1, 5, 7, 9, 12, 15, 16), producer (tracks: 2, 4, 5, 10, 12, 16), co-producer (track 13), executive producer
- Kimberly Cromartie – performer (tracks: 1, 7, 9, 10, 16)
- Niko Williams – performer (tracks: 1, 7, 9, 10, 16)
- Rebecca Forsha – performer (tracks: 1, 7, 9, 10, 16)
- Ronald Poole – performer (tracks: 2, 12, 16)
- Anthony Chappell – performer (tracks: 2, 16)
- Richard Drake – performer (tracks: 2, 16)
- Belinda Wallace – performer (tracks: 3, 8, 12, 14, 16)
- Cabrina Wilson – performer (tracks: 3, 8, 14, 16)
- Steven Howse – performer (tracks: 3, 9, 16), executive producer
- Paul O'Neil – performer (tracks: 4, 12, 13, 16), keyboards & producer (track 15), co-producer (track 13)
- Actavius Mills – performer (tracks: 4, 13, 16), co-producer (track 13)
- Arran Baldwin – performer (tracks: 4, 13, 16), co-producer (track 13)
- Kendon Anthony – performer (tracks: 6, 8, 9, 11, 16)
- Willy Lyons – performer (tracks: 9, 15, 16)
- Stanley Howse – performer (tracks: 13, 16)
- Bobby Jones – keyboards (tracks: 2, 4, 5, 7, 9, 12, 13, 15, 16), producer (tracks: 7, 9, 13), co-producer (tracks: 4, 10, 15, 16), mixing & recording (tracks: 2, 4, 5, 7, 9, 10, 12, 13, 15, 16)
- Jimmy Zavala – saxophone (track 3)
- Romeo Antonio – guitar (tracks: 4, 7, 9, 16)
- David Sewell – guitar (track 13)
- Archie Blaine – producer, mixing & recording (tracks: 3, 6, 8, 11, 14)
- Jeff Shirley – mixing (tracks: 2–4, 6, 8, 11, 13, 14), recording (tracks: 3, 5–8, 10, 11, 14–16)
- Brian K. Nutter – recording (track 2)
- Furman Smith – recording (track 4)
- John Wydrycs – mixing (tracks: 5, 7, 9, 12, 15, 16)
- Eric Fahlborg – recording (track 9)
- Paul Real – assistant engineering (track 9)
- Mark "V" Myers – mixing & recording (track 10)
- Jason Mackey – recording (track 12)
- Jessie Stewart – recording (track 13), assistant engineering (tracks: 4, 12)
- Nate Carpenter – assistant engineering (track 13)
- David Bett – art direction
- Patrick Aquintey – art direction
- Josh Nichols – cover
- Christian Lantry – photography
- Steve Lobel – A&R

== Charts ==
=== Weekly charts ===
Chart (1996–97)	Peak position
New Zealand Albums (RMNZ)	20
US Billboard 200	2
US Top R&B/Hip-Hop Albums (Billboard)	2

=== Year-end charts ===
Chart (1997)	Position
US Billboard 200	90
US Top R&B/Hip-Hop Albums (Billboard)	76

== Certifications ==
Region	Certification	Certified units/sales
United States (RIAA)	Platinum	1,000,000^{^}
^{^} Shipments figures based on certification alone.
