= Bone Brothers =

American hip hop group

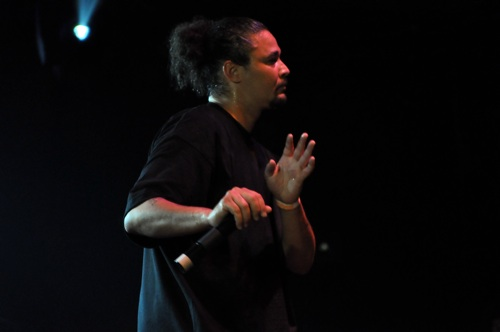

Background information
- Also known as: Bone Thugs, B.O.N.E.
- Origin: Cleveland, Ohio, United States
- Genres: G-Funk; Midwest Rap; Gangsta rap Urban
- Years active: 2004-present
- Labels: Ruthless; Interscope; Real Talk
- Members: Layzie Bone; Bizzy Bone

Bone Brothers is an American hip-hop duo composed of Bone Thugs-n-Harmony members Layzie Bone and Bizzy Bone. The first Bone Brothers album was released in 2005. Bizzy Bone had parted ways from the group in 2003 over personal differences and business decisions. Bizzy Bone had always remained friendly with the group and collaborated on songs such as Lil Eazy's This Ain't A Game and Krayzie Bone's Getchu Twisted Remix. The Bone Brother's track Hip-Hop Baby contains four of the five members in the music video. In 2009 the whole group came together to record tracks for Uni5: The World's Enemy during the wake of Flesh-n-Bone's return from prison. Bone Brothers is an album series and not a name for Layzie Bone and Bizzy Bone collaboration albums. Albums like Still Creepin On Ah Come Up are excluded from the series. It is also conceivable of any pair or more Bone Thugs-N-Harmony members making a Bone Brothers album in the future.

== Discography ==
=== Studio albums ===
Title	Release	Peak chart positions			
Title	Release	US	US R&B	US Rap	US Ind
Bone Brothers	2005	60	18	8	3
Bone Brothers 2	2007	122	26	7	11
Bone Brothers III	2008	—	59	23	46
Still Creepin on Ah Come Up	2008	—	47	18	45

=== Compilation albums ===
- The Best of Bone Brothers (2010)

=== Mixtapes ===
- Bone Brothers IV (2011)

=== Singles ===
==== As a lead artist ====
Title	Release	Peak chart positions				Album
Title	Release	US	US R&B	US Rap	UK	Album
"Hip Hop Baby " (featuring Krayzie Bone)	2005	—	106	—	—	Bone Brothers
"Everyday" (featuring Bone Thugs-N-Harmony)	2005	—	—	—	69	Bone Brothers
"Anything"	2007	—	—	32	—	Bone Brothers 2
"Rollercoaster"	2008	—	—	57	—	Bone Brothers III
"—" denotes a recording that did not chart or was not released in that territory.
