= Poetic Hustla'z =

Rap group from Cleveland, Ohio

- Also known as: Tha Hustla'z
- Origin: Cleveland, Ohio, United States
- Genres: Hip-hop
- Years active: 1995–2000, 2014–2015
- Labels: Mo Thugs, Ruthless 1995–2000
- Members: Boogie Nikke; Tony Tone; Mo! Hart
- Website: Poetic Hustla'z on Myspace

Poetic Hustla'z was an American hip hop group from Cleveland, Ohio, with three members: Boogie Nikke, Tony Tone and Mo! Hart. They first appeared together on the Bone Thugs-N-Harmony song "Shotz To Tha Double Glock" from the album E. 1999 Eternal in 1995. They released their debut album, Trials & Tribulations, in 1997 on Mo Thugs Records.

== Background ==
Bone Thugs-N-Harmony signed Poetic Hustla'z to their label, Mo Thugs. The group was formed by Mo! Hart, Tony Tone, and Boogy Nikke. Boogy Nikke appeared on the Intro of B.O.N.E. Enterprise (Bone Thugs-N-Harmony) album "Faces of Death." As a trio they first appeared in 1995 on the song "Shotz To Tha Double Glock" from Bone Thugs-N-Harmony's album E. 1999 Eternal, and later on the Mo Thugs Family all-star project album Family Scriptures in 1996. After signing to Mo Thugs, they recorded their debut album, Trials & Tribulations, for release in November 1997.

Trials & Tribulations peaked at number 96 on the Billboard Top R&B/Hip-Hop Albums. Along with singles, music videos were released for two songs: "Trials & Tribulations" and "Day & Night" featuring Layzie Bone. The video for "Trials & Tribulations" features cameo appearances by Bizzy Bone and Flesh-n-Bone.

After a 14-year hiatus, in early 2015, Poetic Hustla'z released a song "Poetic Hustlaz" featuring former Mo thugs member Souljah Boy, under a Cleveland independent record label, Taliup Records. The song's accompanying music video was released on April 4, 2015.

== Discography ==
=== Albums ===
Title	Release	Peak chart positions
Title	Release	US R&B
Trials & Tribulations	Released: 11 November 1997; Label: Relativity	96
