= Mo Thugs =

American hip hop collective

- Origin: Cleveland, Ohio, U.S.
- Genres: Hip hop
- Years active: 1995–present
- Labels: Harmony Howse Entertainment; Relativity; Koch; Def Jam
- Spinoff of: Bone Thugs-n-Harmony

Mo Thugs is an American hip hop collective formed and led by Bone Thugs-n-Harmony. Their logo, a pyramid with a fist above it, is symbolic of their achievements; The pyramid stands for longevity, and the fist stands for victory.

== History ==
Due to the success of their albums Creepin on ah Come Up and E. 1999 Eternal, Bone Thugs established Mo Thugs Records to introduce many of the Cleveland-based and other artists that they were developing. The group's first album, Family Scriptures was released in November 1996 produced by Romeo Antonio. The album was a success, peaking at No. 2 on both the Billboard 200 and Top R&B/Hip-Hop Albums (held from the top spot of both charts by Tupac Shakur's The Don Killuminati: The 7 Day Theory), and reaching platinum status for sales over one million copies. Mo Thugs followed Family Scriptures in 1998 with Chapter II: Family Reunion which was then followed by Mo Thugs III: The Mothership in 2000, and The Movement in 2003. In 2010, Layzie Bone restructured the company, branding Harmony Howse Ent. as the new parent company over Mo Thugs, governing the regional satellite branches of the ever-expanding Mo Thugs Family, such as Mo Mo Thugs West, and the rest of the Mo Thugs Affiliates worldwide. In 2023, after years of inactivity, Mo Thugs returned for 2 albums, 'Eternal' and 'ThugLine Vs MoThugs'(sic), with both albums being released under Mo Thugs Records. Past and present artists include: Felecia, Poetic Hustla'z, II Tru, Graveyard Shift, Romeo Antonio, Ken Dawg, Souljah Boy (not to be confused with Soulja Boy), Tre', Skant, Thug Queen, Powder P, Potion, MT5, DJ Ice, Emmortal Thugs, Desperados, Lil Mack, Black Hole of Watts, Dirty Red, Thin-C, Big Sloan Bone, Rocky Rock, Jeremy, Freaky G, Capone, Seldom Seen, Cat Cody, Flesh-n-Bone (who was on Def Jam until 1999) and others.

== Discography ==
- Family Scriptures (1996)
- Chapter II: Family Reunion (1998)
- Mo Thugs III: The Mothership (2000)
- The Movement (2003)
