= Layzie Bone =

American rapper (born 1975)

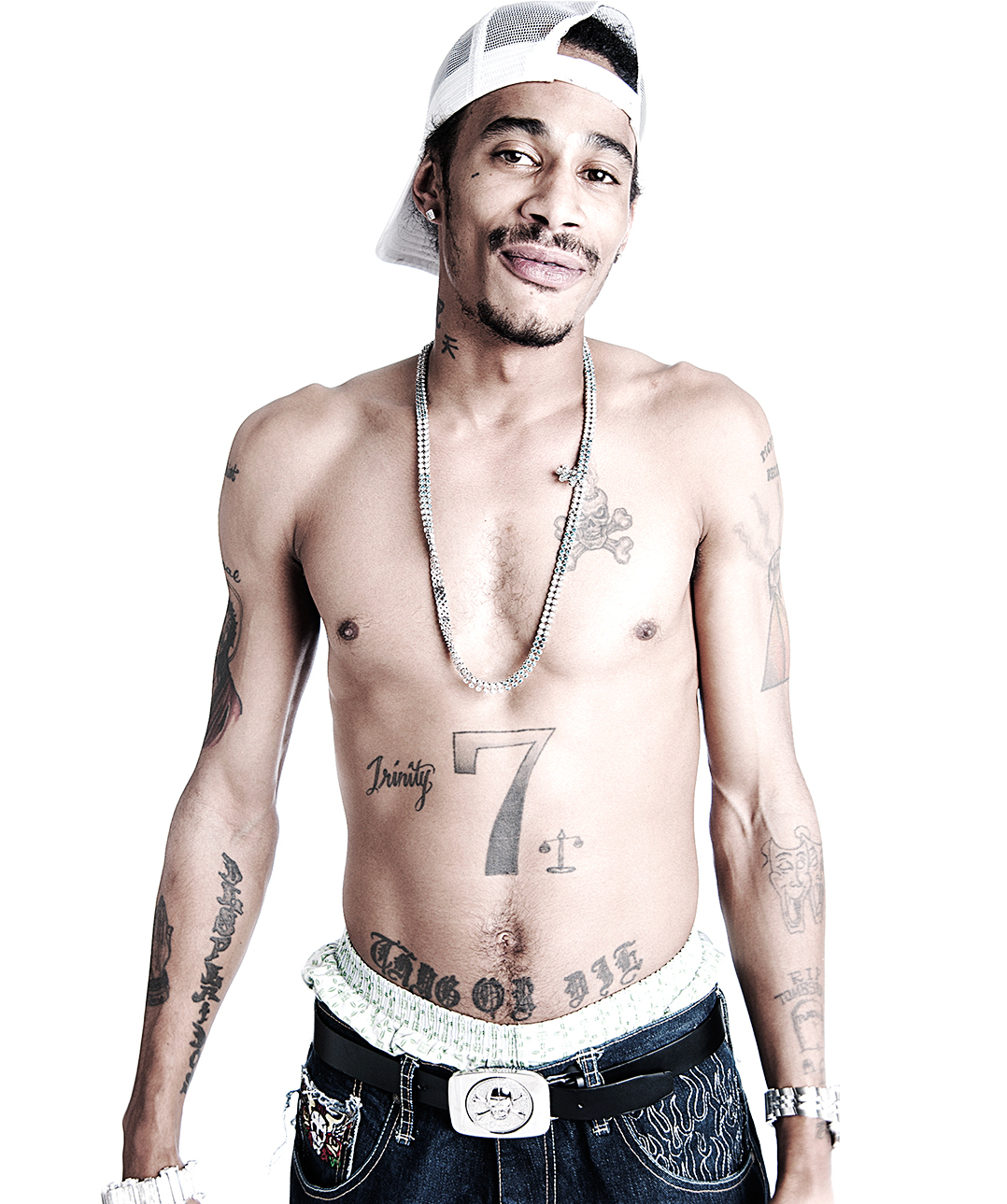
- Layzie Bone in 2007

Background information
- Also known as: The #1 Assassin; L-Burna; Lil' Layzie
- Born: Steven Howse; September 23, 1974 (age 51); Cleveland, Ohio, U.S.
- Genres: Hip-hop; gangsta rap
- Occupations: Rapper; singer; songwriter
- Years active: 1991–present
- Labels: Ruthless; Mo Thugs; BTNH Worldwide; Real Talk; RBC; Harmony Howse

Steven Howse (born September 23, 1974), known professionally as Layzie Bone, is an American rapper known primarily for being a member of the group Bone Thugs-n-Harmony. He has also gone by the names L-Burna, Lil Lay, and The #1 Assassin. He is the younger brother of fellow group member Flesh-N-Bone and cousin of group member Wish Bone. Layzie is also a member of the rap group Bone Brothers and CEO of the record label Harmony Howse Entertainment.

== Music career ==
The group formed the band B.O.N.E. Enterpri$e (all except for Flesh-N-Bone) and recorded an album entitled Faces of Death in the studio of their then-mentor, Kermit Henderson, on his indie label Stoney Burke in 1993. After this Layzie and the rest of the Bone Family boarded a Greyhound Bus to Los Angeles where they worked with notable producer and rapper Eazy-E and his Ruthless/Relativity Records label. Diego Blak (born Diego Hodge), a marketer and promoter and co-executive producer of Faces of Death, introduced them to Eazy-E at a concert he promoted in Cleveland, Ohio, where they auditioned for him in his dressing room and then traveled back to Los Angeles after the show to seal the deal. At this point Eazy named them Thugs-n-Harmony but they wanted to keep the Bone name so they were called Bone Thugs-N-Harmony.

=== Solo career, Mo Thugs & Bone Brothers ===
Layzie has also promoted the indie label Mo Thugs Records which he and the rest of Bone originated. He released his first solo album Thug By Nature on March 20, 2001, exactly the same day Bizzy Bone released his second solo album, The Gift. He also has collaborative albums with Young Noble from The Outlawz and A.K. of Do or Die, solo albums out such as It's Not A Game, The New Revolution, Cleveland, Startin' from Scratch: How A Thug Was Born, and Thugz Nation. He has had a series of albums with Bizzy Bone; Still Creepin On Ah Come Up and under the name Bone Brothers entitled: Bone Brothers, Bone Brothers 2, Bone Brothers 3.

=== New Label and CEO ===
In the fall of 2010, Layzie established a new label, Harmony Howse Entertainment. In 2011, he and Fredro Starr of the Onyx group were planning on releasing a collaborative EP entitled FireSquad. Layzie would go on to release two separate albums The Definition and The Meaning on February 22, 2011 under his new label Harmony Howse Entertainment. In 2015 Layzie released the single Cleveland is The City Featuring Aaron "D-Boyy" Dissell. The song was used by Fox News during the 2015 NBA Finals as the Cleveland Cavaliers theme song. Layzie was also working on an album called Perfect Timing, which was originally scheduled to be released in 2016, but is now TBD. Layzie is the uncle of the independent rapper, Dizzy Wright.

=== Feud with Migos ===
During a brief feud with Migos, Layzie Bone would release the album Annihilation on April 19, 2019, featuring the song If was a 5th featuring Bizzy Bone, and the diss song Let me go Migo (Remix).

== Discography ==
=== Studio albums ===
- Thug by Nature (2001)
- It's Not a Game (2005)
- The New Revolution (2006)
- Cleveland (2006)
- Startin' from Scratch: How a Thug Was Born (2007)
- Thugz Nation (2008)
- The Definition (2011)
- The Meaning (2011)
- Annihilation (2019)
- Lost & Found (2019)
- Wanted Dead or Alive (2020)
- Hypnotic Rhythms (2023)
- D.A.S.H. (2026)

=== Collaboration albums ===
- Bone Brothers with Bone Brothers (2005)
- Thug Brothers with Young Noble (2006)
- Bone Brothers 2 with Bone Brothers (2007)
- Bone Brothers III with Bone Brothers (2008)
- Still Creepin on Ah Come Up with Bone Brothers (2008)
- Finally with A.K. (2008)
- Thug Twinz with Big Sloan (2009)
- Eyez On The Prize with HC The Chemist (2021)
