= Roberta Flack discography =

Cataloging of published recordings by Roberta Flack

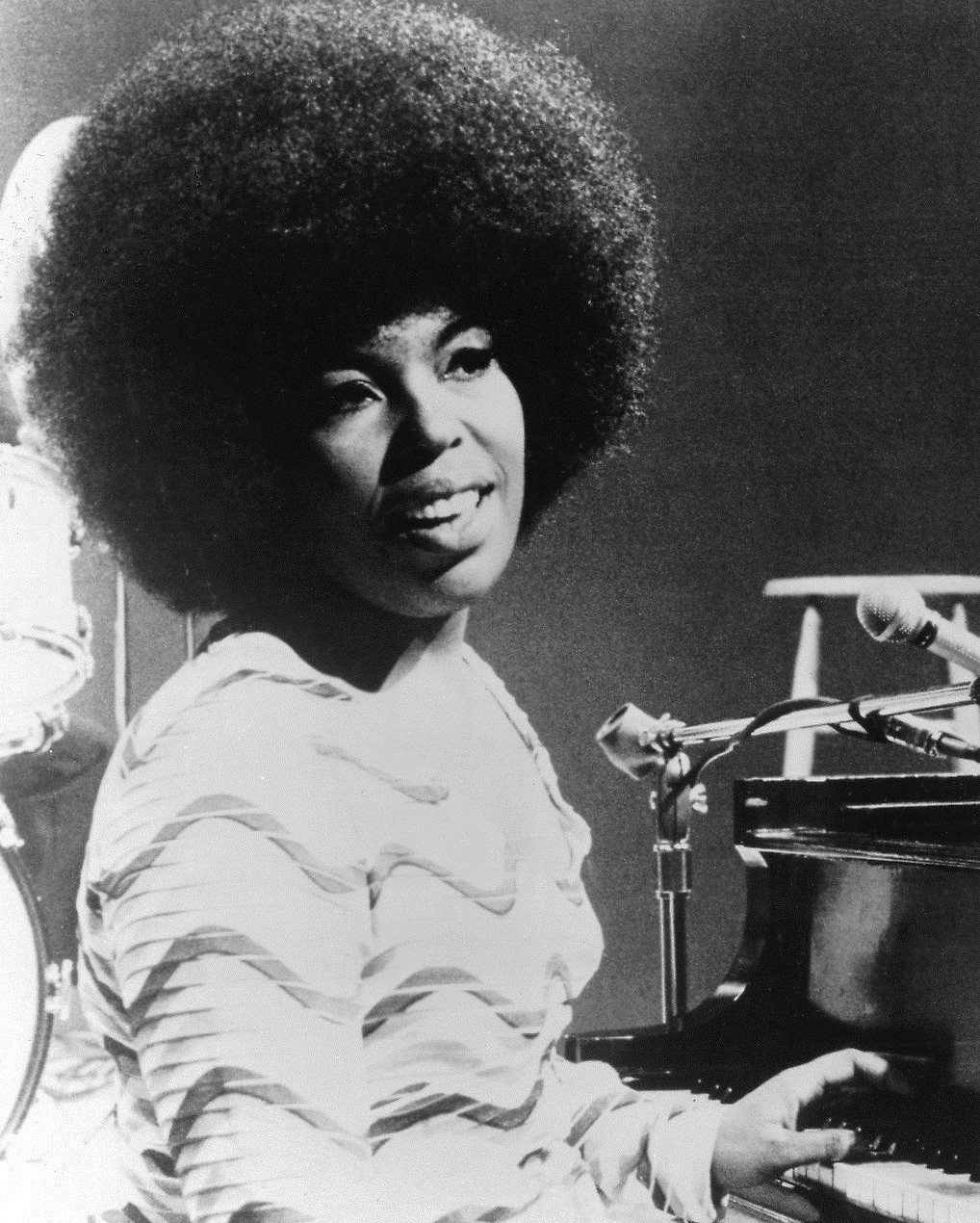
Roberta Flack, 1971

This discography documents albums and singles released by American recording artist Roberta Flack. As a solo artist, Flack hit number one on the Billboard Hot 100 record chart three times, with "Killing Me Softly with His Song," "Feel Like Making Love" and "The First Time Ever I Saw Your Face," which spent six weeks at the top of the chart in Spring 1972. "Killing Me Softly" won the 1974 Grammy Award for Record of the Year. She also had hits by collaborating with three male singers: Donny Hathaway ("Where Is The Love" and "The Closer I Get to You"), Peabo Bryson ("Tonight I Celebrate My Love") and Maxi Priest ("Set the Night to Music").

The Recording Industry Association of America certified three of Flack's albums as platinum and seven as gold. Her biggest selling album was "Killing Me Softly," released in 1973 on Atlantic Records.

== Albums ==
=== Studio albums ===
Year	Album	Peak chart positions									Certifications (sales threshold)	Record label
Year	Album	US	US R&B	US Jazz	AUS	CAN	NLD	NOR	NZ	UK	Certifications (sales threshold)	Record label
1969	First Take ^{[A]}	1	1	3	9	4	—	17	—	47	RIAA: Platinum; MC: Gold	Atlantic
1970	Chapter Two	33	4	2	29	49	—	—	—	—	RIAA: Gold	Atlantic
1971	Quiet Fire	18	4	5	—	—	—	—	—	—	RIAA: Gold	Atlantic
1972	Roberta Flack & Donny Hathaway	3	2	—	22	25	—	—	—	—	RIAA: Gold	Atlantic
1973	Killing Me Softly	3	2	—	11	13	9	6	—	40	RIAA: 2× Platinum; MC: Gold	Atlantic
1975	Feel Like Makin' Love	24	5	11	19	37	—	—	—	—		Atlantic
1977	Blue Lights in the Basement	8	5	—	88	9	—	—	—	—	RIAA: Gold	Atlantic
1978	Roberta Flack	74	37	—	—	75	—	—	—	—	BPI: Silver	Atlantic
1980	Roberta Flack Featuring Donny Hathaway	25	4	9	—	—	—	—	—	31	RIAA: Gold	Atlantic
1982	I'm the One	59	16	—	74	—	—	—	—	—		Atlantic
1983	Born to Love (with Peabo Bryson)	25	8	—	35	39	21	—	43	15	RIAA: Gold; BPI: Silver	Capitol
1988	Oasis	159	24	—	—	—	—	—	—	—		Atlantic
1991	Set the Night to Music	110	—	—	—	—	—	—	—	—		Atlantic
1992	Stop the World	—	—	—	—	—	—	—	—	—		Toshiba EMI
1994	Roberta	—	—	—	—	—	—	—	—	—		Atlantic
1997	The Christmas Album/Holiday	—	—	—	—	—	—	—	—	—		Capitol
1999	Friends: Roberta Flack Sings Mariko Takahashi	—	—	—	—	—	—	—	—	—		Victor Ent
2012	Let It Be Roberta: Roberta Flack Sings the Beatles	181	30	—	—	—	—	—	—	—		429
"—" denotes a recording that did not chart or was not released in that territory.

- ^{A} First Take reached its peak position in 1972.

=== Live albums ===
Year	Album	Peak chart positions		Record label
Year	Album	US	US R&B	Record label
1980	Live & More (with Peabo Bryson)	52	10	Atlantic
2008	At Her Best – Live (live video/audio recordings from 1975 and 2001; unauthorized release)	—	—	Immortal
2012	S.O.U.L. (live recordings from 1985 tour)	—	—	Sony Music

=== Soundtrack albums ===
Year	Album	Peak chart positions		Record label
Year	Album	US	US R&B	Record label
1981	Bustin' Loose	161	48	MCA

=== Compilation albums ===
Year	Album	Peak chart positions					Certifications	Record label
Year	Album	US	US R&B	AUS	NZ	UK	Certifications	Record label
1981	The Best of Roberta Flack	201	—	44	21	—	RIAA: Platinum; ARIA: 2× Platinum	Atlantic
1984	Greatest Hits	—	—	—	—	35		K-tel
1993	Softly with These Songs: The Best of Roberta Flack	—	—	—	24	7	RIAA: Gold; ARIA: Gold; BPI: Platinum	Atlantic
2006	The Very Best of Roberta Flack	—	—	41	—	50	BPI: Silver	Rhino
2011	Love Songs	—	—	—	—	20		Rhino
"—" denotes a recording that did not chart or was not released in that territory.

== Singles ==
Year	Single (A-side, B-side) Both sides from same album except where indicated	Peak chart positions										Certifications	Album
Year	Single (A-side, B-side) Both sides from same album except where indicated	US	US R&B	US AC	US Cash Box	US Dan.	AUS	CAN	NLD	NZ	UK	Certifications	Album
1969	"Compared to What" b/w "Hey, That's No Way to Say Goodbye"	—	—	—	—	—	—	—	—	—	—		First Take
1970	"How Many Broken Wings" b/w "Baby, Baby"; Both sides with Les McCann	—	—	—	—	—	—	—	—	—	—		Comment
1970	"Reverend Lee" b/w "Business Goes On as Usual"	—	—	—	125	—	—	—	—	—	—		Chapter Two
1971	"Do What You Gotta Do" b/w "Let It Be Me"	117	—	—	106	—	—	—	—	—			Chapter Two
1971	"You've Got a Friend" b/w "Gone Away" (from Chapter Two); Both sides with Donny Hathaway	29	8	36	28	—	—	82	—	—	—		Roberta Flack & Donny Hathaway
1971	"You've Lost That Lovin' Feelin'" b/w "Be Real Black for Me"; Both sides with Donny Hathaway	71	30	—	57	—	—	—	—	—	—		Roberta Flack & Donny Hathaway
1972	"Will You Still Love Me Tomorrow" b/w "Go Up Moses"	76	38	15	66	—	—	—	—	—	—		Quiet Fire
1972	"The First Time Ever I Saw Your Face" b/w "Trade Winds" (Non-album track)	1	4	1	1	—	1	1	9	—	14	RIAA: Gold; BPI: Platinum; RMNZ: Gold	First Take
1972	"Where Is the Love" b/w "Mood"; Both sides with Donny Hathaway	5	1	1	7	—	55	35	—	—	29	RIAA: Gold	Roberta Flack & Donny Hathaway
1973	"Killing Me Softly with His Song" b/w "Just Like a Woman" (from Chapter Two)	1	2	2	1	—	1	1	3	—	6	RIAA: Gold; BPI: Gold; RMNZ: Gold	Killing Me Softly
1973	"Jesse" b/w "No Tears (In the End)"	30	19	3	12	—	36	23	— (Note: "Jesse" did not enter the Dutch Top 40, but peaked at number 10 on the Dutch Top 40 Tipparade chart, which acts as a 'bubbling under' chart for songs which have not reached the top 40.)	—	—		Killing Me Softly
1974	"Feel Like Makin' Love" b/w "When You Smile" (from Killing Me Softly)	1	1	1	1	—	13	1	29	—	34	RIAA: Gold	Feel Like Makin' Love
1975	"Feelin' That Glow" b/w "Some Gospel According to Matthew"	76	25	38	65	—	—	79	—	—	—		Feel Like Makin' Love
1977	"25th of Last December" b/w "Why Don't You Move in with Me"	—	52	28	92	—	—	79	—	—	—		Blue Lights in the Basement
1978	"The Closer I Get to You" (with Donny Hathaway) b/w "Love Is the Healing"	2	1	3	2	—	—	1	—	16	42	RIAA: Gold	Blue Lights in the Basement
1978	"If Ever I See You Again" b/w "I'd Like to Be Baby to You" (from Blue Lights in the Basement)	24	37	1	38	—	—	26	—	—	—		Roberta Flack
1978	"When It's Over" b/w "Come Share My Love"	—	82	—	—	—	—	—	—	—	—		Roberta Flack
1979	"You Are Everything" b/w "Knowing That We're Made for Each Other"	—	98	—	—	—	—	—	—	—	—		Roberta Flack
1980	"You Are My Heaven" (with Donny Hathaway) b/w "I'll Love You Forever and Ever" (Non-album track)	47	8	46	78	—	—	—	—	—	—		Roberta Flack Featuring Donny Hathaway
1980	"Back Together Again" (with Donny Hathaway) b/w "God Don't Like Ugly"	56	8	—	91	6	—	—	—	—	3		Roberta Flack Featuring Donny Hathaway
1980	"Don't Make Me Wait Too Long" b/w "Only Heaven Can Wait (For Love)"	104	67	—	—	—	—	44	—	—	—		Roberta Flack Featuring Donny Hathaway
1980	"Make the World Stand Still" (with Peabo Bryson) b/w "Only Heaven Can Wait (For Love)"	—	13	—	—	—	—	—	—	—	—		Live & More
1981	"Love Is a Waiting Game" b/w "More Than Everything"; Both sides with Peabo Bryson	—	46	—	—	—	—	—	—	—	—		Live & More
1981	"You Stopped Loving Me" b/w "Qual E Malindrinho"	108	32	—	—	—	—	—	—	—	—		Bustin' Loose soundtrack
1981	"Lovin' You (Is Such an Easy Thang to Do)" b/w "Hittin' Me Where It Hurts"	—	—	—	—	—	—	—	—	—	—		Bustin' Loose soundtrack
1982	"Making Love" b/w "Jesse" (from Killing Me Softly)	13	29	7	14	—	63	43	—	—	—		I'm the One
1982	"I'm the One" b/w "'Til the Morning Comes"	42	24	10	36	—	—	4	—	—	—	—	I'm the One
1982	"In the Name of Love" b/w "Happiness"	—	80	24	—	—	—	—	—	—	—		I'm the One
1982	"Our Love Will Stop the World" (with Eric Mercury) b/w "Only Heaven Can Wait (For Love)" (from Live & More)	—	65	—	—	—	—	—	—	—	—		Non-album track
1983	"This Side of Forever"; B-side by The Enforcers: "Robbery Suspects"	—	—	—	—	—	—	—	—	—	—		Sudden Impact and The Best of Dirty Harry (soundtrack)
1983	"Remember When (So Much in Love)" (with Peabo Bryson); B-side by Peabo Bryson: "Don't Play with Fire"	—	—	—	—	—	—	—	—	—	—		Don't Play with Fire
1983	"Tonight, I Celebrate My Love" b/w "Born to Love"; Both sides with Peabo Bryson	16	5	4	14	—	10	4	6	11	2	MC: Gold; BPI: Silver	Born to Love
1983	"Maybe" b/w "Can We Find Love Again"; Both sides with Peabo Bryson	—	68	—	—	—	—	—	—	—	—		Born to Love
1983	"You're Lookin' Like Love to Me" (with Peabo Bryson); B-side by Peabo Bryson: "Let Me Be the One You Need" (Non-album track)	58	41	5	67	—	—	—	—	—	—		Born to Love
1983	"Heaven Above Me" b/w "Can We Find Love Again"; Both sides with Peabo Bryson	—	—	—	—	—	—	—	—	—	84		Born to Love
1984	"I Just Came Here to Dance" b/w "Can We Find Love Again"; Both sides with Peabo Bryson	—	—	15	—	—	—	—	—	—	—		Born to Love
1984	"If I'm Still Around Tomorrow" (with Sadao Watanabe); B-side by Sadao Wantanabe: "West Side Drive"	—	79	31	—	—	—	—	—	—	—		Rendezvous
1986	"We Shall Overcome" b/w "Let Me Be a Light to Shine" (with Howard Hewett)	—	—	—	—	—	—	—	—	—	—		Non-album track
1988	"Oasis" b/w "You Know What It's Like"	—	1	13	—	—	—	—	—	—	—		Oasis
1989	"Uh-Uh Ooh-Ooh Look Out" b/w "You Know What It's Like"	—	37	—	—	1	—	—	—	—	72		Oasis
1989	"Shock to My System" b/w "You Know What It's Like"	—	—	—	—	—	—	—	—	—	—		Oasis
1991	"Set the Night to Music" (with Maxi Priest) b/w "Natural Thing"	6	45	2	5	—	80	9	—	50	76		Set the Night to Music
1992	"You Make Me Feel Brand New"; CD single with two versions	—	50	—	—	—	—	—	—	—	—		Set the Night to Music
1996	"Killing Me Softly with His Song" (Reborn Club Vox); 12" record with four additional mixes	—	—	—	—	1	—	—	—	—	—		Non-album track
1997	"The Christmas Song" b/w "25th Of Last December"	—	—	—	—	—	—	—	—	—	—		The Christmas Album
2010	"The First Time Ever I Saw Your Face" (UK re-release)	—	—	—	—	—	—	—	—	—	47		Love Songs
2011	"We Can Work It Out"; CD single with two versions	—	—	—	—	—	—	—	—	—	—		Let It Be Roberta: Roberta Flack Sings The Beatles
2018	"Running"; CD single	—	—	—	—	—	—	—	—	—	—		Non-album track
2021	"What's Going On"; Previously unreleased 1971 recording of Marvin Gaye's song	—	—	—	—	—	—	—	—	—	—		Quiet Fire (50th Anniversary Edition)
"—" denotes a recording that did not chart or was not released in that territory.

== Other charted songs ==
Title	Year	Peak chart positions	Album
Title	Year	JPN	Album
"In My Life"	2012	39	Let It Be Roberta

== Guest appearances ==
With Les McCann

- Comment (Atlantic, 1970)
