= Softly with These Songs: The Best of Roberta Flack =

1993 compilation album by Roberta Flack

Greatest hits album by Roberta Flack
- Released: June 22, 1993
- Genre: R&B; soul
- Length: 76:09
- Label: Atlantic

Roberta Flack chronology
Set the Night to Music (1991)	Softly with These Songs: The Best of Roberta Flack (1993)	Roberta (1994)

Professional ratings
Review scores
Source	Rating
AllMusic	4.5/5 stars

Softly with These Songs: The Best of Roberta Flack is the third compilation album by American singer Roberta Flack, released in 1993.

== Track listing ==
No.	Title	Writer(s)	Original album	Length
1.	"The First Time Ever I Saw Your Face"	Ewan MacColl	First Take (1969)	5:20
2.	"Will You Still Love Me Tomorrow"	Carole King; Gerry Goffin	Quiet Fire (1971)	4:07
3.	"Where Is the Love" (duet with Donny Hathaway)	Ralph MacDonald; William Salter	Roberta Flack & Donny Hathaway (1972)	2:43
4.	"Killing Me Softly with His Song"	Charles Fox; Norman Gimbel	Killing Me Softly (1973)	4:46
5.	"Feel Like Makin' Love"	Eugene McDaniels	Feel Like Makin' Love (1975)	2:53
6.	"The Closer I Get to You" (duet with Donny Hathaway)	Reggie Lucas; James Mtume	Blue Lights in the Basement (1977)	4:40
7.	"More Than Everything" (duet with Peabo Bryson)	Peabo Bryson; Roberta Flack	Live & More (1980)	4:02
8.	"Only Heaven Can Wait (For Love)" (duet with Peabo Bryson)	Flack; Eric Mercury	Live & More	5:47
9.	"Back Together Again" (duet with Donny Hathaway)	Lucas; Mtume	Roberta Flack Featuring Donny Hathaway (1980)	4:50
10.	"Making Love"	Burt Bacharach; Carole Bayer Sager; Bruce Roberts	I'm the One (1982)	3:43
11.	"Tonight, I Celebrate My Love" (duet with Peabo Bryson)	Goffin; Michael Masser	Born to Love (1983)	3:31
12.	"Oasis"	Marcus Miller; Mark Stephens	Oasis (1988)	6:10
13.	"And So It Goes"	Flack; Barry Miles; Maya Angelou	Oasis	3:35
14.	"You Know What It's Like"	Flack; Brenda Russell; Miles	Oasis	4:44
15.	"Set the Night to Music" (duet with Maxi Priest)	Diane Warren	Set the Night to Music (1991)	5:24
16.	"My Foolish Heart"	Ned Washington; Victor Young	Set the Night to Music	4:41
17.	"Uh-Uh Ooh-Ooh Look Out (Here It Comes)" (Steve Hurley's House Mix)	Nickolas Ashford; Valerie Simpson	This version was a 1989 single (Original song from Oasis)	5:13
Total length:				76:09

All track information and credits were taken from the CD liner notes.

== Charts ==
Chart (1993)	Peak position
UK Albums (OCC)	7

== Certifications ==
Region	Certification	Certified units/sales
Australia (ARIA)	Gold	35,000^{^}
United Kingdom (BPI)	Platinum	300,000^{^}
^{^} Shipments figures based on certification alone.
