= The Very Best of Roberta Flack =

Greatest hits album by Roberta Flack
- Released: 2006
- Genre: R&B, soul
- Label: Rhino

Roberta Flack chronology
Holiday (2003)	The Very Best of Roberta Flack (2006)	At Her Best - Live (2008)

Professional ratings
Review scores
Source	Rating
allmusic	4.5/5 stars

The Very Best of Roberta Flack is a greatest hits album from Roberta Flack, spanning songs from her entire career, and released on Rhino Records in 2006. In his review of the album, Rob Theakston of Allmusic says it "is easily the best retrospective of her work available to date."

== Track listing ==
No.	Title	Writer(s)	Length
1.	"Killing Me Softly with His Song"	Charles Fox; Norman Gimbel	4:47
2.	"Where Is the Love" (duet with Donny Hathaway)	Ralph MacDonald; William Salter	2:43
3.	"Feel Like Makin' Love"	Gene McDaniels	2:55
4.	"The First Time Ever I Saw Your Face"	Ewan MacColl	5:22
5.	"And So It Goes"	Roberta Flack; Maya Angelou; Barry Miles	3:36
6.	"Tonight, I Celebrate My Love" (duet with Peabo Bryson)	Gerry Goffin; Michael Masser	3:29
7.	"The Closer I Get to You" (duet with Donny Hathaway)	James Mtume; Reggie Lucas	4:38
8.	"'Til the Morning Comes"	Casey Daniels; Ralph MacDonald; William Salter	3:44
9.	"Back Together Again" (duet with Donny Hathaway)	Reggie Lucas; James Mtume	6:51
10.	"Making Love"	Burt Bacharach; Bruce Roberts; Carole Bayer Sager	3:41
11.	"Only Heaven Can Wait (For Love)" (feat. Donny Hathaway)	Roberta Flack; Eric Mercury	4:02
12.	"Set the Night to Music" (duet with Maxi Priest)	Diane Warren	5:19
13.	"You Are My Heaven" (duet with Donny Hathaway)	Eric Mercury; Stevie Wonder	4:10
14.	"Oasis"	Marcus Miller; Mark Stephens	6:09
15.	"Don't Make Me Wait Too Long" (feat. Donny Hathaway)	Stevie Wonder	7:44
16.	"And So It Goes (Reprise)"	Roberta Flack; Maya Angelou; Barry Miles	0:59
17.	"Trade Winds" (Tom Moulton mix)	Ralph MacDonald; William Salter	6:50
Total length:			1:17:08

== Certifications ==
Certifications for The Very Best of Roberta Flack
Region	Certification	Certified units/sales
United Kingdom (BPI)	Silver	60,000^{‡}
^{‡} Sales+streaming figures based on certification alone.
