= Makin' Love (disambiguation) =

"Makin' Love" is a song by Floyd Robinson.

Makin' Love may also refer to:

== Songs ==
- "Makin' Love", by Kiss, from the album Rock and Roll Over
- "Makin' Love", by Rainbow, from the album Down to Earth

== See also ==
- Feel Like Makin' Love (disambiguation)
