= Killing Me Softly (Roberta Flack album) =

Studio album by Roberta Flack
- Released: August 1, 1973
- Studios: Regent Sound, New York City; Atlantic, New York City
- Genres: Soul; blues; R&B
- Length: 40:57
- Label: Atlantic
- Producer: Joel Dorn

Roberta Flack chronology
Roberta Flack & Donny Hathaway (1972)	Killing Me Softly (1973)	Feel Like Makin' Love (1975)

Singles from Killing Me Softly
- 1. "Killing Me Softly with His Song" Released: January 21, 1973; 2. "Jesse" Released: November 8, 1973

Killing Me Softly is the fourth studio album by American singer-songwriter Roberta Flack, released on August 1, 1973, by Atlantic Records. She recorded the album with producer Joel Dorn for 18 months. The album was dedicated to Rahsaan Roland Kirk.

Killing Me Softly reached number three on the Billboard Top LPs & Tape and number two on the Soul LPs chart. The Recording Industry Association of America (RIAA) certified the album gold on August 27, 1973, and double platinum on January 30, 2006, denoting shipments of two million copies in the United States. It was nominated for a Grammy Award for Album of the Year, which it lost to Stevie Wonder's 1973 album Innervisions. The album's title track was released as a single and topped the Billboard Hot 100. It won the 1974 Grammy Award for Record of the Year.

"Jesse", the follow-up single to the title track, reached number 30 on the Billboard Hot 100. Record World called the single a "gorgeous Janis Ian tune [...] impeccably produced by Joel Dorn."

== Critical reception ==
Professional ratings
Review scores
Source	Rating
AllMusic	4.5/5 stars

Reviewing for the Chicago Tribune in September 1973, Clarence Page said Killing Me Softly has a hit title track and "other potential hits, adding up to one of [Flack's] better albums". John S. Wilson, writing in The New York Times, felt that Flack and producer Joel Dorn "have resisted the pitfalls of overproducing that you would suppose such a long gestation period would induce". Billboard called the record a "delicate, introspective work" by Flack, whom the magazine deemed a "masterful interpreter of clean lyrics fusing a sophisticated pop sound with that dark side of the blues".

Robert Christgau was less impressed in a December 1973 column for Creem, giving Killing Me Softly a "C" while comparing Flack negatively to Jesse Colin Young because she also "always makes you wonder whether she's going to fall asleep before you do". In a retrospective review, The Rolling Stone Album Guide (1992) gave the record two-and-a-half out of five stars and found its music "innocuous". AllMusic's Ron Wynn later gave it four and a half stars, writing that the album "continued in the same tradition as Chapter Two and Quiet Fire", featuring "simmering ballads, declarative message songs, and better-than-average up-tempo numbers".

== Track listing ==
Killing Me Softly track listing
No.	Title	Writer(s)	Length
1.	"Killing Me Softly with His Song"	Charles Fox; Norman Gimbel; Lori Lieberman (uncredited)	4:49
2.	"Jesse"	Janis Ian	4:03
3.	"No Tears (In the End)"	Ralph MacDonald; William Salter	4:56
4.	"I'm the Girl"	James Alan Shelton	4:55
5.	"River"	Gene McDaniels	5:03
6.	"Conversation Love"	Terry Plumeri; Bill Seighman	3:43
7.	"When You Smile"	MacDonald; Salter	3:44
8.	"Suzanne"	Leonard Cohen	9:44
Total length:			40:57

== Personnel ==
Credits are adapted from AllMusic.

Performers and musicians

- Roberta Flack – vocals, piano, rhythm track arrangements
- Eric Gale – guitar
- Ron Carter – bass guitar
- Grady Tate – drums
- Ralph MacDonald – congas, percussion, tambourine
- Kermit Moore – cello (4), cello arrangements (4)
- Eumir Deodato – string arrangements and conductor (2, 8)
- Alfred "Pee Wee" Ellis – brass arrangements and conductor (3)
- William Eaton – horn arrangements (5, 7)
- Don Sebesky – horn and string arrangements (6), conductor (6)

Technical

- Joel Dorn – producer
- Jack Shaw – associate producer
- Gene Paul – engineer and remix (1)
- Bob Liftin – engineer and remix (2–8)
- Barry Diament – mastering
- Shorewood Graphics – design concept
- Rod Dyer – design
- Burt Goldblatt – backliner photography
- David Redfern – inside photography

== Charts ==
Weekly chart performance for Killing Me Softly
Chart (1973)	Peak position
Dutch Albums (Album Top 100)	9
German Albums (Offizielle Top 100)	47
Norwegian Albums (VG-lista)	6
UK Albums (Official Charts)	40
US Billboard 200	3
US Top R&B/Hip-Hop Albums (Billboard)	2
Chart (2025)	Peak position
UK Album Downloads (Official Charts)	94

== Certifications ==
Certifications for "Killing Me Softly"
Region	Certification	Certified units/sales
Canada (Music Canada)	Gold	50,000^{^}
United States (RIAA)	2× Platinum	2,000,000^{^}
^{^} Shipments figures based on certification alone.
