= Roberta Flack & Donny Hathaway =

Studio album by Roberta Flack and Donny Hathaway
- Released: April 1972
- Recorded: March–October 1971
- Studios: Regent Sound, New York City; Atlantic, New York City
- Genres: R&B, soul, pop
- Length: 42:36
- Label: Atlantic
- Producers: Joel Dorn; Arif Mardin

Roberta Flack chronology
Quiet Fire (1971)	Roberta Flack & Donny Hathaway (1972)	Killing Me Softly (1973)

Donny Hathaway chronology
Come Back, Charleston Blue (1972)	Roberta Flack & Donny Hathaway (1972)	Extension of a Man (1973)

Singles from Roberta Flack & Donny Hathaway
- 1. "You've Got a Friend / Gone Away" Released: May 9, 1971; 2. "You've Lost That Lovin' Feelin' / Be Real Black for Me" Released: September 25, 1971; 3. "Where Is the Love / Mood" Released: April 17, 1972

Professional ratings
Review scores
Source	Rating
AllMusic	4/5 stars

Roberta Flack & Donny Hathaway is a collaborative studio album between American singers Roberta Flack and Donny Hathaway, released by Atlantic Records in April 1972 and produced by Joel Dorn and Arif Mardin.

Flack and Hathaway were both solo artists on the Atlantic roster who'd enjoyed critical acclaim, but Flack had enjoyed limited commercial success. Both had attended Howard University, although Flack's attendance there pre-dated Hathaway's. The singers' careers had overlapped, however: Flack had included Hathaway compositions on her First Take and Chapter Two albums, with the latter also featuring Hathaway as pianist, arranger and background vocalist. It was Jerry Wexler who suggested that a joint venture might consolidate Flack and Hathaway's popularity.

The lead single from Roberta Flack & Donny Hathaway was a version of "You've Got a Friend" recorded before the single release of the James Taylor version. Both tracks debuted on the Hot 100 almost simultaneously - Taylor version debuted on June 5, 1971, whereas Flack/Hathaway version debuted the following week (June 12, 1971) — marking Flack's first chart appearance — and, although Taylor's version reached #1, the Flack/Hathaway duet ascended as high as #29 and was a top ten R&B hit at #8. (The B-side, "Gone Away", was a Chapter Two track written by Hathaway.)

The second single from the duets album was a remake of the Righteous Brothers' "You've Lost That Lovin' Feelin'" that became a #30 R&B hit, peaking on the Hot 100 at #71.

It was the album's third and final single "Where Is the Love" — also released in April 1972 — would be the smash hit, largely due to Flack having had her solo career breakthrough with "The First Time Ever I Saw Your Face". "Where Is the Love" hit #5 on the Billboard Hot 100 and won for the duo a Grammy Award for Best Pop Performance by a Duo or Group with Vocals at the 15th Annual Grammy Awards in 1973.

Although Hathaway had enjoyed more solo success than had Flack prior to their teaming up, his subsequent solo career was desultory, with no high-profile success prior to his re-teaming with Flack for "The Closer I Get to You" in 1978. Hathaway had recorded two songs for a second duet album with Flack — that became the Roberta Flack Featuring Donny Hathaway album — at the time of his death on January 13, 1979.

== Track listing ==
Side One

1. "I (Who Have Nothing)" (Jerry Leiber, Mike Stoller, Carlo Donida) - 5:00
2. "You've Got a Friend" (Carole King) - 3:24
3. "Baby I Love You" (Ronnie Shannon) - 3:24
4. "Be Real Black for Me" (Charles Mann, Donny Hathaway, Roberta Flack) - 3:30
5. "You've Lost That Lovin' Feelin'" (Barry Mann, Phil Spector, Cynthia Weil) - 6:36

Side Two

1. "For All We Know" (J. Fred Coots, Sam M. Lewis) - 3:38
2. "Where Is the Love" (Ralph MacDonald, William Salter) - 2:43
3. "When Love Has Grown" (Donny Hathaway, Eugene McDaniels) - 3:31
4. "Come Ye Disconsolate" (Thomas Moore, Samuel Webbe, Sr.) - 4:50
5. "Mood" (Roberta Flack) - 7:00

== Personnel ==
- Roberta Flack – music arrangements, vocals (1–5, 7, 8, 9), electric piano (1), acoustic piano (5, 6, 10), organ (9)
- Donny Hathaway – music arrangements, vocals (1–9), acoustic piano (1, 3, 4, 8, 9), electric piano (2, 4, 5, 7, 8, 10), horn and string arrangements (4, 8)
- Eric Gale – guitar (1, 3–9)
- David Spinozza – guitar (2)
- Chuck Rainey – electric bass (1–9)
- Bernard Purdie – drums (1, 3–9)
- Billy Cobham – drums (2)
- Ralph MacDonald – percussion (1–9)
- Jack Jennings – vibraphone (7)
- Joe Gentle – flute (2)
- Hubert Laws – flute (8)
- Joe Farrell – soprano saxophone (5)
- Arif Mardin – string arrangements (1, 2, 5, 6, 7), woodwind arrangements (6, 7)

=== Production ===
- Arif Mardin – producer, mixing
- Joel Dorn – producer
- Jimmy Douglass – recording engineer (1, 3–10), mixing
- Lew Hahn – recording engineer (2)
- Gene Paul – additional recording
- Jeff Blue – album design, photography

== Charts ==
Chart (1972)	Peak position
Australia (Kent Music Report)	22
