= Feel Like Makin' Love =

Feel Like Makin' Love may refer to:

- Feel Like Makin' Love (album), a 1974 album by Roberta Flack
  - "Feel Like Makin' Love" (Roberta Flack song), its title track
- "Feel Like Makin' Love" (Bad Company song), a 1975 song by Bad Company
