= List of Billboard 200 number-one albums of 1972 =

These are the Billboard magazine number-one albums of 1972, per the Billboard 200.

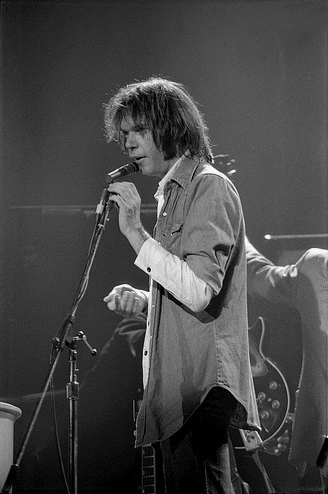
Neil Young's Harvest was the best-selling album of 1972.

== Chart history ==
Key
†	Indicates best performing album of 1972

Issue date	Album	Artist(s)	Label	Ref.
January 1	Music	Carole King	Ode 70	
January 8	Music	Carole King	Ode 70	
January 15	Music	Carole King	Ode 70	
January 22	American Pie	Don McLean	United Artists	
January 29	American Pie	Don McLean	United Artists	
February 5	American Pie	Don McLean	United Artists	
February 12	American Pie	Don McLean	United Artists	
February 19	American Pie	Don McLean	United Artists	
February 26	American Pie	Don McLean	United Artists	
March 4	American Pie	Don McLean	United Artists	
March 11	Harvest †	Neil Young	Reprise	
March 18	Harvest †	Neil Young	Reprise	
March 25	America	America	Warner Bros.	
April 1	America	America	Warner Bros.	
April 8	America	America	Warner Bros.	
April 15	America	America	Warner Bros.	
April 22	America	America	Warner Bros.	
April 29	First Take	Roberta Flack	Atlantic	
May 6	First Take	Roberta Flack	Atlantic	
May 13	First Take	Roberta Flack	Atlantic	
May 20	First Take	Roberta Flack	Atlantic	
May 27	First Take	Roberta Flack	Atlantic	
June 3	Thick as a Brick	Jethro Tull	Reprise	
June 10	Thick as a Brick	Jethro Tull	Reprise	
June 17	Exile on Main St.	The Rolling Stones	Rolling Stones	
June 24	Exile on Main St.	The Rolling Stones	Rolling Stones	
July 1	Exile on Main St.	The Rolling Stones	Rolling Stones	
July 8	Exile on Main St.	The Rolling Stones	Rolling Stones	
July 15	Honky Château	Elton John	Uni	
July 22	Honky Château	Elton John	Uni	
July 29	Honky Château	Elton John	Uni	
August 5	Honky Château	Elton John	Uni	
August 12	Honky Château	Elton John	Uni	
August 19	Chicago V	Chicago	Columbia	
August 26	Chicago V	Chicago	Columbia	
September 2	Chicago V	Chicago	Columbia	
September 9	Chicago V	Chicago	Columbia	
September 16	Chicago V	Chicago	Columbia	
September 23	Chicago V	Chicago	Columbia	
September 30	Chicago V	Chicago	Columbia	
October 7	Chicago V	Chicago	Columbia	
October 14	Chicago V	Chicago	Columbia	
October 21	Super Fly	Curtis Mayfield / Soundtrack	Curtom	
October 28	Super Fly	Curtis Mayfield / Soundtrack	Curtom	
November 4	Super Fly	Curtis Mayfield / Soundtrack	Curtom	
November 11	Super Fly	Curtis Mayfield / Soundtrack	Curtom	
November 18	Catch Bull at Four	Cat Stevens	A&M	
November 25	Catch Bull at Four	Cat Stevens	A&M	
December 2	Catch Bull at Four	Cat Stevens	A&M	
December 9	Seventh Sojourn	The Moody Blues	Threshold	
December 16	Seventh Sojourn	The Moody Blues	Threshold	
December 23	Seventh Sojourn	The Moody Blues	Threshold	
December 30	Seventh Sojourn	The Moody Blues	Threshold	

== See also ==
- 1972 in music
- List of number-one albums (United States)
