= First Take =

First Take may refer to:

- First Take (album), a 1969 record album by Roberta Flack
- First Take (TV series), a television program on ESPN
- The First Take, a Japanese musical YouTube channel
