= Terry Plumeri =

American musician, composer, conductor, lecturer, and producer

- Also known as: Don Plumeri, JohnTerryl Plumeri
- Born: John Terryl Plumeri; November 28, 1944; Greensboro, North Carolina, U.S.
- Died: March 31, 2016 (aged 71) Dunnellon, Florida, U.S.
- Genres: Contemporary classical; jazz; pop; film score
- Occupations: Composer; conductor; musician
- Instruments: Double bass; piano; flute
- Years active: 1963–2016

Don Terryl "Terry" Plumeri (born John Terryl Plumeri; November 28, 1944 – March 31, 2016) was an American composer, conductor, and jazz musician.

== Early life ==
Plumeri was born in Greensboro, North Carolina, and grew up in Tampa, Florida. He began studying music when he was 10. While attending Chamberlain High School, he was introduced to the double bass by band director Robert Price. He attended the Manhattan School of Music in New York City, studying with Robert Brennand, then the principal bassist in the New York Philharmonic. Later, he studied composition and conducting with Antal Doráti. During his military service, he was a member of the Air Force Band.

== Career ==
Plumeri played with many jazz greats including John Abercrombie, Cannonball Adderley, Herbie Hancock, Woody Herman, Quincy Jones, Yusef Lateef, Les McCann, Wayne Shorter, Frank Sinatra, Ralph Towner, and Joe Williams. He performed at many famous venues including Carnegie Hall (NYC); Royal Albert Hall (London); Odeon of Herodes Atticus (Athens), Tchaikovsky Concert Hall (Moscow), as well as the Newport, Monterey, and Montreux jazz festivals.

He performed, toured, and recorded with Roberta Flack from 1969 to 1974, playing electric and acoustic bass. He appears on the albums Chapter Two, Killing Me Softly and Quiet Fire. In addition, he wrote the song "Conversation Love" on the album Killing Me Softly.

In later years, he was guest conductor for the Moscow Philharmonic Orchestra and was a frequent guest lecturer, teacher, music producer, and photographer.

=== Film scoring ===
Later, he moved to Los Angeles to work in the film industry. He was a house composer for Roger Corman's New Concorde Pictures during the late 1980s/early 1990s.

He wrote the music for over 50 feature films, including the Stephen King adaptation Sometimes They Come Back, the Jean-Claude Van Damme/Sho Kosugi action film Black Eagle, Death Wish V: The Face of Death with Charles Bronson, the crime thriller One False Move. His score for One False Move, composed with former Climax Blues Band members Pete Haycock and Derek Holt, was nominated for Best Original Score at the 8th Independent Spirit Awards.

== Personal life ==
Plumeri was married to Kelly Green, with whom he had a daughter and a granddaughter.

=== Death ===
On the early morning of April 1, 2016, police responded to a well-being check at Plumeri's home in Dunnellon, Florida. Officers found him dead, with signs of extensive upper body trauma. Early speculation was that his death was a result of a home invasion, possibly linked to a series of such crimes in Citrus County.

In December, Jessica Baker and Darren Decker were subsequently charged with Plumeri's murder. Decker committed suicide while in custody in March 2017. In April 2018, Baker was found guilty and sentenced to 50-years in prison, served concurrently with a 30-year sentencing on separate charges.

== Discography ==
- He Who Lives in Many Places (1971)
- Ongoing (1978) Re-released on CD as "Water Garden" (2007)
- Plumeri Conducts Plumeri (1994)
- Film Music of Terry Plumeri (1994)
- Tchaikovsky/Plumeri/Moscow (1998)
- Blue In Green (2005)
- Sand Without Water (2010)
- Tchaikovsky Symphonies 4, 5, & 6/Johnterryl Plumeri-Conductor (2007)
- Chamber Music of Johnterryl Plumeri - Vol. 1 (2009)
- Johnterryl Plumeri and The Moscow Philharmonic Live at Tchaikovsky Hall (2012)

== Filmography ==
- Black Eagle (1988)
- Scarecrows (1988)
- Sometimes They Come Back (1991)
- Lower Level (1991)
- One False Move (1992)
- Stepmonster (1993)
- Teenage Bonnie and Kelpto Clyde (1993)
- Night Eyes 3 (1993)
- Death Wish V: The Face of Death (1994)
- Angel of Destruction (1994)
- Raging Angels (1995)
- Mr. Atlas (1997)
- Black Sea Raid (2000)
- Route 666 (2001)
- Knight Club (2001)
- Nate and the Colonel (2003)
- Love Takes Wing (2009)
- Zero Option (2014)
