= Feel Like Makin' Love (album) =

Studio album by Roberta Flack
- Released: March 1975
- Studio: Hit Factory (New York City); Bell Sound (New York City); Soundtek (New York City)
- Genre: Jazz; soul; folk
- Length: 46:34
- Label: Atlantic
- Producer: Rubina Flake

Roberta Flack chronology
Killing Me Softly (1973)	Feel Like Makin' Love (1975)	Blue Lights in the Basement (1977)

Singles from Feel Like Makin' Love
- 1. "Feel Like Makin' Love"/"When You Smile" Released: May 11, 1974; 2. "Feelin' That Glow"/"Some Gospel According to Matthew" Released: May 17, 1975

Feel Like Makin' Love is the fifth studio album by American singer Roberta Flack. It was released by Atlantic Records in March 1975 in the United States. Recorded after the release of her duet album with Donny Hathaway, Roberta Flack & Donny Hathaway (1972), it marked the singer's first album to be produced by Flack herself, under the pseudonym Rubina Flake.

== Background ==
The album's title cut had been issued as a single in May 1974, affording Flack her third number one hit on the US Billboard Hot 100, after which success Atlantic Records signed Flack to a new five-year contract – reportedly the most lucrative ever signed by a female recording artist. By September 1974, Feel Like Makin' Love had reportedly already accrued enough advance orders from retail outlets to guarantee gold status upon the album's release, which was expected in November 1974.

== Recording ==
Feel Like Makin' Love would not be ready for release until March 1975, having taken fourteen months to record. Although Flack had self-produced the "Feel Like Makin' Love" single, she began recording the album with her regular producer Joel Dorn. Unhappy when Flack recruited "Feel Like Makin' Love" co-writer Gene McDaniels as an additional producer, Dorn withdrew from the album and after Flack and McDaniels proved unable to establish an agreeable working relationship, Flack was left to produce her album alone.

Although Flack had worked closely with Dorn in the recording of her previous albums, the singer found the task of producing an entire album by herself an arduous challenge. She later commented on the process: "I made a lot of mistakes. It was a very hard time for me. There were days when I just cried and cried. But you press on. You press on." Upon the belated release of Feel Like Makin' Love, Flack admitted that Atlantic Records was discontented with the time and expense spent on the album: "The [high price tag] is misleading. Some material I recorded will be used on my next two albums [which] I will be able to finish [...] very quickly and [cost efficiently]." In fact, Flack's next album Blue Lights in the Basement would not be ready for release until December 1977 – thirty-three months after the release of Feel Like Makin' Love.

== Critical reception ==
Professional ratings
Review scores
Source	Rating
AllMusic	3/5 stars

In a retrospective review for AllMusic, Stephen Cook rated the album three out of five stars and wrote: "Maybe not as fine an album as 1971's Quiet Fire, Feel Like Making Love will still please the singer's dedicated fans." He found that "Flack never quite hit the heights of this and the handful of other MOR soul releases from the first half of the decade. Her Carole King-meets-Gladys Knight sound is particularly impressive on highlights like "Mr. Magic" and "Feelin' That Glow"."

== Track listing ==
Feel Like Makin' Love track listing
No.	Title	Writer(s)	Length
1.	"Feelin' That Glow"	Bob Fusco; Sister Charlotte Laws; Gene McDaniels; Maurice McKinley; Leon Pendarvis	5:48
2.	"I Wanted It Too"	Ralph MacDonald; William Salter	2:51
3.	"I Can See the Sun in Late December"	Stevie Wonder	12:48
4.	"Some Gospel According to Matthew"	Stuart Scharf	2:37
5.	"Feel Like Makin' Love"	McDaniels	2:55
6.	"Mister Magic"	MacDonald; Salter	3:55
7.	"Early Ev'ry Midnite"	MacDonald; Pendarvis	5:54
8.	"Old Heartbreak Top Ten"	McDaniels	4:22
9.	"She's Not Blind"	Scharf	5:24
Total length:			46:34

== Personnel ==
Performers and musicians

- Roberta Flack – lead and backing vocals, keyboards, arrangements (3, 5)
- Bob James – keyboards
- Leon Pendarvis – keyboards, arrangements (1, 5, 7, 8)
- Richard Tee – keyboards
- Harry Whitaker – keyboards, arrangements (3)
- Keith Loving – acoustic guitar, electric guitar
- Hugh McCracken – acoustic guitar, electric guitar
- David Spinozza – acoustic guitar, electric guitar
- Richie Resnicoff – acoustic guitar, electric guitar
- Stuart Scharf – fretted instruments, arrangements (4, 9)
- Anthony Jackson – electric bass
- Gary King – electric bass
- Alphonse Mouzon – drums
- Idris Muhammad – drums
- Ronnie Zito – drums
- David Carey – percussion, vibraphone
- Ralph MacDonald – congas, percussion, arrangements (2, 6)
- Phil Kraus – percussion, timpani
- Arthur Jenkins – kalimba, arrangements (2)
- James Vass – flute
- Joe Farrell – oboe
- Karen Sargent – oboe
- Jo Armstead – backing vocals
- Patti Austin – backing vocals
- Betty Buckley – backing vocals
- Bob Dorough – backing vocals
- William Eaton – backing vocals, arrangements (2)
- Janice Gadson – backing vocals
- Lani Groves – backing vocals
- Rhetta Hughes – backing vocals
- Lesley Miller – backing vocals
- William Salter – backing vocals, arrangements (2, 6)
- Maeretha Stewart – backing vocals
- Deniece Williams – backing vocals

Technical

- Roberta Flack – producer, album design
- Leon Pendarvis – associate producer
- Gene McDaniels – co-producer
- Antisia Music, Inc. – co-producers
- Scharf / Dorough, Ltd. – co-producers
- Frederick Wilkerson – vocal production
- Louise Fleming – production assistant
- Jim McCurdy – engineer, remixing
- Stephen Y. Scheaffer – engineer
- John Struthers – assistant engineer
- Harry Yamick – engineer
- Lou Stovall – album design, cover artwork

== Charts ==
Weekly chart performance for Feel Like Makin' Love
Chart (1975)	Peak position
US Billboard 200	24
US Top Jazz Albums (Billboard)	11
US Top R&B/Hip-Hop Albums (Billboard)	5
