= These Are Special Times (TV program) =

- Starring: Celine Dion; Rosie O'Donnell; Andrea Bocelli
- Country of origin: United States
- No. of episodes: 1

Production
- Running time: 44 mins (w/o commercial breaks)

Original release
- Network: CBS
- Release: November 25, 1998

These Are Special Times is an American television special by Canadian singer Celine Dion that was broadcast by CBS on 25 November 1998. It promoted her first English holiday album of the same name, These Are Special Times. The program was filmed in front of a live studio audience, with Dion (backed by her touring band and a full orchestra) performing holiday songs from the album, as well as several of her hits. She was joined by guests comedic actress and singer Rosie O'Donnell and Italian tenor Andrea Bocelli. The special also included footage of Dion in her hometown of Charlemagne, Quebec.

The broadcast received positive reviews and drew an audience of more than 16 million viewers. It also earned two Emmy Award nominations. In 2007, it was released on DVD as part of the Collector's Edition re-release of the These Are Special Times album.

== Set list ==
1. "The Power of Love"
2. "Do You Hear What I Hear?" (with Rosie O'Donnell)
3. "O Holy Night"
4. "Because You Loved Me"
5. "Let's Talk About Love"
6. "The First Time Ever I Saw Your Face"
7. "My Heart Will Go On"
8. "The Prayer" (with Andrea Bocelli)
9. "Ave Maria" (performed by Andrea Bocelli)
10. "Feliz Navidad"
11. "These Are the Special Times"
