= Roberta (album) =

Studio album by Roberta Flack
- Released: October 3, 1994
- Studios: Duplex Studios, The Hit Factory, Soundtrack Studios, Clinton Recording Studios, Atlantic Studios, Right Track Recording, Room With A View, Back Pocket Studios and Sound On Sound (New York City, New York); LGK Studios (Leonia, New Jersey)
- Genres: R&B; soul
- Length: 72:20
- Label: Atlantic
- Producers: Roberta Flack; Jerry Barnes and Katreese Barnes (co-producers on tracks 1–6, 10, 11 & 13); Shane Keister and Barry Miles (co-producers on tracks 7–9, 14 & 15); Bernard Wright and Richard Keller (co-producers on tracks 8 & 9)

Roberta Flack chronology
Softly with These Songs: The Best of Roberta Flack (1993)	Roberta (1994)	The Christmas Album (1997)

Singles from Roberta
- 1. "It Might Be You / Let's Stay Together" Released: December 5, 1994

Roberta is Roberta Flack's fourteenth album, released in 1994. It consists of cover versions of jazz and soul standards. It was also her final album for Atlantic Records after twenty five years with the label since her debut. As an album Roberta was bestowed with a Grammy nomination in the category of Best Traditional Pop Vocal Performance.

== Critical reception ==
Professional ratings
Review scores
Source	Rating
AllMusic	3/5 stars
Christgau's Consumer Guide	(2-star Honorable Mention)
Entertainment Weekly	A−

Dimitri Ehrlich of Entertainment Weekly remarked "On this inspired swing through soul, blues, / and jazz classics-such as Al Green's Let's Stay Together, B. B. King's The Thrill Is Gone, and Billy Eckstine's 1945 hit, Cottage For Sale-Flack sounds as supple, dramatic, and warm as ever. Sure, there are few bows to contemporary R&B; in terms of form or content, but that's okay: After all, a singer of her standing is above kowtowing to trends." Robert Christgau also gave Roberta a two out of three stars rating. Christgau described the album as "the great black pop of middle-class dreams".

== Track listing ==
1. "Let's Stay Together" (Al Green, Al Jackson Jr., Willie Mitchell) - 4:55
2. "Sweet Georgia Brown" (Ben Bernie, Kenneth Casey, Maceo Pinkard; Additional Lyrics: Jerry Barnes, Katreese Barnes, Roberta Flack) - 5:14
3. "The Thrill Is Gone" (Rick Darnell, Roy Hawkins) - 5:14
4. "It Might Be You" (Alan and Marilyn Bergman, Dave Grusin) - 10:03
5. "In a Sentimental Mood" (Duke Ellington, Irving Mills, Manny Kurtz) - 3:08
6. "Looking for Another Pure Love" (Stevie Wonder) - 4:50
7. "I Don't Care Who Knows (Baby I'm Yours)" (Buddy Johnson, Ella Johnson) - 4:05
8. "Prelude to a Kiss [Intro]" - 0:43
9. "Prelude to a Kiss" (Ellington, Mills, Benny Golson, Irving Gordon) (Rap Intro by Gabrielle Goodman) - 4:27
10. "Angel Eyes" (Earl K. Brent, Matt Dennis) - 6:35
11. "Tenderly" (Walter Gross, Jack Lawrence) - 3:48
12. "A Cottage for Sale" (Larry Conley, Willard Robison) - 4:37
13. "Isn't It Romantic?" (Richard Rodgers, Lorenz Hart) - 3:42
14. "My Romance" (Rodgers, Hart) - 5:39
15. "You'll Never Know ('Til You Let Go)" (Jerry Barnes, Katreese Barnes, Roberta Flack, Barry Miles) - 5:20

== Personnel ==
Musicians

- Roberta Flack – vocals, backing vocals
- Katreese Barnes – acoustic piano (1, 12), backing vocals (1–6, 15), keyboards (2–6), saxophone (2, 3, 6, 13), synthesizers (4, 12)
- Bernard Wright – acoustic piano (1, 3), synth pad (1), clavinet (3), synth solo (3), additional keyboards (4), keyboards (5, 7, 9), backing vocals (5), synth bass (9), Moog bass (12)
- Kenny Barron – acoustic piano (4, 10, 11, 13)
- Richard Keller – keyboard programming (4), additional keyboards (9), synthesizer programming (9), drum programming (9)
- Barry Miles – keyboards (7, 15), acoustic piano (14)
- Hiram Bullock – guitars (1)
- Phil Hamilton – guitars (2, 3, 6, 7), electric guitar solo (4)
- Paul Pesco – acoustic guitar (4), electric guitar (4)
- Paul Pimsler – guitars (12)
- Jerry Barnes – bass (1–6), backing vocals (1–6, 15), guitars (2, 5), drum programming (2, 4–6), additional synthesizers (4), electric bass (7)
- Ray Drummond – bass (4, 10, 11, 13)
- Anthony Jackson – electric bass (14, 15)
- Ivan Hampden Jr. – drums (1)
- Steve Jordan – drums (2)
- William "JuJu" House – drums (3), drum fills (5), congas (6)
- Ben Riley – drums (4, 10, 11, 13)
- Buddy Williams – hi-hat cymbal (5), drums (7, 12)
- Shane Keister – drum programming (9), Moog bass (12), synthesizer programming (15)
- Allan Schwartzberg – drums (15)
- Steve Kroon – percussion (1, 5, 6)
- Steve Thornton – percussion (1, 3, 10–13), timbales (5)
- Gary Fritz – percussion (2)
- Bashiri Johnson – percussion (4, 15)
- Roger Byam – tenor saxophone (12), saxophones (13)
- Jamal Haynes – trombone (13)
- Aaron Flagg – trumpet (2, 6, 13)
- Randy Brecker – flugelhorn (15)
- The Duke Ellington Orchestra – musical intro (9)
- Andre Smith – backing vocals (4)
- Tony Terry – backing vocals (4)
- Gwen Guthrie – backing vocals (15)
- Curtis King – backing vocals (15)

Music arrangements

- Jerry Barnes – arrangements (1–4, 6, 12), vocal arrangements (15), vocal supervision (15)
- Katreese Barnes – arrangements (1, 2, 4–6, 12)
- Roberta Flack – arrangements (1, 2, 6, 7, 12)
- Ruy Folguera – synthesizer arrangements (1)
- Barry Miles – arrangements (7, 14, 15)
- Bernard Wright – arrangements (7)
- Kenny Barron – arrangements (10, 11, 13)

=== Production ===
- Ahmet Ertegun – executive producer
- Roberta Flack – producer
- Katreese Barnes – co-producer (1–3, 5, 6, 10, 11, 13), producer (4)
- Jerry Barnes – co-producer (1–3, 5, 6, 10, 11, 13), producer (4)
- Shane Keister – co-producer (7–9, 14, 15)
- Barry Miles – co-producer (7–9, 14, 15)
- Richard Keller – co-producer (8, 9)
- Bernard Wright – co-producer (8, 9)
- Joan Martin – production coordinator
- Darren Crawforth – art direction, design
- STAIN – art direction, design
- Kim Taylor Reece – photography
- David Nathan – liner notes
- Magic Lady – management

Technical credits

- Greg Calbi – mastering at Masterdisk (New York City, New York)
- Dana Mars – engineer (1–3, 5–7, 12, 13)
- Stanley Wallace – engineer (1–5, 7, 10–15)
- Goh Hotoda – mixing (1, 12)
- Jerry Barnes – mixing (2, 3, 5), engineer (5, 7)
- Butch Jones – mixing (2)
- Russell Elevado – mixing (3)
- Ray Bardani – mixing (4)
- John Jaszcz – mixing (6)
- Frank Filipetti – mixing (7, 10, 13–15)
- Richard Keller – mixing (8, 9)
- John Angelini – assistant engineer
- Grant Dickins – assistant engineer
- Jonathan Mooney – assistant engineer
- Al Theurer – assistant engineer
- Randy Brown – technical assistant
- Ben Newberry – technical assistant
