= Making Love (song) =

Single by Roberta Flack

from the album I'm the One
- B-side: "Jesse"
- Released: February 16, 1982 (Charted March 6)
- Genre: Smooth soul
- Length: 3:43
- Label: Atlantic
- Songwriters: Burt Bacharach; Bruce Roberts; Carole Bayer Sager
- Producers: Burt Bacharach; Carole Bayer Sager

Roberta Flack singles chronology
"Lovin' You (Is Such an Easy Thang to Do)" (1981)	"Making Love" (1982)	"I'm the One" (1982)

"Making Love" is a 1982 song written by Burt Bacharach, Bruce Roberts, and Carole Bayer Sager to serve as the theme song for the film of the same name. As recorded by Roberta Flack, with Bacharach and Bayer Sager producing, it played under the closing credits. It was a Top 20 hit single for Flack (who arranged the track) and was included on the singer's 1982 album release I'm the One.

== Background ==
Carole Bayer Sager was a frequent lyricist for either Burt Bacharach - whom she married in April 1982 - or Bruce Roberts but all three songwriters only collaborated on occasion: "Making Love" is the second and most successful of three charting collaborations for the Bacharach/ Roberts/ Bayer Sager songwriting team, subsequent to "Stronger Than Before" - #30 as recorded by Carole Bayer Sager in 1981 - and preceding the 1986 El DeBarge hit "Love Always" (#43).

In the late 1960s Burt Bacharach had regularly visited the Capitol Hill club Mr Henry's to hear a pre-stardom Roberta Flack sing, but "Making Love" marked the first time Flack had recorded a Bacharach composition: Flack's 1983 duet album with Peabo Bryson: Born to Love, would feature two Bacharach/ Bayer Sager songwriting/ producing collaborations: "Blame It On Me" and "Maybe". Flack would recall having had no preview of the song "Making Love" prior to recording it: (Roberta Flack quote:)"I just went into the studio, sight-read it, and I love the way it came out."

The song's lyrics "There's more to love...than making love" were prominently displayed on the poster and also newspaper/magazine promo ads for the parent film Making Love, described as the first mainstream gay-themed Hollywood production: commenting on singing the theme for a potentially controversial film Flack would state she "[could never be] afraid of singing a song about love...Love is universal, like music," adding: "I was so glad when that song charted." In fact the heavily hyped film proved to be a box office disappointment, largely leaving Flack's single to fare on its own merit: with no overt same-sex references in its lyrics Flack would allow that some fans of the song "did not know that the song was about love between two men" adding: "I would talk about it in my shows...about how love is love [whether] between a man and a woman, between two men, between two women." Apparently Flack was unaware that the lyrics are about the love between the male and female protagonists of the film, celebrating, after their breakup due to the man's coming to terms with his homosexuality, their ability to still love each other (But now neither one of us is breaking/ There's more to love, I know/ Than making love).

== Impact ==
=== Overview ===
"Making Love" would return Flack - as a soloist - to the Top 20 of the Billboard Hot 100 for the first time since 1974: she had in 1978 reached #2 with the Donny Hathaway duet "The Closer I Get to You" and that same year reached #24 with the movie theme song "If Ever I See You Again" (not sung by Flack in its parent film). Another of Flack's more moderate single successes of the 1970s: her version of the Janis Ian composition "Jesse" which had reached #30 in 1973, served as the B-side of the "Making Love" single. Eventually ranked at #46 on the Billboard Hot 100 tally for the year 1982, "Making Love" was also a hit on Billboard magazine's Adult Contemporary chart (#7) and also on the magazine's R&B chart (#29).

Flack's followup single: "I'm the One", stalled at #42 on the Hot 100, leaving "Making Love" her sixth and final Top 40 hit although she would subsequently reach the Top 20 with two duets: "Tonight, I Celebrate My Love" with Peabo Bryson (#16/ 1983) and "Set the Night to Music" with Maxi Priest (#6/ 1991) which, with her three Donny Hathaway duet hits from the 1970s, would make Flack's overall Top 40 tally eleven hits.

"Making Love" was not one of Flack's major international successes, charting low in both Australia (#63) and Canada (#43) (the track did reach #22 on the Adult Contemporary chart in Canada).

=== Chart history ===
==== Weekly charts ====
Chart (1982)	Peak position
Australia Kent Music Report	63
Canada RPM Top Singles	43
Canada RPM Adult Contemporary	22
US Billboard Hot 100	13
US Billboard Adult Contemporary	7
US Billboard R&B	29
US Cash Box Top 100	14

==== Year-end charts ====
Chart (1982)	Rank
US Billboard Hot 100	46
US Billboard Adult Contemporary	20
US Cash Box	87

=== Critical reception ===
Roberta Flack's recording of "Making Love" drew polarized critical opinion. The Washington Post music critic Geoffrey Himes considered that track's parent album: I'm the One, evinced "the mistaken notion that the slower and dreamier the song, the more profound it is", citing "Making Love" itself as the "worst example": "Flack whispers the maudlin lyrics [of "Making Love"] 'meaningfully' and the syrupy melody drags interminably." However, Chuck Graham of the Tucson Citizen characterized the I'm the One album as "sweetly tempered [with] moods...done in pastels [i.e. subtly]", deeming the track "Making Love" "an expression of adult confidence that overcomes the hurt of infidelity [whose] lyric is several steps above the usual level of pop songs." "Snicks" of the Logo TV site NewNowNext.com ranked Flack's "Making Love" at #12 on his 50 Movie Songs Of The 80s ranking, citing it as a "gorgeous ballad [that is] one of Roberta’s finest moments."

== Other versions ==
The song has been covered by:

- The Chi-Lites on their 1983 album Bottom's Up: the track served as B-side for the R&B chart single "Bad Motor Scooter" (#28).
- Anita Meyer on her 1989 album Close to You - the most beautiful songs of Burt Bacharach.
- Jaya on her 2011 covers album of mostly smooth soul hits All Souled Out.
