= Let It Be Roberta =

Studio album by Roberta Flack
- Released: February 7, 2012
- Genre: R&B, soul
- Length: 49:27
- Label: Sony Music
- Producer: Sherrod Barnes; Barry Miles; Roberta Flack; Ricky Jordan; Jerry Barnes

Roberta Flack chronology
The Christmas Album (1997)	Let It Be Roberta (2012)

Let It Be Roberta (subtitled Roberta Flack Sings the Beatles) is the fifteenth and final studio album by American singer Roberta Flack, released in 2012 by Sony Music. The album peaked at No. 30 on both the Billboard Top R&B/Hip-Hop Albums and Top Independent Albums charts. The album was the last Flack released before her death in 2025.

== Critical reception ==
Professional ratings
Review scores
Source	Rating
AllMusic	4/5 stars
Popmatters	(6/10)

Steve Leggett of AllMusic praised the album saying, "The Beatles' song catalog is one of the best-known and revered bodies of work in the whole of modern music, and the depth, variety, and timelessness of the songs this once-in-a-lifetime band produced make that catalog both a marvel and a treasure. Everyone knows these songs, and everyone knows them in the original Beatles versions. Those versions are there, shining in stone, and even when they show up in remixes like in the recent LOVE mashup, the original recordings echo unshakably in the mind. Roberta Flack knows this. On Let It Be Roberta: Roberta Flack Sings the Beatles, she tackles 12 of the group's songs -- 11 written by John Lennon and Paul McCartney and one written by George Harrison -- and she knows full well that she's dealing with the ghosts of the original versions. She knows, and she addresses it by reconfiguring the 12 songs she's chosen to sing into fascinating new shapes and arrangements, not exactly escaping the original versions, but giving them a fresh new direction by jazzy shifts in the melodies, and pinning them to inventive and very contemporary rhythms and recording techniques."

Matt Bauer of Exclaim!, in a favourable review, said "Perhaps taking inspiration from Bettye Lavette's successful 2010 release of British Invasion classics, Interpretations: The British Rock Songbook, Let It Be Roberta sees Flack tackle 12 Beatles classics. The Lennon/McCartney catalogue is so embedded in our collective consciousness that you can't shake the echoes of the original songs and the fact that Flack is well aware of this makes this set interesting."

== Track listing ==
All tracks are written by John Lennon and Paul McCartney, except where noted.

No.	Title	Length
1.	"In My Life"	4:09
2.	"Hey Jude"	3:11
3.	"We Can Work It Out"	4:02
4.	"Let It Be"	4:15
5.	"Oh! Darling"	4:39
6.	"I Should Have Known Better"	3:15
7.	"The Long and Winding Road"	4:09
8.	"Come Together"	4:39
9.	"Isn't It a Pity" (George Harrison)	3:41
10.	"If I Fell"	3:24
11.	"And I Love Him"	3:51
12.	"Here, There and Everywhere"	6:16

== Credits ==
- Backing vocals – Katreese Barnes, Jerry Barnes, Roberta Flack, Sherrod Barnes, Tameka Simone, Vivian Sessoms
- Bass – David Williams, Jerry Barnes, Nichlas Branker, Sherrod Barnes
- Drums – Bernard Sweetney, Buddy Williams, Charlie Drayton, Chris Parks, Kuhari Parker, Ricardo Jordan
- Engineer, Mixed By – Roy Hendrickson
- Guitar – Dean Brown, Jerry Barnes, Nathan Page, Sherrod Barnes
- Keyboards – Barry Miles, Bernard Wright, Morris Pleasure, Roberta Flack, Selan Lerner, Shedrick Mitchell, Sherrod Barnes
- Producer and arranged by Barry Miles (tracks: 5, 10, 11), Jerry Barnes (tracks: 2), Ricky Jordan (tracks: 8), Roberta Flack (tracks: 8, 12), Sherrod Barnes (tracks: 1 to 7, 9 to 11)
