= Roberta Flack Featuring Donny Hathaway =

Studio album by Roberta Flack
- Released: March 1980
- Recorded: 1979
- Studio: Atlantic, New York City; RCA, New York City; Hit Factory, New York City; Power Station, New York City; Le Studio, Quebec, Canada; Crystal Sound, Hollywood
- Genre: R&B, soul, Post-Disco
- Label: Atlantic
- Producer: Roberta Flack, Eric Mercury, Arif Mardin, Joe Ferla

Roberta Flack chronology
Roberta Flack (1978)	Roberta Flack Featuring Donny Hathaway (1980)	Live & More (1980)

Singles from Roberta Flack Featuring Donny Hathaway
- 1. "You Are My Heaven / I'll Love You Forever and Ever" Released: November 15, 1979; 2. "Back Together Again / God Don't Like Ugly" Released: February 17, 1980; 3. "Don't Make Me Wait Too Long / Only Heaven Can Wait (For Love)" Released: July 13, 1980

Professional ratings
Review scores
Source	Rating
AllMusic	3/5 stars
The Rolling Stone Album Guide	3/5 stars

Roberta Flack Featuring Donny Hathaway is the ninth studio album by American singer Roberta Flack. Released via Atlantic in March 1980, the album features posthumous vocals by close friend and collaborator Donny Hathaway, who had died in 1979. At the 23rd Grammy Awards in 1981, the album was nominated for a Grammy Award for Best Female R&B Vocal Performance. The award, however, went to Stephanie Mills for "Never Knew Love Like This Before."

== Overview ==
Intended as her second duets album with Donny Hathaway (following 1972's Roberta Flack & Donny Hathaway), Flack's ninth studio album project became a Flack solo album with Hathaway as guest due to Hathaway's death after recording only two songs with her. On 13 January 1979 Hathaway and Flack had recorded the duets "Back Together Again" and "You Are My Heaven" - the latter the last song Hathaway would ever record: after having dinner with Flack at her residence in the Dakota, Hathaway had then returned to his suite on the fifteenth floor of Essex House, later fatally falling from the window of his suite.

Despite becoming the first Roberta Flack album since Quiet Fire (1971) to not yield a Top 40 hit, ...Featuring Donny Hathaway provided Flack with a substantial commercial comeback following the underperformance of her precedent 1978 self-titled album, with ...Featuring Donny Hathaway becoming a certified Gold album. Also both the duets on ...Featuring Donny Hathaway reached the R&B chart Top Ten peaking at #8, with "Back Together Again" reaching #3 in the UK: "Back Together Again" had been written by James Mtume and Reggie Lucas, members of Flack's back-up band who had previously written the 1978 Flack/ Hathaway hit "The Closer I Get to You", while "You Are My Heaven" was a Stevie Wonder co-write (with album producer Eric Mercury). Wonder also contributed the song "Don't Make Me Wait Too Long", providing the track's whispered rap: issued as a third single "Don't Make Me Wait..." was not a major mainstream hit, but issued on a 12" single with "Back Together Again" afforded Flack her first disco chart hit single with a #6 peak.

Flack has mentioned the track "Disguises" as being among her favorite lower-profile songs in her repertoire. ...Featuring Donny Hathaway was also the third consecutive Roberta Flack album on which she sang a composition by Michael Masser, who in 1983 would write (with Gerry Goffin) and produce "Tonight, I Celebrate My Love" the million-selling Peabo Bryson duet which would be Flack's most successful post-1970s release.

In 2023, "Don't Make Me Wait Too Long", was reworked into a more electronic cover version, with Stevie Wonder being credited as an artist on this rendition, with vocals from Kimberly Brewer, and Joe.

== Track listing ==
=== Side one ===
1. "Only Heaven Can Wait (For Love)" (Flack, Eric Mercury) – 4:03
2. "God Don't Like Ugly" (Gwen Guthrie) – 4:34
3. "You Are My Heaven" (Eric Mercury, Stevie Wonder) – 4:10
4. "Disguises" (Stuart Scharf) – 2:24

=== Side two ===
1. "Don't Make Me Wait Too Long" (Stevie Wonder) – 7:45
2. "Back Together Again" (Reggie Lucas, James Mtume) – 9:45
3. "Stay with Me" (Gerry Goffin, Michael Masser) – 3:47

== Personnel ==
- Roberta Flack – lead and backing vocals, keyboards, synthesizers, arrangements (1, 2, 4)
- Donny Hathaway – lead vocals (3, 6)
- Ray Chew – keyboards, additional horns and strings (6)
- Hubert Eaves III – synthesizers
- Ronnie Foster – synthesizers
- Paul Griffin – keyboards
- Raymond Jones – keyboards
- Ed Walsh – synthesizers
- Harry Whitaker – keyboards
- Stevie Wonder – keyboards (6), drums (6), backing vocals (6)
- Hiram Bullock – guitar
- Reggie Lucas – guitar
- Jeff Mironov – guitar
- John Tropea – guitar
- Eluriel "Tinker" Barfield – bass
- Basil Fearrington – bass
- Anthony Jackson – bass
- Nathan Watts – bass (6)
- Howard King – drums (1–5, 7)
- Errol "Crusher" Bennett – percussion
- Armando Noriega – string arrangements (1, 7)
- Arif Mardin – basic track arrangements (3, 7)
- Paul Riser – string arrangements (5)
- James Mtume – arrangements (6)
- Eric Mercury – backing vocals (1)
- Jocelyn Brown – backing vocals (2, 6)
- Gwen Guthrie – backing vocals (2, 6), BGV arrangements (2, 6)
- Yvonne Lewis – backing vocals (2, 6)
- Merle Miller – backing vocals (2, 6)
- Luther Vandross – backing vocals (2, 6), BGV arrangements (2, 6)
- Brenda White-King – backing vocals (2, 6)
- Revelation – backing vocals (2, 6)
- Eleanore Mills – backing vocals (3)

=== Production ===
- Roberta Flack – producer (1, 2, 4–7), basic track producer (3), vocal producer (3)
- Eric Mercury – producer (1, 2, 4–7)
- Joe Ferla – co-producer (1, 4)
- Arif Mardin – basic track producer (3), vocal producer (3)
- Howie Lindeman – engineer
- Joe Lopes – assistant engineer
- Pat Martin – assistant engineer
- Paul Northfield – assistant engineer
- Gary Olazabal – assistant engineer
- Bobby Warner – assistant engineer
- Jack Adelman – mastering
- Hélène Guertary – cover illustration
