= I'm the One (Roberta Flack album) =

Studio album by Roberta Flack
- Released: May 1, 1982
- Studio: A & R Recording and Rosebud Recording Studio (New York City, New York); Westlake Studios (Los Angeles, California)
- Genre: R&B, soul
- Label: Atlantic
- Producer: William Eaton; Roberta Flack; Ralph MacDonald; William Salter except "Making Love": Burt Bacharach and Carole Bayer Sager

Roberta Flack chronology
Bustin' Loose (1981)	I'm the One (1982)	Born to Love (1983)

Singles from I'm the One
- 1. "Making Love / Jesse" Released: February 8, 1982; 2. "I'm the One / 'Til the Morning Comes" Released: May 4, 1982; 3. "In the Name of Love / Happiness" Released: October 4, 1982

Professional ratings
Review scores
Source	Rating
AllMusic	3/5 stars

I'm the One is an album by Roberta Flack released in May 1982 which reached #59 on the album chart in Billboard whose R&B album chart afforded the album a #16 peak.

The Burt Bacharach/Carole Bayer Sager-produced "Making Love", which appeared in the film of the same name and in the spring of 1982 had afforded Flack her final solo Top 40 hit (#13 on the Billboard Hot 100), was included on the I'm the One album along with eight new tracks co-produced by William Eaton, Ralph MacDonald, William Salter and Flack herself.

The track "I'm the One," given parallel single release with the album, peaked at #42 on the Hot 100 where it marked Flack's final solo appearance, although she'd return to the Hot 100 in 1983 with the duets "Tonight, I Celebrate My Love" (#16) and "You're Looking Like Love to Me" (#58) (both with Peabo Bryson) and again in 1991 with "Set the Night to Music" (with Maxi Priest/ #6).

A third single from the I'm the One album: "In the Name of Love", reached #24 on the Billboard Adult Contemporary chart.

== Track listing ==
1. "I'm the One" (William Eaton, Ralph MacDonald, William Salter) - 4:05
  Single 2 A-side
2. "'Till the Morning Comes" (Casey Daniels, Ralph MacDonald, William Salter) - 3:54
  Single 2 B-side
3. "Love and Let Love" (William Eaton, Ralph MacDonald, William Salter) - 4:34
4. "Never Loved Before" (Bobby Caldwell, Henry Grumpo Marx) - 3:58
5. "In the Name of Love" (Ralph MacDonald, William Salter, Bill Withers) - 4:00
  Single 3 A-side
6. "Ordinary Man" (Peabo Bryson) - 4:26
7. "Making Love" (Burt Bacharach, Bruce Roberts, Carole Bayer Sager) - 3:43
  Single 1 A-side
8. "Happiness" (Harriet Schock, William D. Smith) - 3:22
  Single 3 B-side
9. "My Love for You" (Brenda Russell, William D. Smith) - 3:22

== Personnel ==
- Roberta Flack – vocals
- Richard Tee – Fender Rhodes (1–6, 7–9), acoustic piano (7)
- Paul Griffin – Oberheim OB-X (1–6, 8, 9)
- Burt Bacharach – synthesizers (7)
- Craig Hundley – synthesizers (7)
- Eric Gale – guitars (1–6, 8, 9)
- Lee Ritenour – guitars (7)
- Marcus Miller – bass guitar (1–6, 8, 9)
- Neil Stubenhaus – bass guitar (7)
- Steve Gadd – drums (1–3, 5, 6, 8, 9)
- Buddy Williams – drums (4)
- Jim Keltner – drums (7)
- Ralph MacDonald – percussion (1–6, 8, 9)
- Paulinho da Costa – percussion (7)
- Grover Washington Jr. – soprano sax solo (5, 9)
- Vivian Cherry – backing vocals
- Kasey Cisyk – backing vocals
- William Eaton – backing vocals, all arrangements
- Frank Floyd – backing vocals
- Diva Gray – backing vocals
- Zachary Sanders – backing vocals

=== Production ===
- William Eaton – producer (1–6, 8, 9)
- Roberta Flack – producer (1–6, 8, 9)
- Ralph MacDonald – producer (1–6, 8, 9)
- William Salter – producer (1–6, 8, 9)
- Burt Bacharach – producer (7)
- Carole Bayer Sager – producer (7)
- Richard Alderson – engineer (1–6, 8, 9)
- Carla Bandini – engineer (1–6, 8, 9)
- Mike Bradley – engineer (1–6, 8, 9)
- Ollie Cotton – engineer (1–6, 8, 9)
- Ed Rak – engineer (1–6, 8, 9)
- Elliot Scheiner – engineer (1–6, 8, 9), remixing
- Bruce Swedien – engineer (7)
- Kendall Brown – assistant engineer (1–6, 8, 9)
- Eddie Heath – assistant engineer (1–6, 8, 9)
- Anthony McDonald – assistant engineer (1–6, 8, 9)
- Lamont Moreno – assistant engineer (1–6, 8, 9)
- Renee Bell – production coordinator
- Janaire Boger – production coordinator
- Jacklyn Brown – production coordinator
- Kirk D. Fancher – production coordinator
- Bob Defrin – art direction, design
- Kinko Y. Craft – illustration

== Charts ==
=== Weekly charts ===
Chart (1982)	Peak position
US Billboard 200	59
US Top R&B/Hip-Hop Albums (Billboard)	16

=== Year-end charts ===
Chart (1982)	Position
US Top R&B/Hip-Hop Albums (Billboard)	47
