= First Take (album) =

Studio album by Roberta Flack
- Released: June 20, 1969
- Recorded: February 24–26, 1969
- Studio: Atlantic Studios, New York City
- Genre: Folk jazz; vocal jazz; soul; R&B
- Length: 46:08
- Label: Atlantic
- Producer: Joel Dorn

Roberta Flack chronology
First Take (1969)	Chapter Two (1970)

Singles from First Take
- 1. "Compared to What" / "Hey, That's No Way to Say Goodbye" Released: August 14, 1969; 2. "The First Time Ever I Saw Your Face" / "Trade Winds" Released: January 24, 1972

First Take is the debut album by the American singer Roberta Flack. It was released on June 20, 1969, by Atlantic Records. In the 2020 edition of Rolling Stone's 500 Greatest Albums of All Time list, the album was ranked 451st.

== Promotion ==
After a track from First Take, "The First Time Ever I Saw Your Face", was included by Clint Eastwood in his 1971 film Play Misty for Me, and the song became a number 1 hit in the United States, the album itself reached number 1 on the Billboard albums chart and Billboard R&B album chart. Furthermore, the single topped the chart for the Billboard Year-End Hot 100 singles of 1972, possibly the only sleeper hit to accomplish this.

== Critical reception ==
Professional ratings
Review scores
Source	Rating
AllMusic	5/5 stars
Pitchfork	9.5/10

First Take was released to universal acclaim. In the 2020 edition of Rolling Stone's 500 Greatest Albums of All Time list, the album was ranked number 451. AllMusic editor John Bush rated the album five out of five stars. He felt that First Take "introduced a singer who'd assimilated the powerful interpretative talents of Nina Simone and Sarah Vaughan, the earthy power of Aretha Franklin, and the crystal purity and emotional resonance of folksingers like Judy Collins. Indeed, the album often sounded more like vocal jazz or folk than soul [...] No soul artist had ever recorded an album like this, making First Take one of the most fascinating soul debuts of the era."

Julius Lester, writing for Rolling Stone, found that First Take was "one of those rare albums that has the power to enlighten the emotional content of one's life. You feel the world differently after listening to it." Pitchfork's Elizabeth Nelson wrote: "Recorded over a period of just 10 hours, the future star’s breakthrough 1969 debut captured her idiosyncratic mix of soul, jazz, and folk and her singular vision as a bandleader [...] Recorded in the violent blinding flash of a moment when absolutely nothing seemed certain. "And it would last 'til the end of time," she sang. So it has."

== Reissue ==
In 2019, Flack's website announced that First Take would be remastered and re-released as a limited deluxe edition of only 3,000 copies commemorating the album's 50th anniversary. The set includes one vinyl LP and two compact discs: one CD is the remastered album and the other contains "rare and unreleased recordings". The set was released on July 24, 2020.

== Track listing ==
First Take track listing
No.	Title	Writer(s)	Length
1.	"Compared to What"	Gene McDaniels	5:16
2.	"Angelitos Negros"	Andrés Eloy Blanco; Manuel Álvarez Maciste	6:56
3.	"Our Ages or Our Hearts"	Robert Ayers; Donny Hathaway	6:09
4.	"I Told Jesus"	Traditional	6:09
5.	"Hey, That's No Way to Say Goodbye"	Leonard Cohen	4:08
6.	"The First Time Ever I Saw Your Face"	Ewan MacColl	5:22
7.	"Tryin' Times"	Donny Hathaway; Leroy Hutson	5:08
8.	"Ballad of the Sad Young Men"	Fran Landesman; Tommy Wolf	7:00

2020 anniversary edition – bonus tracks
No.	Title	Writer(s)	Length
9.	"Compared to What" (single edit)	McDaniels	4:37
10.	"The First Time Ever I Saw Your Face" (single edit)	MacColl	4:20
11.	"Trade Winds"	Ralph MacDonald; William Salter	5:37

2020 anniversary edition – bonus disc
No.	Title	Writer(s)	Length
1.	"All the Way" (live)	Sammy Cahn; Jimmy Van Heusen	8:39
2.	"This Could Be the Start of Something"	Steve Allen	1:23
3.	"Groove Me"	Unknown	4:19
4.	"Nobody Knows You When You're Down and Out"	Jimmy Cox	6:24
5.	"Hush-a-Bye"	Traditional	5:33
6.	"Afro Blue"	Mongo Santamaría; Oscar Brown	9:21
7.	"It's Way Past Suppertime"	Les McCann; Vicki Arnold	3:53
8.	"Frankie and Johnny"	Traditional	7:15
9.	"On the Street Where You Live"	Alan Jay Lerner; Frederick Lowe	2:45
10.	"The House Song"	Noel Paul Stookey; Robert Bannard	5:54
11.	"Ain't No Mountain High Enough"	Nickolas Ashford and Valerie Simpson	3:25
12.	"The Song Is Love"	Dave Dixon; Richard Kniss; Mary Travers; Noel Paul Stookey; Peter Yarrow	5:20
13.	"To Sir with Love"	Don Black; Mark London	8:27

== Personnel ==
Performers and musicians

- Roberta Flack – piano, vocals
- Bucky Pizzarelli – guitar
- Ron Carter – double bass
- Ray Lucas – drums, percussion
- Seldon Powell, Frank Wess – saxophone
- Charles McCracken, George Ricci – cello
- Benny Powell – trombone
- Jimmy Nottingham, Joe Newman – trumpet
- Emanuel Green, Gene Orloff – violin
- Alfred Brown, Selwart Clarke, Theodore Israel – viola
- William S. Fischer – horn and string arrangements, string conducting

Technical

- William Arlt – recording engineer
- Bob Liftin – remixing engineer
- Stanislaw Zagórski – design
- Ken Heinen – photography

== Charts ==
Weekly chart performance for First Take
Chart (1972)	Peak position
Norwegian Albums (VG-lista)	17
UK Albums (OCC)	47
US Billboard 200	1
US Top Jazz Albums (Billboard)	3
US Top R&B/Hip-Hop Albums (Billboard)	1
Chart (2025)	Peak position
UK Album Downloads (OCC)	55

== Certifications ==
Certifications for First Take
Region	Certification	Certified units/sales
Canada (Music Canada)	Gold	50,000^{^}
United States (RIAA)	Platinum	1,000,000^{^}
^{^} Shipments figures based on certification alone.

== See also ==
- Roberta Flack discography
- List of number-one albums of 1972 (U.S.)
- List of number-one R&B albums of 1972 (U.S.)
