= Chapter Two (Roberta Flack album) =

Studio album by Roberta Flack
- Released: August 12, 1970
- Recorded: December 8–9, 1969, March–April 1970
- Studio: Atlantic, New York City
- Length: 38:19
- Label: Atlantic
- Producer: Joel Dorn; King Curtis

Roberta Flack chronology
First Take (1969)	Chapter Two (1970)	Quiet Fire (1971)

Singles from Chapter Two
- 1. "Reverend Lee / Business Goes On As Usual" Released: August 9, 1970; 2. "Do What You Gotta Do / Let It Be Me" Released: January 18, 1971

Professional ratings
Review scores
Source	Rating
AllMusic	4/5 stars
The Rolling Stone Album Guide	3/5 stars

Chapter Two is the second studio album by American singer Roberta Flack. It was released in 1970 by Atlantic Records.

== Track listing ==
=== Side one ===
1. "Reverend Lee" (Gene McDaniels) – 4:31
2. "Do What You Gotta Do" (Jimmy Webb) – 4:09
3. "Just Like a Woman" (Bob Dylan) – 6:14
4. "Let It Be Me" (Gilbert Bécaud, Mann Curtis, Pierre Delanoë) – 5:00

=== Side two ===
1. "Gone Away" (Donny Hathaway, Leroy Hutson, Curtis Mayfield) – 5:16
2. "Until It's Time for You to Go" (Buffy Sainte-Marie) – 4:57
3. "The Impossible Dream" (Joe Darion, Mitch Leigh) – 4:42
4. "Business Goes on as Usual" (Fred Hellerman, Fran Minkoff) – 3:30

== Personnel ==
Performers and musicians

- Roberta Flack – vocals, piano
- Eumir Deodato – conductor, horn arrangements, string arrangements
- Joel Dorn – producer
- Eric Gale – guitar
- Donny Hathaway – piano, arranger, background vocals
- Marshall Hawkins, Terry Plumeri, Chuck Rainey – bass guitar
- King Curtis – background vocals, producer
- Ray Lucas, Bernard Sweetney – drums
- Gene McDaniels – background vocals
- Warren Smith – percussion
- Chauncey Welsch, Ernie Royal, Frank Wess, Garnett Brown, George Marge, John Frosk, John Glasel, Trevor Lawrence – horns
- Hubert Laws, Joe Gentle – alto & bass flute
- Corky Hale – harp
- John Swallow – euphonium
- Alfred Brown, Arnold Black, Emanuel Green, Gene Orloff, Harry Lookofsky, Joe Malin, Kermit Moore, Leo Kahn, Lewis Eley, Max Kahn, Max Pollikoff, Noel Dacosta, Peter Buonconsiglio, Peter Dimitriades, Raoul Poliakin, Sanford Allen, Selwart Clarke, Seymour Myroff, Tosha Samaroff – strings

Technical

- Lew Hahn – recording and remix engineer
- Ira Friedlander – album design
- Jack Robinson – cover photography

== Charts ==
=== Weekly charts ===
Weekly chart performance for Chapter Two
Chart (1970–1971)	Peak position
US Billboard 200	33
US Top R&B/Hip-Hop Albums (Billboard)	4

=== Year-end charts ===
Year-end chart performance for Chapter Two
Chart (1971)	Position
US Billboard 200	11
US Top R&B/Hip-Hop Albums (Billboard)	2

== Certifications ==
Certifications for Chapter Two
Region	Certification	Certified units/sales
United States (RIAA)	Gold	500,000^{^}
^{^} Shipments figures based on certification alone.
