= The Christmas Album (Roberta Flack album) =

Studio album by Roberta Flack
- Released: November 4, 1997
- Studios: Clinton Recording Studios and Alien Flyers (New York City, New York)
- Genres: Funk; Soul; Pop
- Length: 43:33 (1997 release); 39:46 (2003 release)
- Label: Capitol
- Producers: Roberta Flack; Jerry Barnes; Philip Hamilton; Robbie Buchanan

Roberta Flack chronology
| Roberta (1994) | The Christmas Album (1997) | Let It Be Roberta (2012) |

Alternative cover
- 2003 reissue

The Christmas Album is the thirteenth studio album by American singer Roberta Flack. It was released by Capitol Records on November 4, 1997, in the United States. Flack's first Christmas album, it features the song, "As Long as There's Christmas," a duet with Peabo Bryson from the direct-to-video Disney film, Beauty and the Beast: The Enchanted Christmas (1997). In 2003, the album was reissued by Punahele Productions under the title Holiday; this version omitted "As Long as There's Christmas".

== Critical reception ==
Professional ratings
Review scores
| Source | Rating |
|---|---|
| AllMusic | 3/5 stars |

AllMusic editor Jason Ankeny rated the album three ouf of five stars and wrote: "For it's [sic] smooth sound and Flack's fine vocals, it is recommended to her fans."

== Track listing ==
Tracks 1–4 & 6–9 produced by Roberta Flack, Jerry Barnes and Philip Hamilton. Track 5 produced by Robbie Buchanan.

The Christmas Album track listing
| No. | Title | Writer(s) | Length |
|---|---|---|---|
| 1. | "The Christmas Song (Chestnuts Roasting on an Open Fire)" | Robert Wells; Mel Tormé | 3:54 |
| 2. | "There's Still My Joy" | Beth Nielsen Chapman; Melissa Manchester; Matt Rollings | 3:30 |
| 3. | "We Three Kings of Orient Are" | John Henry Hopkins Jr. | 6:08 |
| 4. | "25th of Last December" | Gene McDaniels | 4:55 |
| 5. | "As Long as There's Christmas" (duet with Peabo Bryson) | Don Black; Rachel Portman | 3:45 |
| 6. | "Because This Child Was Born" | Shelton Becton | 4:25 |
| 7. | "When There's Love" | Becton | 6:25 |
| 8. | "The Little Drummer Boy" | Katherine Kennicott Davis | 5:57 |
| 9. | "O Come All Ye Faithful" | Traditional | 4:34 |
| Total length: | | | 43:33 |

== Personnel ==
- Roberta Flack – vocals, arrangements (1–4, 8, 9)
- Nat Adderley – keyboards, acoustic piano
- Katreese Barnes – keyboards, acoustic piano, backing vocals
- Robbie Buchanan – keyboards (5), bass (5), drum programming (5), arrangements (5)
- Shelton Becton – keyboards, acoustic piano, backing vocals, arrangements (6, 7)
- Sherrod Barnes – guitars
- Dean Brown – guitars
- Philip Hamilton – guitars, electric bass
- Jeff Johnson – guitars
- James Harrah – guitars (5)
- Jerry Barnes – electric bass, backing vocals
- Richard Patterson – electric bass
- William "Ju Ju" House – drums, percussion
- Don Alias – percussion
- Gail Deadrick – arrangements
- Bernard Wright – arrangements (9)
- Ada Dyer – backing vocals
- Stuart Getz – backing vocals
- Andre Smith – backing vocals
- Peabo Bryson – vocals (5)

Strings

- Stanley Hunte – contractor
- Sanford Allen – concertmaster
- Jesse Levy, Caryl Paisner and Bruce Wang – cello
- Olivia Koppel, Lois Martin, Maxine Roach and Yuri Vodovoz – viola
- Sandra Billingslea, Larissa Blitz, Robert Chausow, Max Ellen, Charles Libove and Belinda Whitney-Barratt – violin

Choir

- Jerry Barnes, Katreese Barnes, Colleen Maria Johnson Becton, Shelton Becton, Vivian Cherry, Angela Clemmons-Patrick, Dennis Collins, Ada Dyer, Diva Gray, Sharon Jerry-Collins, Frank Simms and Andre Smith

== Production ==
- Jay Landers – executive producer
- Bambi Moé – executive producer
- Howie Lindeman – recording (1–7, 9), mixing (1–7, 9)
- Jeremy Smith – recording (8)
- Bill Schnee – mixing (8)
- Dragan Čačinović-Čač – assistant engineer (1–7, 9)
- Greg Gasperino – assistant engineer (1–7, 9)
- Ken Ross – assistant engineer (1–7, 9)
- Greg Calbi – mastering at Masterdisk (New York, NY)
- Joan Martin – production coordinator
- Robert Abriola – art direction
- Caroline Ford – photography

2003 reissue

- Benjamin Newberry – mixing
- Peter Graeme – art direction

== Release history ==
The Christmas Album release history
| Region | Date | Edition(s) | Format(s) | Label(s) | Ref. |
|---|---|---|---|---|---|
| Various | November 4, 1997 | The Christmas Album | CD; cassette | Capitol Records | |
| Various | July 22, 2003 | Holiday | CD; cassette | Punahele Productions | |
