= Set the Night to Music =

1988 single by Starship

Single by Starship

from the album No Protection
- B-side: "I Don't Know Why"
- Released: February 1988
- Genre: Soft rock
- Length: 4:12
- Label: RCA
- Songwriter: Diane Warren
- Producer: Peter Wolf

Starship singles chronology
"Beat Patrol" (1987)	"Set the Night to Music" (1988)	"Wild Again" (1988)

"Set the Night to Music"

Single by Roberta Flack

from the album Set the Night to Music
- B-side: "Natural Thing"
- Released: September 1991
- Genre: Soul, adult contemporary
- Length: 4:39
- Label: Atlantic
- Songwriter: Diane Warren
- Producer: Arif Mardin

Roberta Flack singles chronology
"Shock to My System" (1989)	"Set the Night to Music" (1991)	"You Make Me Feel Brand New" (1992)

"Set the Night to Music" is a song written by Diane Warren and recorded by American rock band Starship for their second LP, No Protection (1987). It became a major hit for American singer Roberta Flack in 1991. Starship's original version became a Top-10 hit on the US Billboard Adult Contemporary chart, reaching number nine in the spring of 1988, and also charted minorly in Canada. The song appeared at the end credits of the 1988 fantasy-comedy film Vice Versa starring Judge Reinhold and Fred Savage.

Cash Box said of the Starship version that "punctuated by lush strings and acoustic guitars, it's as warm and appealing a ballad as they have ever put on record."

== Roberta Flack cover ==
Roberta Flack covered "Set the Night to Music" as a duet with Maxi Priest. The song is the title track to Flack's album Set the Night to Music (1991).

Flack's rendition reached number six on the US Billboard Hot 100 and number nine in Canada; it was her final charting Billboard Hot 100 hit. The song was a bigger Adult Contemporary hit, reaching number two in the US and number one in Canada.

=== Personnel ===
- Roberta Flack – lead vocals
- Robbie Kondor – keyboards, programming, arrangements
- Sammy Merendino – drum programming
- Errol "Crusher" Bennett – percussion
- Arif Mardin – string arrangements and conductor
- Gene Orloff – concertmaster
- Jerry Barnes – backing vocals
- Katreese Barnes – backing vocals
- Maxi Priest – lead vocals

== Charts ==
=== Weekly charts ===
Starship

Chart (1988)	Peak position
Canada Top Singles (RPM)	92
US Adult Contemporary (Billboard)	9

Roberta Flack

Chart (1991–1992)	Peak position
Australia (ARIA)	80
Canada Top Singles (RPM)	9
Canada Adult Contemporary (RPM)	1
Europe (European Hit Radio)	38
UK Airplay (Music Week)	40
US Billboard Hot 100	6
US Adult Contemporary (Billboard)	2
US Hot R&B/Hip-Hop Songs (Billboard)	45
US Cash Box Top 100	5

=== Year-end charts ===
Chart (1991)	Rank
Canada Top Singles (RPM)	67
Canada Adult Contemporary (RPM)	17

Chart (1992)	Rank
Brazil (Crowley)	87
US Adult Contemporary (Billboard)	38
US Cash Box Top 100	48
