= The First Time Ever I Saw Your Face =

1957 folk song, became 1972 US hit

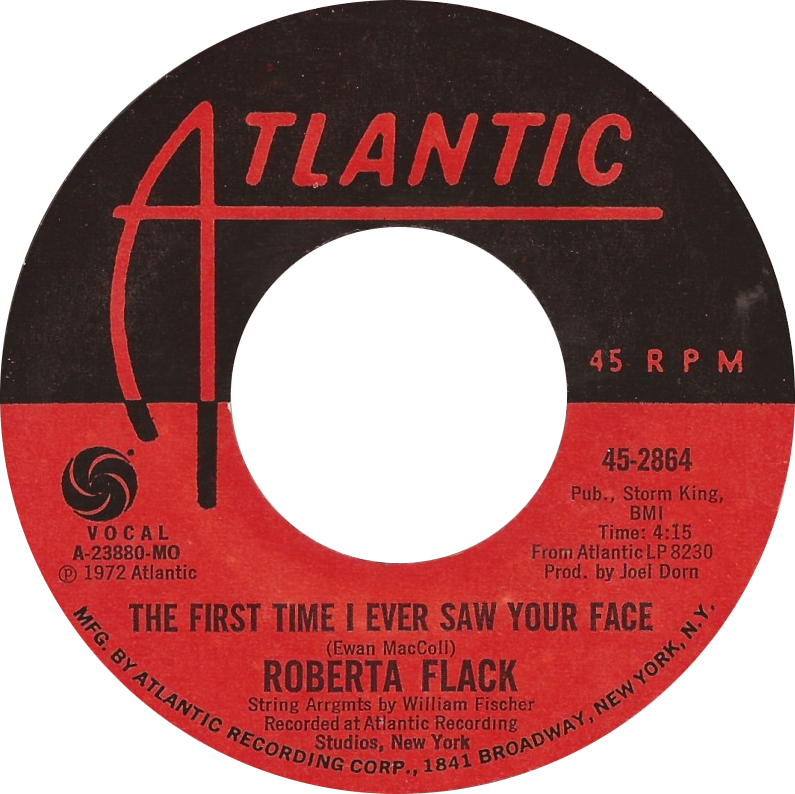
- Side A of the US single

Single by Roberta Flack

from the album First Take
- B-side: "Trade Winds"
- Released: March 7, 1972
- Recorded: February 1969
- Studio: Atlantic (New York)
- Genre: Soul; vocal jazz
- Length: 5:22 (album version); 4:29 (radio edit)
- Label: Atlantic
- Songwriter: Ewan MacColl
- Producer: Joel Dorn

Roberta Flack singles chronology
| "Will You Still Love Me Tomorrow" (1972) | "The First Time Ever I Saw Your Face" (1972) | "Where Is the Love" (1972) |

Audio
- "The First Time Ever I Saw Your Face" on YouTube

"The First Time Ever I Saw Your Face" is a 1957 folk-style song written by British political singer-songwriter Ewan MacColl for Peggy Seeger, who later became his third wife. At that time, MacColl was still married to his second wife, Jean Newlove. During the 1960s, it was recorded by various singers and became a major international hit for Roberta Flack in 1972, winning Grammy Awards for Record of the Year and Song of the Year. Billboard ranked it as the number-one Hot 100 single of the year for 1972. Celine Dion enjoyed a UK chart hit with the song in 2000, and Leona Lewis also charted with it in 2007.

== History ==
The song was written by Ewan MacColl after Peggy Seeger asked him to write a piece for a show she was performing in at the time. He wrote it quickly and taught it to Seeger over the telephone. Seeger later provided additional background. She had begun an affair with MacColl in London in 1956 but later returned to the U.S. in part to distance herself because he was already married with a child. They remained in contact by phone, and MacColl also sent her tapes to listen to while they were apart. The following year, when Seeger was working for a radio show in Los Angeles, she told MacColl that the producers wanted a "hopeful love song" because the folk material she performed was mostly sad. During one of his calls from England, MacColl sang the new song to her. Although the song was written about MacColl and Seeger, she said she did not interpret it that way at the time because she was not "in love" with him, and she performed it from his perspective instead. Seeger performed the song in Los Angeles and later in Chicago, but MacColl never recorded it after singing it to her.

Although Seeger was the first to perform the song live at folk concerts, she did not release her version until 1962. The earliest recording was made in 1961 by Bonnie Dobson and issued on her June 1961 debut album, She's Like a Swallow and Other Folk Songs. Dobson first heard Seeger perform it at the Colorado Folk Festival on October 31, 1960, and learned the lyrics after hearing other performers sing it at later concerts.

MacColl made no secret of his dislike for the cover versions. His daughter-in-law wrote: "He hated all of them. He had a special section in his record collection for them, entitled 'The Chamber of Horrors'. He said that the Elvis version was like Romeo at the bottom of the Post Office Tower singing up to Juliet. The other versions, he thought, were travesties: bludgeoning, histrionic, and lacking in grace." Peggy Seeger said she disliked Roberta Flack's interpretation when it became a hit but has since "come to like it a lot".

== Roberta Flack version ==
"The First Time Ever I Saw Your Face"
Roberta Flack's "The First Time Ever I Saw Your Face" from First Take

Roberta Flack on "The First Time Ever I Saw Your Face"
"It's a perfect song. Second only to 'Amazing Grace', I think.... It's the kind of song that has two unique and distinct qualities: it tells a story, and it has lyrics that mean something....Because of [its meaningful lyrics] the [song] can be interpreted by a lot of people in a lot of different ways: the love of a mother for a child, for example, or [that of] two lovers.... I wish more songs I had chosen had moved me the way that one did. I've loved [most] every song I've recorded, but that one was pretty special."

The song was popularized by Roberta Flack in a version that became a breakout hit for the singer in 1971–1972. The single became a sleeper hit more than three years after its original 1969 release on her album First Take, partly because it was used in Clint Eastwood's 1971 directorial debut Play Misty for Me. Flack's recording later topped the Billboard Year-End Hot 100 singles of 1972 more than three years after it was recorded.

Flack first heard the song through the Joe & Eddie rendition, which appeared on the folk duo's 1963 album Coast to Coast (as "The First Time"). Her friend, singer Donal Leace, brought the track to her attention. After teaching the song to the young girls in the glee club at Banneker High School in Washington, D.C., Flack performed it regularly at Mr. Henry's, a club on Pennsylvania Avenue where she became the resident singer in 1968. In February 1969, she recorded the song for her debut album First Take. Her rendition was considerably slower than Seeger's original, running more than twice the two-and-a-half-minute length of Seeger's version. Flack later said that during the recording session she was grieving the loss of her pet cat, which had been run over by a car.

Flack's slow and intimate version, chosen by Clint Eastwood for Play Misty for Me, accompanied a love scene with Eastwood and actress Donna Mills. Flack recalled that Eastwood heard her recording on his car radio while driving on a Los Angeles freeway, then phoned her at her Alexandria, Virginia home. According to Flack, Eastwood said: "'I'd like to use your song in this movie...about a disc jockey [with] a lot of music in it. I'd use it in the only part of the movie where there's absolute love.'" She agreed, and they discussed payment. Eastwood paid $2,000 to use the recording, and when Flack said she wanted to re-record it at a faster tempo, he replied: "No, it's not [too slow]."

Flack also recalled that during the First Take sessions, producer Joel Dorn suggested re-recording the track with a slightly faster tempo and a lyric edit to shorten its running time. Flack declined: "Joel said: 'Okay, you don't care if it's a hit or not?' I said: 'No sir.'" Dorn's view proved correct three years later, after Eastwood's use of the song brought new attention to it. Following the November 1971 release of Play Misty for Me, the track's popularity surged, prompting Atlantic Records to issue it as a single — shortened by one minute — in February 1972. The single became a major hit in the United States, reaching number one for six weeks on both the Billboard Hot 100 and the easy listening charts in spring 1972, and peaking at number four on the R&B chart. It reached number 14 on the UK Singles Chart, and was number one for three weeks on the singles chart in Canada's RPM magazine.

"The First Time Ever I Saw Your Face" was used as wake-up music for the astronauts aboard Apollo 17 on flight day 9 (Friday, December 15, 1972), their final day in lunar orbit before returning to Earth. Apollo 17 marked the last human exploration of the Moon. The choice of the song may have been inspired by the Moon's face visible below the spacecraft.

=== Charts ===
==== Weekly charts ====
1972 weekly chart performance
| Chart (1972) | Peak position |
|---|---|
| Australia (Go-Set) | 1 |
| Canada Top Singles (RPM) | 1 |
| Canada Adult Contemporary (RPM) | 1 |
| Netherlands (Dutch Top 40) | 9 |
| Netherlands (Single Top 100) | 6 |
| New Zealand (Listener) | 17 |
| South Africa (Springbok) | 2 |
| UK Singles (Official Charts) | 14 |
| US Billboard Hot 100 | 1 |
| US Best Selling Soul Singles (Billboard) | 4 |
| US Easy Listening (Billboard) | 1 |
| US Cash Box Top 100 | 1 |

2025 weekly chart performance
| Chart (2025) | Peak position |
|---|---|
| US R&B/Hip-Hop Digital Song Sales (Billboard) | 4 |

==== Year-end charts ====
Year-end chart performance
| Chart (1972) | Position |
|---|---|
| Canada Top Singles (RPM) | 16 |
| Netherlands (Dutch Top 40) | 96 |
| Netherlands (Single Top 100) | 75 |
| South Africa | 17 |
| US Billboard Hot 100 | 1 |
| US Top Easy Listening Singles (Billboard) | 5 |
| US Top Soul Singles (Billboard) | 44 |
| US Cash Box Top 100 | 19 |

==== All-time charts ====
All-time chart performance
| Chart (1958–2018) | Position |
|---|---|
| US Billboard Hot 100 | 140 |

==== Certifications ====
Certifications
| Region | Certification | Certified units/sales |
|---|---|---|
| New Zealand (RMNZ) | Gold | 15,000^{‡} |
| United Kingdom (BPI) Sales since 2006 | Platinum | 600,000^{‡} |
| United States (RIAA) | Gold | 1,000,000^{^} |
^{^} Shipments figures based on certification alone.^{‡} Sales+streaming figures based on certification alone.

== Cover versions ==
Several artists have recorded their own renditions of "The First Time Ever I Saw Your Face", and some of these versions entered national and international music charts.

Canadian singer Celine Dion performed "The First Time Ever I Saw Your Face" throughout her 1998–99 Let's Talk About Love World Tour and later recorded it in studio for her 1999 greatest hits album All the Way... A Decade of Song. She also included it in two television specials: These Are Special Times (1998) and All the Way... A Decade of Song (1999). Dion's version was issued as the second single from All the Way... A Decade of Song in the United Kingdom and Ireland, where it was released on March 27, 2000. It entered the top 20 in the United Kingdom, where it peaked at number 19, and also reached number 19 in Scotland, while in Ireland it peaked at number 32. Based on its performance in these markets, the song appeared on the European Hot 100 Singles, where it reached number 76. Roberta Flack publicly praised Dion's interpretation. Three days before her death in February 2025, she shared a clip of Dion performing the song during the 1999 television special All the Way... A Decade of Song and wrote that she was "touched and thrilled" to present "the wondrous Celine Dion adding her luminous shine" to the piece.

British singer Leona Lewis recorded the song in 2007. Her version charted in the United Kingdom, where it reached number 73. The Glee cast released a cover in 2012. It reached number 70 on the US Billboard Hot 100 and entered the Canadian Hot 100 at number 78. English singer Matt Cardle also recorded the song in 2012. His version charted in the United Kingdom, peaking at number 92.

== See also ==
- Love at first sight
- List of Billboard Hot 100 number ones of 1972
- List of Billboard Easy Listening number ones of 1972
- List of number-one singles in Australia during the 1970s
- List of number-one singles of 1972 (Canada)
