= Feel Like Makin' Love (Roberta Flack song) =

1974 single by Roberta Flack

Single by Roberta Flack

from the album Feel Like Makin' Love
- B-side: "When You Smile"
- Released: June 10, 1974
- Genre: Soul; jazz; R&B
- Length: 2:55
- Label: Atlantic
- Songwriter: Eugene McDaniels
- Producer: Rubina Flake

Roberta Flack singles chronology
"Jesse" (1973)	"Feel Like Makin' Love" (1974)	"Feelin' That Glow" (1975)

"Feel Like Makin' Love"
17-second sample of Roberta Flack's recording

"Feel Like Makin' Love" is a song composed by singer-songwriter and producer Eugene McDaniels, and recorded originally by soul singer-songwriter Roberta Flack. The lyrics describe times that the singer feels romantic, including "watching winter turn to spring" and "holding hands by candlelight." The song peaked atop the singles chart in Canada and the U.S. Billboard Hot 100. It received three Grammy Award nominations for Record of the Year, Song of the Year, and Best Female Pop Vocal Performance.

"Feel Like Makin' Love" has been covered by various R&B and jazz artists including D’Angelo, Roy Ayers, Gladys Knight & the Pips, Lou Rawls, Isaac Hayes, George Benson, Shirley Bassey, Jeffrey Osborne, Larry Coryell, Johnny Mathis, Marlena Shaw.

== Reception ==
Released nine months before the album of the same title, the song scored a week at number 1 on the Billboard Hot 100 singles chart. It was Flack's third #1 single, making her the first female vocalist since 1940 to top the chart in three consecutive years. "Feel Like Makin' Love" also had five weeks at #1 on the Hot Soul Singles chart. and two weeks at #1 on the Adult Contemporary charts of both Canada and the U.S. Flack co-produced the record under the pseudonym Rubina Flake, with Eugene McDaniels. It went on to receive three Grammy nominations for Flack: Record of the Year, Song of the Year, and Best Female Pop Vocal Performance.

Upon the single release, Record World said that it "isn't as poetic as 'Killing Me Softly,' but what Roberta brings to it will make this her biggest record since."

== Charts ==
=== Weekly charts ===
Chart (1974)	Peak position
Australia (Kent Music Report)	13
Canadian Top Singles (RPM)	1
Canadian Adult Contemporary (RPM)	1
France	10
Netherlands	29
UK Singles Chart	34
US Billboard Hot 100	1
US Billboard Hot Soul Singles	1
US Billboard Easy Listening	1
US Cash Box Top 100	1

Chart (2025)	Peak position
US R&B Digital Song Sales (Billboard)	8

=== Year-end charts ===
Chart (1974)	Rank
Australia (Kent Music Report)	94
Canada RPM Top Singles	21
US Billboard Hot 100	35
US Billboard Easy Listening	21
US Cash Box Top 100	33

== George Benson version ==
"Feel Like Makin' Love"

Single by George Benson

from the album In Your Eyes
- Released: July 1, 1983
- Genre: Synth-pop; Funk; R&B
- Length: 4:22
- Label: Warner Bros.
- Songwriter: Eugene McDaniels
- Producer: Arif Mardin

George Benson singles chronology
"Lady Love Me (One More Time)" (1983)	"Feel Like Makin' Love" (1983)	"In Your Eyes" (1983)

In 1983, George Benson recorded a cover version of "Feel Like Makin' Love" which appeared on the album In Your Eyes. Compared to the original, which is a ballad, this version is danceable and therefore very funk-heavy. In addition to the studio album, it is also included on the Original Album Series Vol. 2, The Ultimate Collection, and 1983 [2017] compilations.

=== Track listing ===
7" Single

1. Feel Like Makin' Love 4:22
2. Use Me 4:23

=== Charts ===
Chart (1983)	Peak position
UK Singles (OCC)	28
Ireland (IRMA)	18

== D'Angelo version ==
"Feel Like Makin' Love"

Single by D'Angelo

from the album Voodoo
- Released: April 8, 2000
- Recorded: 1999
- Studio: Electric Lady, New York City
- Genre: Funk; R&B; neo soul
- Length: 6:22
- Label: Virgin
- Songwriter: Eugene McDaniels
- Producers: J. Dilla; D'Angelo

D'Angelo singles chronology
"Send It On" (2000)	"Feel Like Makin' Love" (2000)	"Be Here" (2002)

American R&B and neo soul musician D'Angelo covered the song for his second studio album Voodoo (2000). It was released April 8, 2000, on Virgin Records as the album's fifth and last single. His cover version features a quiet storm radio-style sound and heavy use of multi-tracking for vocals. It was initially planned as a duet with R&B singer Lauryn Hill. Although tapes were sent via FedEx between the two, the collaboration between D'Angelo and Hill was aborted and the song was instead recorded solo. According to producer and drummer Questlove, the duet failed to materialize due to "too many middle men.... I don't think Lauryn and D ever talked face-to-face." Mistakenly, some critics who later reviewed the album's track assumed that Lauryn Hill's vocals are present in the recording.

According to Questlove's review of Voodoo at Okayplayer, the song's production was also managed by late hip hop producer J Dilla, as Questlove stated "Jay Dee did the Lauryn track". Dilla, however, did not receive an official credit for the song. As a single, "Feel Like Makin' Love" was Voodoo's least successful, as it only reached #109 on the Billboard Hot R&B/Hip-Hop Singles & Tracks chart.

=== Charts ===
Chart (2000)	Peak position
US Bubbling Under R&B/Hip-Hop Singles	9

== Other versions ==
The song has been covered by many artists. Among the most notable are:

- An instrumental version by Bob James for his 1974 album One, reaching #88 on the Hot 100. This version was later used in the Breaking Bad episode "Bit by a Dead Bee".
- An Estonian-language version by Velly Joonas, "Käes on aeg", was recorded in 1980, but did not gain mass popularity until it was re-released in 2015.
- Lumidee covered it in her 2007 album, Unexpected, and released it as a single.
- Celeste Legaspi covered it in 1976 with her song "Pag-ibig Na Lubos Lubos."
- Guitarist Toshiki Soejima's live version has over 6M views on Youtube as of late 2025.

== See also ==
- List of RPM number-one singles of 1974
- List of Hot 100 number-one singles of 1974 (U.S.)
- List of number-one R&B singles of 1974 (U.S.)
- List of number-one adult contemporary singles of 1974 (U.S.)

== Notes ==
=== References ===
- Saul Williams, D'Angelo (2000). Voodoo (CD issue liner notes). Virgins Records America, Inc., 338 N. Foothill Road, Beverly Hills, CA 90210.
