= Roberta Flack =

American singer (1937–2025)

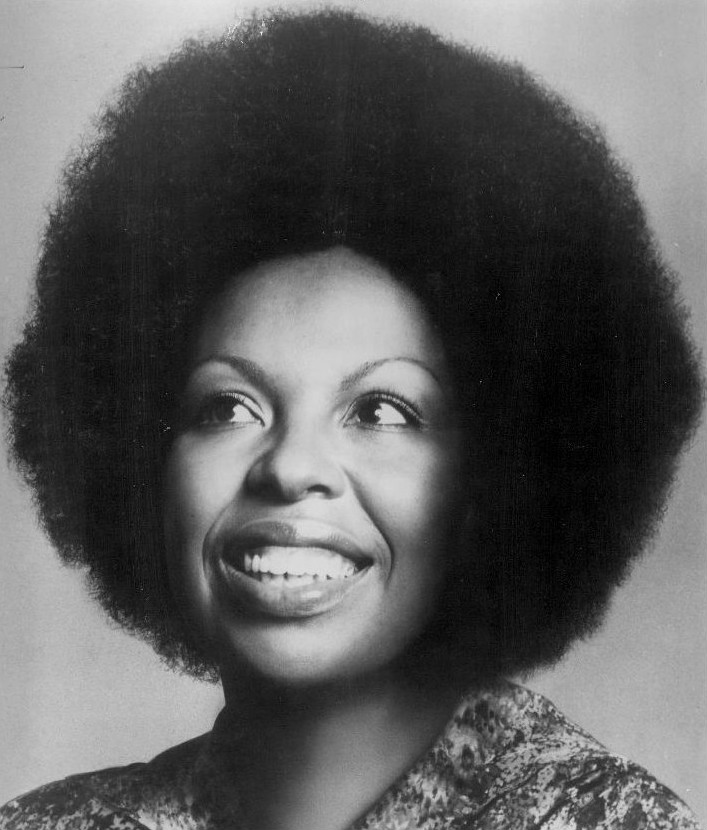
- Flack in 1976
- Born: Roberta Cleopatra Flack; February 10, 1937; Black Mountain, North Carolina, U.S.
- Died: February 24, 2025 (aged 88); New York City, U.S.
- Other name: Rubina Flake
- Education: Howard University
- Occupations: Singer; songwriter; musician
- Spouse: Steve Novosel (m. 1966; div. 1972)
- Relatives: Rory Flack (niece); Bernard Wright (godson)
- Musical career
- Genres: R&B; folk; jazz; soul
- Instruments: Vocals; keyboards
- Works: Full list
- Years active: 1968–2022
- Labels: Atlantic (1968–1996); Angel / Capitol (1997); RAS / 429 / Sony/ATV (2011–2018)
- Website: robertaflack.com

Roberta Cleopatra Flack (February 10, 1937 – February 24, 2025) was an American singer and pianist known for her emotive, genre-blending ballads that spanned R&B, jazz, folk and pop, and contributed to the birth of the quiet storm radio format. Her commercial success included the Billboard Hot 100 chart-topping singles "The First Time Ever I Saw Your Face", "Killing Me Softly with His Song", and "Feel Like Makin' Love". She became the first artist to win the Grammy Award for Record of the Year in consecutive years.

Flack frequently collaborated with Donny Hathaway, with whom she recorded several hit duets, including "Where Is the Love" and "The Closer I Get to You". She was one of the defining voices of 1970s popular music and remained active in the industry, later finding success with duets such as "Tonight, I Celebrate My Love" with Peabo Bryson (1983) and "Set the Night to Music" with Maxi Priest (1991). Across her decades-long career, she interpreted works by songwriters such as Leonard Cohen and members of the Beatles. In 2020, Flack received the Grammy Lifetime Achievement Award.

== Early life and education ==
Flack was born on February 10, 1937, (Note: Motown Encyclopedia gives her birth year as 1939, but says: "(although some sources state the year of birth to be 1937)".) in Black Mountain, North Carolina, United States, to parents Laron Flack, a jazz pianist and U.S. Veterans Administration draftsman, and Irene (née Council) Flack a church organist, choir director and music teacher. Her family moved to Richmond, Virginia, before settling in Arlington, Virginia, when she was five years old.

Her first musical experiences were in church. She grew up in a large musical family and often provided piano accompaniment for the choir of Lomax African Methodist Episcopal Zion Church singing hymns and spirituals. She occasionally sang at the Macedonia Baptist Church in Arlington. Her father acquired a battered old piano for her, which she learned to play sitting on her mother's lap, officially beginning formal piano lessons when she was nine. She gravitated towards classical music and during her early teens excelled at classical piano, finishing second in a statewide competition for Black students aged 13 playing a Scarlatti sonata. This won her a full music scholarship to Howard University in Washington, D.C.,, but her parents made her wait until she turned 15, enrolling in 1952, where she was one of the youngest students ever to be accepted. She eventually changed her major from piano to voice and became assistant conductor of the university choir. Her direction of a production of Giuseppe Verdi's opera Aida received a standing ovation from the Howard University faculty. At Howard she met her future collaborator, Donny Hathaway.

Flack became a student teacher at a school near Chevy Chase, Maryland. She graduated from Howard University at 19 and began graduate studies in music there, but after the sudden death of her father she had to find work to support herself. She took a job teaching music and English at a small, segregated high school in Farmville, North Carolina, for which she was paid $2,800 a year.

== Career ==
=== Early career ===
Before becoming a professional singer-songwriter, Flack returned to Washington, D.C., and taught at Banneker, Browne, and Rabaut Junior High Schools. She also taught private piano lessons out of her home on Euclid Street, NW, in the city. During that time, her music career began to take shape on evenings and weekends in nightclubs.

At the Tivoli Theatre, she accompanied opera singers at the piano. During intermissions, she would sing blues, folk, and pop standards in a back room, accompanying herself on the piano. Later she performed several nights a week at the 1520 Club, providing her own piano accompaniment. About this time her voice teacher, Frederick "Wilkie" Wilkerson, told her that he saw a brighter future for her in pop music than in the classics. Flack modified her repertoire accordingly and her reputation spread. In 1968, she began singing professionally after she was hired to perform regularly at Mr. Henry's Restaurant, located on Capitol Hill in Washington, D.C.

Her break came in the summer of 1968 when she performed at a benefit concert in Washington to raise funds for a children's library in the city's ghetto district, and was seen by soul and jazz singer Les McCann, who was signed to Atlantic Records. He was captivated by Flack's voice and arranged an audition for her with Atlantic, in which she performed 42 songs from her nightclub repertoire in three hours for producer Joel Dorn. Dorn immediately told the label to sign her. In November 1968, she recorded 39 song demos in less than 10 hours. McCann later wrote in the liner notes of her first album: "Her voice touched, tapped, trapped, and kicked every emotion I've ever known. I laughed, cried, and screamed for more... she alone had the voice." Three months later, Atlantic recorded Flack's debut album, First Take (1969), in 10 hours. The album was "an elegant fusion of folk, jazz and soul" and included her version of British folk singer Ewan McColl's song "The First Time Ever I Saw Your Face".

=== 1970s ===
Flack's second album, Chapter Two, was released in 1970 and marked the start of her collaboration with Hathaway as arranger, accompanist and backing singer. In 1971, Flack participated in the legendary Soul to Soul concert film by Denis Sanders, which was headlined by Wilson Pickett, along with Ike & Tina Turner, Santana, The Staple Singers, Les McCann, Eddie Harris, The Voices of East Harlem and others. The U.S. delegation of musical artists featured in the film was invited to perform for the 14th anniversary of the March 6 Independence Day of Ghana. The film was digitally reissued on DVD and CD in 2004 but for unknown reasons Flack refused permission for her image and recording to be included. Her a cappella performance of the traditional spiritual "Oh Freedom", retitled "Freedom Song" on the original Soul to Soul LP soundtrack, is only available in the VHS version of the film.

Flack's cover version of "Will You Love Me Tomorrow" hit No. 76 on the Billboard Hot 100 in 1972. Her Atlantic recordings did not sell particularly well, until actor/director Clint Eastwood used a song from First Take, "The First Time Ever I Saw Your Face", written by Ewan MacColl, for the soundtrack of his directorial debut Play Misty for Me.

Atlantic rush-released the song as a single and it became the biggest hit of 1972, spending six consecutive weeks at No. 1 and earning Flack a million-selling gold disc. "The First Time Ever I Saw Your Face" finished the year as Billboard's top song of 1972. The First Take album also went to No. 1 and eventually sold 1.9 million copies in the United States. Eastwood, who paid $2,000 for the use of the song in the film, remained an admirer and friend of Flack's ever after. The song was awarded the Grammy Award for Record of the Year and Song of the Year in 1973. In 1983, Flack recorded the end music to the Dirty Harry film Sudden Impact, at Eastwood's request.

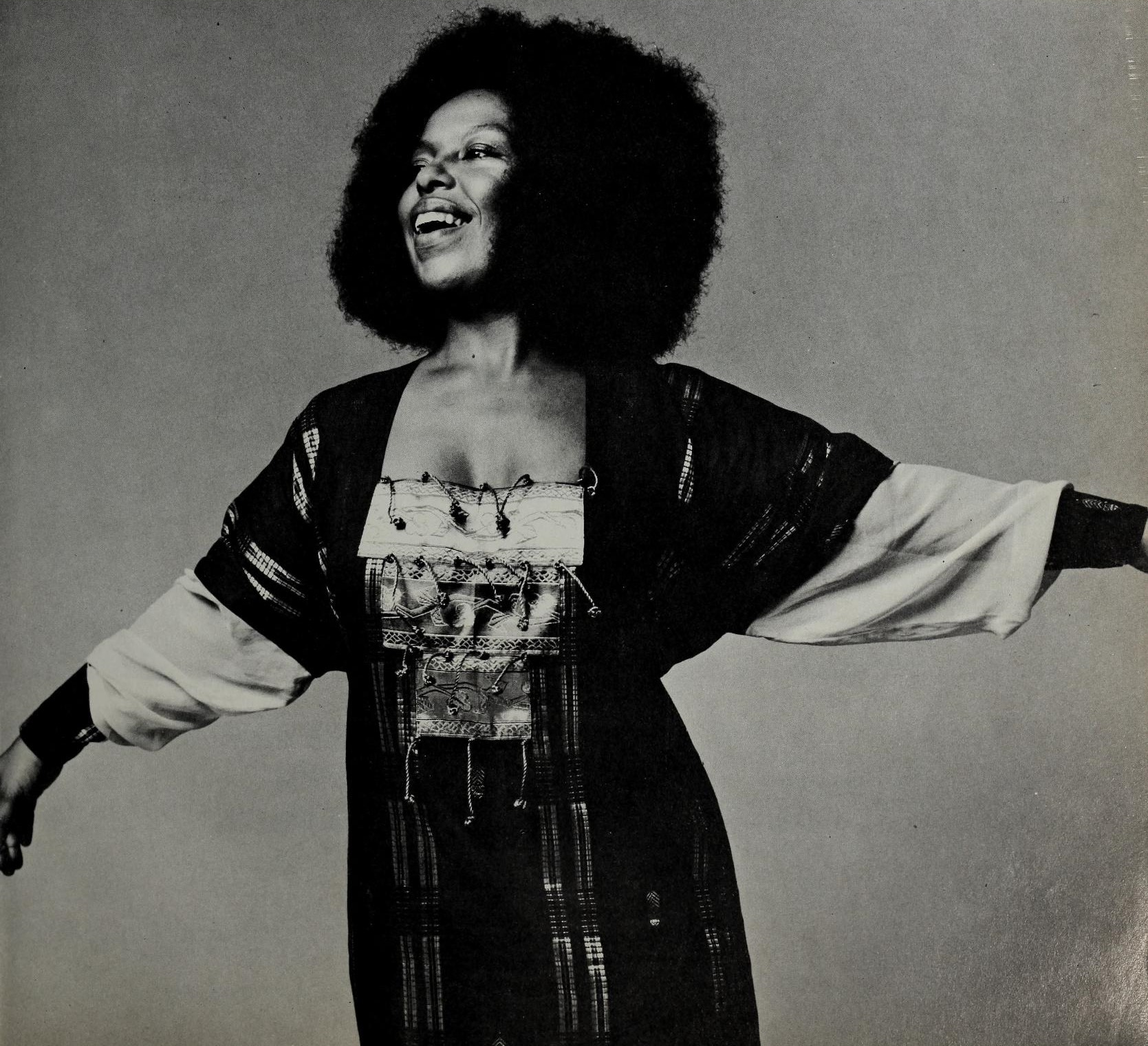
Flack on the cover of Cash Box, April 22, 1972

In 1972, Flack began recording regularly with Donny Hathaway, scoring hits such as the Grammy-winning "Where Is the Love" (1972) and later "The Closer I Get to You" (1978), both of which became million-selling gold singles. Flack and Hathaway recorded several duets together, including two LPs, until Hathaway's death in 1979. After his death, Flack released their final LP as Roberta Flack Featuring Donny Hathaway.

On her own, Flack scored her second No. 1 hit in 1973, "Killing Me Softly with His Song", written by Charles Fox, Norman Gimbel l, and Lori Lieberman. "Killing Me Softly" was awarded both Record of the Year and Best Pop Vocal Performance, Female, at the 1974 Grammy Awards. Its parent album was Flack's biggest-selling disc, eventually earning double platinum certification. In 1974, Flack released "Feel Like Makin' Love", which became her third and final No. 1 hit to date on the Hot 100 and her eighth million-seller. She produced the single and her 1975 album of the same name under the pseudonym Rubina Flake. In 1974, Flack sang the lead on a Sherman Brothers song, "Freedom", which featured prominently at the opening and closing of the movie Huckleberry Finn. In the same year, she performed "When We Grow Up" with a teenage Michael Jackson on the television special Free to Be... You and Me, and a year later in 1975 performed two Johnny Marks songs, "To Love And Be Loved" and "When Autumn Comes", for the animated Christmas special The Tiny Tree. Blue Lights in the Basement (1977) included a chart-topping duet with Hathaway on "The Closer I Get to You", and in 1978 they began working on a second album of duets, which was half-completed when Hathaway, a paranoid schizophrenic who suffered mood swings and bouts of depression, took his own life in 1979. Flack, devastated, completed the album and it was released in 1980 as "Roberta Flack featuring Donny Hathaway".

=== 1980–1991 ===
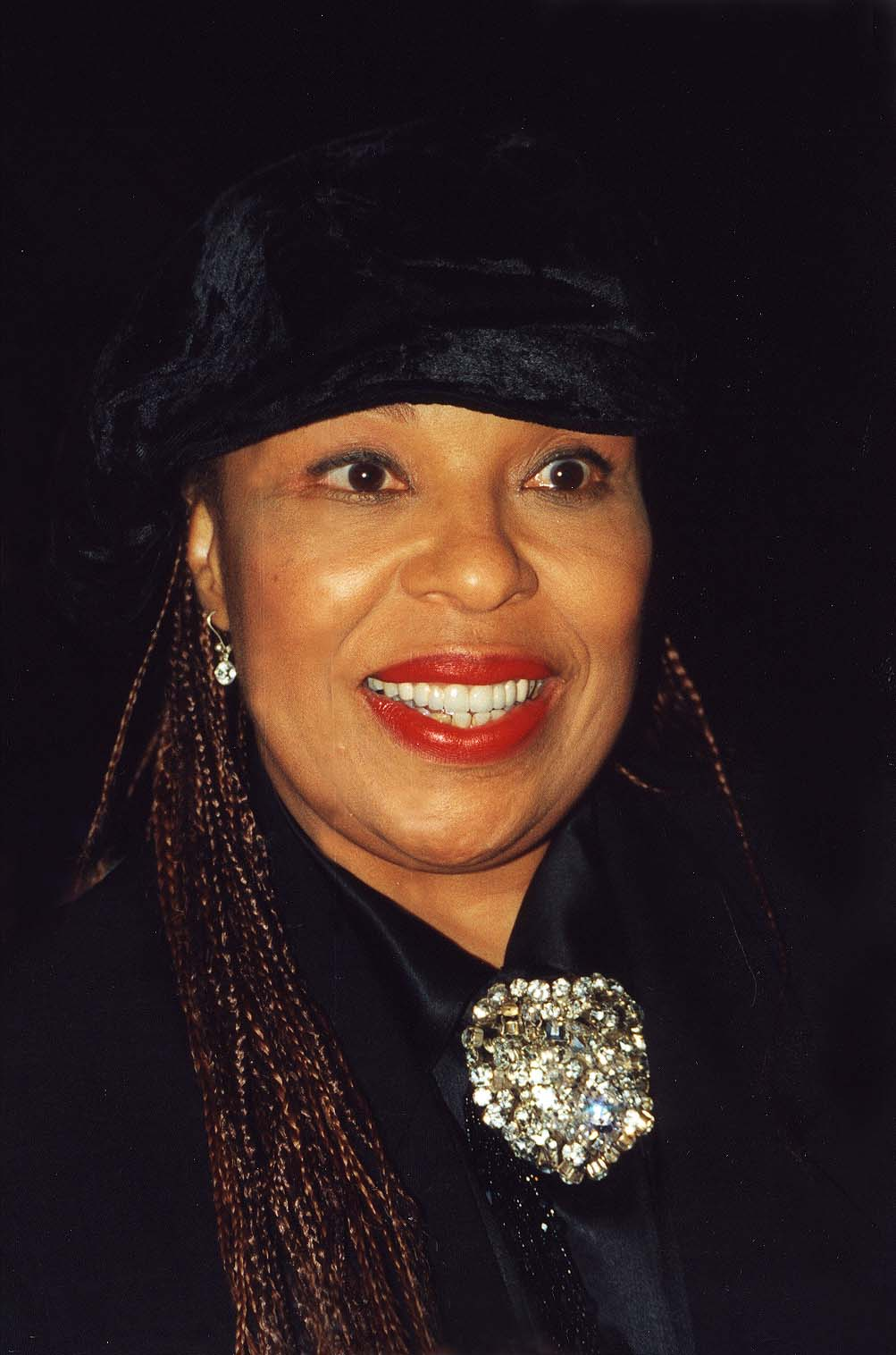
Flack in 1995

She found a new duetting partner in Peabo Bryson and they released "Live and More" in 1980. "Born to Love" in 1983 produced a hit single, "Tonight, I Celebrate My Love", which reached No. 2 on the UK charts. Flack had a hit single in 1982 with "Making Love", written by Burt Bacharach (the title track of the 1982 film of the same name), which reached No. 13.

Flack continued to tour in the 1980s, often backed by a live orchestra. In 1984 Flack recorded a version of Yoko Ono's song 'Goodbye Sadness' for Ono's mourning of John Lennon's death, as she had become particularly close with Ono, her New York next door neighbour, after the death. In 1986, she sang the theme song "Together Through the Years" for the NBC television series Valerie, later known as The Hogan Family. The song was used throughout the show's six seasons. In 1987, Flack supplied the voice of Michael Jackson's mother in the 18-minute short film for "Bad". Oasis was released in 1988 and failed to make an impact with pop audiences, though the title track reached No. 1 on the R&B chart and a remix of "Uh-Uh Ooh-Ooh Look Out (Here It Comes)" topped the dance chart in 1989, after failing to chart on the Billboard Hot 100.

In 1991, Flack found herself again in the US Top 10 with a cover of the Diane Warren-penned song "Set the Night to Music", performed as a duet with British-Jamaican reggae singer Maxi Priest, which peaked at No. 6 on the Billboard Hot 100 charts and No. 2 AC. In 1996, The Fugees released a hip-hop remix of "Killing Me Softly".

=== Later career ===
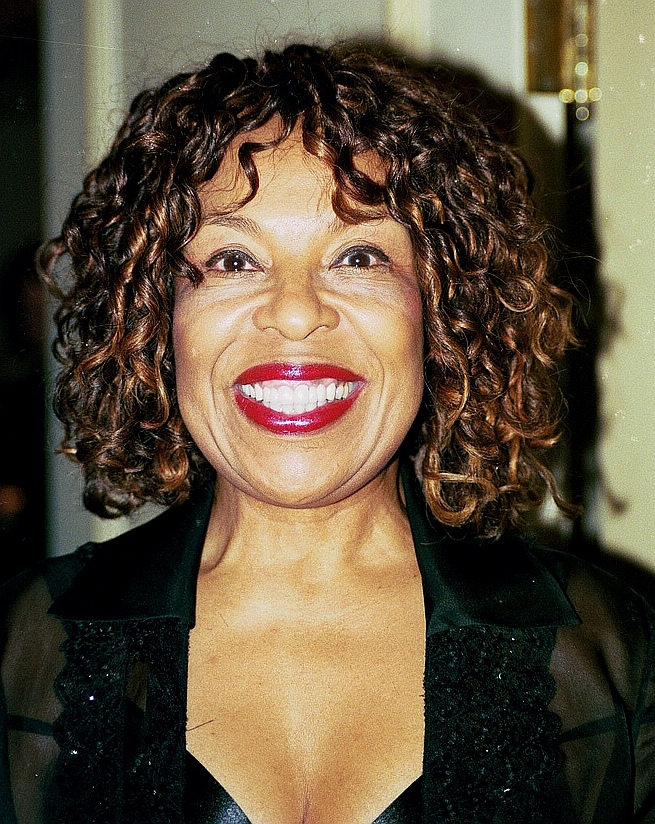
Flack in 2002

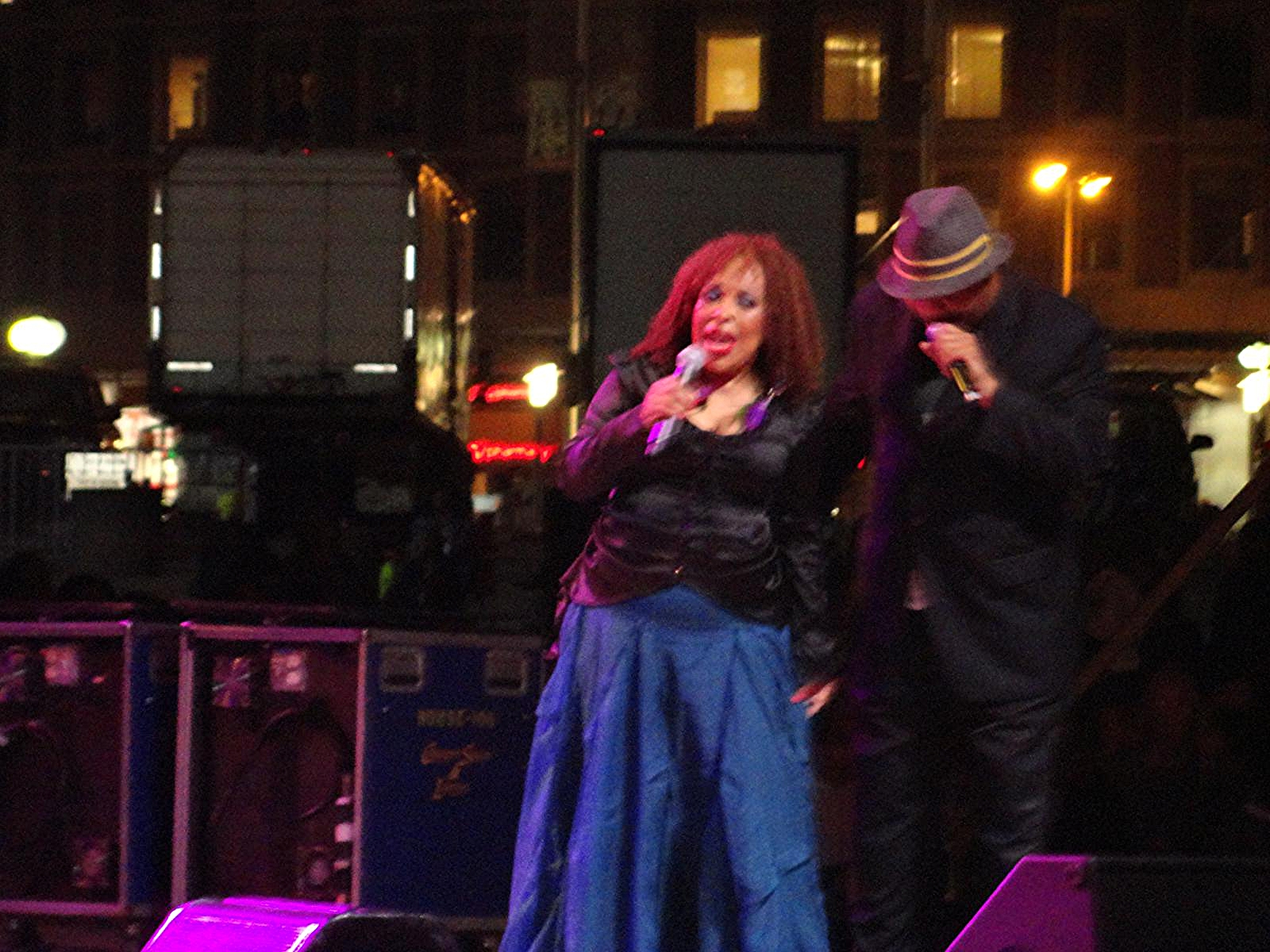
Flack performing in 2013

In 1999, a star with Flack's name was placed on the Hollywood Walk of Fame. In the same year, she gave a concert tour in South Africa. During her tour of the country, she performed "Killing Me Softly" for President Nelson Mandela at his home in Johannesburg. In 2010, she appeared on the 52nd Annual Grammy Awards, singing a duet of "Where Is The Love" with Maxwell.

Flack influenced the subgenre of contemporary R&B called quiet storm, and interpreted songs by songwriters such as Leonard Cohen and members of the Beatles.

In February 2012, Flack released Let It Be Roberta, an album of Beatles covers including "Hey Jude" and "Let It Be". It was her first recording in eight years. Flack knew John Lennon and Yoko Ono as the Ono-Lennon's and Flack had lived in adjoining apartments in The Dakota apartment building in New York City in the 1980s. Each could hear the others' music through their common wall. Flack said that she had been asked to do a second album of Beatles covers. In 2013, she was reported to be involved in an interpretative album of the Beatles' classics.

At the age of 80, Flack recorded "Running" for the closing credits song of the 2018 feature documentary 3100: Run and Become with music and lyrics by Michael A. Levine. She continued to perform into her eighties until she was diagnosed with amyotrophic lateral sclerosis and could no longer sing.

== Artistry ==
In 1971, The Village Voice critic Robert Christgau reported that "Flack is generally regarded as the most significant new black woman singer since Aretha Franklin, and at moments she sounds kind, intelligent, and very likable. But she often exhibits the gratuitous gentility you'd expect of someone who says 'between you and I'." Reviewing her body of work from the 1970s, he argued later that the singer "has nothing whatsoever to do with rock and roll or rhythm and blues and almost nothing to do with soul", comparing her middle-of-the-road aesthetic to Barry Manilow but with better taste, which he believed does not necessarily guarantee more enduring music: "In the long run, pop lies are improved by vulgarity."

Writer and music critic Ann Powers argued in a 2020 piece for NPR that "Flack's presence looms over both R&B and indie "bedroom" pop as if she were one of the astral beings in Ava DuVernay's version of A Wrinkle In Time." Jason King argued that she occupied a complex place in popular music, as "the nature of her power as a performer—to generate rapturous, spellbinding mood music and to plumb the depths of soulful heaviness by way of classically-informed technique—is not too easy to claim or make sense with the limited tools that we have in music criticism."

Flack's minimalist, classically trained approach to her songs was seen by a number of critics as lacking in grit and uncharacteristic of soul music. According to music scholar Jason King, her work was regularly described with the adjectives "boring", "depressing", "lifeless", "studied", and "calculated", although in contrast, AllMusic's Steve Huey said it had been described as "classy, urbane, reserved, smooth, and sophisticated".

A February 2025 obituary in the Sunday Times of London stated: "She sang with flawless diction and an elegant, understated power" in a voice that was "soft and sensual, creating a radio-friendly crossover between jazz, R&B and easy listening." It further noted that Flack's classical training meant that she could accompany herself in any style on the piano.

== Personal life ==
Flack was a member of the Artist Empowerment Coalition, which advocated for artists to have the right to control their creative properties. She was also a spokeswoman for the American Society for the Prevention of Cruelty to Animals (ASPCA); her appearance in commercials for the ASPCA featured "The First Time Ever I Saw Your Face". The Hyde Leadership Charter School in the Bronx, NYC, (now called Leaders In Our Neighborhood Charter School) ran an after-school music program called "The Roberta Flack School of Music" to provide free music education to underprivileged students in partnership with Flack, who founded the school. Flack was also an advocate for gay rights, stating that "Love is love. Between a man and a woman, between two men, between two women. Love is universal, like music."

From 1966 to 1972, she was married to Steve Novosel. Flack was the aunt of professional ice skater Rory Flack. She was also the godmother of musician Bernard Wright, who died in an accident on May 19, 2022. For 40 years, Flack had an apartment in The Dakota building in New York City that was right next door to the apartment of Yoko Ono and John Lennon; their son, Sean, grew up calling her "Aunt Roberta". She also counted among her friends the activists Jesse Jackson and Angela Davis, as well as Maya Angelou, who co-wrote the song "And So It Goes" for Flack's 1988 album Oasis.

=== Illness and death ===
In 2018, Flack was appearing onstage at the Apollo Theater at a benefit for the Jazz Foundation of America when she became ill, left the stage and was rushed to the Harlem Hospital Center. In a statement, her manager announced that Flack had had a stroke a few years prior and still was not feeling well, but was "doing fine" and was being kept overnight for medical observation.

In late 2022, it was announced that Flack had been diagnosed with ALS and had retired from performing, as the disease was making it "impossible to sing".

Flack died of cardiac arrest on February 24, 2025, on her way to a hospital in Manhattan. She was 88 years old.

A memorial ceremony was held on March 10, 2025, at Abyssinian Baptist Church. Lauryn Hill sang a tribute performance of "The First Time Ever I Saw Your Face" and with Wyclef Jean and Stevie Wonder "Killing Me Softly with His Song". Stevie Wonder also sang “I Won’t Complain”, and Lisa Fischer sang “Somewhere”.

== Accolades ==
On May 11, 2017, Roberta Flack received an honorary Doctorate degree in the Arts from Long Island University. She was inducted into the North Carolina Music Hall of Fame in 2009. In 2021, Flack was one of the first inductees into the Women Songwriters Hall of Fame.

On March 12, 2022, Flack was honored with the DAR Women in American History Award and a restored fire callbox in the Capitol Hill neighborhood of Washington D.C. commemorating her early-career connection to nearby Mr. Henry's neighborhood bar.

On January 24, 2023, the PBS series American Masters opened its 37th season with an hour-long look at her career. On May 13, 2023, Flack received an honorary doctorate from Berklee College of Music.

In September 2025, Flack was selected for induction into the National Rhythm and Blues Hall of Fame and will be slated for induction on October 26.

=== Grammy Awards ===
The Grammy Awards are awarded annually by the National Academy of Recording Arts and Sciences. Flack received four awards from thirteen nominations.

| Year | Nominee / work | Award | Result |
|---|---|---|---|
| 1972 | "You've Got a Friend" (with Donny Hathaway) | Best R&B Vocal Performance by a Group | Nominated |
| 1973 | "The First Time Ever I Saw Your Face" | Record of the Year | Won |
| 1973 | "Where Is the Love" (with Donny Hathaway) | Best Pop Vocal Performance by a Duo, Group or Chorus | Won |
| 1973 | Quiet Fire | Best Pop Vocal Performance, Female | Nominated |
| 1974 | Killing Me Softly | Album of the Year | Nominated |
| 1974 | "Killing Me Softly with His Song" | Record of the Year | Won |
| 1974 | "Killing Me Softly with His Song" | Best Pop Vocal Performance, Female | Won |
| 1975 | "Feel Like Makin' Love" | Record of the Year | Nominated |
| 1975 | "Feel Like Makin' Love" | Best Pop Vocal Performance, Female | Nominated |
| 1979 | "The Closer I Get to You" (with Donny Hathaway) | Best Pop Vocal Performance by a Duo or Group | Nominated |
| 1981 | Roberta Flack Featuring Donny Hathaway | Best R&B Vocal Performance, Female | Nominated |
| 1981 | "Back Together Again" (with Donny Hathaway) | Best R&B Performance by a Duo or Group with Vocal | Nominated |
| 1995 | Roberta | Best Traditional Pop Vocal Performance | Nominated |
| 2020 | Roberta Flack | Grammy Lifetime Achievement Award | Won |

=== American Music Awards ===
The American Music Awards is an annual awards ceremony created by Dick Clark in 1973. Flack won the award for Best Soul/R&B Female Artist at the inaugural show in 1974.

| Year | Nominee / work | Award | Result |
|---|---|---|---|
| 1974 | | Favorite Female Artist (Pop/Rock) | Nominated |
| 1974 | | Favorite Female Artist (Soul/R&B) | Won |
| 1974 | "Killing Me Softly with His Song" | Favorite Single (Pop/Rock) | Nominated |
| 1975 | | Favorite Female Artist (Soul/R&B) | Nominated |
| 1975 | "Feel Like Makin' Love" | Favorite Single (Soul/R&B) | Nominated |
| 1979 | | Favorite Female Artist (Soul/R&B) | Nominated |

== Discography ==
- First Take (1969)
- Chapter Two (1970)
- Quiet Fire (1971)
- Roberta Flack & Donny Hathaway (with Donny Hathaway) (1972)
- Killing Me Softly (1973)
- Feel Like Makin' Love (1975)
- Blue Lights in the Basement (1977)
- Roberta Flack (1978)
- Roberta Flack Featuring Donny Hathaway (1980)
- I'm the One (1982)
- Born to Love (1983) (with Peabo Bryson) (1983)
- Oasis (1988)
- Set the Night to Music (1991)
- Stop the World (1992)
- Roberta (1994)
- The Christmas Album (1997)
- Let It Be Roberta (2012)

== General and cited references ==
- Bryan, Sarah; Beverly Patterson (2013). "Roberta Flack". African American Trails of Eastern North Carolina. North Carolina Arts Council. p. 92. ISBN 978-1469610795.
