= Quiet Fire (Roberta Flack album) =

Studio album by Roberta Flack
- Released: November 1971
- Studio: Atlantic, New York City; Regent Sound, New York City; Hit Factory, New York City
- Genre: Soul; gospel
- Length: 41:37
- Label: Atlantic
- Producer: Joel Dorn

Roberta Flack chronology
Chapter Two (1970)	Quiet Fire (1971)	Roberta Flack & Donny Hathaway (1972)

Singles from Quiet Fire
- 1. "Will You Still Love Me Tomorrow"/"Go Up Moses" Released: December 7, 1971

Quiet Fire is the third studio album by American singer Roberta Flack, released in November 1971 by Atlantic Records. It was recorded at Atlantic Recording Studios, Regent Studios, and The Hit Factory in New York City. The album peaked at number 18 on the US Billboard Top LPs & Tape, and its single "Will You Still Love Me Tomorrow" charted at number 76 on the Hot 100. At the 15th Annual Grammy Awards, the album secured Roberta Flack a nomination for Best Pop Vocal Performance, Female.

== Critical reception ==
Professional ratings
Review scores
Source	Rating
AllMusic	4.5/5 stars
Robert Christgau	C
The Rolling Stone Album Guide	2/5 stars

In a contemporary review for The Village Voice, Robert Christgau gave Quiet Fire a C rating, writing that Flack occasionally "sounds kind, intelligent, and very likable, but she often exhibits the gratuitous gentility you'd expect of anyone who said 'between you and I'." In a retrospective review, The Rolling Stone Album Guide (1992) gave it two out of five stars and claimed it "barely sparks at all." AllMusic's Stephen Cook was more enthusiastic, giving it four-and-a-half out of five stars and calling it "one of Flack's best." He believed its "varied mix all comes off sounding seamless." while writing: "Forgoing the full-throttled delivery of, say, Aretha Franklin, Flack translates the pathos of gospel expression into measured intensity and sighing, elongated phrases."

== Track listing ==
All tracks produced by Joel Dorn.

Quiet Fire track listing
No.	Title	Writer(s)	Length
1.	"Go up Moses"	Roberta Flack; Jesse Jackson; Joel Dorn	5:20
2.	"Bridge over Troubled Water"	Paul Simon	7:13
3.	"Sunday and Sister Jones"	Gene McDaniels	4:48
4.	"See You Then"	Jimmy Webb	3:40
5.	"Will You Still Love Me Tomorrow"	Carole King; Gerry Goffin	3:59
6.	"To Love Somebody"	Barry Gibb; Robin Gibb	6:41
7.	"Let Them Talk"	Sonny Thompson	3:50
8.	"Sweet Bitter Love"	Van McCoy	6:06
Total length:			41:37

== Personnel ==
Performers and musicians

- Roberta Flack – piano, vocals
- Joshie Armstead – background vocals
- J.R. "Jim" Bailey – background vocals
- Seymour Barab – cello
- David Carey – vibraphone
- Ron Carter – bass guitar
- The Newark Boys Chorus – background vocals
- Joel Dorn – background vocals
- Joe Farrell – flute, alto saxophone, tenor saxophone
- Corky Hale – harp
- Hilda Harris – background vocals
- Cissy Houston – background vocals
- Ted Hoyle – cello
- Wally Kane – bassoon
- Hubert Laws – flute
- Buddy Lucas – harmonica
- Ralph MacDonald – percussion, congas
- Arif Mardin – background vocals, string arrangements, flute arrangement
- Les McCann – background vocals
- Hugh McCracken – guitar
- Gene McDaniels – background vocals
- Kermit Moore – cello
- Romeo Penque – flute, soprano saxophone
- Terry Plumeri – double bass
- Seldon Powell – tenor saxophone
- Bernard Purdie – drums
- Chuck Rainey – bass guitar, electric bass
- George Ricci – cello
- William Slapin – flute
- Grady Tate – percussion, drums
- Richard Tee – organ
- Tasha Thomas – background vocals
- Sammy Turner – background vocals

Technical

- Rod Bristow – photography
- Deodato – horn arrangements, string arrangements
- Joel Dorn – producer
- William Eaton – horn arrangements, string arrangements
- Ira Friedlander – cover design
- Lewis Hahn – engineer
- Bruce Tergesen – engineer

== Charts ==
Weekly chart performance for Quiet Fire
Chart (1971)	Peak position
US Billboard 200	18
US Top Jazz Albums (Billboard)	5
US Top R&B/Hip-Hop Albums (Billboard)	4

== Certifications ==
Certifications for Quiet Fire
Region	Certification	Certified units/sales
United States (RIAA)	Gold	500,000^{^}
^{^} Shipments figures based on certification alone.
