= Joel Dorn =

American music producer (1942–2007)

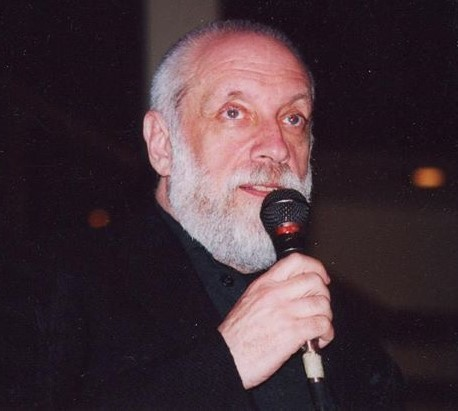
photo by Marilyn Cvitanic

Joel Dorn (April 7, 1942 – December 17, 2007) was an American jazz and R&B music producer and record label entrepreneur. He worked at Atlantic Records, and later founded the 32 Jazz, Label M, and Hyena Records labels. He called himself "The Masked Announcer".

Artists he worked with included: Roberta Flack, Max Roach, Bette Midler, The Allman Brothers Band, Peter Allen, Yusef Lateef, Willy DeVille, the Neville Brothers, Herbie Mann, Les McCann, Eddie Harris, Mose Allison, Leon Redbone, Jimmy Scott and Rahsaan Roland Kirk.

Dorn won two Grammy Awards:

- "The First Time Ever I Saw Your Face" by Roberta Flack, 1972 Record of the Year
- "Killing Me Softly with His Song" by Roberta Flack, 1973 Record of the Year

Dorn died from a heart attack in 2007. His son, Adam Dorn, is a musician working under the name Mocean Worker.
