= Peabo Bryson discography =

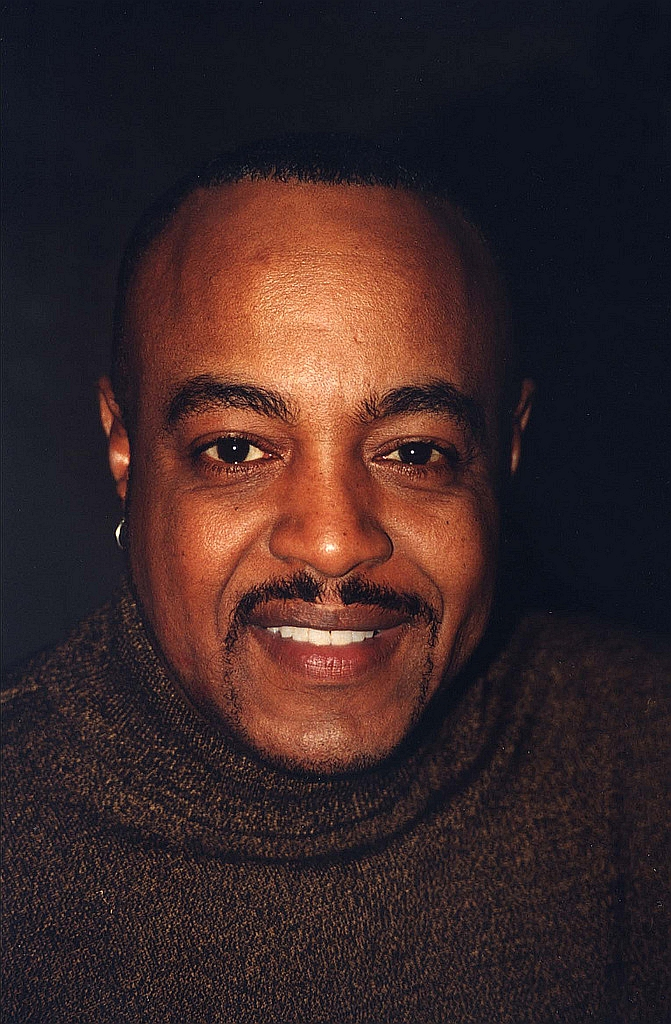
- Bryson in 2000.
- Studio albums: 21
- Compilation albums: 8
- Singles: 57
- Music videos: 10

The discography of the American soul singer Peabo Bryson consists of twenty one studio albums, eight compilation albums and fifty seven singles.

== Albums ==
=== Studio albums ===
Year	Title	Peak chart positions					Certifications	Record label
Year	Title	US	US R&B	AUS	CAN	UK	Certifications	Record label
1976	Peabo	—	48	—	—	—		Bullet
1978	Reaching for the Sky	49	11	—	65	—	US: Gold	Capitol
1978	Crosswinds	35	3	—	48	—	US: Gold	Capitol
1979	We're the Best of Friends (with Natalie Cole)	44	7	—	—	—	US: Gold	Capitol
1980	Paradise	79	13	—	—	—		Capitol
1981	Turn the Hands of Time	82	—	—	—	—		Capitol
1981	I Am Love	40	6	—	—	—		Capitol
1982	Don't Play with Fire	55	8	—	—	—		Capitol
1983	Born to Love (with Roberta Flack)	25	8	35	39	15	US: Gold; BPI: Silver	Capitol
1984	Straight from the Heart	44	12	62	87	—		Elektra
1985	Take No Prisoners	102	40	—	—	—		Elektra
1986	Quiet Storm	—	45	—	—	—		Elektra
1988	Positive	157	42	—	—	—		Elektra
1989	All My Love	—	27	—	—	—		Capitol
1991	Can You Stop the Rain	88	1	188	—	—	US: Gold	Columbia
1994	Through the Fire	—	54	193	—	—		Columbia
1997	Peace on Earth	—	—	—	—	—		Angel
1999	Unconditional Love	—	75	—	—	—		Private Music
2007	Missing You	—	41	—	—	—		Peak
2018	Stand for Love	—	—	—	—	—		Capitol
"—" denotes a recording that did not chart or was not released in that territory.

=== Live albums ===
Year	Title	Peak chart positions		Record label
Year	Title	US	US R&B	Record label
1980	Live & More (with Roberta Flack)	52	10	Atlantic

=== Compilation albums ===
Year	Title	Peak chart positions		Record label
Year	Title	US	US R&B	Record label
1984	Collection	168	55	Capitol
1997	I'm So into You: The Passion of Peabo Bryson	—	—	Capitol
2000	Super Hits	—	—	Columbia
2001	Anthology	—	—	Capitol
2002	Beauty and the Beast: The Duets +	—	—	Columbia
2004	The Best of Peabo Bryson	—	—	Columbia
2006	The Very Best of Peabo Bryson	—	46	Time–Life
2013	Ballads	—	—	Capitol
"—" denotes a recording that did not chart or was not released in that territory.

== Singles ==
Year	Title	Peak chart positions						Certifications	Album
Year	Title	US	US R&B	US AC	AUS	CAN	UK	Certifications	Album
1975	"Disco Queen"	—	—	—	—	—	—		Non-album single
1975	"Do It with Feeling" (with The Michael Zager Band)	94	25	—	—	—	—		Non-album single
1976	"Underground Music"	—	22	—	—	—	—		Peabo
1976	"It's Just a Matter of Time"	—	22	—	—	—	—		Peabo
1977	"Just Another Day"	—	27	—	—	—	—		Peabo
1977	"I Can Make It Better"	—	23	—	—	—	—		Peabo
1978	"Reaching for the Sky"	102	6	—	—	67	—		Reaching for the Sky
1978	"Feel the Fire"	—	13	—	—	—	—		Reaching for the Sky
1978	"Do It with Feeling" (with The Michael Zager Band) (re-release)	—	76	—	—	—	—		Non-album single
1978	"I'm So into You"	109	2	—	—	—	—		Crosswinds
1979	"Crosswinds"	—	28	—	—	—	—		Crosswinds
1979	"She's a Woman"	—	44	—	—	—	—		Crosswinds
1979	"Gimme Some Time" (with Natalie Cole)	102	8	—	—	—	—		We're the Best of Friends
1980	"What You Won't Do for Love" (with Natalie Cole)	—	16	—	—	—	—		We're the Best of Friends
1980	"Minute by Minute"	—	12	—	—	—	—		Paradise
1980	"I Love the Way You Love"	—	39	—	—	—	—		Paradise
1980	"Here We Go" (with Minnie Riperton)	—	14	—	—	—	—		Love Lives Forever
1980	"Make the World Stand Still" (with Roberta Flack)	—	13	—	—	—	—		Live & More
1981	"Lovers After All" (with Melissa Manchester)	54	34	25	—	—	—		For the Working Girl
1981	"Love Is a Waiting Game" (with Roberta Flack)	—	46	—	—	—	—		Live & More
1981	"Turn the Hands of Time"	—	61	—	—	—	—		Turn the Hands of Time
1981	"Let the Feeling Flow"	42	6	—	—	—	—		I Am Love
1982	"There's No Guarantee"	—	36	—	—	—	—		I Am Love
1982	"Give Me Your Love"	—	22	—	—	—	—		Don't Play with Fire
1982	"We Don't Have to Talk (About Love)"	—	16	—	—	—	—		Don't Play with Fire
1983	"Remember When (So Much Love)"	—	54	—	—	—	—		Don't Play with Fire
1983	"Tonight, I Celebrate My Love" (with Roberta Flack)	16	5	4	10	4	2	BPI: Silver	Born to Love
1983	"Heaven Above Me" (with Roberta Flack)	—	—	—	—	—	84		Born to Love
1983	"Maybe" (with Roberta Flack)	—	68	—	—	—	—		Born to Love
1983	"You're Lookin' Like Love to Me" (with Roberta Flack)	58	41	5	—	—	—		Born to Love
1984	"D.C. Cab"	—	53	—	—	—	—		D.C. Cab: Music from the Original Motion Picture Soundtrack
1984	"I Just Came Here to Dance" (with Roberta Flack)	—	—	15	—	—	—		Born to Love
1984	"If Ever You're in My Arms Again"	10	6	1	20	6	—		Straight from the Heart
1984	"Slow Dancin'"	82	35	—	—	—	—		Straight from the Heart
1985	"Take No Prisoners (In the Game of Love)"	78	39	37	—	84	—		Take No Prisoners
1985	"There's Nothin' Out There"	—	36	—	—	—	—		Take No Prisoners
1985	"Love Always Finds a Way"	—	63	26	—	—	—		Take No Prisoners
1986	"Good Combination"	—	44	—	—	—	—		Quiet Storm
1987	"Catch 22"	—	92	—	—	—	—		Quiet Storm
1987	"Without You" (with Regina Belle)	89	14	8	—	—	85		Positive
1989	"Show & Tell"	—	1	—	—	—	—		All My Love
1989	"All My Love"	—	6	—	—	—	—		All My Love
1990	"Lover's Paradise"	—	98	—	—	—	—		All My Love
1991	"Can You Stop the Rain"	52	1	11	—	—	—		Can You Stop the Rain
1991	"Closer Than Close"	—	10	—	—	—	—		Can You Stop the Rain
1991	"Beauty and the Beast" (with Celine Dion)	9	—	3	17	23	9	BPI: Silver	Beauty and the Beast
1992	"Lost in the Night"	—	43	45	—	—	—		Can You Stop the Rain
1992	"Shower You with Love"	—	47	—	—	—	—		Can You Stop the Rain
1992	"You Are My Home" (with Linda Eder)	—	—	34	—	—	—		The Scarlet Pimpernel
1992	"A Whole New World" (with Regina Belle)	1	21	1	10	6	12		Aladdin
1993	"By the Time This Night Is Over" (with Kenny G)	25	37	1	—	6	56		Breathless
1994	"Why Goodbye"	—	107	—	—	—	—		Through the Fire
1995	"How Wonderful We Are" (with Lea Salonga)	—	—	—	—	—	—		People
1999	"Did You Ever Know"	—	101	—	—	—	—		Unconditional Love
2007	"Missing You"	—	122	—	—	—	—		Missing You
2014	"Here For You"	—	—	—	—	—	—		
2018	"Love Like Yours and Mine"	—	—	—	—	—	—		Stand for Love
2018	"All She Wants to Do Is Me"	—	—	—	—	—	—		Stand for Love
"—" denotes a recording that did not chart or was not released in that territory.

=== Other charted songs ===
List of other charted songs, showing year released, chart positions and album name
Title	Year	Peak chart position	Album
Title	Year	JAM Air.	Album
"My Heart Belongs To You"	1999	4	Unconditional Love

== Music videos ==
Year	Video	Director
1982	"Remember When (So Much Love)"	
1985	"Take No Prisoners (In the Game of Love)"	
1988	"Show and Tell"	
1991	"Can You Stop the Rain"	Rocky Schenck
1991	"Beauty and the Beast" (with Celine Dion)	Dominic Orlando
1991	"Lost in the Night"	
1992	"A Whole New World" (with Regina Belle)	
1993	"By the Time This Night Is Over" (with Kenny G)	Bud Schaetzle
1995	"How Wonderful We Are" (with Lea Salonga)	
