= Bustin' Loose (film) =

1981 film by Oz Scott & Michael Schultz

- Theatrical release poster for Bustin' Loose.
- Directed by: Oz Scott; Michael Schultz (uncredited)
- Written by: Lonne Elder III
- Screenplay by: Roger L. Simon
- Story by: Richard Pryor
- Produced by: Michael S. Glick; Richard Pryor
- Starring: Richard Pryor; Cicely Tyson; Robert Christian; George Coe
- Music by: Mark Davis; Roberta Flack
- Production companies: Omar Productions; Northwest Film and Television Consultants; Universal Clearances
- Distributed by: Universal Pictures
- Release date: May 22, 1981
- Running time: 94 minutes
- Country: United States
- Language: English
- Budget: $11 million
- Box office: $31.3 million

Bustin' Loose is a 1981 American road comedy-drama film starring Richard Pryor and Cicely Tyson. It was directed by Oz Scott and Michael Schultz (uncredited) and written by Pryor (story), Lonne Elder III (adaptation), and Roger L. Simon (screenplay). Along with starring Pryor and Tyson, the film also features Robert Christian and George Coe. Bustin' Loose was produced by Michael S. Glick and Pryor.

== Plot ==
Joe Braxton is a convict who violates his parole after a failed attempt to lift a bunch of televisions from a store in Philadelphia. After a dramatic attempt at reverse psychology with the judge, he is given a second chance at parole, and his parole-officer, Donald, has him do something for him.

Donald is also involved with school teacher Vivian Perry, whose school was just closed down by the city due to budget cuts. While most of the children have been relocated, eight students in special education have yet to be relocated. Vivian decides to take them to her aunt's farm in rural Washington. Donald is against it, and at first gets Joe to tell her the old bus she planned on using would not work. However, that blows up in his face, but Donald then decides to have Joe go ahead and drive the bus to Washington.

As Joe, Vivian and the kids ride the bus, the past lives and ailments of the kids are told:

- Harold is blind, but so badly wants to drive a vehicle, and eventually does.
- Anthony is a pyromaniac who accidentally burned his house down and killed his parents, whom he could not wake up.
- Annie is a former Vietnamese child prostitute that has a knack for art.

Joe thinks he is there to fix and drive the bus, but he finds out his true knack is helping out the kids, especially shown when he scolds and counsels Annie after she tries to sleep with him and saves Anthony from setting another person's property on fire, eventually taking the kids fishing for their first time.

After fixing the bus in the rain on a dirt road, Joe and Vivian have trouble getting it out of the mud. When Joe leaves to get help, he is found walking in lock step with a group of Klansmen, who follow him back to the bus. Joe then manages to talk the head Klansman and the rest into getting the bus out to get the kids to a hospital in Washington, suddenly claiming they are all blind. They agree sympathetically and push them out of the mud.

Somewhere in Montana, Donald catches up with them at a motel, after finding out Vivian lied to him and falsified the kids records. After trying to flee in the middle of the night, Donald catches up with them and demands they return to Philadelphia, which the kids, Vivian, and Joe all resist.

After arriving at the farm, Vivian meets with a banker in order to secure a $15,000 loan to save the farm. One of the other kids overhears them and tells the rest of the kids this. Joe then confronts the kids, who are whining and protesting about their fate. Joe learns about this as well and heads into town where he sees an ad for a "trapezoid scheme" and goes in to learn about it, dressed as a cowboy from Texarkana. Eventually, he works his way into sitting with the group and schemes to rip them off. He does and gets Vivian her $15,000 then leaves with her, while two men from the group pursue them. After evading them and burning the money, they go back to the farm and have an argument about the money.

They realize the old Rolls-Royce from the bank is there, and they find out the kids told the president of the bank (who is also the mayor of the town) lies about what good things Joe and Vivian did, and convinced the mayor to give the loan and make the kids a part of the community. After they celebrate, Donald shows up with a police officer demanding they all return to Philadelphia but has a confrontation with the mayor that he ends up losing. In the end, it seems that Joe is going to go back to Philly with Donald, but Donald gets to the end of the driveway, and changes his mind and lets Joe stay.

== Cast ==
- Richard Pryor as Joe Braxton
- Cicely Tyson as Vivian Perry
- Robert Christian as Donald Kinsey
- George Coe as Dr. Wilson T. Renfrew
- Earl Billings as man at Parole Office
- Bill Quinn as Judge Antonio Runzuli
- Fred Carney as Alfred Schuyler
- Peggy McCay as Gloria Schuyler
- Roy Jenson as Klan Leader
- Alphonso Alexander as Martin
- Kia Cooper as Samantha
- Edwin de Leon as Ernesto
- Jimmy Hughes as Harold
- Edwin Kinter as Anthony
- Tami Luchow as Linda
- Angel Ramirez as Julio
- Janet Wong as Annie
- Nick Dimitri as Frank Munjak
- Morgan Roberts as Uncle Humphrey
- Inez Pedroza as herself
- Gary Goetzman as Store Manager
- Paul Mooney as Marvin
- Paul Gardner as Anchorman
- Ben Gerard as Man
- Vern Taylor as Highway Patrolman #1

== Production ==
Bustin' Loose was filmed in part in various towns in Washington state, including Carnation, Ellensburg, and Snohomish.

== Music ==
Although the film's score was composed by Mark Davis, Roberta Flack also contributed new original music to the film and released a soundtrack for the film on June 5, 1981. Luther Vandross and Peabo Bryson contributed vocals to the album and Vandross wrote the song, "You Stopped Loving Me", which he later performed himself on his debut album Never Too Much.

=== Soundtrack ===
Bustin' Loose

Soundtrack album by Roberta Flack
- Released: June 5, 1981
- Recorded: 1981
- Genre: R&B, soul
- Label: MCA
- Producer: Buster Williams; Roberta Flack

Roberta Flack chronology
The Best of Roberta Flack (1981)	Bustin' Loose (1981)	I'm the One (1982)

Singles from I'm the One
- 1. "You Stopped Loving Me / Qual E Malindrinho (Why Are You So Bad)" Released: June 20, 1981; 2. "Lovin' You (Is Such an Easy Thang to Do)/ Hittin' Me Where It Hurts" Released: September 19, 1981

Bustin' Loose is a soundtrack album released by Roberta Flack in 1981. It was recorded for the movie of the same title starring Richard Pryor. Luther Vandross and Peabo Bryson contributed vocals to the album and Vandross wrote the song, "You Stopped Loving Me", which he later performed himself on his debut album Never Too Much.

==== Track listing ====
No.	Title	Writer(s)	Length
1.	""Lovin' You (Is Such an Easy Thang to Do)""	Roberta Flack	5:57
2.	"Rollin' On"	Roberta Flack; Buddy Williams	4:17
3.	""You Stopped Loving Me""	Luther Vandross	4:32
4.	""Just When I Needed You""	Roberta Flack; Eric Mercury	4:48
5.	""Qual E Malindrinho (Why Are You So Bad)""	Roberta Flack; Dwight Watkins	4:47
6.	""Love Always Commands""	Roberta Flack; Eric Mercury	6:27
7.	""Children Song""	Roberta Flack; Barry Miles; Dwight Watkins	4:40
8.	""Ballad for D.""	Peabo Bryson; Roberta Flack; Buddy Williams	3:35
9.	""Hittin' Me Where It Hurts""	William D. Smith; Kathy Wakefield	3:43

==== Personnel ====
- Roberta Flack - vocals, piano
- Peabo Bryson - backing vocals
- Barry Miles - keyboards, arrangements
- Marcus Miller - bass
- Dom Um Romão - percussion
- Luther Vandross - backing vocals
- Georg Wadenius - guitar
- Buddy Williams - drums

== Reception ==
Bustin' Loose opened number one at the box office in 828 theaters domestically. It grossed $6,622,753 in its opening weekend. Its run ended with $31,261,269 in the box office, domestically.

=== Critical response ===
Vincent Canby of The New York Times wrote in his review: "Only the incomparable Richard Pryor could make a comedy as determinedly, aggressively sentimental as Bustin' Loose, which is about eight needy orphans and a $15,000 mortgage that's due, and still get an R-rating. Vulgar language is the reason, but because vulgar language is a basic part of the Pryor comedy method, one longs for his every assault on genteelism in Bustin' Loose, a film that would otherwise be painful." TV Guide gives Bustin' Loose 4 stars out of 5 stars.

== Release ==
Bustin' Loose was released in theaters on May 22, 1981. The film was released on DVD on May 1, 2001, and again on January 11, 2005.

== See also ==
- Bustin' Loose (TV series)
