= Tonight, I Celebrate My Love =

Single by Peabo Bryson and Roberta Flack

from the album Born to Love
- B-side: "Born to Love"
- Released: June 24, 1983
- Recorded: 1982
- Studio: A&M (Hollywood, California)
- Genre: R&B; soul; soft rock
- Length: 3:30
- Label: Capitol
- Songwriters: Gerry Goffin; Michael Masser
- Producer: Michael Masser

Peabo Bryson singles chronology
"Remember When (So Much Love)" (1983)	"Tonight, I Celebrate My Love" (1983)	"Heaven Above Me" (1983)

Roberta Flack singles chronology
"Remember When (So Much Love)" (1983)	"Tonight, I Celebrate My Love" (1983)	"Maybe" (1983)

"Tonight, I Celebrate My Love" is a romantic ballad written by lyricist Gerry Goffin with Michael Masser and recorded by Peabo Bryson and Roberta Flack for their 1983 album of duets, Born to Love, issued as the lead single. The track—produced by Masser—became a million-selling international hit.

== Overview ==
"Tonight, I Celebrate My Love" was one of two Michael Masser/Gerry Goffin co-writes produced by Masser for the Born to Love album. Although the Born to Love sessions marked the first time either Peabo Bryson or Roberta Flack had been produced by Masser, Flack had previously recorded two Masser/Goffin co-writes: "Independent Man" (1978 album Roberta Flack) and "Stay With Me" (1980 album Roberta Flack Featuring Donny Hathaway): also Masser's Ron Miller co-write "After You" was featured on Flack's 1977 album Blue Lights in the Basement. Flack's first recording of a Gerry Goffin composition had been a remake of his earliest evocation of nocturnal intimacy, Flack's version of the Shirelles' classic—co-written with Carole King—"Will You Still Love Me Tomorrow"—featured on the 1971 album Quiet Fire—in fact becoming Flack's first solo single to appear on the Hot 100 in Billboard magazine also serving as Flack's solo debut on Billboard's R&B chart (Flack had previously reached both the Hot 100 and R&B charts with two duet singles with Donny Hathaway).

Despite Flack having recorded three of Masser's compositions, the singer would recall that when Masser previewed "Tonight, I Celebrate My Love" for her, it was with the advisement that he hoped to place the song, rejected by RCA for Diana Ross, with Barbra Streisand:(Roberta Flack quote:)"[But] I told him I think I can sing that." Flack brought Bryson over to Masser's house for the composer to preview "Tonight, I Celebrate..." for Bryson who would recall (Peabo Bryson quote:) "Even though it's a great song, I [then] didn't [appreciate] it was" since "Michael's not the greatest singer in the world...I only [agreed] to do it because Roberta really wanted to[, but] after the first take in the studio I got [the song's appeal] too." The second Masser/Goffin co-write on Born to Love: "Comin' Alive", described by Masser as "an uptempo synthesized song", was considered by Masser for single release rather than "Tonight, I Celebrate...": (Michael Masser quote:) "but I just felt that there are people out there who want to be touched by a romantic acoustic ballad...Each year, through whatever else is the particular fashion or mode, there are always great ballads that break through."

Bryson and Flack had previously appeared on the R&B chart in Billboard with two duet singles: "Make the World Stand Still" and "Love is a Waiting Game", both from their collaborative 1980 Live & More double album. However, "Tonight, I Celebrate My Love" would be the first Bryson/Flack duet single to rank on the Billboard Hot 100: with a Hot 100 peak of #16 in November 1983: "Tonight, I Celebrate..." would also rank on the Billboard R&B chart (#5) and on the magazine's Adult Contemporary chart (#4). In the UK, "Tonight, I Celebrate..." would peak at #2 in September 1983, affording both Bryson and Flack their alltime best UK chart showing. "Tonight, I Celebrate..." was afforded further international success charting in Australia (#10), Canada (#4), Finland (#13), Flemish Belgium (#8), Ireland (#5), the Netherlands (#16), New Zealand (#11), Norway (#8), and South Africa (#4).

A promotional video—Flack's video debut—was prepped for "Tonight, I Celebrate My Love". Directed by Martin Pitts, the video was a straightforward performance video showing Flack and Bryson singing the song—she playing the piano and he seated on a stool at her side—while session musicians may be seen in the background: the clip was filmed at Capitol Studios in Hollywood, the Born to Love album being recorded for Capitol Records—Bryson's home label—with Flack on loan from Atlantic Records (the track "Tonight, I Celebrate ... " was in fact recorded at A&M Studios with Randy Kerber on piano: Flack did not play piano on any tracks on Born to Love).

"Tonight, I Celebrate My Love" would be the only top 40 hit duet for Peabo Bryson and Roberta Flack as the only subsequent single from Born to Love to chart on the Hot 100: "You're Looking Like Love to Me", peaked at #58. "Tonight, I Celebrate ... " would also be the only major hit duet for Bryson and Flack in the UK where "Heaven Above Me" was issued as the follow-up single to chart no higher than #84. Bryson's only solo hit single after "Tonight, I Celebrate..." would be the Michael Masser co-write "If Ever You're in My Arms Again" which peaked at #10, his only solo top 40 hit. Bryson would however score two more top 10 hit duets in 1991 and 1992, with "Beauty and the Beast" and "A Whole New World" respectively; the latter a number one on the Billboard Hot 100.

== Personnel ==
- Roberta Flack – vocals
- Peabo Bryson – vocals
- Randy Kerber – keyboards
- Paul Jackson Jr. – guitar
- Nathan East – bass
- Carlos Vega – drums
- Michael Masser – rhythm arrangements
- Gene Page – orchestration, rhythm arrangements

== Critical reception ==
The Telegraph listed the song as one of the "50 best love songs of the 1980s", writing "Mmm! Dig those tinkly Eighties keyboards. Almost tasteful, considering its schlockbusting potential." The song is, according to The Telegraph, Roberta Flack's favourite song from her 1980s repertoire. The Monthly describes it as a "big romantic ballad."

== Charts ==
=== Weekly charts ===
Chart (1983)	Peak position
Australia (Kent Music Report)	10
Belgium (Ultratop 50 Flanders)	8
Canada Top Singles (RPM)	4
Ireland (IRMA)	5
Netherlands (Dutch Top 40)	6
Netherlands (Single Top 100)	16
New Zealand (Recorded Music NZ)	11
Norway (VG-lista)	8
South Africa (Springbok)	4
UK Singles (Official Charts)	2
Uruguay (AP)	3
US Billboard Hot 100	16
US Adult Contemporary (Billboard)	4
US Hot R&B/Hip-Hop Songs (Billboard)	5

Chart (2025)	Peak position
US R&B Digital Song Sales (Billboard)	7

=== Year-end charts ===
Chart (1983)	Position
Australia (Kent Music Report)	70
Netherlands (Dutch Top 40)	79
US Billboard Hot 100	96
US Hot R&B/Hip-Hop Songs (Billboard)	30

== In popular culture ==
During the 1980s, the song was the love theme for Days of Our Lives supercouple, Bo Brady and Hope Williams.

In 2005, it was used in a commercial for the M-Azing candy bar.
