= The Best of Roberta Flack =

Greatest hits album by Roberta Flack
- Released: 1981
- Genre: R&B, soul
- Label: Atlantic

Roberta Flack chronology
Live & More (1980)	The Best of Roberta Flack (1981)	Bustin' Loose (1981)

Professional ratings
Review scores
Source	Rating
AllMusic	4.5/5 stars
Christgau's Record Guide: The '80s	C

The Best of Roberta Flack is Roberta Flack's first compilation album, released in 1981.

== Track listing ==
1. "Killing Me Softly with His Song" - (Charles Fox, Norman Gimbel) (4.13)
2. "The Closer I Get to You" - (Reggie Lucas, James Mtume) (4.39)
  - performed by Roberta Flack & Donny Hathaway
3. "You've Got a Friend" - (Carole King) (3.20)
  - performed by Roberta Flack & Donny Hathaway
4. "Feel Like Makin' Love" - (Eugene McDaniels) (2.55)
5. "Will You Still Love Me Tomorrow" - (Gerry Goffin, Carole King) (3.59)
6. "Where Is the Love" - (William Slater, Ralph MacDonald) (2.43)
  - performed by Roberta Flack & Donny Hathaway
7. "The First Time Ever I Saw Your Face" - (Ewan MacColl) (4.15)
8. "Back Together Again" - (Reggie Lucas, James Mtume) (4.49)
  - performed by Roberta Flack & Donny Hathaway
9. "You Are My Heaven" - (Stevie Wonder, Eric Mercury) (4.10)
  - performed by Roberta Flack & Donny Hathaway
10. "If Ever I See You Again" - (Joe Brooks) (3.34)
11. "Jesse" - (Janis Ian) (4.00)

== Charts ==
Chart (1981)	Peak position
New Zealand Albums (RMNZ)	21

== Certifications ==
Region	Certification	Certified units/sales
Australia (ARIA)	2× Platinum	140,000^{^}
Hong Kong (IFPI Hong Kong)	Gold	10,000^{*}
United States (RIAA)	Platinum	1,000,000^{^}
^{*} Sales figures based on certification alone.^{^} Shipments figures based on certification alone.
