= Born to Love (Peabo Bryson and Roberta Flack album) =

Studio album by Peabo Bryson and Roberta Flack
- Released: July 22, 1983
- Studio: Record Plant (New York City, New York); A&M Studios and Music Grinder Studios (Hollywood, California); Studio Sound Recorders (North Hollywood, California); Motown/Hitsville U.S.A. Recording Studios, Westlake Studios and New Sound Labs (Los Angeles, California)
- Genre: Funk; Soul
- Length: 36:13
- Label: Capitol
- Producer: Michael Masser (1, 7); Burt Bacharach Carole Bayer Sager (2, 5); Bob Crewe Bob Gaudio (3, 6, 8); Peabo Bryson (4); Roberta Flack (9)

Roberta Flack chronology
I'm the One (1982)	Born to Love (1983)	Greatest Hits (1984)

Peabo Bryson chronology
Don't Play with Fire (1982)	Born to Love (1983)	Straight from the Heart (1984)

Singles from Born to Love
- 1. "Tonight I Celebrate My Love / Born to Love" Released: June 24, 1983; 2. "You're Looking Like Love to Me / Let Me Be the One You Need" Released: September 12, 1983

Born to Love is a 1983 studio album of duets by American singers Peabo Bryson and Roberta Flack. It was released by Bryson's label Capitol Records on July 22, 1983, in the United States. The album yielded the hit single "Tonight, I Celebrate My Love", written by Gerry Goffin and Michael Masser. The track "Maybe" was written and recorded for the film Romantic Comedy (1983).

== Critical reception ==
Professional ratings
Review scores
Source	Rating
AllMusic	3/5 stars
Smash Hits	4/10

AllMusic editor Rob Theakston called Born to Love "not an essential album by any means, but nonetheless an enjoyable listen."

== Track listing ==
Side A
No.	Title	Writer(s)	Producer(s)	Length
1.	"Tonight, I Celebrate My Love"	Gerry Goffin; Michael Masser	Masser	3:29
2.	"Blame It on Me"	Burt Bacharach; Carole Bayer Sager	Bacharach; Bayer Sager	4:12
3.	"Heaven Above Me"	Bob Gaudio; Bob Crewe	Gaudio; Crewe	4:34
4.	"Born to Love"	Bryson	Bryson	4:25

Side B
No.	Title	Writer(s)	Producer(s)	Length
5.	"Maybe"	Bacharach; Bayer Sager; Marvin Hamlisch	Bacharach; Bayer Sager	3:19
6.	"I Just Came Here to Dance"	Kenneth Bell; Terry Skinner; J.L. Wallace	Gaudio; Crewe	3:59
7.	"Comin' Alive"	Goffin; Masser	Masser	3:34
8.	"You're Lookin' Like Love to Me"	Crewe; Gaudio; Jerry Corbetta	Gaudio; Crewe	3:59
9.	"Can We Find Love Again"	Roberta Flack; Al Johnson	Flack; Johnson (ass.)	4:29

== Personnel ==
Musicians

- Roberta Flack – lead vocals, backing vocals (9)
- Peabo Bryson – lead vocals, backing vocals (4)
- Randy Kerber – Fender Rhodes electric piano (1), acoustic piano (1)
- Michael Boddicker – synthesizers (2, 5)
- Greg Phillinganes – keyboards (2, 5)
- Paul Delph – Prophet-10 programming (3), Prophet-10 (6)
- Bob Gaudio – acoustic piano (3), Fender Rhodes electric piano (3), Prophet-10 (3), programming (3), LinnDrum (3), arrangements (3, 6, 8), vocal arrangements (3, 6, 8), synthesizers (6, 8)
- Mark Parrish – Oberheim OB-X (4), Prophet-5 (4)
- Vance Taylor – Fender Rhodes electric piano (4), Oberheim OB-X (4), Synclavier (4)
- Jai Winding – Fender Rhodes electric piano (6), arrangements (6, 8)
- Robbie Buchanan – keyboards (7), synthesizers (7), strings (7), arrangements (7)
- Jerry Corbetta – Fender Rhodes electric piano (8), Prophet-10 (8), synthesizer solo (8), arrangements (8)
- Richard Tee – Fender Rhodes electric piano (9)
- Marcus Miller – synthesizers (9), bass guitar (9)
- Paul Jackson Jr. – guitars (1, 2, 5)
- Dann Huff – guitars (2, 5)
- John Hauser – guitars (4)
- Georg Wadenius – guitars (9)
- Richard Horton – guitars (4), guitar synthesizer (4)
- Tim May – guitars (6), acoustic guitar (8), electric guitar (8)
- Nathan East – bass guitar (1, 7)
- Abraham Laboriel – bass guitar (2, 5)
- Leland Sklar – bass guitar (6, 8)
- Carlos Vega – drums (1, 6–8)
- Jim Keltner – drums (2, 5)
- Andre Robinson – drums (4)
- John Gilston – Simmons drums (3)
- Paulinho da Costa – percussion (2, 5)
- Charles Bryson – percussion (4)
- Anthony MacDonald – percussion (9)
- Bobbye Hall – bongos (8), congas (8)
- Pete Christlieb – saxophone solo (3, 6)
- Ron Dover – tenor saxophone (4), backing vocals (4)
- Daniel Dillard – trumpet (4)
- Thaddeus Johnson – trumpet (4), flugelhorn (4)
- Felipe Mantine – flute (9)
- Michael Masser – rhythm arrangements (1)
- Gene Page – rhythm arrangements (1), orchestration (1), strings (7)
- Frank DeCaro – music contractor (2, 5)
- Mary Bridges – backing vocals (3)
- Jim Gilstrap – backing vocals (3)
- Patricia Hall – backing vocals (3)
- Luther Waters – backing vocals (3)
- Oren Waters – backing vocals (3)
- Mona Lisa Young – backing vocals (3, 6, 8)
- Terry Young – backing vocals (3, 6, 8)
- Myra Walker – backing vocals (4)
- Dwight W. Watkins – backing vocals (4)
- Shirley Brewer – backing vocals (6, 8)
- Al Johnson – backing vocals (9), arrangements (9)

Production

- Don Grierson – executive producer
- Varnell Johnson – executive producer
- Michael Masser – producer (1, 7)
- Burt Bacharach – producer (2, 5)
- Carole Bayer Sager – producer (2, 5)
- Bob Crewe – producer (3, 6, 8)
- Bob Gaudio – producer (3, 6, 8)
- Peabo Bryson – producer (4)
- Ed Seay – assistant producer (4), engineer (4)
- Roberta Flack – producer (9)
- Al Johnson – associate producer (9)
- Jeremy Smith – engineer (1, 7)
- Howard Wolin – engineer (1, 7)
- Bruce Swedien – engineer (2, 5)
- Tony D'Amico – engineer (3, 6, 8), recording (3, 6, 8), mixing (8)
- Jay Messina – vocal recording (3, 6, 8)
- Tom Swift – vocal recording assistant (3, 6, 8)
- Eric Calvi – first engineer (9)
- Kendall Brown – second engineer (9)
- Steve Marcantonio – recording (9)
- Dick Bogart – mixing (1, 7)
- Russ Terrano – mixing (1, 7)
- Lee DeCarlo – mixing (3, 6)
- Jim Bell – mix assistant (3, 6, 8), assistant engineer (8), recording assistant (8)
- Roy Kohara – art direction
- John O'Brien – design
- Beverly Parker – photography
- Lamarries Moses – stylist
- Roger St. Pierre – liner notes

== Charts ==
Chart (1983)	Peak position
Dutch Albums (Album Top 100)	21
New Zealand Albums (RMNZ)	43
Swedish Albums (Sverigetopplistan)	50
UK Albums (OCC)	15
US Billboard 200	25
US Top R&B/Hip-Hop Albums (Billboard)	8

== Certifications ==
Region	Certification	Certified units/sales
United States (RIAA)	Gold	500,000^{^}
^{^} Shipments figures based on certification alone.
