= Stand for Love =

Studio album by Peabo Bryson
- Released: August 3, 2018
- Studio: Flyte Tyme Studios (Agoura Hills, California); Jackson's Lyric Studios (Birmingham, Alabama); Silent Sound Studios and Patchwerk Recording Studios (Atlanta, Georgia); MixStar Studios (Virginia Beach, Virginia); Soho Sound Kitchen (London, UK); China Agriculture Film and Television Studio (Beijing, China)
- Genre: R&B
- Length: 40:09
- Label: Perspective
- Producer: Jimmy Jam & Terry Lewis; John Jackson

Peabo Bryson chronology
Missing You (2007)	Stand for Love (2018)	Grace (2026)

Stand for Love is the twenty-first and final studio album by American singer Peabo Bryson. It was released on August 3, 2018, by Perspective Records, with distribution overseen by Caroline, the independent services wing of Capitol Records, his former label. Bryson's first album in a decade, it marked his debut with Perspective, the label by production duo Jimmy Jam and Terry Lewis with whom he worked on the entire album. Stand for Love was preceded by its lead single, "Love Like Yours and Mine" which reached number three on the US Adult R&B Songs chart.

== Critical reception ==
J. Matthew Cobb from HiFi Magazine found that on Stand for Love "Bryson returns to the table and is completely updated on the contemporary R&B age we’re in, not sounding dated or ferociously young. He's somewhere smacked in the middle, crooning over 30-and-up soul and seductive urban beats [...] Some of the tracks feel a bit safe, as if it’s trying to chase after the overrated Charlie Wilson adult-R&B blueprint. But Bryson delivers the songs with such fervor and without any sign of vocal diminishing throughout the course.

== Track listing ==
All songs written by James Harris III, Terry Lewis, John Jackson, and Peabo Bryson, except where noted. All songs produced by Jimmy Jam & Terry Lewis and John Jackson, except where noted.

No.	Title	Writer(s)	Producer(s)	Length
1.	"All She Wants to Do Is Me"			4:58
2.	"Love Like Yours and Mine"			3:40
3.	"Looking for Sade"			4:44
4.	"Stand for Love"	Harris; Lewis; Linda Creed; Thom Bell	Jimmy Jam & Terry Lewis	4:10
5.	"Goosebumps (Never Lie)" (featuring Gary Clark, Jr.)			3:29
6.	"Exotic"	Harris; Lewis; Jackson; Morry Sterns; Bryson; Shion Kanata		4:12
7.	"Here for You"	Harris; Lewis; Jackson; Sterns; Bryson; Kanata		4:15
8.	"Smile"	Harris; Lewis; Sterns; Bryson; Kanata		4:57
9.	"Peabo's Classic Melodies Live from Los Angeles 2018" (featuring Chanté Moore)	Bryson; Gerry Goffin; Michael Masser		5:23

Bonus tracks
No.	Title	Length
10.	"Possible (Still the One)"	3:25
11.	"Sadness"	4:37

Sample credits

- "Stand for Love" contains a sample of "Help Me Find A Way (To Say I Love You)" by Little Anthony and the Imperials.

== Personnel and credits ==
Musicians

- Peabo Bryson – lead vocals, backing vocals (1, 8)
- John Jackson – keyboards (1, 5), bass (1, 5), drum programming (1), instruments (2, 6–9), backing vocals (2), all other instruments (3), arrangements (7, 9)
- Jimmy Jam – instruments (4), additional drum programming (6)
- Terry Lewis – instruments (4)
- Eric DuBose – guitars (1, 5)
- Gary Clark Jr. – guitars (5)
- David Crenshaw – percussion (1, 3, 5)
- Masaru Nishiyama – orchestra arrangements and conductor (6, 8)
- Huang Lijie – concertmaster (6, 8)
- Asian Philharmonic Orchestra – orchestra (6, 8)
- Lauren Evans – backing vocals (1, 3–9)
- Leon Thomas III – backing vocals (4)
- Chanté Moore – lead vocals (9)

Production

- Jimmy Jam – executive producer, recording (4)
- Terry Lewis – executive producer, recording
- Satoshi Tanaka – executive producer
- Michael T. Martin – co-producer
- John Jackson – recording (1–3, 6–9)
- Thom Kidd – recording (1, 5, 6, 9)
- Nick Bassani – recording (4)
- Christian Plata – mixing (1–3, 5–9)
- Goetz Botzenhardt – mixing (1, 7, 8)
- Serban Ghenea – mixing (4)
- Matt Marrin – mixing (6, 9)
- Gene Grimaldi – mastering at Oasis Mastering (Burbank, California)
- Jason Clark – package design
- Marselle Washington – photography
- Marco Imagery – photography
- David M. Franklin & Associates – management

== Charts ==
Chart (2018)	Peak position
US Current Album Sales (Billboard)	38
US Independent Albums (Billboard)	7
