= Missing You (Peabo Bryson album) =

Studio album by Peabo Bryson
- Released: October 2, 2007
- Studio: East Bay Studios (Tarrytown, New York); Legacy Recording Studios (New York City, New York); Five Walls Recording Studios (Pelham, New York); Doppler Studios, Orphan Studios and Patchwerks (Atlanta, Georgia); Heavyweight Studios (Burbank, California); Ahhsum Studios (West Covina, California); Westlake Studios (Los Angeles, California); The It Factory (Hollywood, California); Face Productions (Las Vegas, Nevada)
- Length: 50:55
- Label: Peak
- Producer: Peabo Bryson; Norman Connors; Barry Eastmond; The Heavyweights; Duke Jones; Peter Stengaard; Regina Troupe

Peabo Bryson chronology
Unconditional Love (1999)	Missing You (2007)	Stand for Love (2018)

Missing You is the twentieth studio album by American singer Peabo Bryson. It was released by Peak Records on October 2, 2007. The album reached number 41 on the US Top R&B/Hip-Hop Albums chart, becoming Bryson's highest-charting album since Can You Stop the Rain (1991).

== Critical reception ==
Professional ratings
Review scores
Source	Rating
AllMusic	3.5/5 stars

AllMusic editor William Ruhlmann found that Missing You "is not without its contemporary touches, notably in the computer-generated rhythm tracks. But Bryson is not really out to compete with Usher and R. Kelly for the hearts of teenagers here [...] Missing You is an album intended primarily for Bryson's existing fan base and secondarily for smooth jazz fans [...] This is material the singer will have no problem integrating into a stage act dominated by his greatest hits, and it should be welcomed by those who enjoyed his earlier work. It may have been a long time between albums, but musically Bryson acts as though no time at all has passed." SoulTracks critic Chris Rizik praised Bryson's enduring vocal talent on Missing You, highlighting tracks such as "Count On Me," "Don't Make Me Cry," and the title track while criticizing some weaker material. He concluded that although the album was "not the critical breakthrough album his fans have been waiting for," it contained "enough spots of Peabo-magic to make it a worthy return."

== Commercial performance ==
Missing You opened and peaked at number 41 on the US Top R&B/Hip-Hop Albums chart, becoming Bryson's highest-charting album since Can You Stop the Rain (1991). It would spend seven weeks on the chart.

== Track listing ==
Missing You track listing
No.	Title	Writer(s)	Producer(s)	Length
1.	"Heavenly"	Barry Eastmond; Jolyon Skinner; Jonathan Butler	Eastmond	4:35
2.	"Count On Me"	Jack Kugell; Jamie Jones; Jason Pennock; Martin Kember; Tierra Hart	The Heavyweights	4:40
3.	"Waiting for Tomorrow"	Peabo Bryson; Regina Troupe	Bryson; Troupe; Eastmond^{[a]}	4:04
4.	"I Promise I Do"	Bryson; Troupe	Bryson; Troupe; Eastmond^{[a]}; Marc Freeman^{[b]}	5:13
5.	"Missing You"	Ledisi Young; Sundra "Sun" Manning	Eastmond	3:55
6.	"To Love About"	Clark Anderson; Peter Stengaard	Stengaard; Eastmond^{[b]}	4:25
7.	"Don't Make Me Cry"	Arlene Britt; Johnny Britt; Noam Kaniel	Duke Jones; Norman Connors; Bobby Lyle^{[b]}	5:09
8.	"10,000 Reasons"	Bryson	Bryson	4:08
9.	"Don't Give Your Heart"	Alan Rich; Eastmond; Gary Brown	Eastmond	4:48
10.	"I Try"	Angela Bofill	Eastmond; Bryson	5:06
11.	"My Last Goodbye"	Peabo Bryson	Eastmond; Bryson	4:44
Total length:				50:55

Notes

- ^{^[a]} denotes an additional producer
- ^{^[b]} denotes a co-producer

== Personnel and credits ==
Musicians

- Peabo Bryson – vocals, keyboards (3, 4), programming (3, 4, 8, 11), acoustic lead guitar (6)
- Barry Eastmond – keyboards (1, 5, 9, 10), drum programming (1, 3, 9, 11), additional keyboards (3, 4, 11), programming (3, 4, 11), acoustic piano (8), Rhodes electric piano (8), strings (8)
- The Heavyweights – instruments (2)
- Regina Troupe – keyboards (3), programming (3, 4)
- Marc Freeman – keyboards (4), programming (4)
- Blake Eiseman – programming (4)
- Peter Stengaard – programming (6), instruments (6)
- Clark Anderson – additional keyboards (6)
- Bobby Lyle – acoustic piano (7), keyboards (7)
- Phil Hamilton – acoustic guitar (1), guitars (9)
- Paul Jackson Jr. – acoustic guitar (7), electric guitar (7)
- Norman Brown – guitars (8)
- Nathaniel Phillips – bass (4, 10)
- Freddie Washington – bass (7)
- Ricky Lawson – drums (4, 10)
- Leon "Ndugu" Chancler – drums (7)
- Munyungo Jackson – percussion (7)
- Boney James – saxophone (7)
- Paul Taylor – alto sax solo (10)

Background vocals

- Claude Kelly – backing vocals (1)
- Peabo Bryson – backing vocals (2, 6, 9)
- Tierra Hart – backing vocals (2)
- Regina Troupe – backing vocals (2, 3, 5, 8, 11)
- Kim Riley – backing vocals (3)
- Dwight Watkins – backing vocals (3)
- Clark Anderson – backing vocals (6)
- Gary Brown – backing vocals (9)
- Tara Jamelle Jones – backing vocals (9)

Music arrangements

- Barry Eastmond – arrangements (1, 5, 9), horn and string arrangements (4)
- Regina Troupe – horn and string arrangements (4)
- Marc Freeman – horn and string arrangements (4)
- Bobby Lyle – rhythm and string arrangements (7)
- Eric Butler – string contractor (7)

Production

- Peabo Bryson – executive producer (1–6, 8–11)
- Andi Howard – executive producer (1–6, 8–11), A&R
- Mark Wexler – executive producer (1–6, 8–11)
- Clarence O. Smith – executive producer (7)
- Sahirah Uqdah – co-executive producer, A&R
- Marc Freeman – A&R
- Rick Devarona – recording (1, 3–5, 8, 9, 11)
- Barry Eastmond – recording (1, 3–5, 8–11)
- Mike Wilson – recording (2–4, 10)
- Dennis Moody – recording (4, 10)
- Glenn Matullo – recording (6)
- Peter Stengaard – recording (6), mixing (6)
- Dave Rideau – recording (7), mixing (7)
- Ray Bardani – mixing (1, 9)
- Jason Pennock – mixing (2)
- Nick Sodano – mixing (3, 4, 8, 10, 11)
- Stan Wallace – mixing (5)
- Isaiah Abolin – assistant engineer (1, 9)
- Dave Adams – assistant engineer (3, 4, 8, 10, 11)
- Aaron Holton – assistant engineer (3, 4, 8, 10), recording (11)
- Justin Trawick – assistant engineer (3, 4)
- Luke Graham – assistant engineer (4, 10)
- Chris King – assistant engineer (10)
- Vic Anesini – mastering at Sony Music Studios (New York City, New York)
- Sonny Mediana – art direction, package design
- Mike Ruiz – photography
- David M. Franklin & Associates – management

== Charts ==
Chart (2007)	Peak position
US Top R&B/Hip-Hop Albums (Billboard)	41
