= Can You Stop the Rain (album) =

Studio album by Peabo Bryson
- Released: June 4, 1991
- Studios: Boxer Sound; The Plant Studio (Sausalito, California); Tempo Recording (Santa Monica, California); Preferred Sound (Woodland Hills, California); Beat Street Studios (North Hollywood, California); Ground Control Studios (Burbank, California); Cornerstone Studios (Chatsworth, California); Aire L.A. Studios (Glendale, California); Boxer Sound, The Hit Factory and Sear Sound (New York City, New York); Cheshire Sound Studios (Atlanta, Georgia)
- Genres: Funk; soul; pop
- Length: 57:12
- Label: Columbia
- Producers: Walter Afanasieff; Peter Bunetta; Peabo Bryson; Rick Chudacoff; Barry Mann; Sir Gant; Dwight W. Watkins

Peabo Bryson chronology
| All My Love (1989) | Can You Stop the Rain (1991) | Through the Fire (1994) |

Singles from Can You Stop the Rain
- 1. "Can You Stop the Rain" Released: May 4, 1991

Can You Stop the Rain is the fifteenth studio album by American singer Peabo Bryson. It was released by Columbia Records on June 4, 1991, in the United States. Following the release of All My Love (1989), his sole return release with his longtime label, Capitol Records, the singer signed with label Columbia to complete work on his next project along with Walter Afanasieff, Peter Bunetta, Rick Chudacoff, and Barry Mann. Bryson himself became instrumental in composing and producing several songs on his own for the album along with Sir Gant and Dwight W. Watkins.

== Critical reception ==
Professional ratings
Review scores
| Source | Rating |
|---|---|
| AllMusic | 3/5 stars |

AllMusic reviewer William Ruhlmann found that with Can You Stop the Rain "Bryson seemed to have reconciled himself to the public's view of him as primarily a balladeer, and he delivered the goods, especially on the title track [...] and on the Cynthia Weil/Barry Mann tune "Closer Than Close." Bryson helped his own cause considerably by involving himself in the writing and production of five of the 11 songs."

== Chart performance ==
Can You Stop the Rain reached number one on the US Top R&B/Hip-Hop Albums chart, becoming Bryson's first album to do so. It also peaked at number 88 on the US Billboard 200 for the week ending September 14, 1991. This marked Bryson's highest-charting album since Straight from the Heart in 1984. In 1994, Can You Stop the Rain was certified gold by the Recording Industry Association of America (RIAA).

== Track listing ==
| No. | Title | Writer(s) | Producer(s) | Length |
|---|---|---|---|---|
| 1. | "Lost in the Night" | Barry Mann; Cynthia Weil; Hans Zimmer | Walter Afanasieff | 4:35 |
| 2. | "Can You Stop the Rain" | John Bettis; Afanasieff | Afanasieff | 5:35 |
| 3. | "Closer Than Close" | Mann; Weil | Mann | 4:42 |
| 4. | "Shower You with Love" | Peabo Bryson | Bryson; Dwight W. Watkins | 5:30 |
| 5. | "I Can't Imagine" (featuring Regina Belle) | Mann; Gerry Goffin | Afanasieff; Mann (co.) | 4:28 |
| 6. | "I Wish You Love" | Bryson | Bryson; Watkins; Sir Gant | 5:58 |
| 7. | "You Don't Have to Beg" | Bryson | Bryson; Watkins | 5:41 |
| 8. | "I Wanna Be with You" | Bryson | Bryson; Watkins; Sir Gant | 5:43 |
| 9. | "I Just Had to Fall" | Allan D. Rich; Lou Pardini | Peter Bunetta; Rick Chudacoff | 4:45 |
| 10. | "Soul Provider" | Andy Goldmark; Michael Bolton | Bunetta; Chudacoff | 4:52 |
| 11. | "If It's Really Love" | Bryson | Bryson; Watkins | 5:27 |

== Personnel and credits ==
Musicians

- Peabo Bryson – lead vocals, keyboards (4, 6, 7), backing vocals (7)
- Walter Afanasieff – keyboards (1, 2, 5), synthesizers (1, 2, 5), drums (1, 2, 5), percussion (1, 2, 5), additional keyboards (3), synth bass (3)
- Louis Biancaniello – programming (1, 5)
- Ren Klyce – programming (1, 2, 5), additional drums (3), additional percussion (3)
- Gary Cirimelli – programming (2), computer programming (3), synthesizer programming (3)
- Barry Mann – keyboards (3), synthesizers (3), drums (3), percussion (3)
- Sir Dean Gant – keyboards (4, 6, 8), Synclavier drums (6, 8), bass (8)
- Dwight W. Watkins – synthesizers (4, 6, 7, 11), bass guitar (4, 6, 7, 11), computer programming (4, 6, 7, 11), percussion (6, 7, 11), drums (7, 11), backing vocals (7, 11), keyboards (11)
- Marc Freeman – additional programming (4, 6, 7, 11)
- Peter Jacobson – additional programming (4, 6, 7, 11)
- Brad Cole – keyboards (9)
- Reginald "Sonny" Burke – additional keyboards (9)
- Rick Chudacoff – additional keyboards (9)
- Doug Grigsby – keyboards (10)
- Dean Parks – guitars (1)
- Vernon "Ice" Black – guitars (5)
- Paul Jackson Jr. – guitars (6, 8)
- Michael Thompson – guitars (9, 10)
- Edward Emory – cymbals (6, 8)
- Peter Bunetta – drums (9)
- Kirk Whalum – saxophone (5, 9)
- Pattie Howard – backing vocals (1)
- James Ingram – backing vocals (1)
- Phil Perry – backing vocals (1)
- Brenda Russell – backing vocals (1)
- Kitty Beethoven – backing vocals (2)
- Sandy Griffith – backing vocals (2)
- Melisa Kary – backing vocals (2)
- Claytoven Richardson – backing vocals (2)
- Jeanie Tracy – backing vocals (2)
- Carl Anderson – backing vocals (3)
- Kevin Guillaume – backing vocals (3)
- Rick Nelson – backing vocals (3)
- Sandy Simmons – backing vocals (3)
- Alex Brown – backing vocals (4, 6, 8)
- Carl Carwell – backing vocals (4, 6, 8)
- Lynn Davis – backing vocals (4, 6, 8)
- Mortonette Jenkins – backing vocals (4, 6, 8)
- Regina Belle – lead vocals (5)
- Sophia Bender – backing vocals (7, 11)
- Karen Harris – backing vocals (7, 11)
- Terri Wade – backing vocals (7, 11)
- Ada Dyer – backing vocals (9, 10)
- Lani Groves – backing vocals (9, 10)
- Curtis King – backing vocals (9, 10)

Music arrangements

- Walter Afanasieff – arrangements (1, 2, 5)
- Barry Mann – arrangements (1, 3)
- Peabo Bryson – arrangements (4, 6–8, 11), rhythm arrangements (4, 6–8, 11), string arrangements (4, 6–8, 11)
- Dwight W. Watkins – arrangements (4, 6–8, 11), rhythm arrangements (4, 6–8, 11), string arrangements (4, 6–8, 11)
- Sir Dean Gant – arrangements (8)
- Alex Brown – vocal arrangements (8)

Production

- Don Ienner – executive producer
- Jay Landers – executive producer
- Walter Afanasieff – executive producer (3)
- Dana Jon Chappelle – engineer (1, 2, 5), mixing (1, 2, 5)
- Chris Hufford – engineer (3)
- Mick Guzauski – mixing (3, 9, 10)
- Thom Kidd – recording (4, 6–8, 11), mixing (4, 6–8, 11)
- Leon Johnson – recording (9, 10)
- Craig Burbidge – additional overdub recording (4, 6–8, 11)
- Marc Freeman – technical support (4, 6, 7, 11)
- Peter Jacobson –technical support (4, 6, 7, 11)
- Andy Grassi – assistant engineer (1, 2)
- Manny LaCarrubba – assistant engineer (1–3)
- Gragg Lunsford – assistant engineer (2)
- Rich Travali – assistant engineer (2)
- Richard Hasal – assistant engineer (9, 10)
- Fred Kevorkian – assistant engineer (9, 10)
- Jan Lucas – assistant engineer (9, 10)
- Matt Pakucko – assistant engineer (9, 10)
- Vlado Meller – mastering at Sony Music Studio Operations (New York, NY)
- Arnold Levine – art direction
- E.J. Camp – photography
- David M. Franklin & Associates – management

== Charts ==
| Chart (1991–1992) | Peak position |
|---|---|
| Australian Albums (ARIA) | 188 |
| US Billboard 200 | 88 |
| US Top R&B/Hip-Hop Albums (Billboard) | 1 |

== Certifications ==
| Region | Certification | Certified units/sales |
|---|---|---|
| United States (RIAA) | Gold | 500,000^{^} |
^{^} Shipments figures based on certification alone.
