= We're the Best of Friends =

1979 album by Natalie Cole and Peabo Bryson

Studio album by Natalie Cole and Peabo Bryson
- Released: November 2, 1979
- Recorded: 1979
- Studio: Hollywood Sound Recorders (Los Angeles); The Sound Factory (Los Angeles); United Western Recorders (Hollywood)
- Genre: R&B; soul; funk
- Length: 36:09
- Label: Capitol
- Producer: Peabo Bryson; Johnny Pate; Mark Davis; Marvin Yancy

Peabo Bryson chronology
Crosswinds (1978)	We're the Best of Friends (1979)	Paradise (1980)

Natalie Cole albums chronology
I Love You So (1979)	We're the Best of Friends (1979)	Don't Look Back (1980)

We're the Best of Friends is a 1979 duet album by American vocalists Natalie Cole and Peabo Bryson. It was released on November 2, 1979, by Capitol Records.

== Reception ==
Professional ratings
Review scores
Source	Rating
AllMusic	3/5 stars
Variety	(favourable)

The album reached peak positions of number 44 on the Billboard 200 and number 7 on Billboard's R&B Albums chart.

== Track listing ==
1. "Gimme Some Time" (Natalie Cole) - 3:19
2. "This Love Affair" (Marvin Yancy, Natalie Cole) - 4:37
3. "I Want To Be Where You Are" (Peabo Bryson) - 4:15
4. "Your Lonely Heart" (Natalie Cole) - 4:30
5. "What You Won't Do for Love" (Alfons Kettner, Bobby Caldwell) - 6:02
6. "We're the Best of Friends" (Edward Howard, Thomas Campbell) - 4:14
7. "Let's Fall in Love /You Send Me” (Medley) (Harold Arlen, Ted Koehler/Sam Cooke) - 4:08
8. "Love Will Find You" (Peabo Bryson) - 6:09

== Personnel ==
Musicians and Vocalists

- Natalie Cole – lead vocals, backing vocals
- Peabo Bryson – lead vocals, backing vocals (3, 5, 8), keyboards (3, 5, 6, 8), percussion (3, 5, 6, 8)
- Michael Wycoff – keyboards (1, 2, 4, 7)
- Marvin Yancy – keyboards (1, 4, 7)
- Thomas Campbell – keyboards (3, 5, 6, 8)
- Jim Boling – ARP synthesizer (3, 8), Minimoog (3, 8), Prophet-5 (3, 8), trumpet (3, 5, 6, 8), flugelhorn solo (5)
- Robert Palmer – guitars (1, 2)
- Phil Upchurch – guitars (1, 2, 4, 7)
- Richard Horton – guitars (3, 5, 6, 8)
- Keni Burke – bass (1, 2, 4, 7)
- Bobby Eaton – bass (1, 2, 4, 7)
- Dwight W. Watkins – bass (3, 5, 6, 8), backing vocals (3, 5, 8)
- James Gadson – drums (1, 2, 4, 7)
- Andre Robinson – drums (3, 5, 6, 8)
- Eddie "Bongo" Brown – percussion (1)
- Chuck Bryson – percussion (3, 5, 6, 8), backing vocals (3, 5, 8)
- Terry Dukes – percussion (3, 5, 6, 8), backing vocals (3, 5, 8)
- Bill Green – saxophones (2, 4)
- Fred Jackson Jr. – saxophones (2, 4, 7)
- Fred Smith – saxophones (2, 4, 7)
- Ernie Watts – saxophones (2, 4, 7)
- Ron Dover – saxophones (3, 5, 6, 8), tenor sax solo (8)
- George Bohanon – trombone (2, 4, 7)
- Bill Reichenbach Jr. – trombone (2, 4, 7)
- Christopher Riddle – trombone (2, 4, 7)
- Daniel Dillard – trombone (3, 5, 6, 8)
- Oscar Brashear – trumpet (2, 4, 7)
- Bobby Bryant – trumpet (2, 4, 7)
- Thaddeus Johnson – trumpet (3, 5, 6, 8)
- Gayle Levant – harp (6, 8)
- Benjamin Barrett – orchestra contractor (2, 4, 7)
- Harry Bluestone – concertmaster (2, 4, 7)
- Assa Drori – concertmaster (3, 5, 6, 8)

Music arrangements

- David Blumberg – horn and string arrangements (2), conductor (2)
- Mark Davis – arrangements (2, 4, 7)
- Jim Boling – horn arrangements (3, 5)
- Peabo Bryson – horn and rhythm arrangements (3, 5, 6, 8)
- Daniel Dillard – horn arrangements (3, 5)
- Ron Dover – horn arrangements (3, 5)
- Thaddeus Johnson – horn arrangements (3, 5)
- Johnny Pate – string arrangements and conductor (3, 5, 6, 8)
- Linda Williams – horn and string arrangements (4)
- Nelson Riddle – horn and string arrangements (7), conductor (7)

== Production ==
- Cecil Hale – executive producer
- Mark Davis – producer (1, 2, 4, 7)
- Marvin Yancy – producer (1, 2, 4, 7)
- Peabo Bryson – producer (3, 5, 6, 8)
- Johnny Pate – producer (3, 5, 6, 8)
- Rik Pekkonen – engineer, mixing
- Butch Lynch – engineer (horns, rhythm and strings)
- Steve Reyes – engineer (horns, rhythm and strings)
- Gordon Shyrock – vocal engineer
- Bernie Grundman – mastering at A&M Studios (Hollywood, California)
- Leamon Cox – production coordinator
- Janice Williams – spiritual advisor for Natalie Cole
- Melissa Tormé-March – art direction
- John Ernsdorf – graphic design
- V. Hughes Frye – photography
- Adrian Houghton – hair stylist
- Davida – make-up
- Anthony Scott – fashions for Peabo Bryson
- David Franklin & Associates – management for Peabo Bryson
- Kevin Hunter and New Direction – management for Natalie Cole

== Charts ==
Chart (1980)	Peak position
Billboard Pop Albums	44
Billboard Top Soul Albums	7

=== Singles ===
Year	Single	Chart positions
Year	Single	US R&B
1980	"Gimme Some Time"	8
1980	"What You Won't Do for Love"	16
