= Crosswinds (Peabo Bryson album) =

Studio album by Peabo Bryson
- Released: November 1978
- Recorded: 1978
- Studios: A&M Studios (Hollywood, California)
- Genres: Soul, funk
- Length: 42:40
- Label: Capitol
- Producers: Peabo Bryson; Johnny Pate

Peabo Bryson chronology
Reaching for the Sky (1977)	Crosswinds (1978)	We're the Best of Friends (1979)

Professional ratings
Review scores
Source	Rating
Allmusic	4.5/5 stars

Crosswinds is the third album by soul vocalist Peabo Bryson. Released in late 1978, the album reached number three on the US R&B albums chart. The album included the R&B hit "I'm So Into You", which peaked at number two and spent several months on the charts.

== Critical reception ==
Cashbox said Crosswinds is an "impressive collection" of songs with "compelling arrangements", calling Bryson's vocal performance the album's highlight.

== Track listing ==
All tracks composed by Peabo Bryson.

1. "Crosswinds" - 6:02
2. "I'm So Into You" - 5:45
3. "Smile" - 4:45
4. "She's a Woman" - 5:20
5. "Point of View" - 4:40
6. "Spread Your Wings" - 4:58
7. "Don't Touch Me" - 4:55
8. "Love is Watching You" - 5:05

== Personnel ==
- Peabo Bryson – lead vocals, backing vocals, keyboards, horn arrangements, BGV arrangements
- Thomas Campbell – keyboards
- Patrice Rushen – ARP synthesizer
- Jim Boling – ARP synthesizer, flute
- Richard Horton – guitars
- Dwight W. Watkins – bass, backing vocals
- Andre Robinson – drums
- Louis Palomo – percussion
- Ron Dover – saxophones, flute, sax solo (3, 7)
- Daniel Dillard – trombone
- Thaddeus Johnson – trumpet
- Clare Fischer – string arrangements (1, 3-6)
- Johnny Pate – horn arrangements, BGV arrangements, string arrangements (2, 7, 8)
- Gerald Vinci – concertmaster
- Chuck Bryson – backing vocals
- Terry Dukes – backing vocals

== Production ==
- Larkin Arnold – executive producer
- Peabo Bryson – producer, mixing
- Johnny Pate – producer, mixing
- Dave Iveland – recording engineer, mixing engineer
- Richard Cottrell – assistant engineer
- Bernie Grundman – mastering
- Roy Kohara – art direction
- Art Sims – design
- Claude Mougin – photography
- David Franklin & Associates – management

== Charts ==
Chart (1979)	Peak position
Billboard Top LPs & Tape	35
Billboard Top Soul Albums	3

=== Singles ===
Year	Single	Chart positions
Year	Single	US R&B
1978	"Crosswinds"	2
1979	"Crosswinds"	28
1979	"She's a Woman"	44
