= Unconditional Love (Peabo Bryson album) =

Studio album by Peabo Bryson
- Released: April 27, 1999
- Studio: Silent Sound Studios, P.B. Music Studio, Tree Sound Studios and DARP Studios (Atlanta, Georgia); Green Street Recording (New York City, New York); The Hop (Studio City, California); Andee Pandee Productions (Pasadena, California); Mushroom Studios, Bill Buckingham Studios and The Factory Studios (Vancouver, British Columbia, Canada); Hop North (North Vancouver, British Columbia, Canada)
- Genre: R&B
- Length: 58:49
- Label: Private Music
- Producer: Peabo Bryson; Robbie Buchanan; Regina Troupe; Masaru Nishiyama; Michael T. Martin

Peabo Bryson chronology
Peace on Earth (1997)	Unconditional Love (1999)	Missing You (2007)

Unconditional Love is the eighteenth studio album by American singer Peabo Bryson. It was released in the United States by Private Music, a division of the Windham Hill Group, on April 27, 1999. Bryson, along with Regina Troupe, produced the majority of the album himself but also worked with Masaru Nishiyama and frequent collaborator Robbie Buchanan on several tracks. It peaked at no. 75 on the US Top R&B/Hip-Hop Albums chart.

== Critical reception ==
Professional ratings
Review scores
Source	Rating
Allmusic	3/5 stars

Allmusic editor Andrew Hamilton found that Bryson "still exudes a highbrow persona on this late-'90s CD, excelling on "Did You Ever Know," "Ain't Nobody" (the old Rufus song), the umpteenth rendition of Leon Russell's "A Song for You," "The Gift" (a duet with Roberta Flack), and "Light the World," with Deborah Gibson. Pure Peabo, but it carbons previous albums and is only essential to a completist."

== Track listing ==
No.	Title	Writer(s)	Producer(s)	Length
1.	"Eye on You"	Bryson; Regina Troupe	Bryson; Troupe^{[a]}	3:58
2.	"My Heart Belongs to You"	Bryson; Regina Troupe	Bryson; Troupe^{[a]}	4:28
3.	"Unconditional Love"	Bryson	Bryson; Troupe^{[a]}	4:29
4.	"I Wish I Could"	Randy Thomas; Tom Douglas	Robbie Buchanan	4:17
5.	"On and On"	Bryson; Troupe	Bryson; Troupe^{[a]}	4:42
6.	"Did You Ever Know (Acapella Intro)"	Bryson	Bryson; Troupe^{[a]}	0:44
7.	"Did You Ever Know"	Bryson	Bryson; Troupe^{[a]}	5:51
8.	"We've Come Too Far"	Troupe	Bryson; Troupe^{[a]}	4:35
9.	"Ain't Nobody"	David Wolinski	Bryson; Troupe^{[a]}	5:29
10.	"Somebody in Your Life"	Diane Warren; Buchanan	Buchanan	4:33
11.	"A Song for You"	Leon Russell	Bryson; Troupe^{[a]}	6:31
12.	"The Gift" (duet with Roberta Flack)	Jim Brickman; Tom Douglas	Buchanan	4:07
13.	"Light the World" (duet with Deborah Gibson)	Keizo Nakanishi; Morry Stearns; Bryson	Masaru Nishiyama; Michael T. Martin^{[a]}	5:05

Notes

- ^{^[a]} denotes co-producer

== Personnel and credits ==
Musicians

- Peabo Bryson – vocals, Rhodes electric piano (1–3, 5–9, 11), strings (1–3, 5–9, 11), bass (1–3, 5–9, 11), bells (1–3, 5–9, 11)
- Regina Troupe – acoustic piano (1–3, 5–9, 11), Rhodes electric piano (1–3, 5–9, 11), synthesizers (1–3, 5–9, 11), strings (1–3, 5–9, 11), guitars (1–3, 5–9, 11), bass (1–3, 5–9, 11), drum programming (1–3, 5–9, 11), bells (1–3, 5–9, 11), backing vocals (1–3, 5–9, 11)
- Robbie Buchanan – keyboards (4, 10, 12), drums (4, 10), bass (10), acoustic piano (12), organ (12), synth bass (12), drum programming (12), orchestrations (12)
- Tom Keane – keyboards (13), programming (13), strings (13)
- Derek Scott – electric guitar (9)
- Paul Jackson Jr. – guitars (10)
- James Harrah – guitars (12)
- Robbie Steininger – guitars (12)
- Michael Landau – guitars (13)
- Brian Newcombe – bass (4, 11)
- Dwight Watkins – bass (5), backing vocals (7)
- Jerry Adolphe – drums (12)
- Michael Hoskin – saxophone (5, 9)
- Pat Caird – saxophone (12)
- David Boruff – saxophone (13)
- Scott Erickson – orchestral transcripts (12)
- September Gray – backing vocals (2, 7)
- Tania Hancheroff – backing vocals (10)
- Sean Hosein – backing vocals (10)
- Warren Stayner – backing vocals (10)
- Roberta Flack – vocals (12)
- Debbie Gibson – vocals (13)

Production

- Patrick Clifford – A&R
- Andrea Franklin – A&R administration
- Thom Kidd – recording (1–3, 5–8, 13), mixing (1–3, 5–8, 13)
- Brock Landers – mixing (9)
- Mike Alvord – mixing (11)
- Bill Buckingham – BGV recording (10)
- Jeremy Smith – additional engineer (3), recording (4, 10, 12), mixing (4, 10, 12)
- Robbie Buchanan – additional overdubs (3), remixing (3)
- Shawn Grove – additional engineer (5)
- Mike Colomby – additional vocal recording (12)
- Eric Tew – additional vocal recording (12)
- Stephanie Vonarx – assistant engineer (1, 3, 6–8)
- Dallas Shumaker – assistant engineer (2)
- Scott Erickson – assistant engineer (3, 4), production assistant (4, 10)
- Johnny Q – assistant engineer (4)
- Robert Hannon – assistant engineer (5)
- Chest Rockwell – assistant engineer (9)
- John Horesco IV – assistant engineer (11)
- Sheldon Zaharko – mix assistant (3, 4, 10)
- Nathaniel Kunkel – mastering at Hyde Street Studios (San Francisco, California)
- Sonny Mediana – art direction
- Sanae Robertson – design
- E.J. Camp – photography
- David M. Franklin & Associates – management

== Charts ==
Chart (1999)	Peak position
US Top R&B/Hip-Hop Albums (Billboard)	75
