= Paradise (Peabo Bryson album) =

Studio album by Peabo Bryson
- Released: March 13, 1980
- Studios: Hollywood Sound Recorders (Hollywood, California)
- Genres: Soul, R&B
- Length: 42:39
- Label: Capitol
- Producers: Peabo Bryson; Johnny Pate

Peabo Bryson chronology
We're the Best of Friends (1979)	Paradise (1980)	Live & More (1980)

Professional ratings
Review scores
Source	Rating
AllMusic	2/5 stars

Paradise is a studio album by soul vocalist Peabo Bryson, released in 1980. The album charted on the R&B album charts at number thirteen.

== Track listing ==
All tracks composed by Peabo Bryson; except where indicated.

1. "Love Has No Shame" - 5:57
2. "Minute by Minute" (Lester Abrams, Michael McDonald) - 3:20
3. "I Love The Way You Love" - 5:10
4. "Paradise" - 5:35
5. "Love in Every Season" - 6:25
6. "When Will I Learn" - 4:14
7. "I Believe in You" - 6:30
8. "Life Is a Child" - 5:30

== Personnel ==
- Peabo Bryson – lead vocals, backing vocals, keyboards, percussion
- Vance Taylor – Fender Rhodes, synthesizers, backing vocals
- Jim Boling, Jr. – synthesizers, trumpet
- Terry Dukes – synthesizers, backing vocals
- Richard Horton – guitars
- Dwight W. Watkins – bass, backing vocals
- Andre Robinson – drums, timpani
- Chuck Bryson – percussion, backing vocals
- Ron Dover – tenor saxophone, sax solo (3, 5)
- Dan Dillard – trombone, trumpet solo (2)
- Thaddeus Johnson – trumpet, trumpet solo (7)
- Gayle Levant – harp

Handclaps

- Cissy Alexander, Sheri Byers, Louise Foster, Larry McIntosh and Linda Patz

Music arrangements

- Peabo Bryson – horn, rhythm and vocal arrangements
- Johnny Pate – horn arrangements, string arrangements and conductor
- Gerard Vinci – concertmaster

== Production ==
- Cecil Hale – executive producer
- Peabo Bryson – producer
- Johnny Pate – producer
- Rik Pekkonen – recording, mixing
- Bernie Grundman – mastering at A&M Studios (Hollywood, California)
- Daniela Morera – art direction, photography
- Aerographics – design
- David Franklin & Associates – management
- Alvenia Bridges – management
- Philip F. Ransom – management

== Charts ==
Chart (1980)	Peak position
Billboard Pop Albums	79
Billboard Top Soul Albums	13

=== Singles ===
Year	Single	Chart positions
Year	Single	US R&B
1980	"Minute By Minute"	12
1980	"I Love The Way You Love"	39
