= Peace on Earth (Peabo Bryson album) =

Studio album by Peabo Bryson
- Released: November 4, 1997
- Studio: The Hop (Studio City, California); Bill Schnee Studios (North Hollywood, California); Capitol Studios (Hollywood, California); Aire Born Studios (Indianapolis, Indiana); The Factory Studios (Vancouver, British Columbia, Canada)
- Genre: R&B; holiday
- Length: 38:26
- Label: Angel
- Producer: Robbie Buchanan

Peabo Bryson chronology
Through the Fire (1994)	Peace on Earth (1997)	Unconditional Love (1999)

Peace on Earth is the seventeenth studio album by American singer Peabo Bryson. It was released by Angel Records on November 4, 1997 in the United States. Produced by Canadian musician Robbie Buchanan, it marked Bryson's first Christmas album. The standard edition of Peace on Earth consists of ten tracks, featuring the original song "Born on Christmas Day" and nine cover versions of Christmas standards and carols, two of which are duets featuring recording artists Sandi Patti and Roberta Flack. Upon release, Peace on Earth failed to chart, though Christmas with You, a 2005 reissue, released by Time Life, peaked at number 10 on the US Top Holiday Albums chart in 2006. It also includes the song "As Long As There's Christmas" with Roberta Flack, from the end credits of the 1997 Disney Christmas film Beauty and the Beast: The Enchanted Christmas as he returned from the theme song to the first film, he was considering dueting the song with Celine Dion but she was unavailable at the time.

== Critical reception ==
Professional ratings
Review scores
Source	Rating
AllMusic	3/5 stars

AllMusic editor Jason Ankeny rated the album three stars out of five.

== Track listing ==
All tracks were produced and arranged by Robbie Buchanan; except "My Gift Is You," produced Hibiki Hanasaka and co-produced by Tom Keane.

No.	Title	Writer(s)	Length
1.	"Have Yourself a Merry Little Christmas"	Hugh Martin; Ralph Blane	4:04
2.	"Born on Christmas Day"	Buchanan; Peabo Bryson; Keith Andes	4:30
3.	"It's the Most Wonderful Time of the Year"	Edward Pola; George Wyle	3:02
4.	"O Holy Night" (duet with Sandi Patti)	Traditional	4:10
5.	"The Christmas Song (Chestnuts Roasting on an Open Fire)"	Robert Wells; Mel Tormé	3:58
6.	"This Christmas"	Donny Hathaway; Nadine McKinnor	3:36
7.	"Moments Like This"	Joie Scott; Richard Wold	3:54
8.	"As Long as There's Christmas" (duet with Roberta Flack)	Rachel Portman; Don Black	4:57
9.	"I'll Be Home for Christmas"	Kim Gannon; Walter Kent; Buck Ram	4:05
10.	"Silent Night"	Traditional	3:26

Japanese edition
No.	Title	Writer(s)	Length
1.	"My Gift Is You (Christmas Mix)" (duet with Wendy Moten)	Morry Stearns; Hanasaka	3:34
2.	"Have Yourself a Merry Little Christmas"	Martin; Blane	4:04
3.	"Born on Christmas Day"	Buchanan; Bryson; Andes	4:30
4.	"It's the Most Wonderful Time of the Year"	Pola; Wyle	3:02
5.	"O Holy Night" (duet with Sandi Patti)	Traditional	4:10
6.	"The Christmas Song (Chestnuts Roasting on an Open Fire)"	Wells; Tormé	3:58
7.	"This Christmas"	Hathaway; McKinnor	3:36
8.	"Moments Like This"	Scott; Wold	3:54
9.	"As Long as There's Christmas" (duet with Roberta Flack)	Portman; Black	4:57
10.	"I'll Be Home for Christmas"	Gannon; Kent; Ram	4:05
11.	"Silent Night"	Traditional	3:26
12.	"My Gift Is You" (duet with Wendy Moten)	Stearns; Hanasaka	3:53

== Personnel ==
Musicians

- Peabo Bryson – vocals
- Robbie Buchanan – keyboards, Hammond B3 organ, bass, drum programming
- James Harrah – guitars
- Mike Baird – drums
- Steve Tavaglione – saxophones, flute, EWI
- Tommy Morgan – harmonica
- Warren Stayner – backing vocals (2)
- Sandi Patty – vocals (4)
- Roberta Flack – vocals (8)
- Wendy Moten – vocals (12)

Production

- Jay Landers – executive producer
- Bambi Moé – executive producer (8)
- Robbie Buchanan – producer, arrangements
- Jeremy Smith – recording, mixing (1–7, 9, 10)
- Bill Buckingham – BGV recording (2)
- John Bolt – vocal recording for Sandi Patty (4)
- Bill Schnee – mixing (8)
- Koji Egawa – assistant engineer
- Scott Erickson – assistant engineer, production coordinator
- Johnny Q – assistant engineer
- Sheldon Zaharko – assistant mix engineer
- Doug Sax – mastering at The Mastering Lab (Hollywood, California)
- Nancy Roof – production coordinator
- J.C. Suares – art direction, photography
- Blake Little – photography
- Michael M. Franklin & Associates – management

== Charts ==
Chart (2006)	Peak position
US Top Holiday Albums (Billboard)	10

== Release history ==
List of release dates, showing region, formats, label, editions, and reference
Region	Date	Format(s)	Label	Edition(s)	Ref.
Various	November 4, 1997	CD; cassette	Angel	Standard edition	
Various	October 4, 2005	CD; digital download	Time Life	Christmas with You reissue	
