= Through the Fire (Peabo Bryson album) =

Studio album by Peabo Bryson
- Released: June 14, 1994
- Studios: Record Plant and Studio G (Los Angeles, California); Sunset Sound (Hollywood, California); The Plant (Sausalito, California); Ground Control Studios, Devonshire Sound Studios and Encore Studios (Burbank, California); Chartmaker Studios (Malibu, California); Bosstown Recording Studios, Musiplex and Studio LaCoCo (Atlanta, Georgia); The Bennett House (Franklin, Tennessee); The Power Station, Right Track Recording and Battery Studios (New York City, New York)
- Genres: Rock; funk; soul
- Length: 57:08
- Label: Columbia
- Producers: Walter Afanasieff; Peabo Bryson; David Foster; Richard Perry; Keith Rawls; Keith Thomas; Dwight Watkins

Peabo Bryson chronology
Can You Stop the Rain (1991)	Through the Fire (1994)	Peace on Earth (1997)

Through the Fire is the sixteenth studio album by American singer Peabo Bryson. It was released by Columbia Records on June 14, 1994, in the United States and marked Bryson's first full-length album after the release of his global hit Disney duets "Beauty and the Beast" (1991) and "A Whole New World" (1992). The singer reteamed with David Foster, Walter Afanasieff, and Dwight Watkins and consulted upcoming producers Keith Rawls, Keith Thomas and Marc Freeman to work with him on the majority of Through the Fire which was titled after Bryson's cover of the Foster-penned Chaka Khan song (1984).

== Critical reception ==
Professional ratings
Review scores
Source	Rating
Allmusic	3/5 stars

Billboard called Through the Fire "a strong new set that dishes up the greatest hits, plus a few that someday may be. Among the new tunes are Diane Warren-penned first single “Why Goodbye” and Bryson originals "Same Ol' Love," a sultry delight, and sax-spiced "Spanish Eyes."

== Track listing ==
No.	Title	Writer(s)	Producer(s)	Length
1.	"Treat Her Like a Lady"	Keith Thomas	Thomas	4:23
2.	"A Whole New World" (with Regina Belle)	Alan Menken; Tim Rice	Walter Afanasieff	4:05
3.	"Love Will Take Care of You"	Thomas; Tony Haynes	Thomas	4:30
4.	"Never Saw a Miracle"	Barry Mann; Curtis Stigers	Richard Perry	3:46
5.	"Why Goodbye"	Diane Warren	David Foster	4:23
6.	"Through the Fire"	Foster; Tom Keane; Cynthia Weil	Foster; Bryson (add.)	5:06
7.	"Spanish Eyes"	Bryson	Bryson; Dwight Watkins	6:30
8.	"By the Time This Night Is Over" (with Kenny G)	Andy Goldmark; Warren; Michael Bolton	Foster; Afanasieff	4:45
9.	"Beauty and the Beast" (with Céline Dion)	Howard Ashman; Menken	Afanasieff	4:04
10.	"You Can Have Me Anytime"	Boz Scaggs; Foster	Foster	4:39
11.	"Don't Make Me Wait"	Keith Rawls; Bryson	Rawls; Bryson	5:36
12.	"Same Old Love"	Bryson	Bryson; Watkins	5:10

== Personnel and credits ==
Musicians

- Peabo Bryson – lead vocals, backing vocals (6), synthesizers (7, 12)
- Keith Thomas – synthesizers (1, 3), bass programming (1, 3), drums (1), percussion (1), drum programming (3)
- Walter Afanasieff – keyboards (2, 8, 9), synthesizers (2, 8, 9), bass (2, 8, 9), rhythm programming (2, 8, 9), Synclavier programming (2), drums (8), Synclavier (9), acoustic guitar (9)
- Gary Cirimelli – Macintosh programming (2), Synclavier programming (2, 8), Akai programming (8)
- Ren Klyce – Akai programming (2, 9), Synclavier programming (2, 9)
- Dan Shea – additional programming (2), keyboards (8), programming (8), Macintosh programming (9)
- Mark Portmann – synthesizer programming (4), drum programming (4)
- Randy Kerber – keyboards (5, 10)
- Claude Gaudette – additional synthesizers (5)
- Robbie Buchanan – additional keyboards (6), synthesizers (6), programming (6)
- David Foster – keyboards (6)
- Dwight Watkins – keyboards (7, 11, 12), bass (7, 11), backing vocals (7, 12)
- Simon Franglen – additional synthesizers (10)
- Keith Rawls – keyboards (11)
- Dann Huff – guitars (1)
- Michael Landau – guitars (2)
- Michael Thompson – guitars (4–6, 8, 10)
- Eric Brice – guitars (11)
- Nathan East – bass (4)
- Neil Stubenhaus – bass (5, 10)
- Mark Hammond – drums (1), percussion (1), drum programming (3)
- Jay Oliver – drums (1), percussion (1)
- John Robinson – drums (5, 10)
- Marc Freeman – drum programming (6), Akai programming (7, 11, 12), Roland DM-800 (7, 11, 12)
- Jeff Lorber – drum loops (6)
- Denis Solee – soprano saxophone (1)
- David Boruff – saxophone (6)
- Michael Hoskin – saxophone (7)
- Kenny G – soprano saxophone (8), saxophone (11)
- Joel Peskin – electronic oboe (9)
- Billy Gaines – backing vocals (1, 3)
- Trey Lorenz – backing vocals (1, 3)
- Chris Rodriguez – backing vocals (1, 3)
- Chris Willis – backing vocals (1, 3)
- Regina Belle – lead vocals (2)
- Alex Brown – backing vocals (5, 6)
- Carmen Carter – backing vocals (5)
- Warren Wiebe – backing vocals (5)
- September Gray – backing vocals (6, 7, 11, 12)
- Katrina Perkins – backing vocals (6)
- Regina Troupe – backing vocals (6, 7, 11, 12)
- Yvonne Williams – backing vocals (6)
- Lynn Davis – backing vocals (8)
- Jim Gilstrap – backing vocals (8)
- Portia Griffin – backing vocals (8)
- Pat Hawk – backing vocals (8)
- Phillip Ingram – backing vocals (8)
- Vann Johnson – backing vocals (8)
- Rose Stone – backing vocals (8)
- Fred White – backing vocals (8)
- Celine Dion – lead vocals (9)
- Maryline Blackburn – backing vocals (11)
- Gigi Allen – backing vocals (12)

Music arrangements

- Keith Thomas – arrangements (1, 3), BGV arrangements (1, 3)
- Emanuel Officer – BGV arrangements (1)
- Walter Afanasieff – arrangements (2, 8, 9), orchestra arrangements (9)
- Robbie Buchanan – additional arrangements (2), arrangements (9)
- Trey Lorenz – BGV arrangements (3)
- William Ross – string arrangements (4, 5, 10)
- David Foster – arrangements (5, 6, 10), string arrangements (5, 10)
- Jeremy Lubbock – string arrangements (6)
- Peabo Bryson – arrangements (7, 11, 12)
- Dwight Watkins – arrangements (7, 12)
- Keith Rawls – arrangements (11)

Production

- Todd Moore – production coordinator (1, 3)
- Cord Himmelstein – production coordinator (4)
- Barbara Stout – production coordinator (9)
- Danny Capes – production coordinator (11)
- Bill Whittington – recording (1, 3), mixing (1, 3)
- Dana Jon Chappelle – engineer (2, 8, 9), mixing (2, 9)
- Ed Goodreau – recording (4)
- Alex Rodriguez – recording (4), assistant engineer (6)
- Chris Trevett – recording (4), mixing (7, 12)
- Humberto Gatica – mixing (4, 6), engineer (5, 6, 10)
- David Reitzas – engineer (5, 6, 10)
- Mick Guzauski – mixing (5, 8, 10)
- Thom Kidd – overdub recording (6), overdub mixing (6)
- David Norman – engineer (7, 11, 12)
- Barney Perkins – mixing (11)
- Shawn McLean – assistant engineer (1, 3)
- Greg Parker – assistant engineer (1, 3)
- Kyle Bess – second engineer (2, 9)
- Manny LaCarrubba – second engineer (2, 9)
- Jen Monnar – second engineer (2)
- Mike Alvord – assistant engineer (3)
- Craig Block – assistant engineer (4), mix assistant (6)
- Thom Cadley – assistant engineer (4)
- Mike Klostner – assistant engineer (4)
- Brian Soucy – assistant engineer (4)
- Felipe Elgueta – additional engineer (5, 10), engineer (6)
- Jeff Graham – mix assistant (5, 10)
- Marc Freeman – additional overdub recording (6)
- Bradshaw Leigh – additional recording (7, 11, 12)
- Kevin Becka – additional engineer (8), assistant engineer (8)
- David Gleason – additional engineer (8)
- Steve Sheppard – additional engineer (8), assistant engineer (8)
- Jeffrey "Woody" Woodruff – additional engineer (8)
- Matthew Lamonica – second engineer (9)
- David Betancourt – assistant engineer (11)
- Greg Calbi – mastering at Sterling Sound (New York, NY)
- Janet Weber – project supervisor
- Tony Sellari – art direction
- E.J. Camp – photography
- Jeffrey Tay – stylist
- David M. Franklin & Associates– management

== Charts ==
Chart (1994)	Peak position
Australian Albums (ARIA)	193
US Top R&B/Hip-Hop Albums (Billboard)	54
