= Reaching for the Sky =

Studio album by Peabo Bryson
- Released: January 16, 1978
- Recorded: 1977
- Studio: P.S. Studios and Universal Recording Corporation (Chicago, Illinois); ABC Recording Studios (Los Angeles, California)
- Genre: Soul, funk
- Length: 36:16
- Label: Capitol
- Producer: Peabo Bryson; Richard Evans

Peabo Bryson chronology
Peabo (1976)	Reaching for the Sky (1978)	Crosswinds (1978)

Reaching for the Sky is the second album by soul vocalist Peabo Bryson.

== Reception ==
Professional ratings
Review scores
Source	Rating
Allmusic	4.5/5 stars

Released in 1978, Reaching for the Sky was Bryson's debut album on Capitol Records, charting with Quiet Storm staple "Feel the Fire" at number 13 on the R&B singles chart. This tune was covered by Stephanie Mills in 1979 on her What Cha' Gonna Do with My Lovin' album and again in 1980 by Teddy Pendergrass as a duet with Mills on his TP album. The midtempo title track, "Reaching for the Sky", was even more commercially successful, reaching number 6 on the R&B chart.

== Track listing ==
All songs written by Peabo Bryson

1. "Reaching for the Sky" - 4:56
2. "Feel the Fire" - 5:03
3. "A Fool Already Knows" - 4:02
4. "Hold On to the World" - 4:41
5. "Love from Your Heart" - 5:22
6. "Love Walked Out on Me" - 5:36
7. "You Haven't Learned About Love" - 3:32
8. "Have a Good Time" - 4:58

== Personnel ==
- Peabo Bryson – lead vocals, backing vocals
- Paul Libman – keyboards
- Terry Fryer – Moog synthesizer
- Ross Traut – lead guitars, guitar solo (7)
- Danny Leake – rhythm guitars
- Larry Ball – bass
- Morris Jennings – drums, percussion
- Bobby Christian – vibraphone, percussion, bells
- Sonny Seals – saxophone solo (8)
- Richard Evans – arrangements
- Dr. Warric Carter – horn and string conductor
- Johnny Pate – rhythm conductor
- Jynean Bell – backing vocals
- Chuck Colbert – backing vocals
- Sharon Johnson – backing vocals
- Cynthia White – backing vocals

== Production ==
- Larkin Arnold – executive producer
- Peabo Bryson – producer
- Richard Evans – producer
- Bob Brooks – recording
- Harry Brotman – recording
- Zollie Johnson – recording
- Barney Perkins – recording
- Jim Scheffler – recording
- Paul Serrano – recording
- Stu Walters – recording
- Ken Perry – mastering at Capitol Records (Hollywood, California)
- Roy Kohara – art direction
- Art Sims – design
- Dick Zimmerman – photography

== Charts ==
=== Weekly charts ===
Chart (1978)	Peak position
US Billboard 200	49
US Top R&B/Hip-Hop Albums (Billboard)	11

=== Year-end charts ===
Chart (1978)	Position
US Billboard 200	85
US Top R&B/Hip-Hop Albums (Billboard)	12

=== Singles ===
Year	Single	Chart positions
Year	Single	US R&B
1978	"Feel The Fire"	13
1978	"Reaching For The Sky"	6

== Certifications ==
Region	Certification	Certified units/sales
United States (RIAA)	Gold	500,000^{^}
^{^} Shipments figures based on certification alone.
