= Take No Prisoners (Peabo Bryson album) =

Studio album by Peabo Bryson
- Released: June 1985
- Studios: The Power Station, Atlantic Studios, Automated Sound Studios and Clinton Recording Studio (New York City, New York); Sunset Sound and Music Grinder Studios (Hollywood, California); Bill Schnee Studios and Amigo Studios (North Hollywood, California); Bossa Nova Hotel (San Fernando, California)
- Genres: Electronic; Funk; Pop; Rock; Soul
- Length: 40:22
- Label: Elektra
- Producers: Arif Mardin; Tommy LiPuma

Peabo Bryson chronology
Straight from the Heart (1984)	Take No Prisoners (1985)	Quiet Storm (1986)

Take No Prisoners is the eleventh studio album by American singer-songwriter Peabo Bryson It was released by Elektra Records in June 1985 in the United States. Produced by Arif Mardin and Tommy LiPuma, the album peaked at number 102 on the US Billboard 200 and number 40 on the US R&B albums chart.

Three singles were released, including the title track and the pop crossover ballad "Love Always Finds a Way", the latter of which peaked at number 26 on the US Adult Contemporary chart in early 1986. The album's title track became a minor hit on both the pop and R&B charts, supported by a Miami Vice-inspired music video. In addition to Chaka Khan, contributing artists include Jennifer Holliday, Kashif, and Robbie Buchanan.

== Critical reception ==
Professional ratings
Review scores
Source	Rating
AllMusic	3/5 stars

In a retrospective review, William Ruhlmann of AllMusic found that Take No Prisoners "represented a missed opportunity for Bryson, even though he sang with his usual assurance, the material was of good quality, and the production was sympathetic."

== Track listing ==
Side A
No.	Title	Writer(s)	Producer(s)	Length
1.	"Take No Prisoners (In the Game of Love)"	Billy Livsey; Sue Shifrin	Arif Mardin	4:12
2.	"There's Nothin' Out There" (with Chaka Khan)	Hawk Wolinski; Patrick Leonard; Keithen Carter	Mardin	5:26
3.	"Let's Apologize"	Gary Usher; Billy Steinberg; Tom Kelly	Mardin	3:56
4.	"Irresistible (Never Run Away from Love)"	Livsey; Peabo Bryson; Mardin; Philippe Saisse	Mardin	5:30

Side B
No.	Title	Writer(s)	Producer(s)	Length
5.	"Love Always Finds a Way"	Tom Snow; Cynthia Weil	Tommy LiPuma	4:48
6.	"Falling for You"	Bryson	LiPuma	4:10
7.	"I'm in Love"	Bryson	Mardin	4:17
8.	"When You Talk to Me"	Ralph Dino; Larry Di Tomaso	LiPuma	4:11
9.	"She's Over Me"	Barry Mann; Weil	LiPuma	3:27

== Personnel ==
Musicians

- Robbie Buchanan – acoustic piano (1, 3, 7), synthesizers (1, 3, 5–9), programming (1, 3, 7), rhythm arrangements (1, 3, 5–9), keyboards (2, 5, 6, 8, 9), synthesizer programming (2)
- Philippe Saisse – additional synth solo (2), keyboards (4), synthesizers (4), programming (4), rhythm arrangements (4)
- Dann Huff – guitars
- Will Lee – bass (1)
- Marcus Miller – bass (3, 7)
- Anthony Jackson – bass (5, 6, 8, 9)
- Steve Ferrone – drums (1, 3–5, 7–9), cymbals (2), tom-toms (2)
- Dave Weckl – drums (6)
- Lenny Castro – percussion (5, 8, 9)
- Ron Dover – saxophone (6)
- Arif Mardin – rhythm arrangements (2, 4)

Vocalists

- Peabo Bryson – lead vocals
- Erin Dickins – backing vocals (1–3, 7)
- Tommy Funderburk – backing vocals (1, 3, 7)
- Diva Gray – backing vocals (1–3, 7)
- Gordon Grody – backing vocals (1–3, 7)
- Tom Kelly – backing vocals (1, 3, 7)
- Edie Lehmann – backing vocals (1, 3, 7)
- Chaka Khan – backing vocals (2), rap (2)
- Mark Stevens – backing vocals (2)
- Kashif – backing vocals (4)
- Yolanda Lee Lewis – backing vocals (4)
- Brenda Nelson – backing vocals (4)
- Jennifer Holliday – backing vocals (5)
- Stephanie James – backing vocals (5)
- Michael Sembello – backing vocals (8)

Production

- Arif Mardin – producer (1–4, 7)
- Tommy LiPuma – producer (5, 6, 8, 9)
- Phillip Namanworth – project coordinator (1–4, 7)
- Frank DeCaro – music contractor (1–4, 7)
- Larry Fishman – production coordinator (6)
- Carol Friedman – art direction, photography
- Carin Goldberg – design
- Quietfire – grooming
- Gerard Bianchi – stylist
- Linda Happ – woman's stylist
- Peabo Bryson – sleeve notes
- David M. Franklin & Associates, Ed Howard and Skip Williams – management

Technical credits

- Lew Hahn – recording (1–4, 7), mixing (1–3, 7)
- Ed Rak – engineer (5, 8, 9)
- Bill Schnee – mixing (5, 6, 8, 9)
- Jay Rifkin – engineer (6)
- Michael O'Reilly – assistant engineer (1–4, 7), additional engineer (1–4, 7), mixing (4)
- Dan Garcia – mix assistant (5, 6, 8, 9)
- Mike Ross – mix assistant (5, 6, 8, 9)
- Gene Curtis – second engineer (5, 8, 9)
- Garry Rindfuss – second engineer (6)
- Gary Skardina – additional engineer (1–4, 7)
- Jeremy Smith – additional engineer (1–4, 7)
- Kevin Halpin – additional recording (5)
- Mark Linett – additional recording (5, 9)
- Erik Zobler – additional recording (6)
- Al Schmitt – additional recording (8)
- Nick Spigel – additional recording (8)
- Jerry Garcia – additional assistant engineer (1–4, 7)
- Jon Ingoldsby – additional assistant engineer (1–4, 7)
- Leslie Klein – additional second engineer (5)
- Peggy McCreary – additional second engineer (6)
- Bud Rizzo – additional second engineer (8)
- Steven Strassman – additional second engineer (8)

== Charts ==
Chart (1985)	Peak position
US Billboard 200	102
US Top R&B/Hip-Hop Albums (Billboard)	40
