= Peabo =

Studio album by Peabo Bryson
- Released: September 1976
- Recorded: 1976
- Studios: Wally Heider Studios (Hollywood, California); Web IV Studios (Atlanta, Georgia); Muscle Shoals Sound Studios (Sheffield, Alabama); Sound Ideas Studios (New York City, New York)
- Genres: Soul, funk
- Length: 34:32
- Label: Bullet
- Producer: Peabo Bryson

Peabo Bryson chronology
Peabo (1976)	Reaching for the Sky (1977)

Peabo is the debut album by soul vocalist Peabo Bryson. Luther Vandross and Cissy Houston were among the background vocalists on this album.

== Reception ==
Professional ratings
Review scores
Source	Rating
Allmusic	3/5 stars

Released in 1976 on Bullet Records, this was Bryson's only album with the label before moving on to Capitol Records. Capitol subsequently took control of the rights to this album and the rest of his Bullet recordings released and unreleased.

== Track listing ==
All songs written by Peabo Bryson, except where noted.

1. "Just Another Day" - 3:42
2. "Do You Believe in Love" - 2:54 (Bryson, Paul Davis)
3. "It's Just a Matter of Time" - 3:31
4. "I Can Make It Better" - 5:08
5. "You Bring Out The Best in Me" - 3:57
6. "Smile" - 4:58
7. "Underground Music" - 3:31
8. "Lovely Lady" - 4:05
9. "Let The Music Play" - 3:21
10. "God is On Our Side" - 3:55

== Personnel ==
- Peabo Bryson – lead vocals
- Robin Clark, Hilda Harris, Cissy Houston, Troy Keyes, Ed Seay, Maeretha Stewart, Diane Sumler and Luther Vandross – backing vocals
- Gene Page – arrangements (1–3, 5, 7–10)
- Michael Zager – arrangements (4, 6)

Muscle Shoals Rhythm Section (Tracks 1–3 & 7)

- Barry Beckett – keyboards
- Jesse Carr – guitars
- Jimmy Johnson – guitars
- David Hood – bass guitar
- Roger Hawkins – drums, percussion

L.A. Rhythm Section (Tracks 4-5, 8-9)

- Sylvester Rivers – keyboards
- Rick Littlefield – guitars
- Ray Parker Jr. – guitars
- David T. Walker – guitars
- Henry Davis – bass guitar
- Ed Greene – drums
- Gary Coleman – percussion
- Bobbye Hall – percussion

Bottom & Co. Rhythm Section (Track 6)

- Fred Birdwell – keyboards
- Jesse Boyce – synthesizers, bass guitar
- John Helms – guitars
- Freeman Brown – drums
- Sanchez Harley – saxophone

Bang Rhythm Section (Track 10)

- Peabo Bryson – keyboards
- Ronn Price – keyboards, guitars, bass guitar
- Thom Fowle – guitars
- Beaver Parker – drums, percussion

== Production ==
- Eddie Biscoe – executive producer, art direction
- Ilene Biscoe – executive producer
- Peabo Bryson – producer
- Tom Roberts – engineer
- Rick Rowe – engineer, mixing
- Ed Seay – engineer, mixing
- Masterfonics (Nashville, Tennessee) – mastering location
- Mike McCarty – design, photo retouching
- David Alexander – photography
- Tamara Dobson – back cover model

== Charts ==
Chart (1976)	Peak position
US Top Soul Albums	48

=== Singles ===
Year	Single	Chart positions
Year	Single	US R&B
1976	"It's Just A Matter Of Time"	22
1976	"Underground Music"	22
1977	"I Can Make It Better"	23
1977	"Just Another Day"	27
