= Quiet Storm (Peabo Bryson album) =

Studio album by Peabo Bryson
- Released: October 1986
- Studio: Mastersound Studios (Atlanta, Georgia)
- Genre: R&B; electronic; funk; pop; soul
- Length: 37:58
- Label: Elektra
- Producer: Peabo Bryson

Peabo Bryson chronology
| Take No Prisoners (1985) | Quiet Storm (1986) | Positive (1988) |

Quiet Storm is the twelfth studio album by American singer Peabo Bryson. It was released by Elektra Records in October 1986 in the United States. The album peaked at number 45 on the US Top R&B/Hip-Hop Albums.

== Critical reception ==
Professional ratings
Review scores
| Source | Rating |
|---|---|
| Allmusic | 2/5 stars |

Ron Wynn of AllMusic found that the results of "some over-produced, effectively sung ballads and a few decent up-tempo tracks [...] were disappointing but mildly successful."

== Track listing ==
All tracks produced by Bryson and co-produced by Dwight Watkins.

| No. | Title | Writer(s) | Length |
|---|---|---|---|
| 1. | "Since I've Been in Love" | Peabo Bryson | 4:56 |
| 2. | "Somebody in Your Life" | Robbie Buchanan; Diane Warren | 4:21 |
| 3. | "Good Combination" | Keith Rawls | 4:34 |
| 4. | "If You Love Me (Let Me Know)" | Bryson | 4:35 |
| 5. | "The Higher You Climb" | Bryson | 5:04 |
| 6. | "Catch 22" | Bryson | 4:23 |
| 7. | "Only at Night" | Bryson | 4:52 |
| 8. | "After You" | Bryson | 4:49 |

== Personnel ==
Musicians

- Peabo Bryson – vocals, keyboards, percussion, arrangements
- Myra Walker – keyboards, backing vocals
- Oliver Wells – keyboards
- George Martin – synthesizers
- Dwight W. Watkins – synthesizers, bass, drum machine programming, backing vocals, arrangements (3)
- Pat Buchanan – guitars
- Bill Mueller – guitars
- Derek Scott – guitars
- Yonrico Scott – drums, drum machine programming
- Charles Bryson – percussion
- Jimmy "Lord" Brown – saxophones
- Valorie Jones – backing vocals
- Sharon Scott – backing vocals
- Jeanie Tracy – backing vocals
- Brenda Williams – backing vocals
- Cheryl Wilson – backing vocals

Technical and Design

- Ron Christopher – engineer
- Doug Johnson – engineer
- Brett Richardson – assistant engineer
- Jeff Tomei – assistant engineer
- Glenn Meadows – mastering at Georgetown Masters (Nashville, Tennessee).
- Bob Defrin – art direction
- Carol Friedman – photography
- Quietfire – grooming
- Lisa Silvestri – wardrobe stylist
- David M. Franklin & Associates, Ed Howard and Skip Williams – management

== Charts ==
| Chart (1986) | Peak position |
|---|---|
| US Top R&B/Hip-Hop Albums (Billboard) | 45 |
