= Live & More (Roberta Flack and Peabo Bryson album) =

Live album by Roberta Flack and Peabo Bryson
- Released: December 1, 1980
- Recorded: 1980
- Venue: The Holiday Star Theater (Merrillville, Indiana)
- Studios: The Hit Factory and Record Plant Mobile Studio (New York City, New York)
- Genres: Soul, R&B
- Length: 98:14
- Label: Atlantic
- Producers: Peabo Bryson Roberta Flack

Roberta Flack chronology
Roberta Flack Featuring Donny Hathaway (1980)	Live & More (1980)	The Best of Roberta Flack (1981)

Peabo Bryson albums chronology
Paradise (1980)	Live & More (1980)	Turn the Hands of Time (1981)

Professional ratings
Review scores
Source	Rating
Allmusic	3/5 stars

Live & More is a two-disc live album between Roberta Flack and Peabo Bryson recorded and released in 1980. In 1983, the duo recorded a follow-up to Live & More titled Born to Love.

Live and More reached number ten on the US R&B albums chart.

== Track listing ==
1. "Only Heaven Can Wait (For Love)" (Eric Mercury, Roberta Flack)/ "You Are My Heaven" (Eric Mercury, Stevie Wonder) - 9:30
2. "Make the World Stand Still" (Peabo Bryson, Roberta Flack) - 5:46 (new studio recording)
3. "Feel the Fire" (Peabo Bryson) - 8:30
4. "God Don't Like Ugly" (Gwen Guthrie) - 4:58
5. "If Only for One Night" (Brenda Russell) - 5:53 (new studio recording)
6. "Love Is a Waiting Game" (Peabo Bryson, Roberta Flack) - 7:24 (new studio recording)
7. "Reachin' for the Sky" (Peabo Bryson) - 7:39
8. "Killing Me Softly with His Song" (Charles Fox, Norman Gimbel) - 5:48
9. "More Than Everything" (Peabo Bryson, Roberta Flack) - 4:02 (new studio recording)
10. "Feel Like Makin' Love" (Eugene McDaniels) - 5:48
11. "When Will I Learn" (Peabo Bryson) - 4:37
12. "Don't Make Me Wait Too Long" (Stevie Wonder) - 9:07
13. "Back Together Again" (James Mtume, Reggie Lucas) - 6:21
14. "Love in Every Season/I Believe in You" (Peabo Bryson) - 12:24

== Personnel ==
- Peabo Bryson – lead vocals, arrangements (2, 6, 9)
- Roberta Flack – lead vocals, arrangements (2, 6, 9)

Peabo's band

- Vance Taylor – keyboards, backing vocals
- Jim Boling – synthesizers, trumpet
- Richard Horton – guitars
- Dwight Watkins – bass, backing vocals
- Andre Robinson – drums
- Chuck Bryson – percussion, backing vocals
- Ron Dover – tenor saxophone
- Daniel Dillard – trombone
- Thaddeus Johnson – trumpet, flugelhorn
- Terry Dukes – backing vocals

Roberta's band

- Barry Miles – keyboards, Moog synthesizer, arrangements (2, 6, 9), conductor
- Ed Walsh – Oberheim synthesizer
- Georg Wadenius – guitars, backing vocals
- Marcus Miller – bass, backing vocals
- Buddy Williams – drums, backing vocals
- Errol "Crusher" Bennett – percussion
- Yvonne Lewis – backing vocals
- Luther Vandross – backing vocals, BGV arrangements
- Brenda White – backing vocals

== Production ==
- Peabo Bryson – producer
- Roberta Flack – producer
- Howie Lindeman – engineer
- Chris Tergesen – engineer
- Bruce Tergesen – additional engineer
- David Hewitt – remote unit engineer
- Tony Kain – sound engineer for Peabo's band
- Bob Defrin – art direction
- Jim Houghton – photography
- Arthur Johnson – personal assistant for Peabo Bryson
- Fabrice – gowns
- Kevin Board – make-up

== Charts ==
Chart (1981)	Peak position
US Billboard Top LPs & Tape	52
US Billboard Top Soul LPs	10

=== Singles ===
Year	Single	Chart positions
Year	Single	US R&B
1981	"Love Is a Waiting Game "	46
1981	"Make the World Stand Still"	13
