= Straight from the Heart (Peabo Bryson album) =

Studio album by Peabo Bryson
- Released: May 15, 1984
- Studio: Cheshire Sound Studios (Atlanta, Georgia); Orca Studios (Encino, California); Devonshire Sound Studios and Evergreen Studios (Burbank, California); Bill Schnee Studios (North Hollywood, California)
- Genre: Electronic; funk; soul; pop
- Length: 35:05
- Label: Elektra
- Producer: Peabo Bryson; Richard Feldman; Rick Kelly; Michael Masser

Peabo Bryson chronology
Don't Play with Fire (1982)	Straight from the Heart (1984)	Take No Prisoners (1985)

Singles from Straight from the Heart
- 1. "If Ever You're in My Arms Again" Released: April 1984; 2. "Slow Dancin'" Released: July 1984

Straight from the Heart is the tenth studio album by American singer-songwriter Peabo Bryson. It was released in 1984 on Elektra Records, his first of four projects for the label. The album peaked at number 44 on the US Billboard 200 and produced three singles, including his first pop top ten hit "If Ever You're in My Arms Again", which also topped the Adult contemporary chart. Bryson co-produced the record as well as writing five of the eight songs himself and playing keyboards throughout the album.

== Critical reception ==
Professional ratings
Review scores
Source	Rating
AllMusic	4.5/5 stars

In a retrospective review, William Ruhlmann of AllMusic called Straight from the Heart "a good mix of slow and uptempo tunes."

== Track listing ==
Side A
No.	Title	Writer(s)	Producer(s)	Length
1.	"Slow Dancin'"	Peabo Bryson	Bryson	3:55
2.	"If Ever You're in My Arms Again"	Michael Masser; Cynthia Weil; Tom Snow	Masser	4:14
3.	"Straight from the Heart"	Bryson	Bryson	4:35
4.	"There's No Getting Over You (La Theme De Sharon)"	Bryson	Bryson	4:02

Side B
No.	Title	Writer(s)	Producer(s)	Length
5.	"I Get Nervous"	Richard Feldman; Rick Kelly; Larry John McNally	Feldman; Kelly	4:10
6.	"Learning the Ways of Love"	Gerry Goffin; Masser	Bryson	3:12
7.	"Real Deal"	Bryson	Bryson	4:32
8.	"Love Means Forever"	Bryson	Bryson	4:21

== Personnel ==
Musicians

- Peabo Bryson – lead vocals, Memorymoog (1, 3, 7, 8), percussion solo (1), Memorymoog solo (3), backing vocals (3, 7), Yamaha DX7 (4, 7), Oberheim DX (7)
- Myra Walker – acoustic piano (1, 3, 7, 8), Fender Rhodes (1, 3, 7, 8), Oberheim DX (3, 7), backing vocals (3, 7), Yamaha DX7 (4)
- Mark Parrish – Memorymoog (1, 8), Prophet-5 (7)
- Trammell Starks – Memorymoog (1, 3, 4, 7, 8), Yamaha DX7 (4, 7)
- Randy Kerber – acoustic piano (2, 6), Yamaha DX7 (2, 6)
- Tom Snow – Fender Rhodes (2)
- Rick Kelly – keyboards (5)
- John Hauser – electric guitar (1, 3)
- Paul Jackson Jr. – guitars (2, 6)
- Richard Horton – electric guitar (3, 7), acoustic guitar (8)
- Richard Feldman – guitars (5)
- Dwight W. Watkins – Alenbic bass (1, 8), bass (3), Oberheim DX (3), backing vocals (3), flugelhorn (8)
- Neil Stubenhaus – bass (2, 6)
- Louis Johnson – bass (5)
- Andre Robinson – Simmons drums (1, 3, 7, 8)
- Carlos Vega – drums (2, 6)
- John Robinson – drums (5)
- Charles Bryson – percussion (1)
- Michael Fisher – percussion (5)
- Ron Dover – tenor saxophone (3, 8), soprano saxophone (8), flute (8)
- James Bowling – flute (8)
- Richard Marx – backing vocals (2, 6)
- Deborah Thomas – backing vocals (2, 6)
- Lynn Davis – backing vocals (5)
- Josie James – backing vocals (5)
- Marcy Levy – backing vocals (5)
- Samuel T. Dukes – backing vocals (7)

Music arrangements

- Peabo Bryson – arrangements (1, 3, 4, 7, 8)
- Michael Masser – rhythm track arrangements (2, 6)
- Gene Page – rhythm track arrangements (2, 6)
- Lee Holdridge – string arrangements and conductor (2, 6)

Production

- Peabo Bryson – producer (1, 3, 4, 7, 8)
- Dwight W. Watkins – assistant producer (1, 3, 4, 7, 8)
- Michael Masser – producer (2, 6)
- Richard Feldman – producer (5)
- Rick Kelly – producer (5)
- Bobby Sanders – session coordinator (1, 3, 4, 7, 8)
- HSU – art direction
- Beverly Parker – photography
- David Franklin & Associates – management
- Ed Howard – management
- Skip Williams – management

Technical credits

- Doug Sax – mastering at The Mastering Lab (Hollywood, California)
- Russ Fowler – engineer (1, 3, 4, 7, 8), mixing (1, 3, 4, 7, 8), remixing (5)
- Peabo Bryson – mixing (1, 3, 4, 7, 8), remixing (5)
- Dwight W. Watkins – mixing (1, 3, 4, 7, 8), remixing (5)
- Michael Mancini – engineer (2, 6)
- Rick Ricco – string engineer (2, 6)
- Bill Schnee – mixing (2, 6)
- Richard Feldman – engineer (5)
- Kevin Reach – engineer (5)
- Don M. Radick – assistant engineer (1, 3, 4, 7, 8)
- Dean – assistant engineer (2, 6)

== Charts ==
Chart (1984)	Peak position
New Zealand Albums (RMNZ)	47
US Billboard 200	44
US Top R&B/Hip-Hop Albums (Billboard)	12

== In popular culture ==
"If Ever You're in My Arms Again" was used as a love theme for the Kelly Capwell and Joe Perkins characters on the daytime serial Santa Barbara. "Learning the Ways of Love" was used for various characters on the daytime serial Days of Our Lives in the mid-1980s.
