= Michael Masser =

American songwriter, composer and producer of popular music (1941–2015)

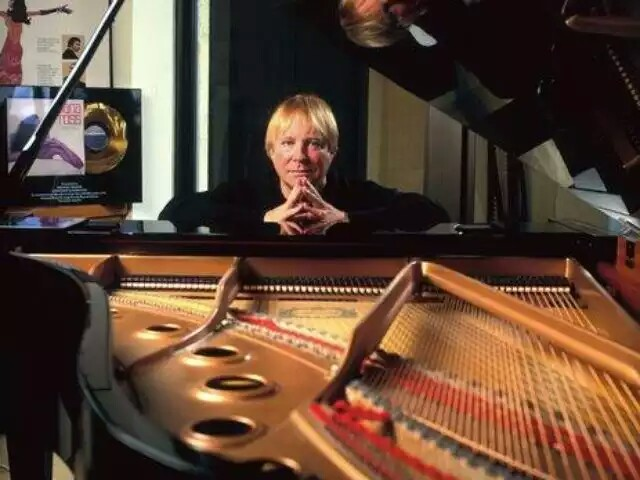
- Born: Michael Masser; March 24, 1941; Chicago, Illinois, United States
- Died: July 9, 2015 (aged 74); Rancho Mirage, California, United States
- Spouse: Ogniana Drandiyska
- Children: 3

Michael William Masser (March 24, 1941 – July 9, 2015) was an American songwriter, composer and producer of popular music. His first major hit was "Touch Me in the Morning" for Diana Ross, and he co-wrote several hit songs for Whitney Houston, including "Saving All My Love for You" and "Greatest Love of All".

== Early life ==
Born to a Jewish family in Chicago to Ester Huff and William Masser, he attended the University of Illinois College of Law. He became a stockbroker, but left to pursue his interest in music.

== Career ==
Masser's first major composition hit, co-written with Ron Miller, was "Touch Me in the Morning", recorded by Diana Ross. He co-wrote several other hit songs in the 1970s and 1980s, including four made famous by Whitney Houston, "Didn't We Almost Have It All", "Saving All My Love for You", "All at Once" and "Greatest Love of All", originally recorded as "The Greatest Love of All" by George Benson for the 1977 film The Greatest.

Other Masser's songs by Benson are "In Your Eyes" (George Benson, Jeffrey Osborne, Regine Velasquez), "Nothing's Gonna Change My Love for You" (George Benson, Glenn Medeiros) and "You Are the Love of My Life" (George Benson and Roberta Flack). His hit songs by other artists include "Hold Me" (Teddy Pendergrass and Whitney Houston), "Tonight, I Celebrate My Love" (Roberta Flack and Peabo Bryson), "If Ever You're in My Arms Again" (Peabo Bryson), "Miss You Like Crazy" (Natalie Cole) and "Someone That I Used To Love" (Natalie Cole), "So Sad the Song" (Teddy Pendergrass, Gladys Knight), and "It's My Turn" and "Last Time I Saw Him" (Diana Ross). A country cover of "Last Time I Saw Him" by Dottie West also became a hit, peaking at #8 on the country charts.

Masser was nominated for an Academy Award in 1976 for Best Music, Original Song, for "Theme from Mahogany (Do You Know Where You're Going To)," which he wrote with Gerry Goffin. The song had actually been first recorded (also in 1975) by fellow Motown labelmate Thelma Houston as a planned single but was pulled before release. Diana Ross' version was released as the theme song for her 1975 film, Mahogany. Among the many recordings that Masser produced are Barbra Streisand's "Someone That I Used to Love" (originally a hit for Natalie Cole) and the duet by Judy Collins and T. G. Sheppard, "Home Again". Over the course of his career, more than 110 recordings of his songs were released.

In 2002, a Golden Palm Star on the Palm Springs, California, Walk of Stars was dedicated to him. Masser was inducted into the Songwriters Hall of Fame in 2007.

== Personal life ==
Masser and his wife, the former Ogniana Drandiyska, lived in Rancho Mirage, California.

On July 9, 2015, Masser died at the age of 74 at his home in Rancho Mirage.

== Compositions ==
Song	Artist/Album/Label/Year	Writers
"Saving All My Love For You"	Whitney Houston, Whitney Houston, Arista 1985	Michael Masser/Gerry Goffin
"The Greatest Love Of All" (acoustic piano version)	Whitney Houston, Whitney Houston, Arista 1986	Michael Masser/Linda Creed
"The Greatest Love Of All" (electric piano version – single mix)	Whitney Houston, Whitney Houston, Arista 1986 (2nd pressings)	Michael Masser/Linda Creed
"All At Once"	Whitney Houston, Whitney Houston, Arista 1986	Michael Masser/Jeffrey Osborne
"Didn't We Almost Have It All"	Whitney Houston, Whitney, Arista 1987	Michael Masser/Will Jennings
"You're Still My Man"	Whitney Houston, Whitney, Arista 1987	Michael Masser/Gerry Goffin
"After We Make Love"	Whitney Houston, I'm Your Baby Tonight, Arista 1991	Michael Masser/Gerry Goffin
"Hold Me"	Whitney Houston & Teddy Pendergrass, Whitney Houston, Arista 1984	Michael Masser/Linda Creed
"Some Changes Are For Good"	Dionne Warwick, Hot! Live and Otherwise, Arista 1981	Michael Masser/Carole Bayer Sager
"There's A Long Road Ahead Of Us"	Dionne Warwick, Hot! Live and Otherwise, Arista 1981	Michael Masser/Gerry Goffin
"Now We're Starting Over Again"	Dionne Warwick, Hot! Live and Otherwise, Arista 1981	Michael Masser/Gerry Goffin
"This Time Is Ours"	Dionne Warwick, "Some Changes are for Good" (B-side) – later released on No Night So Long (CD), Arista 1981	Michael Masser/Gerry Goffin
"Touch Me In The Morning"	Diana Ross, Touch Me In The Morning, Motown 1973	Michael Masser/Ron Miller
"Last Time I Saw Him"	Diana Ross, Last Time I Saw Him, Motown 1974	Michael Masser/Pam Sawyer
"No One's Gonna Be a Fool Forever"	Diana Ross, Last Time I Saw Him, Motown 1975	Michael Masser/Pam Sawyer
"Sorry Doesn't Always Make It Right"	Diana Ross, single 1975 & Ross album 1978, Motown	Michael Masser/Pam Sawyer
"Together"	Diana Ross, single 1975 & Ross album 1978, Motown	Michael Masser/Pam Sawyer
"Do You Know Where You're Going To (Theme From Mahogany)"	Diana Ross, Mahogany, Motown 1975	Michael Masser/Gerry Goffin
"I Thought It Took a Little Time (But Today I Fell in Love)"	Diana Ross, Diana Ross, Motown 1976	Michael Masser/Pam Sawyer
"After You"	Diana Ross, Diana Ross, Motown 1976	Michael Masser/Gerry Goffin
"To Love Again"	Diana Ross, To Love Again, Motown 1978	Michael Masser/Gerry Goffin
"It's My Turn"	Diana Ross, To Love Again, It's My Turn (soundtrack), Motown 1980	Michael Masser/Carole Bayer Sager
"Stay With Me"	Diana Ross, To Love Again, Motown 1981	Michael Masser/Gerry Goffin
"One More Chance"	Diana Ross, To Love Again, Motown 1981	Michael Masser/Gerry Goffin
"Crying My Heart Out For You"	Diana Ross, To Love Again, Motown 1981	Michael Masser/Allee Willis
"In Your Arms"	Diana Ross, Silk Electric, RCA 1983	Michael Masser/Linda Creed
"First You Have to Say You Love Me"	Neil Diamond, Heartlight, Columbia 1982	Michael Masser/Neil Diamond
"Can't Stop Thinking About You"	Stacy Lattisaw, I'm Not The Same Girl, Cotillion 1985	Michael Masser/Linda Creed
"Coming Alive"	Stacy Lattisaw, I'm Not The Same Girl, Cotillion 1985	Michael Masser/Gerry Goffin
"Now We're Starting Over Again"	Stacy Lattisaw, I'm Not The Same Girl, Cotillion 1985	Michael Masser/Gerry Goffin
"He's Just Not You"	Stacy Lattisaw, I'm Not The Same Gir;, Cotillion 1985	Michael Masser/Randy Goodrum
"I'm Not The Same Girl"	Stacy Lattisaw, I'm Not The Same Girl, Cotillion 1985	Michael Masser/Randy Goodrum
"Toughen Up"	Stacy Lattisaw, I'm Not The Same Girl, Cotillion 1985	Michael Masser/Randy Goodrum
"Together"	Stacy Lattisaw, I'm Not The Same Girl, Cotillion 1985	Michael Masser/Pam Sawyer
"I Thought It Took a Little Time"	Stacy Lattisaw, I'm Not The Same Girl, Cotillion 1985	Michael Masser/Pam Sawyer
"Nothing's Gonna Change My Love for You"	Glenn Medeiros, Glenn Medeiros, Amherst 1987	Michael Masser/Gerry Goffin
"A Long and Lasting Love"	Glenn Medeiros, Not Me, Amherst 1989	Michael Masser/Gerry Goffin (verses)/Dan Hill (chorus)
"The Greatest Love of All"	George Benson, The Greatest (soundtrack), Arista 1977	Michael Masser/Linda Creed
"I Always Knew I Had It in Me"	George Benson, The Greatest (soundtrack), Arista 1977	Michael Masser/Gerry Goffin
"In Your Eyes"	George Benson, In Your Eyes, Warner Brothers 1983	Michael Masser/Dan Hill
"Nothing's Gonna Change My Love For You"	George Benson, 20/20, Warner Brothers 1985	Michael Masser/Gerry Goffin
"You Are The Love Of My Life"	George Benson & Roberta Flack, 20/20, Warner Brothers 1985	Michael Masser/Linda Creed
"Ali's Theme (Instrumental)"	Michael Masser, The Greatest (soundtrack), Arista 1977	Michael Masser
"After You"	Roberta Flack, Blue Lights In The Basement, Atlantic 1978	Michael Masser/Gerry Goffin
"Independent Man"	Roberta Flack, Roberta Flack, Atlantic 1978	Michael Masser/Gerry Goffin
"Stay With Me"	Roberta Flack, Roberta Flack Featuring Donny Hathaway, Atlantic 1979	Michael Masser/Gerry Goffin
"Tonight, I Celebrate My Love"	Peabo Bryson & Roberta Flack, Born to Love, EMI 1983	Michael Masser/Gerry Goffin
"Comin' Alive"	Peabo Bryson & Roberta Flack, Born to Love, EMI 1983	Michael Masser/Gerry Goffin
"If Ever You're in My Arms Again"	Peabo Bryson, Straight from the Heart, Elektra 1984	Michael Masser/Tom Snow/Cynthia Weil
"Learning The Ways Of Love"	Peabo Bryson, Straight from the Heart, Elektra 1984	Michael Masser/Gerry Goffin
"You're My Only Girl (Jenny)"	Barry Manilow, Greatest Hits Vol. 2, Arista 1989	Michael Masser/Barry Manilow/John Bettis
"Nobody Wants To Be Alone"	Crystal Gayle, Nobody Wants to Be Alone, Warner Brothers 1985	Michael Masser/Rhonda Fleming
"A Long And Lasting Love"	Crystal Gayle, Nobody Wants to Be Alone, Warner Brothers 1985	Michael Masser/Gerry Goffin
"You Were There for Me"	Crystal Gayle, Nobody Wants to Be Alone, Warner Brothers 1985	Michael Masser/Cynthia Weil
"A New Way To Say I Love You"	Crystal Gayle, Nobody Wants to Be Alone, Warner Brothers 1985	Michael Masser/Gerry Goffin
"Crazy"	Gene Wilder, Stir Crazy (soundtrack), Posse Records 1981	Michael Masser/Randy Goodrum
"Love"	Randy Goodrum, Stir Crazy (soundtrack), Posse Records, 1981	Michael Masser/Randy Goodrum
"Nothing Can Stop Us Now"	Kiki Dee, Stir Crazy (soundtrack), Posse Records 1981	Michael Masser/Randy Goodrum
"Hold Me"	Teddy Pendergrass & Whitney Houston, Love Language, Elektra/Asylum 1984	Michael Masser/Linda Creed
"In My Time"	Teddy Pendergrass, Love Language, Elektra/Asylum 1984	Michael Masser/Cynthia Weil
"So Sad The Song"	Teddy Pendergrass, Love Language, Elektra/Asylum 1984	Michael Masser/Gerry Goffin
"Hot Love"	Teddy Pendergrass, Love Language, Elektra/Asylum 1984	Michael Masser/R. Parker, Jr/Linda Creed
"Stay With Me"	Teddy Pendergrass, Love Language, Elektra/Asylum 1984	Michael Masser/Gerry Goffin
"Love"	Teddy Pendergrass, Love Language, Elektra/Asylum 1984	Michael Masser/Randy Goodrum
"This Time Is Ours"	Teddy Pendergrass, Love Language, Elektra/Asylum 1984	Michael Masser/Gerry Goffin
"In Your Eyes"	Jeffrey Osborne, So Emotional, A&M Records 1987	Michael Masser/Dan Hill
"In Your Eyes"	Dan Hill, Love in the Shadows, Polygram Records 1983	Michael Masser/Dan Hill
"In Your Eyes"	Nolans, Girls Just Wanna Have Fun, Teichiku Records 1991	Michael Masser/Dan Hill
"Piano Man"	Thelma Houston, A-side single release (later on Motown Superstar Series LP), Mowest/Motown 1973	Michael Masser/K. L. Dunham
"I'm Just A Part Of Yesterday"	Thelma Houston, B-side single release (later on Best of Thelma Houston LP), Mowest/Motown 1973	Michael Masser/Pam Sawyer
"No One's Gonna Be A Fool Forever"	Thelma Houston, A-side single release (later on Best of Thelma Houston LP), Mowest/Motown 1972	Michael Masser/Pam Sawyer
"Do You Know Where You're Going To"	Thelma Houston, A-side single release [Australia only] Motown 1973 (later on Any Way You Want It expanded CD), SouMusic Records 2016	Michael Masser/Gerry Goffin
"Together"	Thelma Houston, recorded 1973 but originally unreleased (later on Any Way You Want It expanded CD) SoulMusic Records 2016	Michael Masser/Gerry Goffin
"Your Eyes"	Thelma Houston, The Devil in Me, Motown 1977	Michael Masser/Pam Sawyer
"Little Bit Of Heaven And A Little Bit Of Hell"	Thelma Houston, Reachin' All Around, Motown 1982	Michael Masser/Deirdre Meehan
"Someone That I Used to Love"	Natalie Cole, Don't Look Back, Capitol 1980	Michael Masser/Gerry Goffin
"Miss You Like Crazy"	Natalie Cole, Good To Be Back, EMI 1989	Michael Masser/Gerry Goffin/Preston Glass
"Starting Over Again"	Natalie Cole, Good To Be Back, EMI 1989	Michael Masser/Gerry Goffin
"No More Blue Christmas'"	Natalie Cole, single release, EMI 1990	Michael Masser/Gerry Goffin
"Home Again"	Judy Collins & T. G. Sheppard, Home Again, Elektra 1984	Michael Masser/Gerry Goffin
"A Long And Lasting Love"	Jane Olivor, Best Side of Goodbye, Columbia 1980	Michael Masser/Gerry Goffin
"The Greatest Love Of All"	Jane Olivor, Best Side of Goodbye, Columbia 1980	Michael Masser/Linda Creed
"To Love Again"	Jane Olivor, Best Side of Goodbye, Columbia 1980	Michael Masser/Gerry Goffin
"Last Time I Saw Him"	Dottie West, Essential, RCA 1974	Michael Masser/Pam Sawyer
"So Sad The Song"	Gladys Knight & the Pips, Pipe Dreams, Buddah 1976	Michael Masser/Gerry Goffin
"Sorry Doesn't Always Make It Right"	Gladys Knight & The Pips, The One And Only, Buddah 1977	Michael Masser/Pam Sawyer
"Someone To Love"	Phyllis Hyman, Forever with You, Philadelphia International 1998	Michael Masser/Linda Creed
"Theme From Mahogany (Do You Know Where You're Going To)"	Mariah Carey, #1s (International Editions), Columbia 1998	Michael Masser/Gerry Goffin
"Stay With Me"	Marilyn McCoo & Billy Davis Jr., Marilyn & Billy, Columbia 1980	Michael Masser/Gerry Goffin
"Saving All My Love For You"	Marilyn McCoo & Billy Davis Jr., Marilyn & Billy, Columbia 1980	Michael Masser/Gerry Goffin
"I Thought It Took a Little Time (But Today I Fell in Love)"	Marilyn McCoo & Billy Davis Jr., Marilyn & Billy, Columbia 1980	Michael Masser/Pam Sawyer
"A Long And Lasting Love"	Billy Preston & Syreeta, Billy Preston & Syreeta, Motown 1981	Michael Masser/Gerry Goffin
"A New Way To Say I Love You"	Billy Preston & Syreeta, Billy Preston & Syreeta, Motown 1981	Michael Masser/Gerry Goffin
"Love"	Billy Preston & Syreeta, Billy Preston & Syreeta, Motown 1981	Michael Masser/Randy Goodrum
"What We Did for Love"	Billy Preston & Syreeta, Billy Preston & Syreeta, Motown 1981	Michael Masser/Randy Goodrum
"Turn Around to Me"	Fifth Dimension, Individually & Collectively, Bell 1972	Michael Masser/Gerry Goffin
"Abrazame" (Spanish version of "Hold Me")	Jose Feliciano & Lani Hall, Como Tu Quieras, RCA Victor 1984	Michael Masser/Linda Creed
"Do You Know Where You're Going To"	Jennifer Lopez, On the 6 (International Version), Work 1999	Michael Masser/Gerry Goffin
"Do You Know Where You're Going To"	Lara Fabian, Every Woman in Me, Polydor 2009	Michael Masser/Gerry Goffin
"The Greatest Love Of All"	Shirley Bassey, The Magic Is You, United Artists 1979	Michael Masser/Linda Creed
"I Always Knew I Had It in Me"	Johnny Mathis, Hold Me, Thrill Me, Kiss Me, Columbia 1977	Michael Masser/Gerry Goffin
"It's My Turn"	Aretha Franklin, Love All The Hurt Away, Arista 1981	Michael Masser/Carole Bayer Sager
"Nothing's Gonna Change My Love For You"	Engelbert Humperdinck, Remember – I Love You, White Records 1987	Michael Masser/Gerry Goffin
"Nothing's Gonna Change My Love For You"	Westlife, Love Album (Japanese Bonus Edition), Sony/BMG (Japan) 2006	Michael Masser/Gerry Goffin
"Tonight I Celebrate My Love"	Amy Sky, With This Kiss, EMI 2003	Michael Masser/Gerry Goffin
"Tonight I Celebrate My Love"	Gloria Loring, By Request, Silk Purse 2007	Michael Masser/Gerry Goffin
"Tonight I Celebrate My Love"	Perry Como, Today, RCA 1987	Michael Masser/Gerry Goffin
"Touch Me In The Morning"	Marlena Shaw, Take a Bite, Columbia 1979	Michael Masser/Ron Miller
"Touch Me In The Morning"	Andy Williams, The Way We Were, Columbia 1974	Michael Masser/Ron Miller
"You Are The Love Of My Life"	Jack Jones, I Am a Singer, USA Music Group 1987	Michael Masser/Gerry Goffin
"Someone That I Used To Love"	Barbra Streisand, A Collection: Greatest Hits & More, Columbia 1989	Michael Masser/Gerry Goffin
"Halfway Through The Night"	Barbra Streisand, (unreleased), Columbia 1989	Michael Masser/Cynthia Weil
"Halfway Through The Night"	Whitney Houston, (unreleased), Arista 1990	Michael Masser/Cynthia Weil
"Far Enough"	Whitney Houston, I Wanna Dance with Somebody (The Movie: Whitney New, Classic and Reimagined), RCA 2022	Michael Masser/Gerry Goffin/Leon Ware
"I Thought It Took a Little Time"	Gloria Estefan, Gloria's 70's Moment Medley single (part of medley), Epic 1998	Michael Masser/Pam Sawyer
