= If Ever You're in My Arms Again =

Single by Peabo Bryson

from the album Straight from the Heart
- B-side: "There's No Getting Over You"
- Released: April 1984
- Recorded: 1983
- Genre: R&B
- Length: 4:12 (album version); 4:02 (single version)
- Label: Elektra
- Songwriters: Cynthia Weil; Michael Masser; Tom Snow
- Producer: Michael Masser

Peabo Bryson singles chronology
"I Just Came Here to Dance (with Roberta Flack)" (1984)	"If Ever You're in My Arms Again" (1984)	"Slow Dancin'" (1984)

Audio
- "If Ever You're in My Arms Again" on YouTube

"If Ever You're in My Arms Again" is a 1984 song recorded by American contemporary R&B singer Peabo Bryson. Released as a single from his album Straight from the Heart, the single peaked at number 6 on the R&B chart and was Bryson's first Top 10 single on the Billboard Hot 100 chart, where it peaked at number 10 during the summer of 1984. It also spent four weeks at number 1 on the adult contemporary chart.

== Personnel ==
- Peabo Bryson – lead vocals
- Randy Kerber – acoustic piano, Yamaha DX7
- Paul Jackson, Jr. – guitars
- Neil Stubenhaus – bass guitar
- Carlos Vega – drums
- Lee Holdridge – string arrangements and conductor
- Michael Masser – rhythm track arrangements
- Gene Page – rhythm track arrangements
- Richard Marx – backing vocals
- Deborah Thomas – backing vocals

== Charts ==
=== Weekly charts ===
Weekly chart performance for "If Ever You're in My Arms Again"
Chart (1984)	Peak position
Australia (Kent Music Report)	20
Canada RPM Top Singles	6
Canada RPM Adult Contemporary	1
New Zealand (Recorded Music NZ)	18
US Billboard Hot 100	10
US Adult Contemporary (Billboard)	1
US Hot R&B/Hip-Hop Songs (Billboard)	6

Chart (2024)	Peak position
Philippines Hot 100 (Billboard Philippines)	53

=== Year-end charts ===
Year-end chart performance for "If Ever You're in My Arms Again"
Chart (1984)	Position
Canada	46
US Top Pop Singles (Billboard)	47
US Adult Contemporary (Billboard)	1

== In popular culture ==
The song was used as a love theme for the Kelly Capwell and Joe Perkins characters on the daytime serial Santa Barbara.

== Cover versions ==
Toni Gonzaga and Sam Milby's 2008 version as the soundtrack of My Big Love.

== See also ==
- List of Hot Adult Contemporary number ones of 1984
