= Peabo Bryson =

American singer (1951–2026)

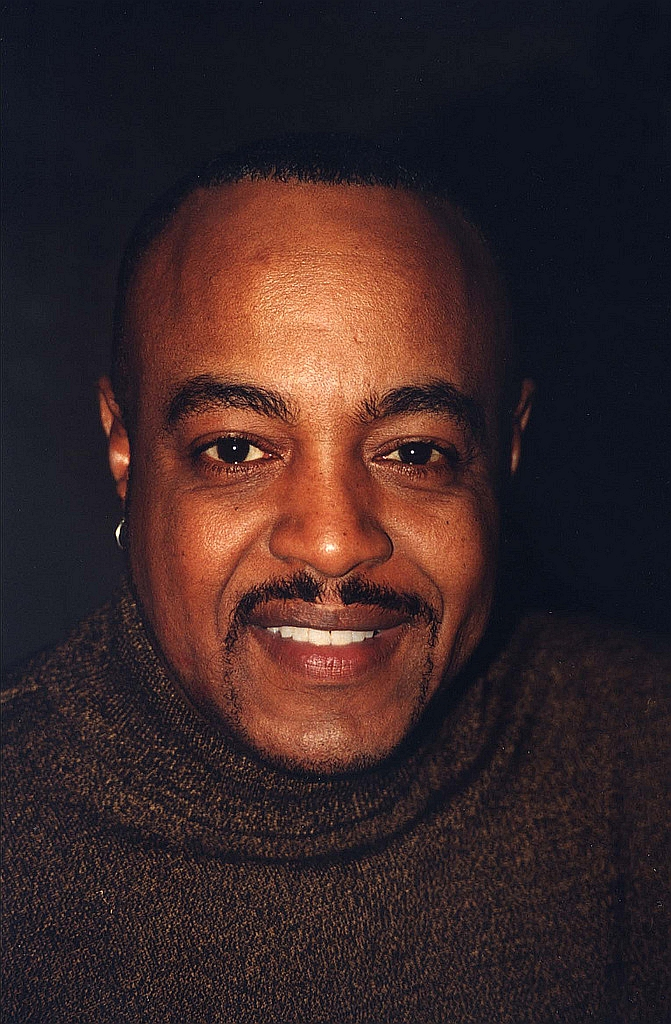
- Bryson in 2000
- Born: Robert Peapo Bryson; April 13, 1951; Greenville, South Carolina, U.S.
- Died: June 2, 2026 (aged 75); Marietta, Georgia, U.S.
- Other names: "Peabo", a 'riff on his middle name'
- Occupations: Musician; singer; songwriter; dancer; record producer
- Years active: 1965–2026
- Spouse: Tanya Boniface (m. 2010)
- Children: 2
- Musical career
- Genres: R&B; soul; smooth jazz
- Instruments: Vocals; keyboards; guitar
- Labels: Bullet / Bang; Capitol; Elektra; Columbia; Private Music; Peak; Perspective; Walt Disney

Robert Lee "Peabo" Bryson (/ˈpiːboʊ/ PEE-boh; born Robert Peapo Bryson April 13, 1951 – June 2, 2026) was an American singer and songwriter. After collaborating with singers Luther Vandross and Cissy Houston on his debut album Peabo (1976), he signed to Capitol Records and released the 1978 albums Reaching for the Sky and Crosswinds, which were certified Gold by the Recording Industry Association of America (RIAA). He later released the collaborative projects We're the Best of Friends (1979) with Natalie Cole and Born to Love (1983) with Roberta Flack, the latter of which included the hit single "Tonight, I Celebrate My Love".

In 1984, he signed to Elektra Records and released the single "If Ever You're in My Arms Again", which spent several weeks atop the adult contemporary chart. During this period, he earned several top ten albums on the U.S. Billboard R&B albums chart, with Can You Stop the Rain (1991) topping the chart. Bryson also contributed to several Disney animated feature soundtracks collaborating with Celine Dion on "Beauty and the Beast", and Regina Belle on "A Whole New World", with the latter becoming the first song from an animated feature film to top the Billboard Hot 100. Bryson was a winner of two Grammy Awards, both attributed to his Disney duets.

== Early life ==
Born as Robert Peapo Bryson in Greenville, South Carolina, on April 13, 1951, he spent much of his childhood on his grandfather's farm in Mauldin, South Carolina. Bryson's love for music stemmed from his mother, who often took the family to concerts of well-known black artists of the time.

== Career ==
Bryson marked his professional debut at the age of 14, singing backup for Al Freeman and the Upsetters, a local Greenville group. It was Freeman's difficulty in pronouncing Bryson's French West-Indian name, Peapo, that led Bryson to perform as Peabo. Two years later, he left home to tour the Chitlin' Circuit with another local band, Moses Dillard and the Tex-Town Display.

Bryson's first break came during a recording session at Atlanta's Bang Records. Although Bang was not impressed with Dillard's band, the young backup singer caught the ear of the label's general manager, Eddie Biscoe. Biscoe signed Bryson to a contract as a writer, producer, and arranger and encouraged Bryson to perform his own songs. For several years, Bryson worked with hometown bands and wrote and produced for Bang.

In 1976, he launched his own recording career with "Underground Music" on the Bang label. His first album, Peabo, followed shortly thereafter. Although only a regional success, Bryson signed to Capitol Records in 1977.

Bryson's greatest solo hits include 1977's "Feel the Fire" and "Reaching for the Sky", 1978's "I'm So into You" and "Crosswinds", 1982's "Let the Feeling Flow", 1984's "If Ever You're in My Arms Again" (his first Top 10 pop single, at No. 10 in the U.S.), 1989's "Show and Tell", and the 1991 hit "Can You Stop the Rain". In 1985, he appeared on the soap opera One Life to Live to sing a lyrical version of its theme song. Bryson's vocals were added to the regular theme song in 1986 and his voice was heard daily until 1992. He recorded the successful album of romantic love duets with Roberta Flack (Born to Love) in 1983.

In 1988, Bryson recorded the duet "For You and I" with Angela Bofill. In partnership with Regina Belle, Bryson recorded two hit duets: "Without You", the love theme from the comedy film Leonard Part 6, recorded in 1987, and "A Whole New World", the main theme of the Disney's animated feature film Aladdin, recorded in 1992. Bryson and Belle recorded four duets over the years: "Without You" (in 1987), "I Can't Imagine" (in 1991), "A Whole New World" (in 1992), and "Total Praise" (in 2009).

He won two Grammy Awards: in 1992 for his performance of the song "Beauty and the Beast" with Celine Dion and in 1993 for "A Whole New World" with Regina Belle.

In early 1998, Bryson contributed his voice to Barney's Great Adventure: An Original Motion Picture Musical Soundtrack, with the song "Dream (Twinken's Tune)".

Bryson performed in theater and operatic productions, most notably the tenor role of "Sportin' Life" in the Michigan Opera Theater of Detroit's version of Porgy and Bess. His tax problems caught up with him on August 21, 2003, when the U.S. Internal Revenue Service seized property from his home in Atlanta, Georgia. He is reported to have owed $1.2 million in taxes dating back to 1984. The IRS auctioned many of his possessions, including both Grammy Awards, electronic equipment, his grand piano, and multiple pairs of shoes. However, his Grammy for "A Whole New World (Aladdin's Theme)" was purchased by a close friend of the family who vowed to return it to Bryson.

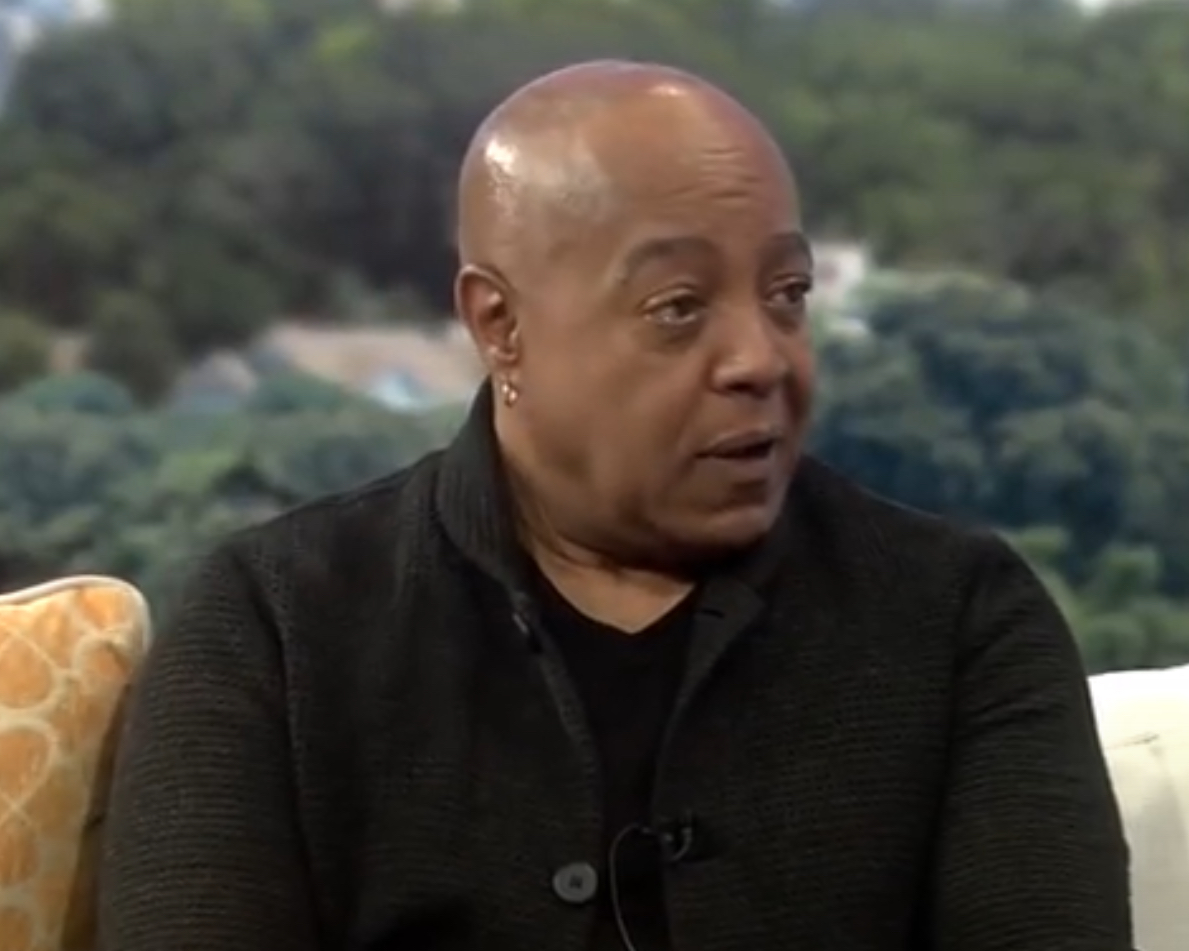
Bryson in 2018

In 2000 he participated in the International competition in the 41th International Festival of the Song of Viña del Mar where he won the international competition representing France, earning the Gaviota (Givet) of Gold in that contest. In 2001 he was invited to the Festival as a judge.

In 2002, Bryson's "Beauty and the Beast" music video was included on the platinum and Blu-ray edition of Beauty and the Beast. His "A Whole New World" music video was included on the platinum edition DVD release of Aladdin. Bryson's CD Missing You was released on October 2, 2007, on Peak Records, a division of Concord Music Group.

September 4, 2016, was declared Peabo Bryson Day in Charleston and North Charleston, South Carolina, during the Lowcountry Jazz Festival.

In 2018, Bryson released his new album Stand for Love, which was produced by Jimmy Jam and Terry Lewis. The project was released on Jam & Lewis's newly reactivated label, Perspective Records.

== Personal life ==
Bryson was married in 2010 to Tanya Boniface, a singer and member of English R&B group The 411. On December 31, 2017, they had a son, who would occasionally join his father on stage. He also has a daughter from a previous relationship, along with three grandchildren.

Prior to his marriage, Bryson was engaged several times: first to Juanita Leonard, the former wife of boxer Sugar Ray Leonard, then to Angela Thigpen, a former Miss Virginia Teen USA and later a model and actress.

=== Health and death ===
On April 29, 2019, it was reported that Bryson had suffered a heart attack, and had been taken to an Atlanta hospital, where he was said to be in a stable condition. He made a full recovery.

On May 31, 2026, CBS News reported that Bryson had suffered a stroke. He died two days later, on June 2, at a hospital in Marietta, Georgia, at the age of 75.

== Discography ==
Studio albums

- Peabo (1976)
- Reaching for the Sky (1977)
- Crosswinds (1978)
- Paradise (1980)
- Turn the Hands of Time (1981)
- I Am Love (1981)
- Don't Play with Fire (1982)
- Straight from the Heart (1984)
- Take No Prisoners (1985)
- Quiet Storm (1986)
- Positive (1988)
- All My Love (1989)
- Can You Stop the Rain (1991)
- Through the Fire (1994)
- Peace on Earth (1997)
- Unconditional Love (1999)
- Missing You (2007)
- Stand for Love (2018)
- Grace (2026)

Collaboration albums

- We're the Best of Friends with (Natalie Cole) (1979)
- Live & More with (Roberta Flack) (1980)
- Born to Love with (Roberta Flack) (1983)

== Awards and nominations ==
=== Daytime Emmy Awards ===
Year	Category	Work	Result
1993	Best Original Song	"I Found Love" (with Earl Rose)	Nominated

=== Grammy Awards ===
Year	Category	Work	Result
1992	Best R&B Vocal Performance, Male	"Can You Stop the Rain"	Nominated
1993	Best R&B Vocal Performance, Male	"Lost in the Night"	Nominated
1993	Record of the Year	"Beauty and the Beast" (with Celine Dion)	Nominated
1993	Best Pop Performance by a Duo or Group with Vocals	"Beauty and the Beast" (with Celine Dion)	Won
1994	Best Pop Performance by a Duo or Group with Vocals	"A Whole New World" (with Regina Belle)	Won
1994	Record of the Year	"A Whole New World" (with Regina Belle)	Nominated
2000	Best Traditional R&B Performance	Unconditional Love	Nominated
2000	Best Male R&B Vocal Performance	"Did You Ever Know"	Nominated

=== NAACP Image Awards ===
Year	Category	Work	Result
1989	Outstanding Male Artist	Himself	Nominated
1992	Outstanding Male Artist	Himself	Nominated
