= Roberta Flack (album) =

Studio album by Roberta Flack
- Released: August 7, 1978
- Recorded: April ("If Ever I See You Again", "Come Share My Love", "When It's Over") and May 1978
- Length: 36:49
- Label: Atlantic
- Producer: Joe Brooks; Joe Ferla; Rubina Flake

Roberta Flack chronology
Blue Lights in the Basement (1977)	Roberta Flack (1978)	Roberta Flack Featuring Donny Hathaway (1979)

Singles from Roberta Flack
- 1. "If Ever I See You Again / I'd Like to Be Baby to You" Released: 21 April 1978; 2. "When It's Over / Come Share My Love" Released: 20 October 1978; 3. "You Are Everything / Knowing That We're Made for Each Other" Released: 8 April 1979

Roberta Flack is a 1978 studio album by American singer Roberta Flack. Her eighth album release, including her 1972 Donny Hathaway collaboration, Roberta Flack was the parent album of the Adult Contemporary number one hit "If Ever I See You Again" which also ranked in the Top 40.

== Background ==
Since signing with Atlantic Records in 1968 Flack had overall abided by her original contract's terms of recording an album every two years: however her December 1977 album release Blue Lights in the Basement had been issued thirty-three months subsequent to Flack's precedent album Feel Like Makin' Love and in the spring of 1978 Atlantic Records president Jerry Greenberg insisted that Flack cut a new album to honor her contract, despite Flack's Blue Lights in the Basement album being a current release.

Footnote 1
Flack has stated that she had been sent the demo for "You Light Up My Life" but had not had a chance to listen to it before the Debby Boone recording was made.

Footnote 2
In January 1978 Brooks had helmed Debby Boone's recording of the If Ever I See You Again title song plus four other songs heard in the film, the track "California" being a 1978 single release. Boone's versions of these five songs from the film If Ever I See You Again, including "Come Share My Love" and "When It's Over" as well as the title track, would appear on Boone's July 1978 album release Midstream.

Footnote 3
Brooks had previously offered the If Ever I See You Again numbers to Arista Records president Clive Davis for Barry Manilow to record only to renege after hearing the existing tracks intended for Manilow's upcoming album, which Brooks felt were sub-par and would sink his own compositions (in fact Manilow's 1978 album release Even Now would be a triple platinum seller).

Greenberg was largely motivated by the prospect of having Flack record the theme song from the upcoming film If Ever I See You Again written by Joe Brooks and featured in the film which Brooks produced. Brooks' precedent film production You Light Up My Life had had its theme song via a recording by Debby Boone spend ten weeks at number 1 on the Billboard Hot 100. Although Greenberg had responded warily to Brooks' pitch that Flack record the song "If Ever I See You Again" - plus some other songs heard in the film - for a new album despite Flack's Blue Lights in the Basement album being a current release, Brooks convinced Greenberg that the If Ever I See You Again theme would be "bigger than 'You Light Up My Life'...It will be a monster [hit]". Flack herself would eventually state that "If Ever I See You Again" was "a song I couldn't stand" which Greenberg insisted she record: (Roberta Flack quote:) "I had a very clever lawyer who made a huge money deal for [my recording] that song".

In April 1978 Brooks produced Flack at A&R Recording Studios (NYC) recording session which yielded Flack's recording of the theme from If Ever I See You Again plus two other songs heard in the film: "Come Share My Love" and "When It's Over". Flack recorded six more tracks to complete the album with Greenberg overseeing production at Atlantic Studios. Flack's recording of its theme from If Ever I See You Again was released 21 April 1978, a month prior to the film's premiere.

With the film If Ever I See You Again quickly proving a massive flop, Flack's single was left to fare on its own merit and in July 1978 spent three weeks at #1 on the Easy Listening chart with an eventual ranking as the #8 Easy Listening hit for the year. "If Ever I See You Again" charted at #24 on the Billboard Hot 100, and #37 on the R&B chart.

The projected title of Flack's seventh solo album release had been If Ever I See You Again referencing its lead single:. the single's underperformance was reflected in the album being released with the title Roberta Flack on 7 August 1978. Following the album's October 1978 Billboard 200 peak of #74 - as opposed to the #8 peak of Blue Lights in the Basement - Atlantic issued the two other Joe Brooks tracks on Roberta Flack: "Come Share My Love" and "When It's Over", as a single with the latter as A-side and no mention of the tracks' cinematic provenance: after this single essentially flopped - "When It's Over" reaching #82 on the R&B chart - Atlantic attempted to spur further interest in the album by releasing Flack's remake of the Stylistics' hit "You Are Everything" as a single in April 1979 - a year after the release of the "If Ever I See You Again" single, and the first time a third single had been culled from a Roberta Flack album - without result, the track barely making the R&B chart at #98.

== Track listing ==
Roberta Flack track listing
No.	Title	Writer(s)	Length
1.	"What a Woman Really Means"	Ralph MacDonald; William Salter	4:46
2.	"You Are Everything"	Linda Creed; Thom Bell	4:32
3.	"Independent Man"	Gerry Goffin; Michael Masser	4:52
4.	"If Ever I See You Again"	Joe Brooks	3:34
5.	"And the Feeling's Good"	Charles Fox; Norman Gimbel	3:06
6.	"Knowing That We're Made for Each Other"	Larry Alexander	3:32
7.	"Come Share My Love"	Brooks	3:42
8.	"Baby I Love You So"	Alexander	4:50
9.	"When It's Over"	Brooks	3:28
Total length:			36:49

== Personnel ==
Performers and musicians

- Roberta Flack – vocals, backing vocals, keyboards, arrangements
- Monty Alexander – keyboards
- Ronnie Foster – synthesizers
- Rob Mounsey – keyboards
- Leon Pendarvis – keyboards, arrangements
- Howard Schneider – keyboards
- Harry Whitaker – keyboards
- Hiram Bullock – guitars
- Reggie Lucas – guitars
- Hugh McCracken – guitars
- Jeff Mironov – guitars
- Cliff Morris – guitars
- David Spinozza – guitars
- Brian Allsop – bass guitar
- Basil Fearrington – bass guitar
- Anthony Jackson – bass guitar
- Steve Ferrone – drums
- Steve Gadd – drums
- Howard King – drums, backing vocals
- Gary Mure – drums
- Larry Alexander – percussion, arrangements
- Erroll "Crusher" Bennett – percussion
- David Carey – percussion
- Warren Chiasson – percussion
- James Mtume – percussion
- Angelo DiBraccio – alto saxophone
- Sherry Winston – flute
- Joseph Brooks – arrangements and conductor (4, 7, 9)
- Frank Lloyd – backing vocals
- Lani Groves – backing vocals
- Gwen Guthrie – backing vocals
- Tami Lester Smith – backing vocals
- Yvonne Lewis – backing vocals
- Ullanda McCullough – backing vocals
- Zachery Sanders – backing vocals
- Luther Vandross – backing vocals
- Brenda White – backing vocals

Technical

- Jerry L. Greenberg – executive producer
- Joe Ferla – producer (1–3, 5, 6, 8), engineer (1–3, 5, 6, 8), remixing (1–3, 5, 6, 8)
- Rubina Flake – producer (1–3, 5, 6, 8)
- Joseph Brooks – producer (4, 7, 9)
- Joe Lopes – engineer (1–3, 5, 6, 8)
- Tom Heid – additional engineer (1–3, 5, 6, 8)
- Jim McCurdy – additional engineer (1–3, 5, 6, 8)
- Malcolm Addey – engineer (4, 7, 9)
- Jack Adelman – mastering
- Bob Defrin – art direction, design
- Stewart Bosley – cover concept
- Gazebo Group – cover concept
- Giuseppe Pino – photography

Studios

- Recorded at RCA Studios, The Hit Factory, Atlantic Studios, A & R Recording and Sound Ideas Studios (New York City, New York).
- Mastered at A & R Recording.

== Charts ==
Weekly chart performance for Roberta Flack
Chart (1978)	Peak position
US Billboard 200	74
US Top R&B/Hip-Hop Albums (Billboard)	37

== Certifications ==
Certifications for Roberta Flack
Region	Certification	Certified units/sales
United Kingdom (BPI)	Silver	60,000^{^}
^{^} Shipments figures based on certification alone.
