= If Ever I See You Again =

Single by Roberta Flack

from the album Roberta Flack
- B-side: "I'd Like To Be Baby To You"
- Released: April 1978
- Genre: Soul, R&B
- Length: 3:35
- Label: Atlantic
- Songwriter: Joseph Brooks
- Producer: Joseph Brooks

Roberta Flack singles chronology
"The Closer I Get to You" (1978)	"If Ever I See You Again" (1978)	"When It's Over" (1978)

"If Ever I See You Again" is the title of a 1978 hit single by Roberta Flack. The song was composed by Joseph "Joe" Brooks and served as the title song for the 1978 film If Ever I See You Again, which Brooks directed and also starred in with Shelley Hack as his leading lady. Male vocalist Jamie Carr sang the theme song on the film's soundtrack.

== Background ==
Brooks' directorial debut, You Light Up My Life, had become successful largely on the strength of its title song, which as recorded by Debby Boone had spent ten weeks at #1 on the Billboard Hot 100 in 1977. With Brooks producing, Debby Boone had subsequently recorded the If Ever I See You Again title song plus four other songs heard in the film: "California", "Come Share My Love", "It Was Such a Good Day" and "When It's Over", at the Hollywood recording studio the Record Plant in January 1978, with the track "California" being issued as Boone's follow-up single to "You Light Up My Life" in February 1978 to reach #50 on the Hot 100. Boone's version of the If Ever I See You Again title song, plus the four other songs from the film that she'd recorded, would be included on her July 1978 album release Midstream.

Despite Boone's success with the theme song from You Light Up My Life, Brooks was hoping to place the If Ever I See You Again theme song plus other songs from the film with an established artist. According to his partner Robert K. Lifton, Brooks offered the If Ever I See You Again numbers to Arista Records president Clive Davis for Barry Manilow to record only to renege after hearing the existing tracks intended for Manilow's upcoming album, which Brooks felt were sub-par and would sink his own compositions (in fact Manilow's 1978 album release Even Now would be a triple platinum seller).

Brooks then approached Atlantic Records president Jerry Greenberg with the intent of having the If Ever I See You Again theme song and other songs from the film recorded by Roberta Flack (Flack has stated that she had been offered "You Light Up My Life" prior to the Debby Boone recording: (Roberta Flack quote:)"Some people whose opinions I respect very much suggested I should do it...but the song reminded me of too many other things that I had heard or sung and I just didn't like it [although] I think [for] Debby Boone ['You Light Up My Life'] was perfect". Flack would eventually describe "If Ever I See You Again" as "a song I couldn't stand" that Greenberg insisted she record: (Roberta Flack quote:) "I had a very clever lawyer who made a huge money deal for [my recording] that song": Flack recorded "If Ever I See You Again" at A&R Recording Studios in New York City in a session produced by Brooks which also yielded Flack's versions of "Come Share My Love" and "When It's Over". With a track from Flack's 1977 Blue Lights in the Basement album: "I'd Like To Be Baby To You", as B-side, "If Ever I See You Again" was released as a single on 21 April 1978 - a month before the film's premiere - to debut the Billboard Hot 100 dated 20 May 1978 at #87 (the same chart ranked the Blue Lights in the Basement single: the Donny Hathaway duet "The Closer I Get to You" at its #2 peak for a second and final week).

== Chart performance ==
With the film If Ever I See You Again quickly proving a massive flop, Flack's single was left to fare on its own merit, and did in July 1978 spend three weeks at No. 1 on the Easy Listening chart with an eventual ranking as the #8 Easy Listening hit for the year: however, while reaching the Top 40 on both the Pop-oriented Hot 100 and the R&B chart, "If Ever I See You Again" was not on either chart afforded the impact which had previously been customary for Flack's lead singles, the Hot 100 peak for "If Ever I See You Again" being #24 with its R&B peak being #37. On the pop-oriented singles charts published in both Cashbox and Record World, "If Ever I See You Again" peaked at #38, with the single's peak on the respective magazines' R&B charts being #37 (Cashbox) and #58 (Record World)).

"If Ever I See You Again" was included on the August 1978 album release Roberta Flack - the planned album title of If Ever I See You Again being dropped due to the single's underperformance; that album also including the two other tracks cut with Joe Brooks at A&R Studios: "Come Share My Love" and "When It's Over", the two latter tracks being issued on a single in October 1978 with the A-side "When It's Over" reaching #82 on the R&B chart.

From 1979 Flack would tend to rank on the R&B chart as opposed to the Hot 100, her only solo Hot 100 entry subsequent to "If Ever I See You Again" being another movie theme song: "Making Love", which peaked at #13 in 1982. However Flack did reach the Top 20 of the Hot 100 with two duets: "Tonight, I Celebrate My Love" with Peabo Bryson (#16/ 1983) and "Set the Night to Music" with Maxi Priest (#6/ 1991).

== See also ==
- List of number-one adult contemporary singles of 1978 (U.S.)
