= In My Life (musical) =

2005 musical by Joseph Brooks

- The Broadway poster as printed on its Playbill cover
- Music: Joseph Brooks
- Lyrics: Joseph Brooks
- Book: Joseph Brooks
- Premiere: October 20, 2005: Music Box Theatre
- Productions: 2005 Broadway

In My Life was a 2005 Broadway musical with music, lyrics, and book by Joseph Brooks.

Described by Playbill as being "generally regarded" to be "one of the strangest shows ever to have graced a Broadway stage", it told the story of a romance between a journalist with obsessive–compulsive disorder (OCD) and a singer-songwriter with Tourette's syndrome and later a brain tumor; as they fall in love, they are observed by an angel in Heaven who decides that their story would make a great "reality opera". Also involved in the tale are the songwriter's dead mother and sister, as well as God himself.

Written entirely by Brooks, the show opened on Broadway on October 20, 2005, in a production also directed by Brooks; after receiving uniformly negative reviews, it closed on December 11, 2005, after 61 performances and 23 previews. No cast recording was made of the show's songs, and the libretto has never been published.

== Background ==
In My Life was originated by Joseph Brooks, a composer, writer and director best known for writing the Debby Boone song "You Light Up My Life", the most successful single of the 1970s according to Billboard magazine, and for his various advertising jingles. He started to write the show after having taken a ten-year break from writing to raise his young son; he wanted to "do something that was not from any other source, like an old film or an old play – I wanted something that was totally new." In terms of stage experience, Brooks had previously written the music and co-written the lyrics for the 1989 London musical Metropolis.

Brooks decided not only to write the show's music, lyrics, and book by himself, but also to direct the production, saying, "I've seen article after article saying not to do it this way [...] But I'm going to do it anyway." Brooks had had prior experience as a multi-hyphenate on one project, particularly on the films You Light Up My Life (where he served as director, writer, producer and composer) and If Ever I See You Again (as director, producer, co-writer, composer, and lead actor).

The fact that the male lead, J.T., has Tourette's was inspired by Brooks's son's experience with the condition.

In a reference to Brooks's past work writing commercial jingles, at certain moments in the show, the character of God (who goes by the name "Al") sings Brooks's jingles for "Volkswagen" and "Dr. Pepper".

== Premise ==
The story centers around a love story between two people: Jenny, who works at the Village Voice processing personal ads, and who has obsessive–compulsive disorder (OCD), and J.T., a singer-songwriter with Tourette's syndrome who also shouts the word "lemon" whenever he is happy. As they meet and connect, they are observed from Heaven by an angel, Winston, who decides that their story would make a great "reality opera" – and since opera is often tragic, Winston decides to increase the drama by giving J.T. a brain tumor. They are also overseen by J.T.'s mother, Liz, and his little sister Vera, who were both killed in a car crash by a drunk driver who is also in Heaven; and by the Lord himself, who wants a vacation from his work as God and goes by the name "Al".

== Musical numbers ==
The show was played without an intermission.

- "LIfe Turns on a Dime" – Vera, J.T., Jenny
- "It Almost Feels Like Love" – J.T., Jenny
- "Perfect for an Opera" – Winston
- "What a Strange Life We Live" – Jenny
- "Doomed" – Winston, Nick and Ensemble
- "What a Strange Life We Live (reprise)" – Vera
- "Sempre Mio Rimani" – Liz
- "I Am My Mother's Son" – J.T.
- "Life Turns on a Dime (reprise)" – Jenny
- "Volkswagen" – Al
- "What a Strange Life We Live (reprise)" – Nick
- "Headaches" – Winston, Nick, Liz, Vera and Ensemble
- "When I Sing" – J.T.
- "Secrets" – Winston and Ensemble
- "In My Life" – Jenny, J.T.
- "A Ride on the Wheel" – Nick, Samantha, J.T., Ensemble
- "Perfect for an Opera (reprise)" – Winston, Liz, Nick, Vera
- "Didn't Have to Love You" – Jenny, J.T.
- "Listen to Your Mouth" – Winston, Al
- "When She Danced" – Liz, Vera
- "Volkswagen (reprise)" – Al
- "Not This Day" – Al
- "Floating on Air" – J.T.
- "Not This Day (reprise)" – J.T., Jenny, Liz, Nick, Vera, Al and Ensemble
- "Life Turns on a Dime (reprise)" – Vera and Full Company

== Original Broadway production ==
In My Life opened on Broadway at the Music Box Theatre on October 20, 2005, after 23 preview performances.

=== Production team ===
- Joseph Brooks – Music, Lyrics, Book, Director
- Allen Moyer – Scenic design
- Catherine Zuber – Costume design
- Christopher Akerlind – Lighting design
- Wendall K. Harrington – Projection design
- John Shivers – Sound design
- Richard Stafford – Musical staging
- Kinny Landrum – Orchestrations
- Henry Aronson – Musical director

=== Cast ===
- Jessica Boevers – Jenny
- Christopher J. Hanke – J.T.
- David Turner – Winston
- Roberta Gumbel – Liz
- Michael Halling – Nick
- Laura Jordan – Samantha
- Chiara Navarra – Vera
- Michael J. Farina – Al
- Courtney Balan, Carmen Keels, Kilty Reidy, Brynn Williams – Ensemble

In My Life also marked the Broadway debut of Jonathan Groff, who served as an understudy for the roles of J.T. and Nick, in addition to being a swing and dance captain.

=== Orchestra ===
- Henry Aronson – conductor
- Ted Kooshian – keyboard 1
- Greg Dlugos – keyboard 2, associate conductor
- Maggie Torres – keyboard 3
- Fran Minarek – keyboard 4
- Bruce Uchitel – guitar 1
- J.J. McGeehan – guitar 2
- Randy Landau – bass
- Brian Brake – drums

=== Promoting the show ===
Starting prior to previews, two CD samplers of songs from the musical were printed to hand out to passersby in the Broadway theatre district of New York City. This approach was considered notable for a Broadway production, given the relative expense of printing CDs compared to simply handing out flyers to promote a show. At least 200,000 CDs were made for the campaign; one version of the sampler featured the songs "In My Life", "I Am My Mother's Son", and "Life Turns on a Dime", while the other featured those songs plus "When She Danced". The CD jacket featured the sentence, "Listen to the best music you've heard in your life". Additionally, a report by Broadway.com noted that the samplers listed "an incorrect start of performance date" as "September 27 rather than the correct September 30". These samplers are the only official recording of any songs from the show.

After the uniformly negative reviews, the production began an ad campaign reported to cost at least $1.5 million; said Nancy Coyne, head of the show's marketing, "They decided to take the budget allocated for the next six months and spend it on the next six weeks". At one point, the campaign featured New York Times theater critic Ben Brantley's description of the show's "jaw-dropping moments of whimsy run amok" as a pull-quote.

However, the campaign was ineffective, even with the show's weekly running cost of $320,000, which, according to the New York Times, "is very low by Broadway musical standards." In My Life closed on December 11, 2005, after 61 performances. No cast recording was made, and the libretto has never been published.

== Critical reception ==
The show received uniformly negative reviews.

David Rooney of Variety described In My Life as "an overblown soap opera framed by bizarre afterlife interludes and dripping with mawkish sentiment" and "an astonishing misfire" that "will be a must-see for all the Broadway tuner-train wreck completionists who still speak wistfully of [the legendary 1988 Broadway flop] Carrie." He criticized the songs as "generic and interchangeable", with lyrics that "generally range from preteen poetry [...] to syntactically ugly". He wrote that "long before a giant lemon (not kidding!) descends to dominate the stage in the final song, the suspicious arises that this might be an elaborate joke, like Bialystock and Bloom's insurance scam to hatch a surefire flop in The Producers", but that "no such trickery seems intended", and that "[the show] remains unswervingly earnest, even as it lurches unintentionally into parody."

Clive Barnes of the New York Post described the premise as "distinctly unpromising", and the show as "[fulfilling] every unpromise possible." He also wrote that "Brooks' music is tedious and his lyrics sentimentally simplistic — this from a man who's sold 80 million records. Perhaps he should have stopped while he was ahead." In a later column, Barnes described the show as "atrocious [...] in which the highlight was the final fall of the curtain, as welcome as a jail break."

Michael Kuchwara of the Associated Press wrote that the show was "more fun to talk about [...] than [to] actually sit through it", calling it "strange, strange, strange", and described the book as "tedious"; he wrote of the cast, "to [their] credit, they get through the evening with their dignity intact." Howard Kissell of the New York Daily News wrote that "[the show] is awful, but as disasters go, it's minor league."

William Stevenson of Broadway.com called the show "the most bizarre, misguided Broadway musical of the millennium [...] the schizophrenic show is one of those you-have-to-see-it-to-believe-it experiences". Terry Teachout of The Wall Street Journal compared the show to "Springtime for Hitler", the fictional musical from the Mel Brooks film The Producers that ended up being "so unintentionally funny that it becomes a smash hit." Teachout wrote that "I laughed all night long, occasionally in the right places." In a later review, he named In My Life as one of the worst musicals he'd ever reviewed.

Ben Brantley of The New York Times wrote that, while the show was supposedly "madly eccentric and surreal", the result in reality was "a musical Hallmark card" whose "careering story line," while on the surface "[making the show] sound like a grotesque folie de grandeur", was "merely an excuse to deliver inspirational messages that are commonly found on television movies of the week and to trot out one sticky boy-band-style ballad after another." He concluded with, "In My Life brings to mind that annoying breed of people who never stop talking about their quirks [...] because they are so afraid of being found out as the squares they truly are." In 2020, when Brantley stepped down as chief theatre critic for the Times, he named the musical the worst he had seen during his tenure.

Linda Winer of Newsday had kinder words for Brooks's "unpretentious, simple tunes", writing that "[Brooks] has a pleasant sense of absurdity and a feel for everything from vaudeville to harpsichord-driven 18th century opera pastiche." However, she still described the show as "gibberish".

However, Matthew Murray of Talkin' Broadway.com was more positive. He made serious criticisms of the show, disapproving of Brooks for taking on the entire project himself and for "[trying] to put everything [he could] imagine" into its story, as well as criticizing the show for often being "unintentionally funny", and damning it with faint praise by calling it "likely [...] the weirdest Broadway musical that most people will ever see", and "not the worst, mind you, or even the worst this season". However, he also praised much of Brooks's score as "attractive", with orchestrations and musical direction that "make them sound great", and the relationship between Jenny and J.T. as "engaging, full of honesty, heart, and a pervasive, sincere sweetness that more shows need." He also praised the "first-rate" design team, and said the cast was well-chosen. Overall, Murray thanked Brooks for "not giving us another cold-blooded, committee-crafted crowd pleaser", and for his "passion and individuality" that "[w]e're in desperate need of [...] right now." He ended his review with, "Regardless, welcome to Broadway, Mr. Brooks, and feel free to come back again. But do us – and yourself – a favor: Don't return alone."
