= Amanda Brooks =

American actress

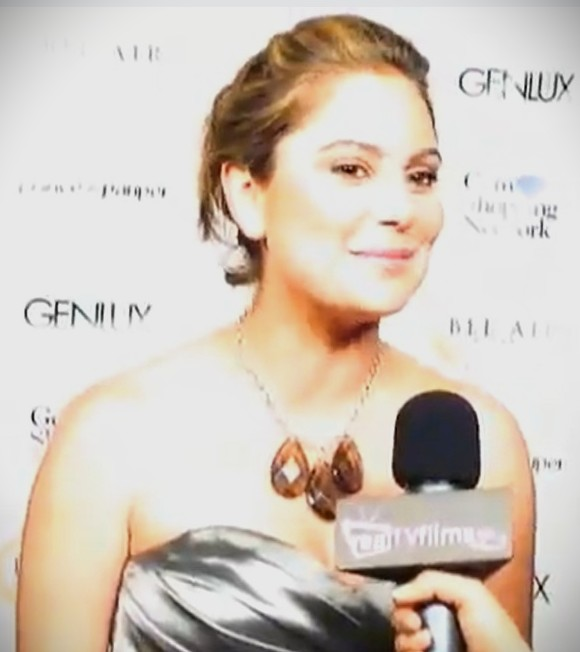
- Brooks interviewed in 2008
- Born: June 22, 1981 (age 45); New York City, New York, U.S.
- Years active: 2002–present

Amanda Brooks (born June 22, 1981) is an American actress who starred in the 2007 film D-War and in the 2006 film Cut Off. She also had a leading role in the 2005 film River's End. She also starred in The Canyons as Gina.

She is the daughter of "You Light Up My Life" songwriter Joseph Brooks, from whom she was estranged. In 2013, comments she made in support of her currently incarcerated brother Nicholas made the news.

== Filmography ==
Film roles
Year	Film	Role	Notes
2002	Yorick	Pagan Initiate #2	
2005	River's End	Regina Kennedy	
2005	Flightplan	Irene	
2006	Cut Off	Patricia Burton	
2007	D-War	Sarah Daniels	also known as Dragon Wars
2008	Stiletto	Penny	
2008	My Best Friend's Girl	Carly	
2009	Middletown	Sadie	Short film
2009	Happy Hour	Kathy	Short film
2011	Chillerama	Hot Newscaster	
2013	This Thing with Sarah	Sarah	
2013	The Canyons	Gina	
2021	Our Father	Cate	Short film

Television roles
Year	Film	Role	Notes
2009	Hellhounds	Demetria	Television film
2009	General Hospital	Mischa	3 episodes
2012	Revenge	Young Marion Harper	Episode: "Lineage"
2014	The Lottery	Brooke	Episode: Pilot
2015	Bones	Nan Roselick	Episode: "The Life in the Light"
2015	Longmire	Rebecca Eaves	Episode: "Help Wanted"
2016	Mistresses	Sharon Tate	Episodes: "What Happens in Vegas", "Survival of the Fittest"
2016	Aquarius	Sharon Tate	Recurring role, 9 episodes
2017	Timeless	Claire Gilliam	Episode: "Karma Chameleon"
2017	The Magicians	Professor Bigby	Episode: "Hotel Spa Potions"
2017	Outsiders	Dana Miller	4 episodes
2017	The Night Shift	Dana Carpenter	Episode: "Off The Rails"
2017	Nashville	Mackenzie Rhodes	3 episodes
2018	Castle Rock	Psychologist	Episode: "Harvest"
2018	Christmas Everlasting	Daphne	Television film
2021	The Birch	Julia Campbell	Web series; recurring role, 7 episodes
2022	Super Pumped	Rachel Whetstone	Recurring role, 4 episodes
2024	Chicago Med	Shana Lawson	Episode: "Forget Me Not"
2024–2025	Dexter: Original Sin	Becca Spencer	Recurring role
