= 1978 Stinkers Bad Movie Awards =

Award show honoring the worst in film

The 1978 Stinkers Bad Movie Awards were released by the Hastings Bad Cinema Society in 1979 to honour the worst the film industry had to offer in 1978. The ballot was later revisited and the expanded version was released in the summer of 2003. Listed as follows are the original ballot's picks for Worst Picture and its dishonourable mentions, which are films that were considered for Worst Picture but ultimately failed to make the final ballot (15 total), and all nominees included in the expanded ballot. All winners are highlighted.

== Original Ballot ==
=== Worst Picture ===
Film	Production company(s)
If Ever I See You Again	Columbia Pictures
The Bad News Bears Go to Japan	Paramount Pictures
Moment by Moment	Universal Pictures
Paradise Alley	Universal Pictures
Sgt. Pepper's Lonely Heart's Club Band	Universal Pictures

==== Dishonourable Mentions ====
- Attack of the Killer Tomatoes (NAI)
- Avalanche (New World)
- The Boys from Brazil (Fox)
- Days of Heaven (Paramount)
- Eraserhead (AFI)
- F. I. S. T. (United Artists)
- Game of Death (Columbia)
- Goin' Coconuts (Osmond Entertainment)
- It Lives Again (Warner Bros.)
- Oliver's Story (Paramount)
- Rabbit Test (AVCO Embassy)
- Renaldo and Clara (Circuit Films)
- Sextette (CIP)
- The Swarm (Warner Bros.)
- Thank God It's Friday (Columbia)

== Expanded Ballot ==
=== Worst Picture ===
Film	Production company(s)
Renaldo and Clara	Circuit Films
If Ever I See You Again	Columbia Pictures
Moment by Moment	Universal Pictures
Paradise Alley	Universal Pictures
Sgt. Pepper's Lonely Heart's Club Band	Universal Pictures

==== Dishonourable Mentions ====
- Avalanche (New World)
- The Bad News Bears Go to Japan (Paramount)
- Damien: Omen II (Fox)
- F.I.S.T. (United Artists)
- Goin' Coconuts (Osmond Entertainment)
- The Hound of the Baskervilles (Atlantic)
- It Lives Again (Warner Bros.)
- Laserblast (Irwin Yablans Company)
- The Lord of the Rings (United Artists)
- The Norseman (AIP)
- Rabbit Test (AVCO Embassy)
- Sextette (CIP)
- The Swarm (Warner Bros.)

=== Worst Director ===
Director	Film
Bob Dylan	Renaldo and Clara
Joe Brooks	If Ever I See You Again
Joan Rivers	Rabbit Test
Sylvester Stallone	Paradise Alley
Jane Wagner	Moment by Moment

==== Dishonourable Mentions ====
- Irwin Allen for The Swarm
- Ralph Bakshi for The Lord of the Rings
- John Berry for The Bad News Bears Go to Japan
- Paul Morrissey for The Hound of the Baskervilles
- Charles B. Pierce for The Norseman
- Michael Rae for Laserblast
- Michael Schultz for Sgt. Pepper's Lonely Heart's Club Band
- Don Taylor for Damien: Omen II

=== Worst Actor ===
Actor	Film
Sylvester Stallone	F.I.S.T. and Paradise Alley
Lee Majors	The Norseman
Kim Milford	Laserblast
Dudley Moore	The Hound of the Baskervilles
John Travolta	Moment by Moment

==== Dishonourable Mentions ====
- Billy Crystal in Rabbit Test
- Tony Curtis in The Bad News Bears Go to Japan and The Manitou
- Peter Frampton in Sgt. Pepper's Lonely Heart's Club Band
- Richard Gere in Bloodbrothers
- Tony LoBianco in Bloodbrothers
- Paul Sorvino in Bloodbrothers

=== Worst Actress ===
Actress	Film
Farrah Fawcett-Majors	Somebody Killed Her Husband
Sondra Locke	Every Which Way But Loose
Brooke Shields	Pretty Baby
Lily Tomlin	Moment by Moment
Mae West	Sextette

==== Dishonourable Mentions ====
- Joan Collins in The Stud
- Shelley Hack in If Ever I See You Again
- Ali MacGraw in Convoy
- Tatum O'Neal in International Velvet
- Diana Ross in The Wiz

=== Worst Supporting Actor ===
Actor	Film
Burt Young	Convoy
Jackie Earl Haley	The Bad News Bears Go To Japan
George Kennedy	Brass Target
Laurence Olivier	The Betsy and The Boys from Brazil
O. J. Simpson	Capricorn One

==== Dishonourable Mentions ====
- Billy Barty in Foul Play
- Jeremy Black in The Boys From Brazil
- Peter Cook in The Hound of the Baskervilles
- Eddie Deezen in Laserblast
- Sterling Hayden in King of the Gypsies
- Dudley Moore in Foul Play
- Alex Rocco in Rabbit Test
- Jonathan Scott-Taylor in Damien: Omen II

=== Worst Supporting Actress ===
Actress	Film
Joan Greenwood	The Hound of the Baskervilles
Lelia Goldoni	Bloodbrothers
Ruth Gordon	Every Which Way But Loose
Dianne Steinberg (aka Lucy In The Sky With Diamonds)	Sgt. Pepper's Lonely Heart's Club Band
Shelley Winters	King of the Gypsies

==== Dishonourable Mentions ====
- Ann-Margret in The Cheap Detective
- Dyan Cannon in Heaven Can Wait
- Sandy Farina in Sgt. Pepper's Lonely Heart's Club Band
- Doris Roberts in Rabbit Test

=== Worst Screenplay ===
Film	Production company(s)
Rabbit Test	AVCO Embassy
The Hound of the Baskervilles	Atlantic
Moment by Moment	Universal
Paradise Alley	Universal
Renaldo and Clara	Circuit Films

==== Dishonourable Mentions ====
- The Bad News Bears Go to Japan (Paramount)
- Damien: Omen II (Fox)
- F.I.S.T. (United Artists)
- Sextette (CIP)
- Sgt. Pepper's Lonely Heart's Club Band (Universal)
- The Swarm (Warner Bros.)

=== Most Painfully Unfunny Comedy ===
Film	Production company(s)
Rabbit Test	AVCO Embassy
The Bad News Bears Go to Japan	Paramount
The End	United Artists
The Hound of the Baskervilles	Atlantic
Sextette	CIP

==== Dishonourable Mentions ====
- The Cat from Outer Space (Disney)
- California Suite (Columbia)
- The Cheap Detective (Columbia)
- Every Which Way But Loose (Warner Bros.)
- Goin' Coconuts (Osmond Entertainment)
- Revenge of the Pink Panther (United Artists)
- Who Is Killing the Great Chefs of Europe? (Warner Bros.)

=== Worst Song or Song Performance in a Film or Its End Credits ===
Song and Artist	Film
"Too Close To Paradise" by Sylvester Stallone	Paradise Alley
"I Seek The Night" by Sondra Locke	Every Which Way But Loose
"If Ever I See You Again" by Joe Brooks	If Ever I See You Again
"Love Keeps Getting Stronger Every Day" by Neil Sedaka	Somebody Killed Her Husband
"On the Shelf" by Donny & Marie Osmond	Goin' Coconuts

==== Dishonourable Mentions ====
- "California" by Joe Brooks from If Ever I See You Again
- "Can You Read My Mind?" by Margot Kidder from Superman The Movie
- "Convoy" by C.W. McCall from Convoy
- "Here's Another Fine Mess" by Paul Williams from The End
- "Fixing A Hole" by George Burns from Sgt. Pepper's Lonely Heart's Club Band
- "FM" by Steely Dan from FM
- "For You and I" by 10cc from Moment by Moment
- "Love Will Keep Us Together" by Timothy Dalton & Mae West from Sextette
- "Maxwell's Silver Hammer" by Steve Martin from Sgt. Pepper's Lonely Heart's Club Band
- "Up In Smoke" by Cheech and Chong from Up in Smoke
- "You Can't Win" by Michael Jackson from The Wiz

=== Worst On-Screen Couple ===
Couple	Film
John Travolta and Lily Tomlin	Moment by Moment
Joe Brooks and Shelley Hack	If Ever I See You Again
Clint Eastwood and Clyde The Orangutan	Every Which Way But Loose
Anthony Quinn and Jacqueline Bisset	The Greek Tycoon
Mae West and Timothy Dalton	Sextette

==== Dishonourable Mentions ====
- Cheech and Chong in Up in Smoke
- Peter Cook and Dudley Moore in The Hound of the Baskervilles
- Farrah Fawcett-Majors and Jeff Bridges in Somebody Killed Her Husband
- Charles Grodin and Dyan Cannon in Heaven Can Wait
- Kris Kristofferson and Ali MacGraw in Convoy
- Lee Majors and his fake moustache in The Norseman
- Donny and Marie Osmond in Goin' Coconuts
- Robert Redford and/or James Caan and Jane Fonda in The Electric Horseman and/or Comes a Horseman

=== Worst Fake Accent (Male) ===
Actor	Film
Burt Young	Convoy
Jeremy Black	The Boys from Brazil
Richard Gere	Bloodbrothers and Days of Heaven
Dudley Moore	The Hound of the Baskervilles
Laurence Olivier	The Betsy and The Boys from Brazil

==== Dishonourable Mentions ====
- Peter Falk in The Cheap Detective
- Tony Lo Bianco in Bloodbrothers
- Alex Rocco in Rabbit Test
- Paul Sorvino in Bloodbrothers

=== Worst Fake Accent (Female) ===
Actress	Film
Linda Manz	Days of Heaven
Ann-Margret	The Cheap Detective
Barbara Eden	Harper Valley PTA
Brooke Shields	Pretty Baby
Shelley Winters	King of the Gypsies

==== Dishonourable Mention ====
- Marilu Henner in Bloodbrothers

=== Most Annoying Non-Human Character ===
Non-Human	Film
Clyde The Orangutan	Every Which Way But Loose
Bruce the Mechanical Shark	Jaws 2
Fats the Dummy	Magic
Jake The Annoying Cat From Outer Space	The Cat from Outer Space
The New Toto	The Wiz

=== Worst Sequel ===
Film	Production company(s)
The Bad News Bears Go to Japan	Paramount
Damien: Omen II	Fox
It Lives Again	Warner Bros.
Jaws 2	Universal
Revenge of the Pink Panther	United Artists

==== Dishonourable Mentions ====
- International Velvet (MGM)
- Oliver's Story (Paramount)

=== Worst On-Screen Group ===
Group	Film
The Bad News Bears	The Bad News Bears Go to Japan
The Black Widow Motorcycle Gang	Every Which Way But Loose
The Bloodbrothers	Bloodbrothers
The Gypsies	King of the Gypsies
Lucy and the Diamonds	Sgt. Pepper's Lonely Heart's Club Band

==== Dishonourable Mentions ====
- The aliens who seem to be appearing in a different movie in Laserblast
- The Bee Gees in Sgt. Pepper's Lonely Heart's Club Band
- The Supermodels in The Eyes of Laura Mars
