= Caitlin Saylor Stephens =

American playwright, librettist, and performance artist

Caitlin Saylor Stephens is an American playwright known for her plays When We Went Electronic (2018), Modern Swimwear (2023), and Five Models in Ruins, 1981 (2025), which premiered at Lincoln Center Theater.

== Early life and education ==
Stephens grew up between Baltimore, Maryland, and New York City. She attended Sarah Lawrence College.

== Career ==
Stephens began her career creating interdisciplinary performance works, frequently under the moniker Discount Therapy Club.

Her play When We Went Electronic premiered at The Tank in New York City in 2018. Set in an American Apparel store, the play follows two retail employees attempting to reconstruct the events of a traumatic evening through increasingly extreme methods. The production later toured internationally.

In 2023, Stephens's play Modern Swimwear, inspired by the life and death of swimwear designer Sylvie Cachay, premiered at The Tank in New York City under the direction of Meghan Finn. The project received support from the New York City Women's Fund for Media, Music and Theatre, administered by the Mayor's Office of Media and Entertainment.

In 2025, Stephens's play Five Models in Ruins, 1981 premiered at Lincoln Center Theater in the Claire Tow Theater under the direction of Morgan Green. The production starred Elizabeth Marvel. The play was originally commissioned by Lincoln Center Theater in 2019 and developed during Stephens's residency with LCT3 before premiering in 2025.

== Themes and style ==
Stephens's work frequently explores themes of American womanhood, labor, performance, and consumer culture. Fashion serves as a recurring motif throughout her plays. She has cited Cindy Sherman, John Kelly (performance artist), and Sarah Kane among her artistic influences.

== Critical reception ==
Reviewing When We Went Electronic for The New York Times, Alexis Soloski described the play as possessing "absurdist edginess" and being "taut and brutal".

Stephens's Modern Swimwear received critical attention for its treatment of the life and death of swimwear designer Sylvie Cachay. In The New York Times, Juan A. Ramírez characterized the play as "subtly gutting". The New Yorker praised the production for its "scrupulous care" in reconstructing the circumstances surrounding Cachay's final hours.

Reviewing Five Models in Ruins, 1981 for Vulture, Jackson McHenry noted Stephens' depictions of fashion culture "evince both horror and admiration." Sara Holdren included Five Models in Ruins, 1981 in New York magazine's list of "New York's 25 Best Of" for Spring 2025.

In The New York Times, Elizabeth Vincentelli praised the play's climactic turn, observing that, in its "final explosive scene," "Stephens goes nuclear."

Writing for TheaterMania, Zachary Stewart described Five Models in Ruins, 1981 as "more than just a showcase for period fashion and timeless quips about bulimia," calling it "a tribute to the women who sacrifice their youth and physical wellbeing to create something beautiful."

== Awards and recognition ==
Stephens was commissioned by Lincoln Center Theater and served as a New Artist-in-Residence at LCT3 from 2019 to 2025 and by Ensemble Studio Theater and The Alfred P. Sloan Foundation. She is a three-time recipient of public art funding from NYSCA.

== Selected works ==
=== Plays ===
- When We Went Electronic (2018)
- Modern Swimwear (2023)
- Five Models in Ruins, 1981 (2025)
