= If Ever I See You Again (film) =

1978 American romantic film by Joe Brooks

- Theatrical release poster
- Directed by: Joe Brooks
- Written by: Joe Brooks; Martin Davidson
- Produced by: Joe Brooks
- Starring: Joe Brooks; Shelley Hack; Jimmy Breslin; Jerry Keller; George Plimpton
- Cinematography: Adam Holender
- Edited by: Rick Shaine
- Music by: Joe Brooks
- Distributed by: Columbia Pictures
- Release date: May 24, 1978 (U.S.)
- Running time: 105 minutes
- Country: United States
- Language: English
- Budget: $2 million
- Box office: $1.5 million

If Ever I See You Again is a 1978 American romantic drama film about a composer who rekindles his relationship with a former girlfriend. It stars Joe Brooks, who also co-wrote, produced, directed, and scored the film, and Shelley Hack. The film's theme song, "If Ever I See You Again", was a moderate hit for Roberta Flack, reaching #24 on the Billboard Hot 100 chart.

== Plot ==
Bob Morrison is a successful composer of TV commercial jingles who has become rich from his work, allowing him to make a good life in New York City for himself and his two young children. However, Bob is frustrated with having to conform his music to the ideas of executives such as Lawrence, who are often eccentric or rude. Bob secretly envies his old friend David, who has lived in relative poverty for years while pursuing a career as a classical pianist. David's sacrifices are now starting to pay off with a concert at Carnegie Hall, and he is also happily married, while Bob has been a widower for some years (the death of his wife is strongly implied, although not shown or stated directly). Bob never got over his college girlfriend, Jennifer Corly, with whom he had a brief relationship in college. She then broke up with him, claiming she wasn't ready for a serious commitment, and dated another man.

Bob and his assistant Mario travel to L.A. for one day to meet two movie producers for whom Bob hopes to score a film. While there, Bob learns that Jennifer is living in Malibu, calls her, and visits her at home shortly before he has to leave. Jennifer has become a painter, remains beautiful and unmarried, and appears to be attracted to Bob, even kissing him goodbye at the airport. Bob falls in love with her all over again.

Back in New York just before Christmas, Bob's frustrations led him, along with his partner Steve Warner, to decide to close down their jingle-writing business, thus putting Mario out of a job. However, before Bob can inform Mario, Mario makes a grateful speech thanking Bob for all Bob has done for him, leaving Bob feeling too guilty to speak further. Bob then learns that the producers are seriously considering hiring him, but they insist that he come to L.A. to record music for the final audition. Bob reluctantly agrees to go, although he prefers to work from New York.

Upon arriving, Bob calls Jennifer and invites her to his recording session and to dinner, but she abruptly declines. A dejected Bob goes to the studio, but cheers up after David arrives unexpectedly to play piano at his session, and then Jennifer arrives, having changed her mind. Afterwards, Bob confesses to Jennifer that he composed the love song recorded at the session many years ago with her in mind. Bob and Jennifer make love and spend time together, but Jennifer breaks up with him again, telling him that although she loves him, she's "not a forever person" and can't change. As she drives away, Bob learns that he has landed the film score job and will even be able to work from New York City, as he prefers, meaning he will not have to return to California.

Heartbroken, Bob returns to New York and prepares to celebrate the holidays with his family and friends. While he is hosting a children's Christmas party, Jennifer suddenly appears, having reconsidered the breakup, and Bob and Jennifer happily reunite.

== Cast ==
- Joe Brooks as Bob Morrison
- Shelley Hack as Jennifer Corly
- Jimmy Breslin as Mario Marino
- Jerry Keller as Steve Warner
- George Plimpton as Laurence Lawrence
- Kenny Karen as David Miller
- Caroline Mignini as Laura Miller
- Shannon Bolin as Elsa
- Danielle Brisebois as Amy Morrison
- Branch Emerson as Jonathan Morrison

Peter Billingsley, then a child actor who became well known a few years later as "Ralphie" in A Christmas Story, made one of his first film appearances in the Christmas party scene.

== Production ==
Brooks made If Ever I See You Again as the follow-up to his successful 1977 film, You Light Up My Life, which Brooks had produced, written, directed and scored. You Light Up My Life was a box office hit and the title song "You Light Up My Life" was an even bigger success, setting a new record for most weeks at #1 on the Hot 100 Chart and winning Brooks an Academy Award for Best Original Song, a Grammy Award for Song of the Year, and other honors.

Brooks' partner, Robert K. Lifton, later wrote that he and Brooks set out to make a similar follow-up, as financing was likely to be available for a concept that had already been proven successful. In his self-published memoir, Lifton wrote that they "focus[ed] on making low cost movies with music that could carry the movie and let the record help the movie and the movie help the record." For If Ever I See You Again, Brooks and Lifton obtained financing from a friend whose son was seeking a movie business experience, and were therefore able to make the movie with little financial risk to themselves. Daily Variety at the time of production reported a budget of first $1.45 million and later $1.8 million. Film historian Paul Talbot later reported the production budget as $3 million.

In addition to producing, co-writing, directing and scoring the film, Brooks also decided to play the leading role of "Bob Morrison" himself. Although the character mirrored Brooks' own life as a rich, successful composer of advertising jingles who moved into film work, Brooks had no significant acting experience. Brooks claimed to have spent $20,000 on giving himself two screen tests to make sure he could play the role and received Columbia Pictures' approval based on the tests. In a New York Times interview while the film was in production, Brooks said, "I really thought I was the best guy to play the lead." According to one columnist, Brooks cast himself in the part after Al Pacino and George Segal both turned it down.

Like Brooks, most of the other main actors were also inexperienced. Jerry Keller and Kenny Karen were former pop musicians turned jingle creators who had worked with Brooks in the past. Keller's film experience consisted of a bit part in You Light Up My Life as an orchestra music director. Shelley Hack was then a model best known for appearing in a television commercial for Revlon's "Charlie" fragrance, who had a two-line part in Woody Allen's acclaimed film Annie Hall. Jimmy Breslin and George Plimpton were primarily known as journalists and authors, although Plimpton had small parts in several previous films.

Working titles for the film included The Mozart of Madison Avenue and California. It was shot in New York City and Los Angeles during the holiday season of 1977. Flashback scenes to Bob and Jennifer's college days were shot on the campus of Cazenovia College in the winter of 1977. College students were used as scene extras. The cast provided their own wardrobes. Hack, who in real life was nearsighted, wore her own glasses.

According to Daily Variety, Columbia spent an additional $2.5 million on promoting the film. In addition to the soundtrack album, a paperback novelization of the screenplay was released by Bantam Books in May 1978 as a promotional tie-in. As a further promotional gimmick, Columbia teamed with Pertec Computer to "reunite lost lovers whenever a toll-free number is called" by having a computer match up the details of callers. An editor of Minicomputer News and his secretary posed as former lovers attempting to locate each other to test the service, with somewhat unsuccessful results.

== Soundtrack ==
If Ever I See You Again: Original Motion Picture Soundtrack

Soundtrack album by Joseph Brooks and various artists
- Released: May 1978
- Recorded: 1978
- Studios: A&R Recording Studios; New York City
- Genres: Pop, Film score
- Label: Warner Bros.
- Producer: Joseph Brooks

Singles from If Ever I See You Again
- 1. "California" Released: February 1978; 2. "If Ever I See You Again" Released: April 1978

In keeping with the idea of "music that could carry the movie," Brooks wrote a number of songs for the film: he also revived for the soundtrack the 1966 Julie Monday regional hit "Come Share the Good Times With Me" with the title adjusted to "Come Share My Love" (Brooks had produced the Julie Monday recording but its songwriting credit had been to Gilbert Kennington a pseudonym for Brooks' brother Gilbert Kaplan: however authorship of "Come Share My Love" was credited to Brooks himself). Prior to the film's release, Brooks arranged for Debby Boone, who in the preceding months had achieved blockbuster success with her debut solo single: her rendition of the theme song from Brooks' first film production You Light Up My Life, to record versions of the title theme "If Ever I See You Again", "California", "Come Share My Love", "It Was Such a Good Day", and "When It's Over". Boone released "California" in February 1978 as the follow-up to "You Light Up My Life", but "California" only reached #50 on the Hot 100 chart, failing to duplicate Boone's previous success. The versions recorded by Boone were eventually released on her album Midstream (1978).

After the relative failure of Boone's "California", Brooks reached out to Atlantic Records to get Roberta Flack, an established artist with a track record of number one hits, to record "If Ever I See You Again". According to Flack, she "couldn't stand" the song and agreed to record it only after being pressured by the president of Atlantic and negotiating a "huge money deal". Flack subsequently recorded versions of the title song as well as "Come Share My Love" and "When It's Over", all produced by Brooks.

Flack's version of "If Ever I See You Again" was released in April 1978 in preparation for the May 1978 opening of the film. Although the song was a moderate hit, reaching #24 on the Hot 100, #1 on the Billboard Easy Listening chart, and #37 on the R&B chart, it failed to match the success of several previous hit singles by Flack, much less the popularity of "You Light Up My Life". The film songs recorded by Flack, including "If Ever I See You Again", were included on her self-titled 1978 album Roberta Flack.

Brooks also recorded the film's songs for an album on Atlantic titled The Joe Brooks Group.

An original soundtrack double album for the film was also released on Warner Bros., which contained instrumental music from the film, Boone's versions of "California" and "Come Share My Love", and other songs performed by studio musicians including male vocalist Jamie Carr (who sang the theme song in the film). The album did not contain Flack's version of the theme song or any other contributions by Flack.

=== Track listing ===
Side 1:

1. "If Ever I See You Again" (Vocal) – Jamie Carr (4:16)
2. "California" (Group) – Joe Brooks (3:33)
3. "Something To Sell" – Joe Brooks (2:12)
4. "When It's Over" (Instrumental) – Joe Brooks (3:18)
5. "Christmas Song" (Version 2) – Joe Brooks (2:28)

Side 2:

1. "When It's Over" (Vocal) – Joe Brooks (3:18)
2. "If Ever I See You Again" (Jennifer's House) – Joe Brooks (4:42)
3. "Wake Up" – Joe Brooks (0:52)
4. "Walk To Jennifer's House/California" – Joe Brooks (7:10)

Side 3:

1. "Come Share My Love" – Joe Brooks (3:40)
2. "EKG Machine" – Joe Brooks (0:41)
3. "California" (Slow Instrumental) – Joe Brooks (3:12)
4. "If Ever I See You Again" (Instrumental) – Joe Brooks (4:16)
5. "Christmas Song" (Montage) – Joe Brooks (3:55)

Side 4:

1. "California" (Slow Vocal) – Joe Brooks (3:12)
2. "When It's Over" (Montage) – Joe Brooks (3:18)
3. "David's Concert" – Kenny Karen (1:57)
4. "Boulevard & Backroads" – Joe Brooks (3:05)
5. "Come Share My Love" – Debby Boone (3:44)

== Reception ==
Notwithstanding the moderate success of Flack's single, and the considerable effort and cost put into promoting the film, If Ever I See You Again received generally negative reviews (although the Los Angeles Times praised the "nice, natural quality" of the performances "despite Brooks' stilted direction") and bombed at the box office. Hack later admitted in an interview that it was "a bomb". Reportedly, it failed to recoup its production budget or even its promotional costs.

Janet Maslin of The New York Times said that "it's easy to see why [Brooks] was so resoundingly well suited to his former line of work [as a writer of advertising jingles], but as a film director he has not yet progressed beyond the visual monotony of most television direction, nor does he risk much in his pacing." Desmond Ryan of The Philadelphia Inquirer remarked that "Joe Brooks does everything but change the sheets in this abysmal venture."

Some of the criticism centered on poor acting by Brooks or other members of the inexperienced cast. Breslin and the film were nominated in Harry and Michael Medved's 1980 book The Golden Turkey Awards in the category "Worst Acting Performance by a Novelist". Leonard Maltin, who gave it a grade of 1 1/2 stars, stated, "Breslin should stick to his typewriter."

The film's reputation did not improve with time. In 2011, an article in New York magazine termed it an "obscure flop".

If Ever I See You Again was released on VHS in 1986. As of 2015, it had not been released on DVD.

=== Accolades ===
This film won Worst Picture at the first Stinkers Bad Movie Awards. When the ballot for that year was revisited and expanded in 2003, it was again nominated for Worst Picture, but lost to Renaldo and Clara. This film received three other nominations and two dishonorable mentions.

Date	Award	Category	Recipients	Result	Ref.
1979	Stinkers Bad Movie Awards	Worst Picture	If Ever I See You Again (Columbia Pictures)	Won	
2003 (expanded ballot)	Stinkers Bad Movie Awards	Worst Picture	If Ever I See You Again (Columbia Pictures)	Nominated	
2003 (expanded ballot)	Stinkers Bad Movie Awards	Worst Director	Joe Brooks	Nominated	
2003 (expanded ballot)	Stinkers Bad Movie Awards	Worst Actress	Shelley Hack	Dishonourable Mention	
2003 (expanded ballot)	Stinkers Bad Movie Awards	Worst Song or Song Performance in a Film or Its End Credits	"If Ever I See You Again" by Joe Brooks	Nominated	
2003 (expanded ballot)	Stinkers Bad Movie Awards	Worst Song or Song Performance in a Film or Its End Credits	"California" by Joe Brooks	Dishonourable Mention	
2003 (expanded ballot)	Stinkers Bad Movie Awards	Worst On-Screen Couple	Joe Brooks and Shelley Hack	Nominated	

Awards
Preceded by New Award	Stinker Award for Worst Picture (preceded Renaldo and Clara); 1978 Stinkers Bad Movie Awards	Succeeded by Nightwing and The Main Event
