= Invitation to the Wedding =

1983 comedy film

- Directed by: Joseph Brooks
- Written by: William Fairchild
- Produced by: Joseph Brooks
- Starring: Ralph Richardson; John Gielgud
- Cinematography: Freddie Young
- Edited by: Gerry Hambling
- Music by: Joseph Brooks
- Production company: Chancery Lane
- Release date: 1983
- Running time: 90 minutes
- Country: United Kingdom
- Language: English
- Budget: $8,000,000 (estimated)

Invitation to the Wedding is a 1983 comedy film. It was directed by Joseph Brooks.

== Cast ==
- Ralph Richardson as Uncle Willie
- John Gielgud as Reverend Clyde Ormiston
- Paul Nicholas as David Anderson
- Elizabeth Shepherd as Lady Caroline
- John Standing as Earl Harry
- Edward Duke as Nigel
- Susan Brooks as Lady Anne
- Ronald Lacey as Clara / Charles Eatwell
- Janet Burnell as Annabel
- Jeremy Clyde as Teddy Barrington
- Allan Cuthbertson as General Barrington
- Aimée Delamain as Clementine
- Leslie French as Hobbs
- Kate Harper as Amanda
- Dave Hill as Higson
- Tony Melody as Vine
- Nancy Wood as Vanena
- Rolf Saxon as Peter
- Joris Stuyck as Mike
- Keith Edwards as Greg
- Marc Smith as Millstein
- Bradley Lavelle as Burke
- Nigel Greaves as Soames
- Robert Easton as American Husband
- Mary Ellen Ray as American Wife
