= D-War =

2007 film by Shim Hyung-rae

- North American theatrical release poster
- Hangul: 디워
- RR: Diwo
- MR: Tiwŏ
- Directed by: Shim Hyung-rae
- Written by: Shim Hyung-rae
- Produced by: Choi Sung-ho; Jeong Tae-sung; James B. Kang
- Starring: Jason Behr; Amanda Brooks; Craig Robinson; Elizabeth Peña; Robert Forster
- Cinematography: Hubert Taczanowski
- Edited by: Tim Alverson
- Music by: Steve Jablonsky
- Production company: Younggu-Art; Showbox; Zero Nine Entertainment; CJ ENM Films & Television
- Distributed by: Showbox (South Korea); Freestyle Releasing (US)
- Release dates: 1 August 2007 (South Korea); 14 September 2007 (US)
- Running time: 90 minutes
- Countries: South Korea; United States
- Languages: English; Korean
- Budget: $32–75 million
- Box office: $79.9 million

D-War (Korean: 디워, released in North America as Dragon Wars: D-War) is a 2007 fantasy monster action film written and directed by South Korean filmmaker Shim Hyung-rae and starring Jason Behr, Amanda Brooks, Craig Robinson, Elizabeth Peña and Robert Forster. The plot involves ancient Korean dragons (Imugi) appearing in modern-day Los Angeles.

The film was an international co-production between South Korea and the United States, with a mainly-Korean crew but shot in the United States with American actors. At the time of its release, it was the highest-budgeted South Korean film of all time, and was the first Korean film in nearly 30 years to receive a wide theatrical release in North America. D-War grossed $79 million worldwide and receives negative reviews from critics.

== Plot ==
The story follows Ethan Kendrick, who was tasked as a child by the enigmatic Jack with protecting the Yuh Yi Joo, a person born with the power to transform an Imoogi chosen by heaven into a Celestial Dragon. Ethan must protect the Yuh Yi Joo from Buraki, a corrupt Imoogi who was previously thwarted by the earlier incarnations of Ethan and Jack. Jack gives Ethan a medallion that belonged to his previous incarnation, Haram, and reveals that the reincarnated Yuh Yi Joo is Sarah Daniels, whom Ethan will find in Los Angeles.

Fifteen years later, Buraki invades Los Angeles to capture Sarah. Ethan, now a television news anchor, rescues her, explains her purpose, and attempts to protect her. As they flee, both gradually regain the memories of their past lives. Meanwhile, Buraki's Atrox Army invades the city and battles the United States Army, the United States Air Force, and the Los Angeles Police Department. The army consists of black-armored humanoid knights, theropod-like cavalry called Shaconnes, small winged Western dragons called Bulcos, and enormous, slow-moving reptiles carrying rocket-launchers on their backs, known as Dawdlers. Despite suffering casualties, the Atrox Army overwhelms the human forces.

Ethan and Sarah escape the city but are captured by the Bulcos and taken to a menacing fortress in a darkened desert. As Buraki emerges to consume Sarah, Ethan's medallion releases a powerful force that destroys the Atrox Army. Ethan tries to stop Buraki from consuming Sarah but is knocked aside. The Good Imoogi, destined to receive Sarah's power, emerges from the fortress and attacks Buraki. The two Imoogis fight, and Buraki appears to prevail after seemingly snapping the Good Imoogi's neck.

Buraki approaches Sarah again, but she willingly offers herself and instead transfers her power to the injured Good Imoogi, which absorbs it. Sarah faints as the Good Imoogi transforms into a Celestial Dragon (Type: Lung Dragon). The newly transformed dragon resumes the battle and ultimately destroys Buraki with a blast of flames.

Ethan watches as Sarah dissolves into a spirit form. The Celestial Dragon allows her to speak to him, and she promises that they will meet again and that she will "love...for all eternity." The dragon then draws Sarah into its body and ascends through the parting clouds into the heavens. Jack appears behind Ethan and reminds him that they "have been given a great honor" by witnessing the transformation before vanishing. Ethan whispers, "Goodbye old man," and walks away into the desert.

== Cast ==
- Jason Behr as Ethan Kendrick
  - Cody Arens as young Ethan
- Amanda Brooks as Sarah Daniels, the holder of the Yeo-Yi-Ju
  - Cheyenne Alexis Dean as young Sarah
- Robert Forster as Jack, Ethan's mentor and Sarah's guardian
- Chris Mulkey as Agent Frank Pinsky, senior partner of an investigation
- Elizabeth Peña as Agent Linda Perez, a scientist employed by the FBI
- Craig Robinson as Bruce, Ethan's fellow-member in televised journalism
- Aimee Garcia as Brandy, Sarah's friend
- John Ales as Agent Judah Campbell, junior partner to Frank Pinsky
- Billy Gardell as Mr. Belafonte
- Holmes Osborne as Hypnotherapist
- Geoff Pierson as Secretary of State
- Matthias Hues, Gregory Hinton, Derek Mears, and Gerard Griesbaum as Bounty Hunters
- Retta as Receptionist Nurse
- Michael Shamus Wiles as Evil General
- Park Hyeon-jin as Haram, the previous incarnation of Ethan's soul
  - Moon Kyu-ho as young Haram
- Ban Hyo-jin as Narin, the previous incarnation of Sarah's soul
- Min Ji-hwan as Bochun
- Lee Jong-man as Lord Yun
- Roberta Farkas (uncredited) as Narrator

== Production ==
Originally titled Dragon Wars (and still referred to by this title in publicity material), D-War had a long production history in South Korea. The film was announced in 2001 by director Shim Hyung-rae as his follow-up project to 1999's Yonggary. The budget was set at 30 billion won (approximately US$35 million), but ultimately went over budget in order to create the various creatures in the film, with some outside estimation as high as $US75 million dollars. The DVD release confirmed that it did indeed cost US$99 million.

As with Yonggary, Shim opted for a mostly American cast. Veteran actor Robert Forster landed a pivotal role and Jason Behr and Amanda Brooks were cast as the two young leads.

The next three years were spent creating the creature effects, all of which were done in house by Shim's Younggu-Art Movies company. The completed film premiered at the American Film Market in early 2007 and was released in South Korea on 1 August. In the U.S., the film was released on 14 September by Freestyle Releasing.

On 7 August, South Korea's Munhwa Broadcasting Corporation (MBC) Morning Live TV Show broadcast the film's final scene on TV without the permission of the studio, causing a controversy. A few days later the Ministry of Culture and Tourism released a statement in which they said that the incident did not violate South Korean copyright laws.

== Release ==
=== Theatrical ===
A 110-minute cut was shown at the American Film Market on 4 November 2006 and at the Berlin Film Market on 8 February 2007. The film's final cut was edited down to 92 minutes for its South Korean and American release, after getting feedback from preview screenings. The film was released in South Korea on 1 August 2007. Freestyle Releasing released the film to 2,277 in the United States on September 14. It was the first Korean film to receive a wide release in the U.S.

== Reception ==
=== Box office ===
D-War set a record of grossing US$20.3 million in South Korea in its first five days of release. As of 1 September, the film has grossed US$44 million in Korea and another US$10 million in other countries, totaling a worldwide gross of US$54 million as of 16 September. In North America, the film grossed US$5 million on 2,275 screens in its opening weekend. As of 25 November, the film has grossed US$10,977,721 in North America.

Since then, D-War has been released theatrically in Malaysia and China, both with moderate critical reaction. China was the only one to live up to the South Korean release record, spawning 3,000,000 admissions and a premiere including pop idol Libing Chen. The film grossed an equivalent of less than $850,000 USD in Japan.

=== Critical response ===
On the review aggregator Rotten Tomatoes, the film holds an approval rating of 28% based on 36 reviews, with an average rating of 4.2/10. The website's critics consensus reads: "Dragon Wars' special effects can't make up for an unfocused script and stale acting." Metacritic assigned the film a weighted average score of 31 out of 100 based on nine critics, indicating "general unfavorable reviews".

Derek Elley of Variety, reviewing it at the Berlin Film Festival's market section, called it "visually entertaining, and superior to helmer Shim Hyung-rae's last monster movie (Yonggary in 1999)", while also saying the film had a "Z-grade, irony-free script", and "likely to end up the most expensive cult movie on DVD". The Hollywood Reporter's Frank Scheck said that "the CGI effects are undeniably impressive" but that "the laughable story line, risible dialogue and cheap humor ... seriously detract from the fun". Luke Y. Thompson in L.A. Weekly derided the film as one "for connoisseurs of the 'totally preposterous crap' school of fantasy cinema... You know who you are: You have all the Warlock sequels on Laserdisc [and] the complete Leprechaun series on DVD" and says it's "funnier when it tries to be serious than when it goes for the gag".

Within nine days of its South Korean release, D-War attracted five million viewers, setting a national box office record for an opening week. The seemingly positive reaction from the Korean population, as indicated by the film's box office success in Korea, was widely attributed to the film's appeal to Korean nationalism, a logical impression drawn from Shim's message at the end of the Korean version of this film, "D-War and I will succeed in the world market without fail", accompanied by the Korean folk anthem, "Arirang". Despite its box office success, D-Wars was far from critically acclaimed by either Korean critics or Korea's general public. Korean film critic Kim Bong-sok said: "They want it to be successful in the U.S. because it's Korean, not because it's good" and called the film "immature and poorly made" and "below criticism". Other reactions from Korean critics have been similar.

== Cancelled sequel ==
In March 2016, a sequel entitled D-War II: Mysteries of the Dragon was announced to be in development and to be co-financed with China's H&R Global Pictures. The film was scheduled to be released in 2017, but no further information about the project has been forthcoming and it appears to have been shelved.
