= The Closer I Get to You =

1978 romantic ballad by Roberta Flack and Donny Hathaway

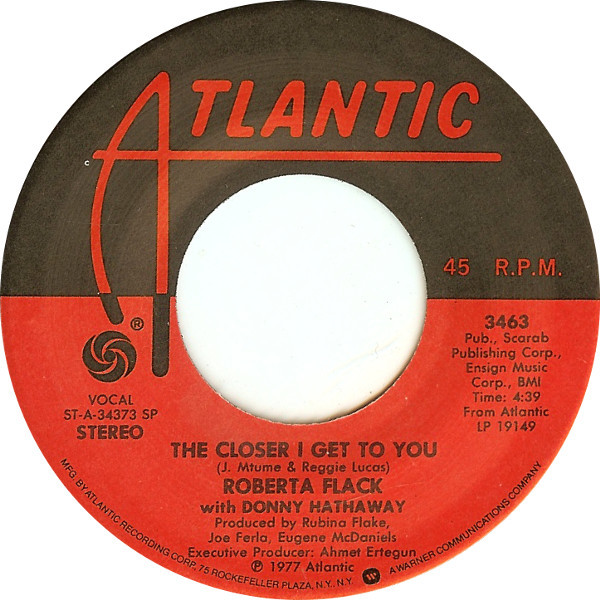
- A-side label of U.S. vinyl single

Single by Roberta Flack with Donny Hathaway

from the album Blue Lights in the Basement
- B-side: "Love Is the Healing"
- Released: February 1978
- Recorded: 1977
- Genre: Soul; R&B
- Length: 4:41
- Label: Atlantic
- Songwriters: Reggie Lucas; James Mtume
- Producers: Joe Ferla; Rubina Flake; Gene McDaniels

Roberta Flack singles chronology
| "25th of Last December" (1977) | "The Closer I Get to You" (1978) | "If Ever I See You Again" (1978) |

Donny Hathaway singles chronology
| "Come Little Children" (1974) | "The Closer I Get to You" (1978) | "You Were Meant for Me" (1978) |

Audio video
- "The Closer I Get to You" on YouTube

"The Closer I Get to You" is a romantic ballad performed by singer-songwriter Roberta Flack and soul musician Donny Hathaway. The song was written by James Mtume and Reggie Lucas, two former members of Miles Davis's band, who were members of Flack's band at the time. Produced by Atlantic Records, the song was released on Flack's 1977 album Blue Lights in the Basement, and as a single in 1978. It became a major crossover hit, becoming Flack's biggest commercial hit after her success with her 1973 solo single, "Killing Me Softly with His Song". Originally set as a solo single, Flack's manager, David Franklin, suggested a duet with Hathaway, which resulted in the finished work.

"The Closer I Get to You" spent two weeks as number one on the Hot Soul Singles chart in April 1978, and peaked at number two on the Billboard Hot 100 behind Yvonne Elliman's "If I Can't Have You" and Wings' "With a Little Luck." The song charted in the top ten spots for fourteen weeks in Canada and one week in France. It was eventually certified gold in the United States in May 1978, and became one of their most familiar duets. At the 21st Annual Grammy Awards given in 1979, Roberta Flack and Donny Hathaway were nominated for Best Pop Vocal Performance by a Duo, Group or Chorus with the award going to the Bee Gees for their work in the Saturday Night Fever soundtrack. The song would notably be covered by Luther Vandross and Beyoncé in 2003.

== Background and composition ==
"The Closer I Get to You" was written by Reggie Lucas and James Mtume, who were members of Roberta Flack's touring band and played on Blue Lights in the Basement. They wrote the song between tours and, during the sessions for the album, brought it to Flack's producer Joe Ferla, who played it for Flack. Ferla, Flack (as Rubina Flake) and Gene McDaniels produced the track, with Ahmet Ertegun serving as executive producer. Flack and Donny Hathaway, good friends while attending Howard University, had recorded a self-titled album of duets in 1972. Five years later, the duo collaborated again on "The Closer I Get to You".

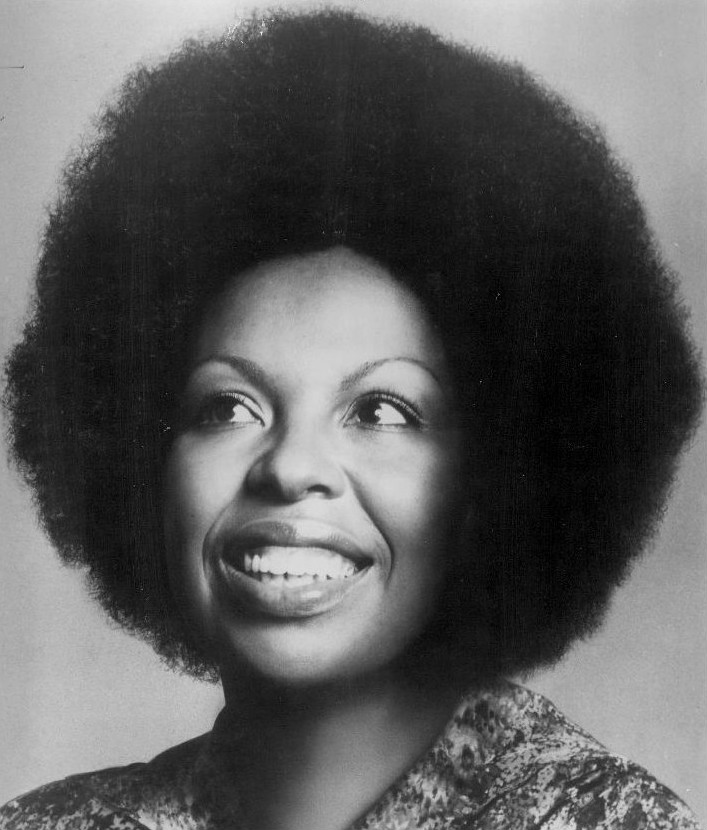
Roberta Flack, one of the members of the touring band in 1976

"The Closer I Get to You" was not originally written as a duet. Flack's manager David Franklin, who had worked with Hathaway in the past, decided to re-write the song to include him. Hathaway had been suffering from severe bouts of clinical depression at the time, which often forced him to be hospitalized. The depression also caused mood swings, which adversely affected his partnership with Flack, who, following Hathaway's death, would tell Jet magazine:

I tried to reach out to Donny. That's how we managed to do the song we did last year. I felt this need because I didn't know what to do. I couldn't save him, I knew he was sick. But I knew when he sat down at that piano and sang for me it was like it was eight or nine years ago because he sang and played his ass off.

In fact Hathaway's suffering had made it impossible for him to travel from Chicago to New York City to join Flack in the studio to record "The Closer I Get to You": Flack recorded her part of the song with a session singer as a stopgap duet partner, the track being sent to Chicago for Hathaway to add his vocal and then back to New York City for its final mixing.

Flack announced that "The Closer I Get to You" would forever be a dedication to Hathaway, and that all money made from the song would be donated to Hathaway's widow and two children. According to the sheet music published at Musicnotes.com by Sony/ATV Music Publishing, "The Closer I Get to You" is set in common time and moves at a tempo of 90 beats per minute. The song is written in the key of A major and follows the chord progression D_{maj9}–C♯_{m7}–F♯_{m7}–A_{maj7}. Flack sings in the vocal range of C♯_{4}–F♯_{5}. "The Closer I Get to You" was released as a 7-inch single with "Love is the Healing" as its B-side.

== Reception ==
=== Critical reception and accolades ===
Critics described "The Closer I Get to You" as Flack at the top of her form. The song came in at number 40 on Billboard' poll of "The 40 Biggest Duets Of All Time", where it was described a "tender tune". Authors of All Music Guide To Rock: The Definitive Guide to Rock, Pop, and Soul described the song as ethereal. Alan Light of Vibe magazine characterized it as intimate and effortless as an overheard conversation. Author of 1001 Ways to Be Romantic, Gregory J. P. Godek, included the song in a list of "Best Love Song Duets". A writer of Jet magazine described the song as a "pop-soul classic". Carolyn Quick Tillery, author of Celebrating Our Equality, described the song as a lasting musical legacy. Devon Jarvis of Women's Health included Flack and Hathaway's version of "The Closer I Get to You" in "Favorite Karaoke Duets". While opening the "R&B Vault", Gail Mitchell of Billboard praised the song as a 1970s-era classic. While reviewing Blue Lights in the Basement, Jason Elias of the website Allmusic wrote, "The track easily attains the grace and gorgeous sound that a lot of the like-minded songs here just miss." Lewis Dene of BBC described "The Closer I Get to You" as a "soul masterpiece". Both Hathaway and Flack were nominated for a Grammy Award for their duet.

=== Chart performance ===
In the United States, the song became the duo's second number one on the US Hot Soul Singles chart in 1978, and climbed to the number two spot on the Billboard Hot 100. "The Closer I Get to You" also peaked at number three on the Adult Contemporary charts and number 2 on the Cash Box Top 100. By the end of 1978, the single was positioned at number 38 on the Billboard Hot 100 and number 31 on the Cash Box Top 100 chart. In 2025, the single entered the R&B/Hip-Hop Digital Song Sales chart, peaking at number 10. In Canada, the single topped the RPM Singles Chart, and was positioned at number 17 on the chart by the end of 1978. In New Zealand, the single charted at number 16 on the New Zealand Singles Chart. In France, the single charted at number 10 on the French Singles Chart. In the United Kingdom, the single charted at number 42 on the UK Singles Chart.

== Music video ==
A music video for "The Closer I Get to You" was shot and directed by Roberta Flack herself. The video begins with Flack's singing while sitting by a piano in a candle-lit room. Hathaway had died by the time the music video was shot, so as his verse plays, the camera zooms into a picture of Hathaway located on a table behind Flack's shoulder. Flack performs the rest of the song sitting by the piano, and the camera's direction occasionally looks over a candle flame during Hathaway's verses. The video ends with Flack's mouthing some of Hathaway's lyrics as she fades into the camera's view of the room lit by a single candle. A version of Flack's performing the song live circulated as its promotional music video.

== Charts and certifications ==
=== Weekly charts ===
| Chart (1978) | Peak position |
|---|---|
| Canadian Singles Chart (RPM) | 1 |
| New Zealand Singles Chart | 16 |
| French Singles Chart | 10 |
| UK Singles Chart | 42 |
| US Hot Soul Singles | 1 |
| US Billboard Hot 100 | 2 |
| US Billboard Adult Contemporary | 3 |
| US Cash Box Top 100 | 2 |

| Chart (2025) | Peak position |
|---|---|
| US R&B/Hip-Hop Digital Song Sales (Billboard) | 10 |

=== Year-end charts ===
| Chart (1978) | Rank |
|---|---|
| Canada | 17 |
| US Billboard Hot 100 | 38 |
| US Cash Box | 31 |

== Luther Vandross and Beyoncé version ==
"The Closer I Get to You"

Single by Luther Vandross and Beyoncé

from the album Dance with My Father and Dangerously in Love
- Released: June 13, 2004
- Studio: The Hit Factory, New York City; Right Track Studios, New York City
- Genre: R&B
- Length: 6:25 (Dance with My Father version); 4:57 (Dangerously in Love version)
- Label: Columbia
- Songwriters: Reggie Lucas; James Mtume
- Producer: Nat Adderley Jr.

Luther Vandross singles chronology
| "Buy Me a Rose" (2004) | "The Closer I Get to You" (2004) | "Shine" (2006) |

Beyoncé singles chronology
| "Naughty Girl" (2004) | "The Closer I Get to You" (2004) | "Wishing on a Star" (2005) |

Audio video
- "The Closer I Get to You" on YouTube

Luther Vandross and Beyoncé's 2003 cover version of the song appeared on both Vandross's final album Dance with My Father and Beyoncé's solo debut Dangerously in Love (both 2003 respectively). Their version was recorded at The Hit Factory and the Right Track Studios, in New York City. It follows a tempo of 98 beats per minute, slightly faster than the original version. The track was included on the soundtrack of the brazilian telenovela Celebridade. It is set in the key of E♭ major, and follows the chord progression G_{m7}–C_{m7}–E♭_{maj9}–A♭. It was serviced to US urban contemporary and urban adult contemporary radio on June 13, 2004.

=== Critical reception ===
Sal Cinquemani of Slant Magazine called the song "dated" and wrote that it felt out of place on Dangerously in Love. Erika Ramirez of Billboard magazine also noted that "While the singer holds her own alongside the legend, the quiet storm duet feels out of place considering the electrifying feel of majority of the album." Neil Drumming of Entertainment Weekly said: "A remake of 'The Closer I Get to You' with Luther Vandross also sounds, sadly, a little dated." Spence D. of IGN commented "By the time Beyoncé has teamed up with the granddaddy of contemporary love jams, Luthor Vandross, on 'The Closer I Get To You', her album has descended into somewhat generic terrain. Sure, her vocals are on point and the music is adequately slick." Anthony DeCurtis of Rolling Stone wrote, "While she oozes charisma and has a fine voice, Beyoncé isn't in a class with the likes of Whitney Houston or Mariah Carey as a singer, a fact that 'The Closer I Get to You', her duet with the effortlessly smooth Luther Vandross, also makes clear."

Jason King of Vibe magazine wrote that Beyoncé had some "cojones" to follow up a Jay-Z duet with a Luther Vandross duet on the album's track-listing. Rob Fitzpatrick of NME stated that "it's the irredeemably cheesy ballad with 80s cornball Luther Vandross that will make the voices in your head demand hot, fresh blood." By contrast, Lewis Dene of BBC gave the song a positive review, stating that it is guaranteed the number one slot on the US R&B charts. Consequence of Sound's Chris Coplan noted that the song contained "unintentional cheesy vibe, [which] seems way more heart-wrenching now [in 2013] than it did a decade ago" and added that Beyoncé's vocals contained a "real sweetness and innocence". Pamelia S. Phillips, the author of Singing for Dummies, credited Beyoncé's vocal performance on "The Closer I Get to You" as one of her best. Mark Anthony Neal of PopMatters gave Beyoncé and Vandross "vocal props" for their performance in the "quiet storm", but described the overall performance as flat. During the 46th Annual Grammy Awards, this version of "The Closer I Get to You" won the Grammy Award for Best R&B Performance by a Duo or Group with Vocals.

=== Commercial performance ===
Beyoncé and Vandross' cover of "The Closer I Get to You" debuted at number 76 on the US Hot R&B/Hip-Hop Singles and Tracks chart dated July 24, 2004. The next week it moved up to number 68, and on August 7 it peaked at number 62. The track spent a total of twenty weeks on the chart. On the airplay component of this chart, the Hot R&B/Hip-Hop Airplay, "The Closer I Get to You" spent eight weeks and reached a peak of number 60. The song would later be certified gold by the Recording Industry Association of America (RIAA) for equivalent sales of 500,000 units in the United States.

=== Formats and track listings ===
- US promotional CD single
1. "The Closer I Get to You" (radio edit) – 4:26
2. "The Closer I Get to You" (instrumental) – 6:28
3. "The Closer I Get to You" (call out hook) – 0:10

=== Credits and personnel ===
Credits taken from Dangerously in Love liner notes.

- Lead Vocals: B. Knowles, L. Vandross
  - Background Vocals: Cissy Houston, Tawatha Agee, Brenda White-King, Candace Thomas
- Writing: J. Mtume, R. Lucas
- Recording: Stan Wallace
- Vocal engineer: Nat Adderley Jr., Skip Anderson
- Mix engineer: Ray Bardani
- Drums: Ivan Hampden Jr.
- Bass: Byron Miller
- Guitars: Phil Hamilton
- Percussion: Bashiri Johnson
- Electric piano: Nat Adderley Jr.
- Sound programing and additional keyboards: Skip Anderson
- Strings: Al Brown
  - String Arrangement: Nat Adderley Jr.
- Concert Master: Sanford Allen
- Producing: Nat Adderley Jr.

=== Charts ===
Chart performance for "The Closer I Get to You"
| Chart (2004) | Peak position |
|---|---|
| US R&B/Hip-Hop Airplay (Billboard) | 60 |
| US Hot R&B/Hip-Hop Songs (Billboard) | 63 |

=== Certifications ===
| Region | Certification | Certified units/sales |
|---|---|---|
| United States (RIAA) | Gold | 500,000^{‡} |
^{‡} Sales+streaming figures based on certification alone.

== Other versions ==
"The Closer I Get To You" has been covered many times. Among the more notable versions are the following:

- In 1990, Toshinobu Kubota and Lynn Davis performed a live duet rendition of the song.
- Fourplay's cover of the song was described as an "undistinguished version" of the original song by AllMusic's Steven McDonald.
- In 2005, Nina Girado covered the song with Thor for her album live album Nina Live!. A writer of The Philippine Star noted that Thor "matches Nina note for note on their duet". Girado's version of the song won in the category for Best Duet Award at the Awit Awards in 2006.
- It was covered by Filipino acoustic band MYMP on their 2005 album Versions, with lyrics separately sung by Chin Alcantara and Juris Fernandez.

== See also ==
- List of RPM number-one singles of 1978
- List of number-one R&B singles of 1978 (U.S.)
