= Sullivan Correctional Facility =

Maximum-security state prison for male prisoners, located in New York, US

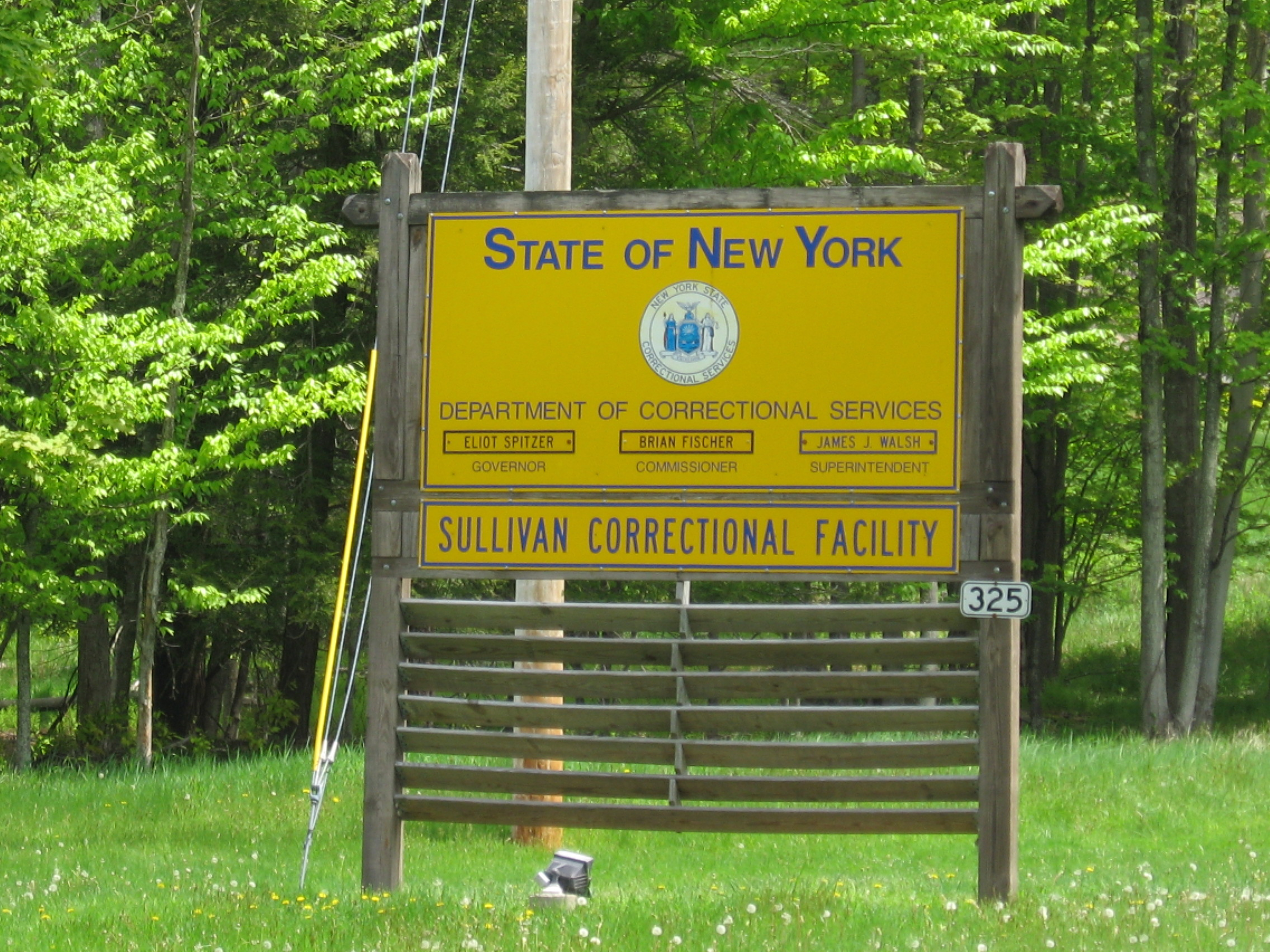
- Sign outside the prison
- Interactive map of Sullivan Correctional Facility
- Location: 325 Riverside Drive Fallsburg, New York; 41°44.5′N 74°35.367′W
- Status: Closed
- Security class: Maximum security prison
- Capacity: 763 (as of 2006)
- Opened: 1985
- Closed: November 6, 2024
- Managed by: New York State Department of Corrections and Community Supervision

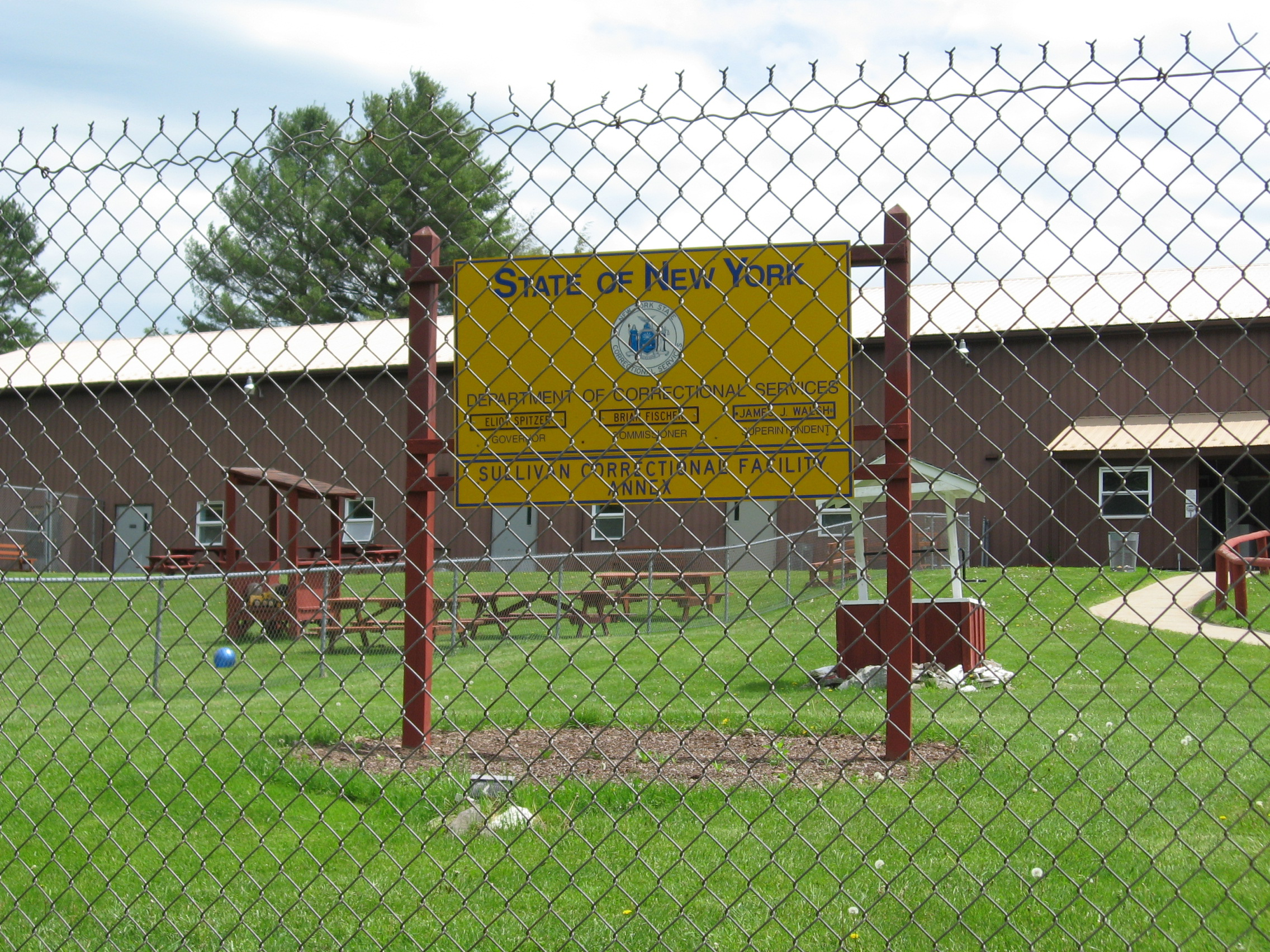
The prison annex

Sullivan Correctional Facility was a New York State maximum security prison correctional facility for male prisoners located in Fallsburg, New York. It is operated by the New York State Department of Corrections and Community Supervision. New York State announced its official closure date as November 6, 2024, with the inmates currently housed to be transferred to other facilities within New York State by that time.

Sullivan is located on an 850-acre (3.4 km^{2}) stretch of land that also contains Woodbourne Correctional Facility, a medium-security prison. The state appropriated funding for Sullivan after the loss of Rikers Island as a state facility in 1980 (the facility was returned to New York City). The buildings were built on a sharp upslope overlooking the Neversink River valley.

In order to build access roads to the prison, the New York State Department of Correctional Services purchased the Lebowitz Pine View Hotel, the 62 acre (0.25 km^{2}) adjoining property, in 1983. Originally, some prisoners from the Woodbourne facility were transferred and housed in the hotel buildings, which were operated as a Woodbourne annex until the completion of Sullivan in 1985. It operated as a minimum security Sullivan annex until 2010 when the annex portion was closed.

Sullivan houses between 560 and 580 inmates in four pods, arranged in a circle. Eighty-six percent of those inmates are being incarcerated for committing violent felonies, and 60% are serving life sentences

Hudson Link for Higher Education in Prison, a not-for-profit organization was founded to provide college education to incarcerated people in an effort to help reduce recidivism and poverty, while strengthening families and communities. In 1998, as part of the get-tough-on-crime campaign, state and federal funding for college programs inside prison was stopped. Understanding the positive effects of education in the transformation and rehabilitation of incarcerated people, inmates at Sing Sing Correctional Facility reached out to religious and academic volunteers to develop a college-degree granting program. Under the leadership of Dr. Anne Reissner, Hudson Link for Higher Education in Prison was founded to restore college education at Sing Sing through private funding. Hudson Link now runs pre-college and college degree programs at Fishkill, Greene, Sing Sing, Sullivan, and Taconic Correctional Facilities.

== Notable inmates ==
- David Berkowitz – the "Son of Sam" serial killer who terrorized New York City in 1977, serving 6 life sentences in Shawangunk Correctional Facility
- Nicholas Brooks – killed his girlfriend Sylvie Cachay and sentenced to 25 years to life.
- Robert Chambers – the "Preppie Killer" serving a 19-year sentence on a drug charge. Chambers was housed at Shawangunk Correctional Facility until his release in July 2023.
- Ronald DeFeo Jr. – killed his entire family and sparked the writing of The Amityville Horror. Serving 6 concurrent sentences of 25 years to life, he died on March 15, 2021.
- Abraham Hirschfeld – New York parking garage magnate convicted of hiring a hitman to kill his business partner of 40 years. Sentenced to 3 years, served 2. He was released in 2002, and died in 2005.
- Larme Price – serving a life sentence for murdering four immigrants in 2003, with the motivation being revenge for the September 11 attacks.
- Arthur Shawcross – the Genesee River Killer, died November 10, 2008.
