= Blue Lights in the Basement =

Studio album by Roberta Flack
- Released: December 13, 1977
- Length: 41:14
- Label: Atlantic
- Producer: Rubina Flake; Joe Ferla; Gene McDaniels

Roberta Flack chronology
| Feel Like Makin' Love (1975) | Blue Lights in the Basement (1977) | Roberta Flack (1978) |

Singles from Blue Lights in the Basement
- 1. "25th of Last December"/"Why Don't You Move in with Me" Released: November 30, 1977; 2. "The Closer I Get to You"/"Love Is the Healing" Released: February 4, 1978

Blue Lights in the Basement is the sixth studio album by American singer Roberta Flack, released by Atlantic Records on December 13, 1977. A commercial success, it peaked at number eight on the US Billboard 200, becoming her third top-ten album on the chart, while also reaching number five on the R&B albums chart. In February 1978, it was certified Gold by the Recording Industry Association of America (RIAA) for shipments over 500,000 copies.

The album features the single "The Closer I Get to You", a duet with Flack's friend and fellow soul musician Donny Hathaway, which became the biggest hit from the album, peaking at number two on the Billboard Hot 100, and reaching number one on the Hot Soul Singles chart. The collaboration with Hathaway would be one of his final singles released in his lifetime before his death in 1979.

== Background ==
Blue Lights in the Basement was produced by Flack along with Joe Ferla and Gene McDaniels. The track "After You," a song released originally by Diana Ross in 1976, would be the first of several Michael Masser compositions Flack would record (with the 1983 Peabo Bryson duet "Tonight, I Celebrate My Love" becoming a million-seller). In 2008, she would cite "After You" as one of her favorite recordings.

== Critical reception ==
Professional ratings
Review scores
| Source | Rating |
|---|---|
| AllMusic | 3.5/5 stars |

AllMusic editor Jason Elias found that the "album finds Flack responding to [...] changing times with a batch of smooth tracks and a polished and accomplished production. Of course by this time, she seemed to be divorced from the intelligent and recondite work that typified the early part of her career. Some of the tracks here do come close to that style [...] Flack is indeed in great voice here, but Blue Lights in the Basement is most notable for its hit single rather than the tracks that surround it."

Billboard worte: "Roberta's back in time for Christmas with a strong seasonal tune that could be a classic wrapped up in an LP containing nine other soft, warm ballads that are impeccably produced and arranged, but lacking the drama of her previous hits. Her voice shines through the orchestration, however."

== Commercial performance ==
Blue Lights in the Basement was a commercial success, peaking at number eight on the US Billboard 200, becoming her third top-ten album on the chart. It also reached number five on the R&B albums chart. On February 27, 1978, the album received a Gold certification by the Recording Industry Association of America (RIAA) for shipments over 500,000 copies.

== Track listing ==
Blue Lights in the Basement track listing
| No. | Title | Writer(s) | Length |
|---|---|---|---|
| 1. | "Why Don't You Move in with Me" | Gene McDaniels | 4:51 |
| 2. | "The Closer I Get to You" (duet with Donny Hathaway) | Reggie Lucas; James Mtume | 4:39 |
| 3. | "Fine, Fine Day" | Rachel Perry | 4:49 |
| 4. | "This Time I'll Be Sweeter" | Haras Fyre; Gwen Guthrie | 4:23 |
| 5. | "25th of Last December" | McDaniels | 4:31 |
| 6. | "After You" | Michael Masser; Ron Miller | 3:55 |
| 7. | "I'd Like to Be Baby to You" | Morgan Ames | 4:27 |
| 8. | "Soul Deep" | Wayne Carson | 2:22 |
| 9. | "Love Is the Healing" | McDaniels | 3:42 |
| 10. | "Where I'll Find You" | David McHugh | 3:10 |
| Total length: | | | 41:14 |

== Personnel ==
Performers and musicians

- Roberta Flack – lead vocals, backing vocals, keyboards, arrangements
- Paul Griffin, Don Grolnick, Rob Mounsey – keyboards
- Ronnie Foster – keyboards, synthesizers, backing vocals
- Leon Pendarvis – keyboards, backing vocals, musical arrangements
- Harry Whitaker – keyboards, musical arrangements
- Hugh McCracken – guitar, musical arrangements
- Reggie Lucas, Jeff Mironov, David Spinozza, John Tropea – guitars
- Basil Fearrington, Anthony Jackson, Will Lee – electric bass
- Gary King – electric bass, musical arrangements
- Steve Gadd, Howard King, Idris Muhammad, Allan Schwartzberg, Jimmy Wong – drums
- Errol "Crusher" Bennett, David Carey, Jimmy Maelen – percussion
- James Mtume – percussion, backing vocals
- Michael Kamen – oboe solo (10), musical arrangements
- Donny Hathaway – lead vocals (2)
- Jim Gilstrap, Lani Groves, Gwen Guthrie, Yvonne Lewis, Gene McDaniels, Zach Sanders, Brenda White, & Deniece Williams – backing vocals

Technical

- Joe Ferla – producer, engineer, remixing
- Rubina Flake & Gene McDaniels – producers
- Ahmet Ertegun – executive producer
- Brian Christian, Mike Moran, Ralph Moss, Phil Schier, & Ted Spencer – engineers
- Jack Adelman – mastering
- Stewart Bosley & Gazebo Group – album design
- Dave Gahr – back photography
- John Pinderhughes – front photography

Studios

- Recorded at The Hit Factory, Columbia Recording Studios, RCA Studios, and Record Plant N.Y.C. (New York, NY); Record Plant and Westlake Audio (Los Angeles, CA); Kendun Recorders (Burbank, CA); P.S. Recording Studios (Chicago, IL).

== Charts ==
Weekly chart performance for Blue Lights in the Basement
| Chart (1977) | Peak position |
|---|---|
| US Billboard 200 | 8 |
| US Top R&B/Hip-Hop Albums (Billboard) | 5 |

== Certifications ==
Certifications for Blue Lights in the Basement
| Region | Certification | Certified units/sales |
|---|---|---|
| United States (RIAA) | Gold | 500,000^{^} |
^{^} Shipments figures based on certification alone.
