= The Hound of the Baskervilles (1978 film) =

- Film poster
- Directed by: Paul Morrissey
- Written by: Peter Cook, Dudley Moore & Paul Morrissey (screenplay)
- Based on: The Hound of the Baskervilles; 1902 novel by Sir Arthur Conan Doyle
- Produced by: John Goldstone
- Starring: Peter Cook; Dudley Moore
- Cinematography: Dick Bush; John Wilcox
- Edited by: Glenn Hyde; Richard Marden
- Music by: Dudley Moore
- Distributed by: Atlantic Releasing Corporation
- Release date: 21 July 1978 (West Germany)
- Running time: 85 minutes
- Country: United Kingdom
- Language: English

The Hound of the Baskervilles is a 1978 British comedy film spoofing the 1902 novel The Hound of the Baskervilles by Sir Arthur Conan Doyle. It stars Peter Cook as Sherlock Holmes and Dudley Moore as Dr. Watson. A number of other well-known British comedy actors appear in the film, including Terry-Thomas and Kenneth Williams.

== Plot ==
The film begins in a theatre, where a pianist begins to play a piano accompaniment to the actual film being shown in the theater.

Holmes has just restored a stolen artifact to three French nuns, and is later called on a case by Dr. Mortimer concerning Sir Henry Baskerville and a legendary hound that curses the Baskerville estate. Tired and worn out by so many cases, Holmes passes the case onto Dr. Watson, who is portrayed as a Welsh eccentric.

On their way from the station to the hall, Sir Henry, Dr. Mortimer, Watson and Perkins (their driver) are halted by a policeman, who warns them of a murderer stalking the moors, before sending the group on their way.

While out in the moor collecting specimens, Watson has a curious encounter in a hut with the raving Mr. Frankland and Frankland's exceedingly strong lover, Mary.

In the next scene, we see Holmes still in London, visiting Ada, his mother, who, as a bogus spiritualist aided by her housekeeper, Iris, scams older ladies of their money in false seances. Holmes' mother is concerned that "Watty" (Watson) may need help, and that "Sherl" (as she calls her son), should rush to his aid.

In next scene, Holmes interviews the one-legged Mr. Spiggot (also played by Dudley Moore) to act as a runner on the moor.

In the next scene, while wandering on the moors, Watson happens upon Mr. Stapleton, who mistakes him for Sir Henry. Stapleton's sister describes dramatically her encounter with the Hound on the moor, suggesting that it ravished her, whereupon she attempts to force herself upon the reluctant Watson, with Miss Stapleton undergoing supernatural transformations reminiscent of The Exorcist.

The Barrymores at Baskerville Hall mistreat Sir Henry and Watson, feeding them only cheese and water and then throwing them into a small bedroom, ankle-deep in water. Watson then goes to the village to send a message to Holmes (who is during this time visiting his cranky mother), and meets Mr. Stapleton of Merripit Hall. Stapleton is carrying a chihuahua that proceeds to urinate in Watson's pocket and face.

Arriving at Merripit Hall, Watson meets the eccentric Mrs. Stapleton, who displays surreal symptoms suggesting demonic possession. Late at night, Sir Henry and Watson discover the Stapletons and the escaped murderer, whom Watson recognizes as Mrs. Barrymore's brother Ethel Seldon, having a family dinner. Oddly enough, neither of the men seems to panic at this.

Afterward, Holmes arrives and examines the case so far. An invitation arrives for Sir Henry, asking him to dinner at Merripit Hall. Suspecting a trap, Watson goes along with Sir Henry while Holmes observes carefully. Mrs. Stapleton resumes her bizarre acts and begins to vomit pale-blue liquid over Sir Henry, whilst Mr. Stapleton's chihuahua urinates in Watson's soup.

Ordered to leave in disgrace, the Stapletons, Dr. Mortimer, Mr. Frankland, and Mary follow Sir Henry and Watson to kill them, but become trapped in a quagmire. Holmes then proceeds to reveal that the Hound is no more than a large, rather friendly Irish Wolfhound owned by the late Sir Charles Baskerville, whose excited barking was misinterpreted as a monstrous beast. He also states that the dog is the sole heir of Sir Charles. With the dog gone, the would-be murderers would have gained the Baskerville fortune and the estate.

The film ends on the pianist, who is then hit by vegetables from the audience.

== Cast ==
- Peter Cook as Sherlock Holmes
- Dudley Moore as Doctor Watson / Mr. Spiggot / Mrs. Ada Holmes / Piano Player
- Denholm Elliott as Stapleton
- Joan Greenwood as Beryl Stapleton
- Hugh Griffith as Frankland
- Irene Handl as Mrs. Barrymore
- Terry-Thomas as Dr. Mortimer
- Max Wall as Arthur Barrymore
- Kenneth Williams as Sir Henry Baskerville
- Roy Kinnear as Ethel Seldon
- Dana Gillespie as Mary
- Lucy Griffiths as Iris
- Penelope Keith as Massage-Parlour Receptionist
- Jessie Matthews as Mrs. Tinsdale
- Prunella Scales as Glynis
- Josephine Tewson as Nun
- Rita Webb as Elder Masseuse
- Henry Woolf as Shopkeeper
- Spike Milligan as Policeman
- Ava Cadell as Marsha

== Filming locations ==
The film was shot at Bray Studios and on location in neighbouring Oakley Court, as the manor house.

== Reception ==
The film received overwhelmingly negative reviews, being described variously as "a chore" and "a ponderous shambles", with much of the blame being laid at Morrissey's direction, especially given the substantial comedic talent involved. Virtually the entire cast consisted of comic actors who were well-known and respected in the UK and overseas. Perhaps because of this, it went unreleased until 1981 in the United States.

It has a 0% rating at Rotten Tomatoes.
