= Joseph Brooks (songwriter) =

American director and composer (1938–2011)

- Brooks in 1978 as he appeared in If Ever I See You Again
- Born: Joseph Kaplan; March 11, 1938; New York City, U.S.
- Died: May 22, 2011 (aged 73); New York City, U.S.
- Cause of death: Suicide by asphyxia
- Other names: Joe Brooks; Joey Brooks
- Children: 4, including Amanda and Nicholas Brooks
- Musical career
- Genres: Pop; Score; Jingle
- Occupations: Composer, director, producer, screenwriter, musician
- Instrument: Piano

Joseph Brooks (born Joseph Kaplan; March 11, 1938 – May 22, 2011) was an American songwriter, composer, and filmmaker. He was a successful author of commercial jingles during the 1960s, before pivoting to a filmmaking career. His 1977 romantic drama You Light Up My Life, which he wrote, directed, produced, and scored, spawned the hit song of the same name, earning Brooks an Academy Award, Golden Globe Award, and a Grammy Award.

Brooks became the subject of an investigation after being accused of a series of rapes. He was indicted in 2009, but killed himself on May 22, 2011, before his trial.

== Early life and singing career ==
Brooks was born Joseph Kaplan on March 11, 1938, to Jewish parents in Manhattan, and grew up in Manhattan and Lawrence, Long Island, New York. In later interviews, he claimed to have started playing piano at age 3 and writing plays at age 5, following his parents' divorce. As a child, he also developed a stutter that, according to his production partner Robert K. Lifton, disappeared when Brooks sang or acted. He later attended five different colleges, including Juilliard, but did not graduate from any.

In the late 1950s, Brooks pursued a career as a singer-songwriter, adopting the name "Joey Brooks" (later changed to "Joe Brooks" or "Joseph Brooks"). He released several albums on Canadian-American Records as Joey Brooks, and on Decca as "Joey Brooks and the Baroque Folk". When his singing career failed, he drifted into advertising and occasional songwriting work, although he sporadically released several more records throughout the 1960s and 1970s.

== Advertising, film and stage career ==
In the 1960s, Brooks composed advertising jingles for clients including Pepsi ("You've Got a Lot to Live") and Maxwell House ("Good to the Last Drop Feeling"). He received numerous Clio Awards for his work, as well as a People's Choice Award. Credited as "Joey Brooks", he also wrote the song "My Ship Is Comin' In", a Top Ten UK hit in 1966 for the Walker Brothers.

In the 1970s, after becoming wealthy from his advertising work (at one point claiming to have 150 commercials on the air), Brooks began composing for films. He wrote music for the American release of The Garden of the Finzi-Continis (1970), Marjoe (1972), and The Lords of Flatbush (1974), in which he was also an investor. He wrote "Blue Balloon (The Hourglass Song)", sung by Robby Benson as the theme song for the film Jeremy (1973), and claimed to have written, cast, and directed most of Jeremy, although Arthur Barron is the sole writer and director of record. New York Times film critic Roger Greenspun recognized Brooks's claim, writing, "it seems fair to suggest that, in whatever proportion, both men were involved in the authorship of the film."

Brooks next developed his own film project, You Light Up My Life, which he wrote, produced, directed, and scored on a budget of about $1 million. The romantic drama about an aspiring singer, starring Didi Conn, was a box-office success despite poor reviews. Brooks's title song for the film was an even bigger success; a cover version by Debby Boone reached #1 on the U.S. Billboard Hot 100 chart and held that position for 10 consecutive weeks, at that time tied for the longest Number One reign in the chart's history. With sales of over five million copies, the song was the biggest hit of the 1970s and earned Brooks a Grammy Award for Song of the Year, an Academy Award for Best Original Song, a Golden Globe Award, and an American Society of Composers, Authors and Publishers (ASCAP) award.

Brooks attempted to follow up his success with a similar romantic drama, If Ever I See You Again (1978), which he not only co-wrote, produced, directed, and scored, but also starred in, as a composer of TV commercial jingles much like himself, despite no significant acting experience. The title song became a moderate hit for Roberta Flack, peaking at #24 on the Hot 100 chart, but the movie received very bad reviews and was a box-office bomb. Brooks was subsequently involved in several other films, directing and scoring Invitation to the Wedding (1983), in which Ralph Richardson and John Gielgud appeared, and co-producing Eddie and the Cruisers (1983) (which he did not score). In the late 1990s, he and his then-wife Christina Bone began developing a film titled Sara's Life Before It Became a Movie, which was never released.

Brooks also worked on stage productions, composing and writing for the 1989 West End musical adaptation of Metropolis and writing, directing, and producing the Broadway musical In My Life (2005), a love story about a Village Voice personals editor with obsessive-compulsive disorder and a musician with Tourette syndrome who are brought together by a jingle-singing God. Robert Simonson wrote in Brooks's Playbill obituary that In My Life was "generally regarded as one of the strangest shows ever to have graced a Broadway stage." When it was panned by critics, including Ben Brantley of The New York Times, who called it "jaw-dropping moments of whimsy run amok", Brooks spent $1.5 million on ads saying that the critics were wrong.

Many sources have called Brooks an egomaniac. His career was curtailed in 2008 by a stroke.

== Sexual assault indictment ==
In June 2009, Brooks was arrested on charges of raping or sexually assaulting 11 women lured to his East Side apartment from 2005 to 2008. His assistant, Shawni Lucier, was charged with helping him.

"She picked the victims, set up travel arrangements, and reassured them," said Lisa Friel, chief of the district attorney's sex crimes unit. At times, she said, Lucier also reassured mothers worried about sending their daughters alone to New York on flights Brooks paid for. And, she said, Lucier was sometimes present in the apartment when the women arrived, but left before the assaults. At least four of the women accused Brooks of sexual assault. He allegedly lured the women to his apartment to audition for movie roles. According to Manhattan District Attorney Robert Morgenthau, the women responded to a notice Brooks had posted on Craigslist seeking attractive women to star in movie roles, and flew to New York from Pacific Coast states or Florida, usually at Brooks's expense.

Brooks was indicted on June 23, 2009. He was to be tried in the state Supreme Court for Manhattan (a trial-level court) on 91 counts of rape, sexual abuse, criminal sexual act, assault, and other charges. In December 2009, prosecutors said they would ask the grand jury to consider adding even more charges, in part because "additional victims" had come forward. Brooks committed suicide on May 22, 2011, before he could be tried.

Three days after Brooks's death, Lucier pleaded guilty to 10 counts of criminal facilitation.

== Personal life ==
Brooks was the older brother of Gilbert Kaplan, the founder of Institutional Investor magazine.

In 2008, Brooks had a stroke that left him unable to play the piano and diminished his ability to compose. It was reported that he may have had a second stroke shortly before his death.

Brooks was married four times, but was single at the time of his death. A 1978 news article noted that he was married with 7-year-old twins, a boy and a girl. In the late 1970s, Brooks married Susan Paul, an English model and actress who appeared in the films All That Jazz (1979) and Invitation to the Wedding (1983). They had two children during the 1980s and divorced in the early 1990s. Brooks later married Christina Bone.

In 1975, Brooks had a relationship with actress Cindy Williams, who was starring at the time in the movie The First Nudie Musical, written and co-directed by her friend Bruce Kimmel. Brooks became an investor in the film. He originally planned for her to star in You Light Up My Life, but he and Williams were already having relationship issues and he asked Kimmel to direct You Light Up My Life, saying he couldn't control Williams. He broke up with Williams before the film was made, and the role went to Didi Conn. In 2009, Brooks sued a 22-year-old ex-fiancée, claiming that he had spent $2 million on her before learning she was already married.

Brooks had four children: Amanda (born 1981) and Nicholas (born 1986) (both with Susan Paul), Gabrielle, and Jeffrey. Amanda has said that Brooks abused her as a child and that she and Nicholas had a difficult relationship with him. At the time of Brooks's death, Nicholas, a former student at the University of Colorado, was awaiting trial in New York City for the murder of his girlfriend, swimwear designer Sylvie Cachay, in a Soho House hotel room on December 9, 2010. On July 11, 2013, Nicholas was convicted of Cachay's murder. He was sentenced to 25 years to life in prison in September.

== Death ==
On May 22, 2011, Brooks was found dead in his apartment on the Upper East Side of Manhattan, with a plastic bag over his head near a hose attached to a helium tank. A suicide note was nearby. According to a law enforcement source, Brooks wrote in the note that he would be exonerated of the charges against him, but complained about his failing health and a woman he claimed had abused him and taken his money.

Shortly before Brooks's death, a former friend sued to seize his condominium to pay off a $3.2 million debt, alleging that Brooks had put up his longtime home as collateral for a $2.4 million loan in 2006.

On May 23, 2011, a medical examiner ruled that Brooks had killed himself, citing asphyxia by helium.

== Partial list of credits ==
=== Film ===
- The Lords of Flatbush (1974) – Conductor, music arranger
- You Light Up My Life (1977) – Producer, director, writer and composer (1977)
- If Ever I See You Again (1978) – Producer, director, co-writer, composer and actor (1978)
- Headin' for Broadway (1980) – Director, co-writer
- Eddie and the Cruisers (1983) -- Producer
- Invitation to the Wedding (1983) – Director

=== Stage ===
- Metropolis (1989), West End musical – Composer, co-lyricist
- In My Life (2005), Broadway musical – Director, writer, composer and lyricist

== See also ==
- Grammy Award for Song of the Year
- Academy Award for Best Original Song
- You Light Up My Life (song)

== Sources ==
- Press, Jaques Cattell (Ed.). ASCAP Biographical Dictionary of Composers, Authors and Publishers, fourth edition, R. R. Bowker, 1980.
