= Murder of Sylvie Cachay =

Murder of a swimsuit designer in Manhattan, US

Sylvie Cachay
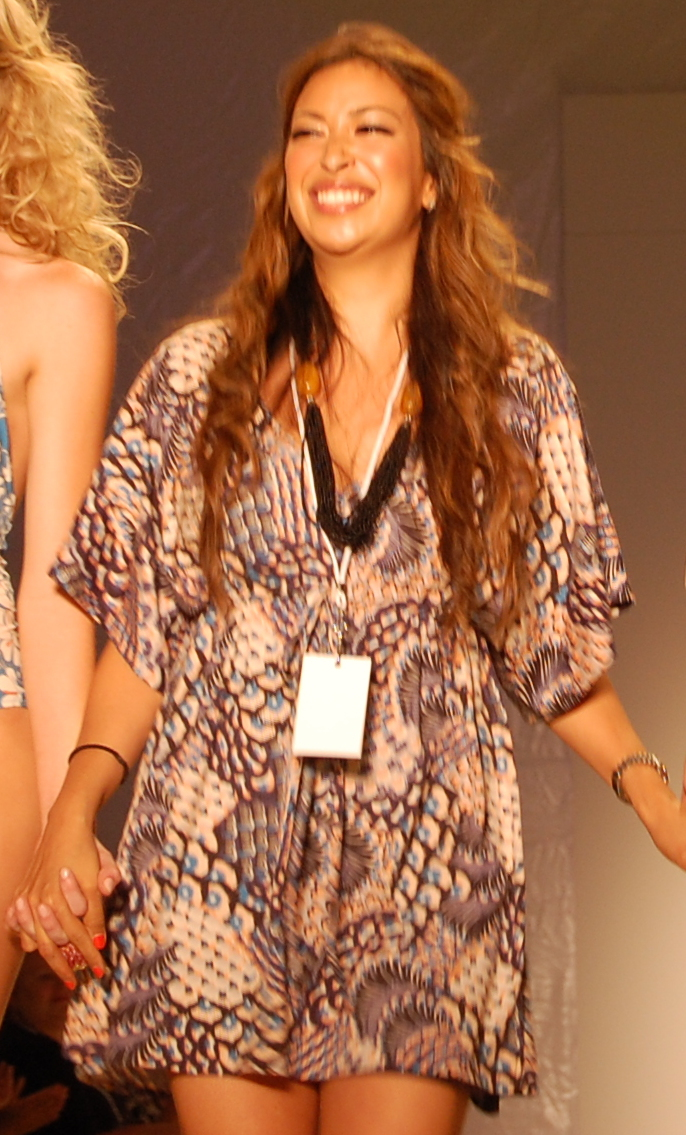
- Cachay in 2008
- Born: January 7, 1977; Arlington, Virginia
- Died: December 9, 2010 (aged 33); Manhattan, New York
- Cause of death: Strangulation; Drowning
- Citizenship: American, Peruvian
- Occupation: Fashion designer
- Known for: Swimsuit designing

Sylvie Cachay (January 7, 1977 — December 9, 2010) was a Peruvian American fashion designer known for having been the head of the swimsuit designing team at Victoria's Secret.

She was found strangled and drowned in a bathtub at the Soho House in Manhattan on December 9, 2010. Nicholas Brooks, her boyfriend of six months at the time, was convicted of her second degree murder in July 2013 and sentenced to 25 years to life on September 23, 2013.

== Early life and relationship ==
Cachay was born in Arlington, Virginia, to Antonio Cachay, a surgeon and otolaryngologist, and Sylvia Cachay, a painter. Sylvie was of Peruvian descent and a citizen of both the United States and Peru, growing up between Lima and McLean.

She received her degree in fashion design from Marymount College. She worked as a designer for both Marc Jacobs and Tommy Hilfiger before joining the design team at Victoria's Secret and becoming their head swimsuit designer. She worked there until 2006, when she left to start her own line of swimsuits, Syla. Sports Illustrated featured her designs in its swimsuit video. The company also appeared in numerous magazines, including Elle, InStyle, and Vogue. She went out of business in 2008 due to the Great Recession.

=== Relationship with Nicholas Brooks ===
Cachay met Nicholas Brooks, the son of composer Joseph Brooks, in 2010. Brooks had dropped out of college and was struggling to remain employed as he was leading a playboy lifestyle and was heavily involved with drugs. The two bonded after one of Sylvie's toy poodles was hit by a car. Their relationship was volatile; they frequently broke up, made amends, and got back together. A friend of Cachay's, Alicia Bell, testified that "as long as I've known her, she's never been in a relationship this dramatic".

== Death ==
Cachay and Brooks arrived at the Soho House hotel at around 12:30 am on December 9, 2010. Cachay told the front desk clerk that her "stoner" boyfriend had accidentally set fire to their apartment after leaving lit candles behind the bed while high on drugs. They were able to put out the fire, but did not want to stay in the apartment due to the smoky smell. She also told the clerk that she was tired and unable to stay awake after she had taken a Xanax. A concierge was appointed to assist her to Room 20. The concierge later said that as she left the room, she had heard Cachay and Brooks arguing.

=== Discovery of body ===
Around 2:00 am, the hotel staff received multiple complaints of water dripping through the floor of Room 20. They knocked on the door and nobody answered. Letting themselves into the room, they discovered Cachay's body submerged in an overflowing bathtub. She was wearing a turtleneck sweater, pink underwear, and a Rolex watch. After efforts to revive her, paramedics pronounced her dead on the scene at 3:33 am. The police, examining her body, found wounds on her neck that were consistent with strangulation, hemorrhaging in her eyes, and a bite mark on her hand.

=== Autopsy ===
The initial autopsy conducted on Cachay's body proved inconclusive. After both a tissue and toxicology test were performed, the medical examiner ruled her death a homicide, saying that Cachay had been held underwater in the bathtub and strangled.

== Investigation and trial ==
Immediately after the discovery of Cachay's body, police questioned Brooks. He told them he had run into someone he knew in the hotel lobby and they had left to buy drinks. He was arrested and charged with her death on December 9 after the police obtained a warrant to search his body for DNA evidence; the investigators only found her DNA on the faucet in the bathtub where Cachay was killed.

During the trial, Cachay's friends testified that Brooks had been hiring prostitutes while dating her, sometimes using her credit card to do so; she became aware of this shortly before her death. Less than 24 hours before her murder, she had sent Brooks an email with the header "fuck you", confronting him about the suspicious activity on her credit card and threatening to report him to the police.

Brooks pleaded not guilty, but was convicted of second-degree murder in July 2013. He was sentenced to 25 years to life in prison. According to presiding Judge Bonnie Wittner, she could have sentenced Brooks to 15 years to life, but instead selected the higher punishment because the murder was a "singularly horrific and tragic event". Since his conviction, Brooks has been housed in Fallsburg, New York, at the Sullivan Correctional Facility.

On March 22, 2018, in a unanimous ruling by the New York Court of Appeals, Brooks lost his final appeal of his conviction. The court noted that both security camera footage and the presence of Brooks's DNA in the hotel bathroom placed him at the Soho House directly before the discovery of Cachay's body. He is eligible for parole in 2038.
