= You Light Up My Life (film) =

1977 film by Joseph Brooks

- Theatrical poster
- Directed by: Joseph Brooks
- Written by: Joseph Brooks
- Produced by: Joseph Brooks
- Starring: Didi Conn; Joe Silver; Michael Zaslow; Stephen Nathan; Melanie Mayron
- Cinematography: Eric Saarinen
- Edited by: Lynzee Klingman
- Music by: Joseph Brooks
- Production company: Mondial International
- Distributed by: Columbia Pictures
- Release date: August 31, 1977
- Running time: 90 minutes
- Country: United States
- Language: English
- Budget: $1.2 million
- Box office: $8.5 million

You Light Up My Life is a 1977 American romantic drama film written, produced, scored, and directed by Joseph Brooks. It stars Didi Conn, Joe Silver, and Michael Zaslow. The film follows a young singer and songwriter who feels obligated to follow her father's borscht belt comedian career. She struggles to get small time acting work in advertising and children's shows with her fellow acting friends in Hollywood and shows marginal talent in standup comedy (mostly set up using her father's connections). Her happenstance meeting with a young director sets the stage for a series of conflicts with her fiancé, father and career decisions.

On initial release, the film received widespread negative reviews from critics, though it was a commercial success. However, the film's soundtrack proved a hit and the title song (written by Brooks and sung for the film by Kasey Cisyk) won multiple accolades including the Academy Award for Best Original Song. A cover version by Debby Boone became a major hit, winning the 1978 Grammy Award for Song of the Year and becoming the single biggest hit of the decade.

== Plot ==
Laurie Robinson (Didi Conn) is a young woman who earns a living by performing in commercials and hosting a children's show on public television, but she would rather concentrate on songwriting and singing than doing comedy with her small-time comedian father Si (Joe Silver). One night, Laurie goes to a restaurant where she meets a young film director, Chris Nolan (Michael Zaslow); she drives him back to his apartment and they spend the night together. The next morning, Laurie confesses to Chris that she is engaged and has to be at her wedding rehearsal. He asks if the previous night was just a final fling before marriage, and she says she cannot see him anymore.

Laurie later meets with her fiancé, Ken Rothenberg (Stephen Nathan), and attends a recording session where she records her song, then sings background vocals and directs the musicians during overdubs. From there, she goes to the wedding rehearsal where Si has arranged an elaborate setup with an old friend who owns the Wedding Palace. The next day, Laurie auditions for a film that needs a singing voice for the leading lady. The director, she discovers, is Chris, who is as surprised as she is. Chris asks to see the songs in her portfolio. Laurie's voice and the orchestra's performance of her song "You Light Up My Life" impresses everyone, and Chris asks her if she would be interested in auditioning for the lead in his movie.

Later, Chris sings "You Light Up My Life" for Laurie at his piano, giving it a more subdued treatment, then takes her for a walk along the beach. Laurie visits her best friend Annie (Melanie Mayron) to confess that she loves Chris, and adds that she may have the lead in his film. Meanwhile, when Laurie meets with Ken to call off the wedding, Chris auditions another girl for his movie and tells her she has the part, then gives his assistant the job of calling Laurie with the bad news. When Laurie asks why Chris did not call himself, the assistant explains that Chris has been in meetings all afternoon, and when she calls Chris's office, the receptionist tells her he is probably at home because he does not have any meetings. Laurie arrives at Chris's apartment as he and his new leading lady are leaving for dinner with friends. He apologizes and tells her she is special enough to get other roles.

Later that night, when Laurie and Si perform at the Family Komedy Hour, her routine falls flat, tears flood her eyes and she walks off. In the dressing room, Laurie tells Si she hates the act because she is not funny, all she wants to do is sing and that Columbia Records is interested in her. She gives Si a cassette tape of her songs and tells him he has to let go of her, because she needs to depend on herself; she is going to New York City alone. They hug and kiss goodbye, and Laurie drives away. Sometime later, Laurie's song "You Light Up My Life" climbs the music charts and reaches number one.

== Cast ==
- Didi Conn as Laurie Robinson
- Joe Silver as Si Robinson
- Michael Zaslow as Chris Nolan
- Stephen Nathan as Ken Rothenberg
- Melanie Mayron as Annie Gerrard
- Jerry Keller as Conductor
- Lisa Reeves as Carla Wright
- John Gowans as Charley Nelson
- Simmy Bow as Mr. Granek
- Bernice Nicholson as Mrs. Granek
- Ed Morgan as Account Executive
- Joseph Brooks as Creative Director (credited as Joe Brooks)
- Amy Letterman as Laurie
- Marty Zagon as Mr. Nussbaum
- Martin Gish as Harold Nussbaum
- Ken Olfson as 1st Commercial Director

== Production ==
The film was picked up by Columbia who spent $10,000 on shooting a new, more positive ending, and $2.8 million on marketing.

== Reception ==
The film was widely panned by critics, garnering a 20% fresh rating on Rotten Tomatoes. Some cited Didi Conn's sensitive portrayal and the title song as its most worthwhile features.

== Accolades ==
Award	Category	Song title	Recipient	Result	Ref.
Academy Awards	Best Original Song	"You Light Up My Life"	Joseph Brooks	Won	
Golden Globe Awards	Best Original Song	"You Light Up My Life"	Joseph Brooks	Won	
Grammy Awards	Record of the Year	"You Light Up My Life"	Joseph Brooks	Nominated	
Grammy Awards	Song of the Year	"You Light Up My Life"	Joseph Brooks	Won (Note: Tied with "Evergreen (Love Theme from A Star Is Born)".)	
Grammy Awards	Best Original Score Written for a Motion Picture or a Television Special	"You Light Up My Life"	Joseph Brooks	Nominated	

The film is recognized by American Film Institute in these lists:

- 2004: AFI's 100 Years...100 Songs:
  - "You Light Up My Life" – Nominated

== Soundtrack ==
You Light Up My Life: Original Soundtrack

Soundtrack album by Joseph Brooks and Kasey Cisyk
- Released: October 1977
- Recorded: 1977
- Studios: A&R Recording Studios; New York City
- Genres: Pop, film score
- Length: 26:18
- Label: Arista
- Producer: Joe Brooks

Singles from You Light Up My Life
- 1. "You Light Up My Life" Released: October 1977

The film soundtrack was composed, arranged and produced by Joseph "Joe" Brooks with lead vocals provided by Kasey Cisyk and released in October 1977 by Arista Records.

Originally released on LP, cassette and 8-track tape, the soundtrack album peaked at #17 on the Billboard 200 chart in November 1977, was certified Gold by the Recording Industry Association of America (RIAA) and also nominated for a Grammy Award for Best Original Score Written for a Motion Picture or a Television Special.

The title song "You Light Up My Life", performed by Kvitka Cisyk for the film's soundtrack and later recorded by Debby Boone, received the Academy Award for Best Original Song and a Golden Globe Award for Best Original Song as well as the Grammy Award for Song of the Year. In the film, the song was lip synched by actress Didi Conn. Kvitka Cisyk also has a small part in the film as a wedding attendant.

Cisyk's original soundtrack recording of "You Light Up My Life" was included on the soundtrack album which was rush-released by Arista Records after Boone included her version on her first solo album (also entitled You Light Up My Life) and within less than three weeks, the soundtrack album was certified Gold by the RIAA, making it one of the fastest-breaking records in the label's history at that time.

Boone's single reached #1 on the Billboard Hot 100 chart for a then record-setting 10 consecutive weeks while Cisyk's version of the song was released simultaneously as a single to bolster sales of the soundtrack album. Cisyk's single was credited to "Original Cast", not to Cisyk herself, and although Brooks is listed on the A-side, the "Original Cast" B-side charted on the Billboard Hot 100 and only reached #80. Brooks also released an instrumental version of the song from the soundtrack as a promotional single, but that version failed to chart.

Following the huge success of Boone's hit version of the song (which was not included on the soundtrack album) and with sales of over five million copies of the single, "You Light Up My Life" ultimately became the biggest hit of the 1970s.

=== Track listing ===
All tracks composed by Joseph Brooks.

Side 1:

1. "You Light up My Life" (Kasey Cisyk) – 3:35
2. "The Morning of My Life" (Kasey Cisyk) – 1:50
3. "It's a Long Way from Brooklyn" (Kasey Cisyk) – 1:38
4. "Phone Call" – Joe Brooks (1:47)
5. "You Light Up My Life" (instrumental) (Joe Brooks) – 3:02

Side 2:

1. "Rolling the Chords" (Kasey Cisyk) – 2:52
2. "Do You Have a Piano" (Kasey Cisyk) – 3:32
3. "Ride to Chris' House" (Joe Brooks) – 0:59
4. "California Daydreams" (Kasey Cisyk and Joe Brooks) – 3:28
5. "You Light up My Life" (Kasey Cisyk) – 3:35

=== Personnel ===
- Composed, Arranged, Produced By – Joe Brooks
- Lead Vocalists – Kasey Cisyk, Joseph Brooks
- Background Vocalists – Jerry Keller, Lesley Miller, Kenny Karen, Kasey Cisyk, Ron Dante
- Recorded At – A&R Recording Studios, New York City
- Engineer [A&R Recording Studios] – Malcolm Addey

=== Charts ===
==== Weekly charts ====
Chart (1977/78)	Peak position
Australia (Kent Music Report)	94
Canada (RPM)(2 weeks @ 20)	20
United States (Billboard 200)	17

==== Year-end charts ====
Chart (1978)	Rank
Billboard Top Soundtrack Albums	10
