= You Light Up My Life (song) =

1977 single by Debby Boone

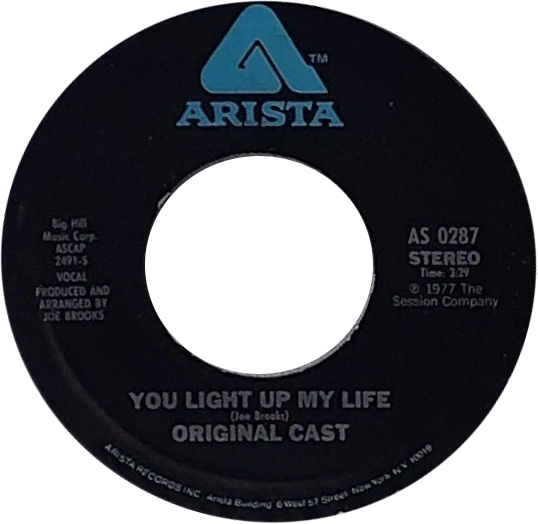
- Vocal side of the US single

Single by Kasey Cisyk (credited to Original Cast)

from the album You Light Up My Life: Original Soundtrack
- A-side: "You Light Up My Life"; (instrumental)
- Released: August 16, 1977 (Charted the week of September 3)
- Recorded: 1977
- Genre: Pop
- Length: 3:29
- Label: Arista
- Songwriter: Joe Brooks
- Producer: Joe Brooks

Music video
- "Kasey Cisyk and Didi Conn - You Light Up My Life (1977)" on YouTube

Flip side
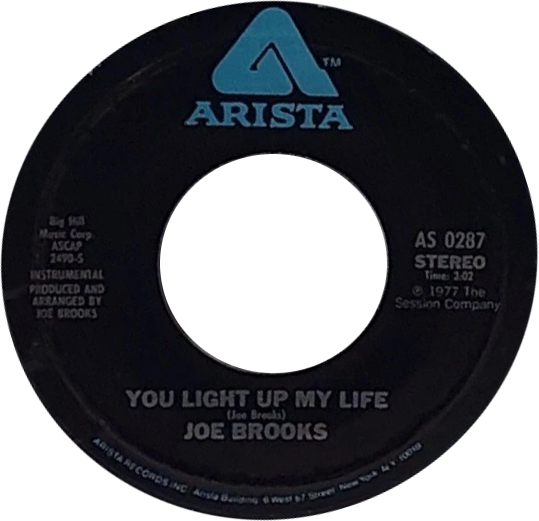
- Instrumental side of the US single

"You Light Up My Life" is a ballad written by Joseph Brooks, and originally recorded by Kasey Cisyk for the soundtrack album to the 1977 film of the same title. The song was lip synced in the film by its lead actress, Didi Conn. The cover version of the song by Debby Boone, the daughter of singer Pat Boone, was number one on the Billboard Hot 100 chart for ten consecutive weeks in 1977 and topped Record World magazine's Top 100 Singles Chart for a record 13 weeks.

== Original film version ==
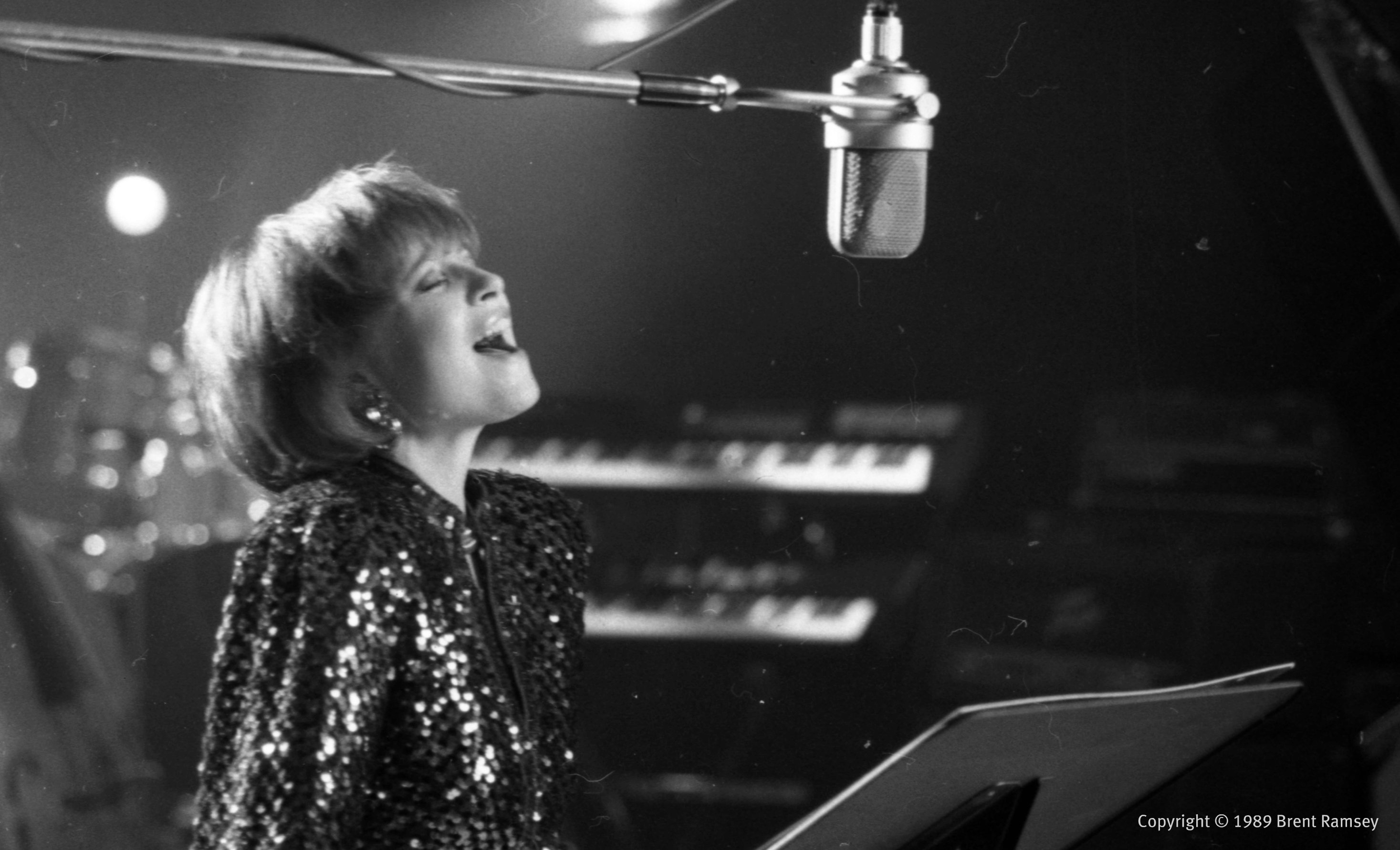
Kasey Cisyk, 1989

Cisyk's original soundtrack recording was included in the film's soundtrack album. It was then later released as a single to bolster sales of the soundtrack album after Debby Boone included her version on her first solo album (also titled You Light Up My Life). The soundtrack album was certified Gold, peaking at No. 17 on the Billboard 200 albums chart.

Cisyk's single was credited to "Original Cast", not to Cisyk herself, and Brooks is listed on the A-side of the single. The single charted on the Billboard Hot 100 and reached No. 80. Brooks also released an instrumental version of the song from the soundtrack as a promotional single, but that version failed to chart.

Following the success of Boone's version, the song earned Brooks a Grammy Award for Song of the Year, an Academy Award for Best Original Song, a Golden Globe Award for Best Original Song and an American Society of Composers, Authors and Publishers (ASCAP) award.

=== Track listing ===
7" vinyl single

1. "You Light Up My Life" (Instrumental) — 3:02
2. "You Light Up My Life" (Original Cast) — 3:29

=== Chart performance (Original Cast single) ===
| Chart (1977) | Peak position |
|---|---|
| US Billboard Hot 100 | 80 |

=== The Joseph Brooks controversies ===
In a 2013 biographical essay about Cisyk, Cisyk's second husband, Ed Rakowicz (who worked as a sound engineer, but not for this song), wrote that songwriter Brooks was initially pleased with Cisyk's recording of the song with orchestra (and her version appeared in the movie and soundtrack) but "tried to evade payment by false promises and by asking her to be an incidental actor in his film, implying huge rewards yet to come..." Rackowicz claimed that Brooks made improper advances toward Cisyk, that after being rebuffed, he refused to speak directly to her again, and that he continued to evade payments to her while commissioning another recording with Debby Boone.

According to Rackowicz, "Besides wanting Boone to copy Kacey's [sic] iconic hit reading of his songs, Brooks needed to cover up Kacey's vocal leakage in the microphones in the piano recorded at the original demo session on which was overdubbed the orchestral track used in the film. Brooks didn't want to pay to re-record the piano and orchestra again." In 2003, Boone admitted, "I had no freedom whatsoever. Joe told me exactly how to sing it and imitate every inflection from the original recording." in an interview with Entertainment Weekly Magazine. Cisyk later retained a lawyer and sued Brooks for the fees she had earned for her work on the record and for credit on the soundtrack, which she later received.

== Debby Boone version ==
"You Light Up My Life"
- Side A of the US single

Single by Debby Boone

from the album You Light Up My Life
- B-side: "Hasta Mañana" (US & selected territories); "He's a Rebel" (performed by the Boones; selected countries)
- Released: August 16, 1977
- Recorded: April 1977
- Genre: Soft rock
- Length: 3:35
- Label: Warner Bros.-Curb
- Songwriter: Joe Brooks
- Producer: Joe Brooks

Debby Boone singles chronology
| "You Light Up My Life" (1977) | "California" (1978) |

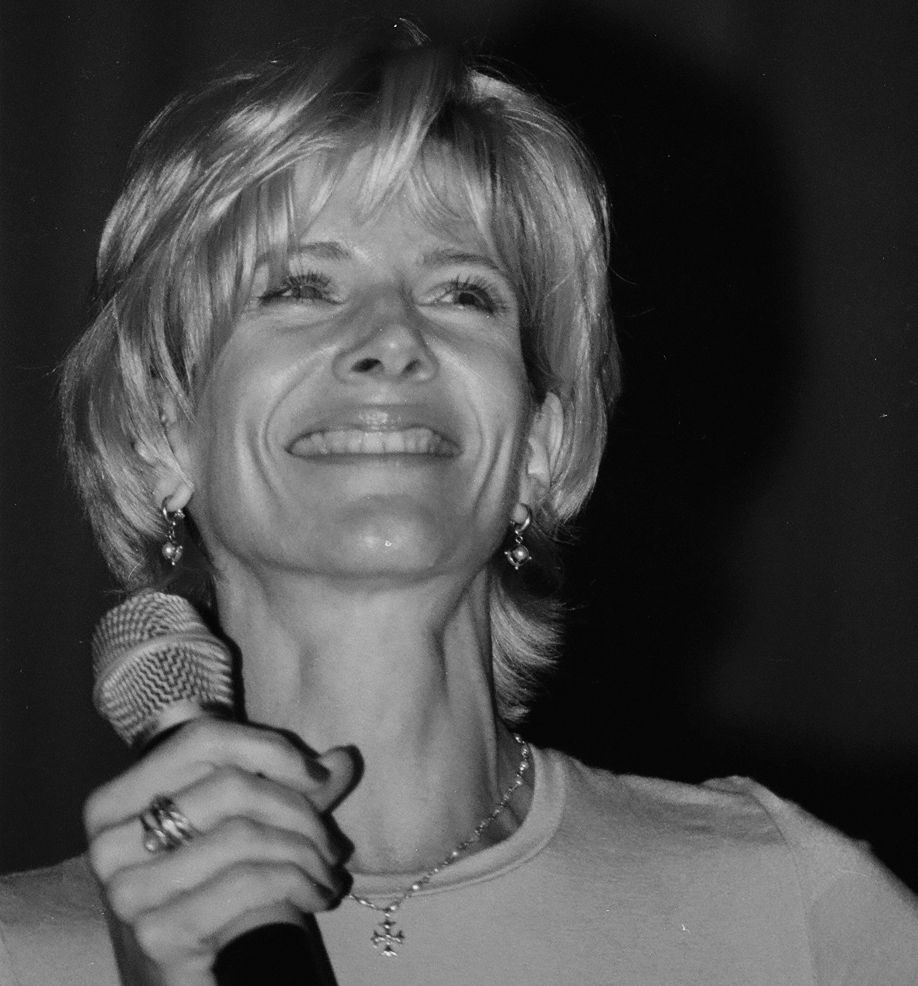
Debby Boone, 1997

In 1977, Debby Boone, Pat Boone's daughter, recorded the song under the guidance of Curb Records executive Mike Curb and songwriter Joseph Brooks. Boone recorded her vocals over a pre-existing instrumental track that Brooks already had developed for the film's soundtrack. The song was released as both a Warner-Curb Records single and as the title track to her first solo album, You Light Up My Life, which she released on Warner Bros. Records, Curb Records' parent label.

Cash Box said that "Ms. Boone builds it to a powerful emotional peak as a massive string section lends support."

The single became the biggest single of the 1970s in the United States, setting a new Billboard Hot 100 record for most weeks spent at number one. Elvis Presley's double-sided hit "Don't Be Cruel/Hound Dog", then recognized as the longest-running number one song of the rock era, spent eleven weeks atop the Billboard Best Sellers chart in 1956, before the 1958 debut of the Hot 100. The previous Hot 100 record was held by Bobby Darin's "Mack the Knife", Percy Faith's recording of "Theme from A Summer Place" (1960) and the Beatles' "Hey Jude" (1968), all three of which remained at No. 1 for nine weeks. The ten-week record was matched in 1982 by Olivia Newton-John's "Physical", but was not surpassed until a 1991 change in chart methodology allowed songs to achieve longer reigns at No. 1. In 1992, "End of the Road" by Boyz II Men would set the new record with 13 weeks.

Besting her chart performance in Billboard, Boone's "You Light Up My Life" single topped Record World's Top 100 Singles Chart for an unbroken record of 13 weeks. On Billboard's chart, Boone was unseated from No. 1 by the Bee Gees, with "How Deep Is Your Love", the first of three No. 1 singles from the Saturday Night Fever soundtrack. On Record World's chart, Boone kept the Bee Gees out of the number-one spot. In Cash Box magazine, "You Light Up My Life" managed only an eight-week stay at the top of the chart, before being dethroned by Crystal Gayle's "Don't It Make My Brown Eyes Blue". Its least-lengthy run was on the Radio and Records chart, with six weeks at No. 1 before relinquishing the spot to the Bee Gees; it had knocked Carly Simon's "Nobody Does It Better" out of the top spot after only one week.

The single, which was certified platinum by the Recording Industry Association of America (RIAA), also hit No. 1 on the Adult Contemporary chart and reached No. 4 on the Country chart. The single peaked at No. 48 on the UK Singles Chart. Boone's hit single led to her winning the 1978 Grammy Award for Best New Artist, with additional Grammy nominations for Best Pop Vocal Performance, Female and Record of the Year. Boone also won the 1977 American Music Award for Favorite Pop Single.

In 2008, it was ranked at No. 7 on Billboard's "Hot 100 All-Time Top Songs" list (August 1958 - July 2008). An updated version of the all-time list in 2013 ranked the song at No. 9.

=== Track listing ===
- 7" vinyl single
1. "You Light Up My Life"* – 3:35
2. "Hasta Mañana"** – 3:12

* Note: Produced and arranged by Joe Brooks.
** Note: Produced by Mike Curb and arranged by Al Capps.

=== Chart performance (Debby Boone single) ===
==== Weekly charts ====
| Chart (1977–1978) | Peak position |
|---|---|
| Australian Kent Music Report | 7 |
| Canada Top Singles (RPM) | 1 |
| Canada Adult Contemporary (RPM) | 1 |
| Canada Country Singles (RPM) | 6 |
| New Zealand (Recorded Music NZ) | 12 |
| South African Singles Chart | 3 |
| UK Singles (OCC) | 48 |
| US Billboard Hot 100 | 1 |
| US Adult Contemporary (Billboard) | 1 |
| US Hot Country Songs (Billboard) | 4 |
| US Record World Singles Chart | 1 |
| US Cashbox Top 100 Singles | 1 |

==== Year-end charts ====
| Chart (1977) | Rank |
|---|---|
| Australia (Kent Music Report) | 30 |
| Brazil | 3 |
| Canada | 1 |
| US Billboard Hot 100 | 51 |
| US Cashbox Magazine | 1 |
| US Record World | 1 |

| Chart (1978) | Rank |
|---|---|
| South Africa | 10 |
| US Billboard Hot 100 | 3 |
| US Billboard Easy Listening | 46 |

==== All-time charts ====
| Chart (1958–2018) | Position |
|---|---|
| US Billboard Hot 100 | 11 |

== LeAnn Rimes version ==
"You Light Up My Life"

Single by LeAnn Rimes

from the album You Light Up My Life: Inspirational Songs
- B-side: "I Believe"
- Released: August 26, 1997
- Genre: Country
- Length: 3:37
- Label: Curb
- Songwriter: Joe Brooks
- Producers: Mike Curb; Chuck Howard; Wilbur C. Rimes

LeAnn Rimes singles chronology
| "How Do I Live" (1997) | "You Light Up My Life" (1997) | "On the Side of Angels" (1998) |

Music video
- "You Light Up My Life" by LeAnn Rimes on YouTube

LeAnn Rimes released a version of "You Light Up My Life" as a single in 1997, 20 years after Boone's version was released, and on the same record label, the Warner Bros. Records label's Curb Records label. Her version fared modestly by comparison to the original at radio (No. 48 Country). However, her single was certified gold and was the title track to her No. 1 pop and country album, You Light Up My Life: Inspirational Songs.

=== Track listing ===
- US CD single
1. "You Light Up My Life"* – 3:37
2. "I Believe"** – 2:22

* Note: Produced by Wilbur C. Rimes, Chuck Howard and Mike Curb.
** Note: Produced by Wilbur C. Rimes.

=== Chart performance (LeAnn Rimes single) ===
| Chart (1997–1998) | Peak position |
|---|---|
| Canada Country Singles (RPM) | 57 |
| US Billboard Hot 100 | 34 |
| US Hot Country Songs (Billboard) | 48 |
| US Adult Contemporary (Billboard) | 35 |
| US Rhythmic Airplay (Billboard) | 71 |
| US Top Country Singles Sales (Billboard) | 2 |

=== Certifications ===
| Region | Certification | Certified units/sales |
|---|---|---|
| United States (RIAA) | Gold | 500,000^{^} |
^{^} Shipments figures based on certification alone.

== Other versions ==
Many artists have covered "You Light Up My Life" since 1977.

- Perry Como performed it on Bob Hope's TV special in 1977 (then recorded for CD in 2000).
- Johnny Mathis recorded the song and named his 1978 album after the song.
- Engelbert Humperdinck also recorded "You Light Up My Life" in 1978, including it on his album "Last of the Romantics".
- Valeria Lynch recorded the song covered "Tú me haces feliz" for her 1979 album Yo soy tu canción....
- Japanese singer Yuki Saito recorded it (in English) for her 1994 album Moi.
- Whitney Houston recorded the song for her 2002 album Just Whitney....
- The Irish] pop band Westlife recorded a cover of the song on their The Love Album album in 2006.
- A French rendering entitled "Tu remplis ma vie" was recorded by Anne Renée in 1977.
- America's Got Talent season 1 winner Bianca Ryan covered the song for her 2006 debut album.
- Patti Smith performed the song on the ABC television program Kids Are People Too, accompanied by Brooks on piano.
- Mexican pop singer, Yuri recorded the song cover “Tú iluminas mi vida” for her first album released in 1978.
- Filipina singer, Angeline Quinto recorded the song for her second album Fall in Love Again released in 2012.
- The song has also been recorded by Aretha Franklin, Loleatta Holloway, Jean Carn, Kenny Rogers, Angeline Quinto, José Carreras, Robert Goulet, Carole King, and Samantha Cole.

== See also ==
- List of RPM number-one singles of 1977
- List of Hot 100 number-one singles of 1977 (U.S.)
- List of number-one adult contemporary singles of 1977 (U.S.)
- List of Billboard Hot 100 chart achievements and milestones
- List of 1970s one-hit wonders in the United States
