= List of Hot Adult Contemporary number ones of 1993 =

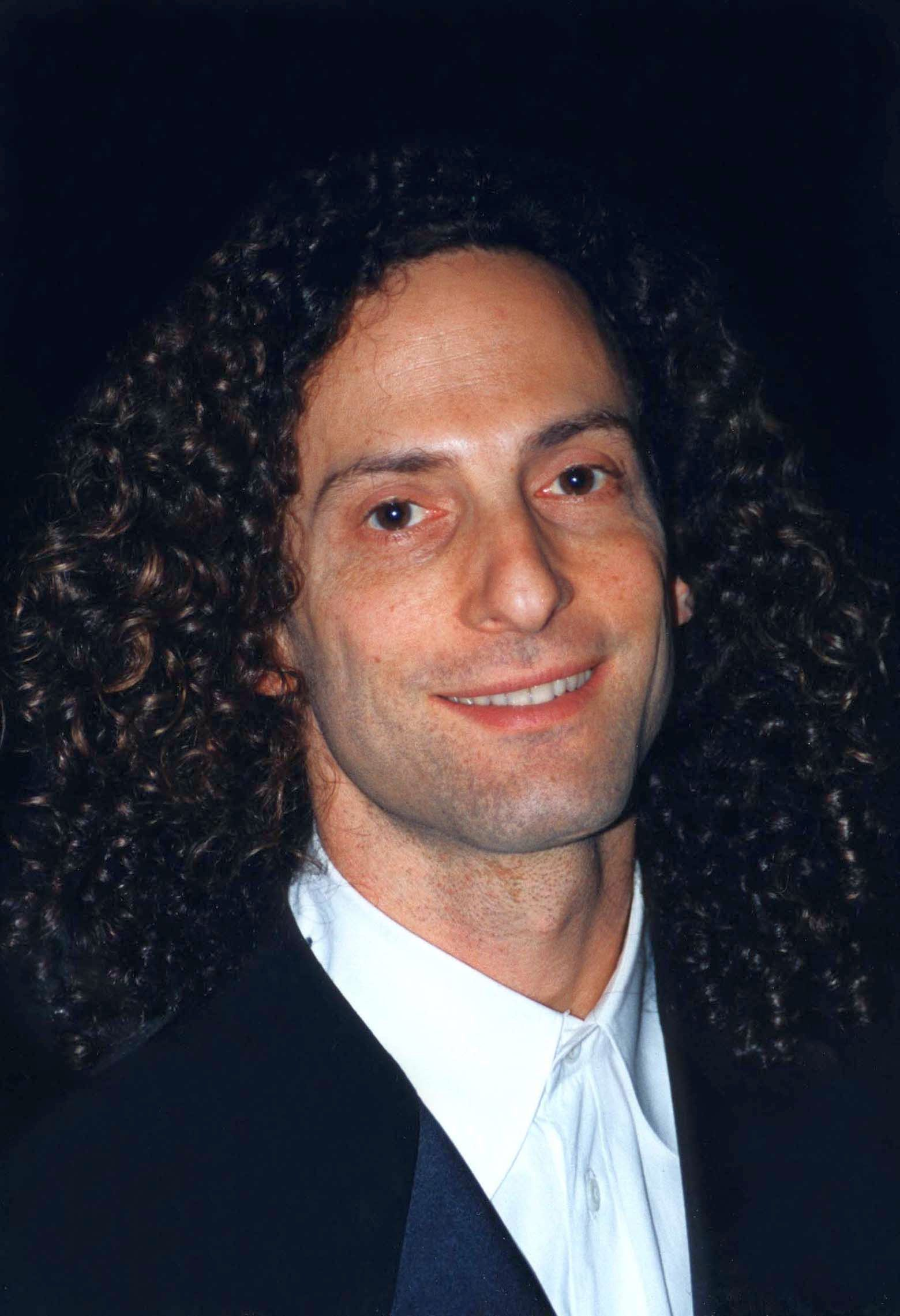
The saxophonist Kenny G had two number ones in 1993.

In 1993, Billboard magazine published a chart ranking the top-performing songs in the United States in the adult contemporary music (AC) market. The chart, which in 1993 was published under the title Hot Adult Contemporary, has undergone various name changes during its history but has been published as Adult Contemporary since 1996. In 1993, 13 songs topped the chart, which was compiled based on playlists submitted by radio stations through the issue of Billboard dated July 10. With effect from the following week, a new methodology was introduced which used airplay data compiled by Nielsen Broadcast Data Systems, which provided a more accurate reflection of the numbers of plays that songs were actually receiving.

At the start of the year, Whitney Houston was at number one with "I Will Always Love You", from the soundtrack of the film The Bodyguard, in which she starred. In the issue of Billboard dated January 23, the track was displaced from the top spot by another song from a film soundtrack, as "A Whole New World (Aladdin's Theme)" by Peabo Bryson featuring Regina Belle, from the animated film Aladdin, reached number one. Both songs also topped the magazine's pop singles chart, the Hot 100. Houston returned to the top of the chart with another song from The Bodyguard in May, spending two weeks at number one with "I Have Nothing". In addition to Houston, two other artists had two number ones in 1993. The jazz saxophonist Kenny G spent two weeks at number one with "Forever in Love" and a similar length of time in the top spot with "By the Time This Night Is Over". The latter track featured Bryson on vocals, making him another two-time chart-topper.

Following the change in the chart's methodology, songs began to have longer runs at number one, beginning with "I Don't Wanna Fight" by Tina Turner, which spent seven consecutive weeks atop the chart beginning in the second issue after the change. In the issue of Billboard dated September 11, Billy Joel replaced Turner at number one with his song "The River of Dreams", which went on to spend 12 consecutive weeks at number one, breaking the record for the longest run atop the AC chart, which had been held by Paul Mauriat's "Love is Blue" since 1968. Joel's song was replaced at number one by Michael Bolton's "Said I Loved You... But I Lied", which spent the final four weeks of the year in the top spot. It would remain atop the chart for a further eight weeks in 1994, immediately tying the record set by Joel's song, which had preceded it at number one.

== Chart history ==
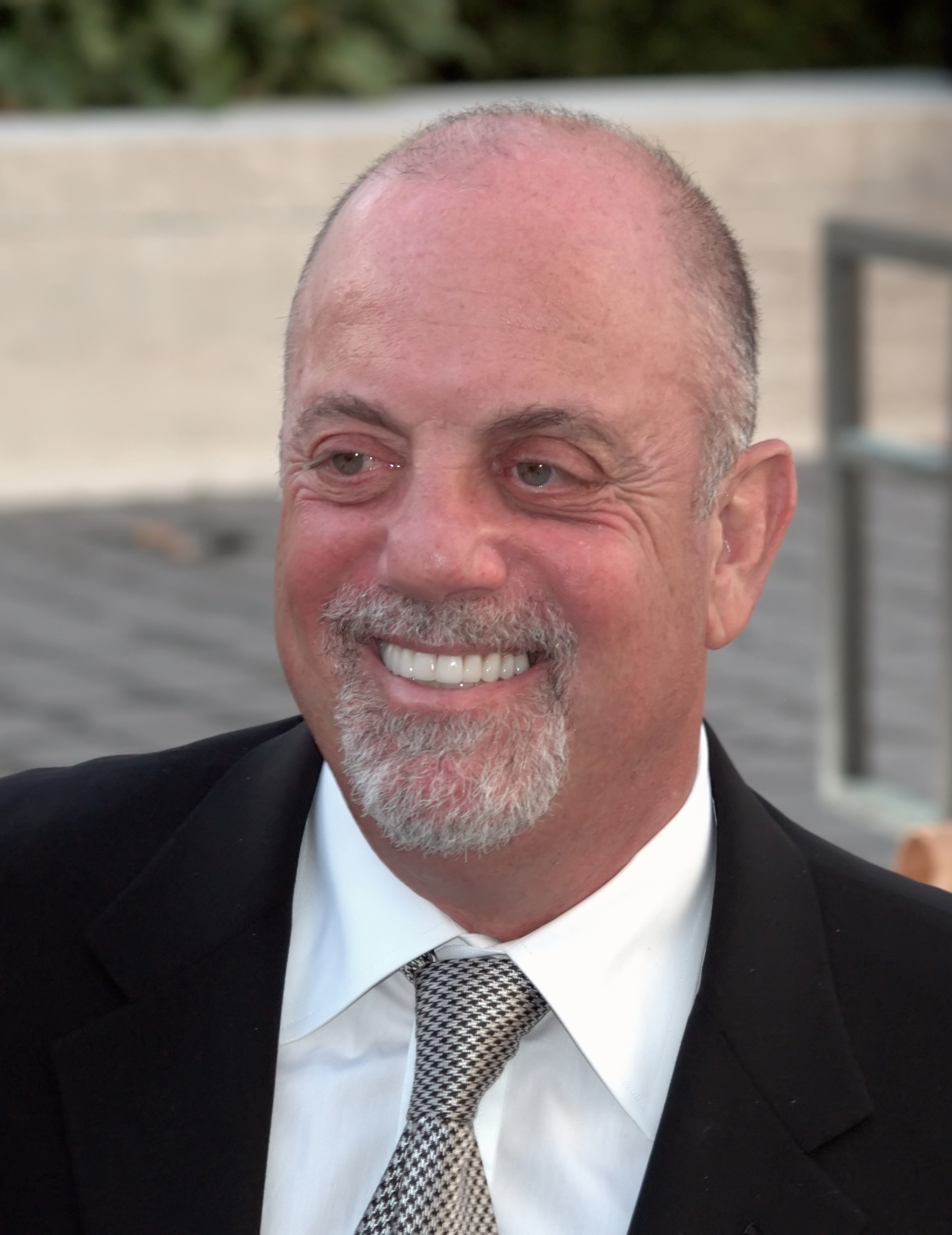
Billy Joel's song "The River of Dreams" spent 12 weeks at number one, breaking the record for the longest stay atop the chart, which had stood for 25 years.

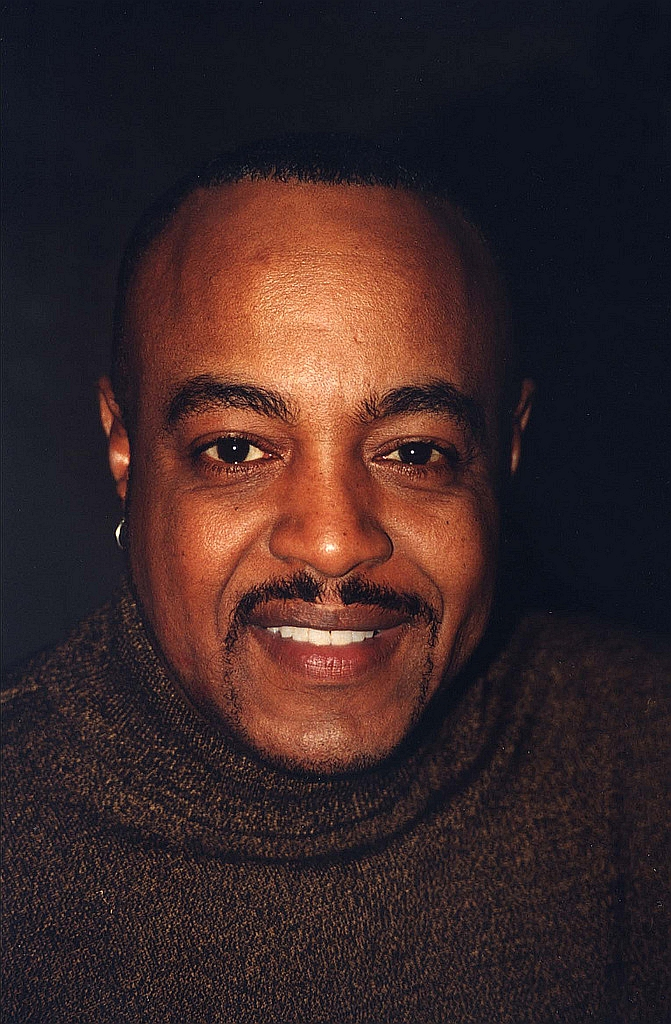
Peabo Bryson topped the chart with "A Whole New World", a duet with Regina Belle, and also provided vocals for Kenny G's chart-topper "By the Time This Night Is Over".

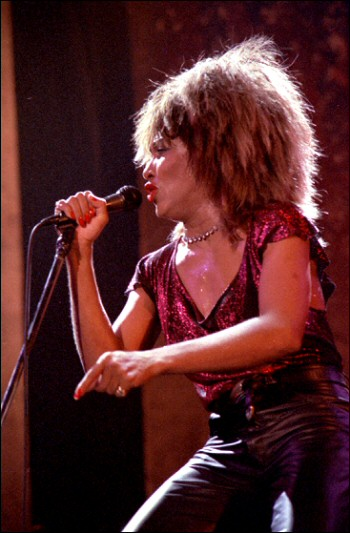
Tina Turner spent seven weeks at number one with "I Don't Wanna Fight".

Chart history
Issue date	Title	Artist(s)	Ref.
January 2	"I Will Always Love You"	Whitney Houston	
January 9	"I Will Always Love You"	Whitney Houston	
January 16	"I Will Always Love You"	Whitney Houston	
January 23	"A Whole New World (Aladdin's Theme)"	Peabo Bryson featuring Regina Belle	
January 30	"A Whole New World (Aladdin's Theme)"	Peabo Bryson featuring Regina Belle	
February 6	"A Whole New World (Aladdin's Theme)"	Peabo Bryson featuring Regina Belle	
February 13	"A Whole New World (Aladdin's Theme)"	Peabo Bryson featuring Regina Belle	
February 20	"A Whole New World (Aladdin's Theme)"	Peabo Bryson featuring Regina Belle	
February 27	"A Whole New World (Aladdin's Theme)"	Peabo Bryson featuring Regina Belle	
March 6	"Forever in Love"	Kenny G	
March 13	"Forever in Love"	Kenny G	
March 20	"Simple Life"	Elton John	
March 27	"Simple Life"	Elton John	
April 3	"Simple Life"	Elton John	
April 10	"Love Is"	Vanessa Williams featuring Brian McKnight	
April 17	"Love Is"	Vanessa Williams featuring Brian McKnight	
April 24	"Love Is"	Vanessa Williams featuring Brian McKnight	
May 1	"I Have Nothing"	Whitney Houston	
May 8	"I Have Nothing"	Whitney Houston	
May 15	"Tell Me What You Dream"	Restless Heart featuring Warren Hill	
May 22	"Tell Me What You Dream"	Restless Heart featuring Warren Hill	
May 29	"Have I Told You Lately"	Rod Stewart	
June 5	"Have I Told You Lately"	Rod Stewart	
June 12	"Have I Told You Lately"	Rod Stewart	
June 19	"Have I Told You Lately"	Rod Stewart	
June 26	"Have I Told You Lately"	Rod Stewart	
July 3	"By the Time This Night Is Over"	Kenny G featuring Peabo Bryson	
July 10	"By the Time This Night Is Over"	Kenny G featuring Peabo Bryson	
July 17	"I'll Never Get Over You (Getting Over Me)"	Exposé	
July 24	"I Don't Wanna Fight"	Tina Turner	
July 31	"I Don't Wanna Fight"	Tina Turner	
August 7	"I Don't Wanna Fight"	Tina Turner	
August 14	"I Don't Wanna Fight"	Tina Turner	
August 21	"I Don't Wanna Fight"	Tina Turner	
August 28	"I Don't Wanna Fight"	Tina Turner	
September 4	"I Don't Wanna Fight"	Tina Turner	
September 11	"The River of Dreams"	Billy Joel	
September 18	"The River of Dreams"	Billy Joel	
September 25	"The River of Dreams"	Billy Joel	
October 2	"The River of Dreams"	Billy Joel	
October 9	"The River of Dreams"	Billy Joel	
October 16	"The River of Dreams"	Billy Joel	
October 23	"The River of Dreams"	Billy Joel	
October 30	"The River of Dreams"	Billy Joel	
November 6	"The River of Dreams"	Billy Joel	
November 13	"The River of Dreams"	Billy Joel	
November 20	"The River of Dreams"	Billy Joel	
November 27	"The River of Dreams"	Billy Joel	
December 4	"Said I Loved You... But I Lied"	Michael Bolton	
December 11	"Said I Loved You... But I Lied"	Michael Bolton	
December 18	"Said I Loved You... But I Lied"	Michael Bolton	
December 25	"Said I Loved You... But I Lied"	Michael Bolton	

== See also ==
- 1993 in music
- List of artists who reached number one on the U.S. Adult Contemporary chart
