= Bernard Belle =

American composer, producer, and musician (1963–2022)

- Born: November 12, 1964
- Origin: Englewood, New Jersey, U.S.
- Died: June 23, 2022 (aged 57)
- Genres: New jack swing, R&B, gospel
- Occupations: Record producer; songwriter; musician; performer
- Instruments: Bass guitar, vocals, piano
- Years active: 1984–2022

Bernard Belle (November 12, 1964 – June 23, 2022) was an American composer, producer, and musician. After starting his career as an R&B guitarist, Belle became known as a songwriter for Michael Jackson and Whitney Houston and a producer of gospel music.

== Career ==
Belle grew up in Englewood, New Jersey, and performed as a musician while still a student at Dwight Morrow High School.

Belle received his first break in the late 1980s. His sister, Regina Belle, a Grammy Award-winning singer who was providing background vocals for R&B group The Manhattans at the time, recommended him to play guitar for the group.

Bernard Belle is notable for his partnership with producer Teddy Riley and his collaborations with Michael Jackson. He is credited with writing and co-writing "Remember the Time", "Privacy" and "Why You Wanna Trip on Me".

He began working with Teddy Riley in 1986. Together, they became the pioneers of the new jack swing era of music. He wrote and produced for, among others, Whitney Houston, Bobby Brown, Patti LaBelle, Aaron Hall, Keith Sweat, Al B. Sure!, and Today.

After dedicating his life to Christ in 1994, Belle started producing in the gospel music industry. He performed with Donnie McClurkin, Shirley Caesar, Richard Smallwood, Marvin Sapp, Fred Hammond, Yolanda Adams, Tye Tribbett, Mary Mary, Kirk Franklin, Donald Lawrence, Smokie Norful, Hezekiah Walker and BeBe & CeCe Winans.

He was a recurring musician on the BET gospel shows Sunday Best and The Celebration of Gospel.

Belle's name appears on over 70 million records worldwide as a producer, writer, or musician. He received four Grammy Awards, an American Music Award, two Soul Train Music Awards, over a dozen ASCAP Awards, and nominations for Stella and GMA Dove Awards.

== Personal life ==
Belle married Debra Belle in November 1995. Belle had five children.

A longtime resident of Teaneck, New Jersey, Belle died on June 23, 2022, at the age of 57 of congestive heart failure.

== Discography ==
Year	Song Title	Album/CD	Artist(s)	Credited as
1989	"You Found Another Guy"	High Hat	Boy George	Composer
1989		Stay with Me	Regina Belle	Producer
1989	"Your Love Is Not True", "Sexy Lady"	Today	Today	Producer
1990	"Let's Chill, Long Gone"	The Future	Guy	Backing vocalist, producer, composer
1990	"I Just Can't Handle It", "I Like the Way (The Kissing Game)"	Hi-Five	Hi-Five	Composer, backing vocalist
1990	"It's Time", "A Friend"	Return	The Winans	Producer, composer
1991	"Let Me Know", "Tennis Anyone", "No Need to Worry", "My Happiness"	New Formula	Today	Backing vocalist, producer
1991		Voyce Boxing	Voyce Boxing	Remixing
1991	"Remember the Time", "Why You Wanna Trip on Me"	Dangerous	Michael Jackson	Composer
1992	"Get Away", "Two Can Play That Game", "One More Night", "Something in Common"	Bobby	Bobby Brown	Composer, backing vocalist
1994	"In You"	Here I Am	Glenn Jones	Composer, multi-instrumentalist, producer
1997		Baby Come To Me: The Best of Regina Belle	Regina Belle	Arranger
1997	"If By Chance"	Flame	Patti LaBelle	Composer
1998	"I Gotch U"	Believe in Me	Regina Belle	Keyboards, programming, producer, mixing, composer
1999	"Nobody Like You"	I Claim the Victory	Doc Powell	Composer
2001	"Johnny's Back"	This Is Regina!	Regina Belle	Producer, instrumentation, composer
2001	"Privacy"	Invincible	Michael Jackson	Composer
2005	"The Chosen One"	Ghetto Classics	Jaheim	Arranger, producer
2006		We Praise You	The McClurkin Project	Bass programming, guitar overdubs
2008	"Launch Out"	Launch Out Project	Rev. Stefanie R. Minatee	Bass, engineer, musician
2008	"God Is Good, Good To Be Loved"	Love Forever Shines	Regina Belle	Arranger, programming, producer, musician, composer
