= Love Forever Shines =

Studio album by Regina Belle
- Released: May 13, 2008
- Studio: Canvas Studios (Houston, Texas); Dark Horse Recording Studio (Franklin, Tennessee); Jr.'s Studio (Bridgeport, Connecticut)
- Genre: Gospel; R&B
- Length: 72:47
- Label: Pendulum
- Producer: Bernard Belle; Gary Mayes; Shawn McLemore; Chris Walker

Regina Belle chronology
Lazy Afternoon (2006)	Love Forever Shines (2008)	Higher (2012)

Love Forever Shines is the eighth studio album by American singer Regina Belle. It was released by Pendulum Records on May 13, 2008, in the United States. The album became Belle's highest-charting album since Reachin' Back (1995), peaking at number three on the US Top Gospel Albums and number 15 on the Top R&B/Hip-Hop Albums. The album's first single "God Is Good" peaked at number 34 on the Hot R&B/Hip-Hop Songs.

== Critical reception ==
Professional ratings
Review scores
Source	Rating
AllMusic	4/5 stars

AllMusic editor Tammy La Gorce found that Love Forever Shines "proves it's never too late to return to the sound that gave you liftoff [...] Belle busts out a spiritual certainty that benefits from maturity. She's an artist who's been there, seen that, and she's saved some of her boldest, most bewitching moments [...] for this record. Jazz, hip-hop, R&B and soul make appearances, but at the end of a long set of praising, cherishing and reaching for the vocal rafters this is a pure contemporary gospel project. Fans of the genre will wish she had abandoned her days of Peabo Bryson and Johnny Mathis duets for a walk down this path decades ago."

== Track listing ==
No.	Title	Writer(s)	Producer(s)	Length
1.	"Love Forever Shines"	Chris Walker; Ray Davis	Walker	4:44
2.	"Can't Nobody"	Shawn McLemore	McLemore	4:12
3.	"Who Touched Me"	Michael McKay	Walker	4:37
4.	"God Is Good"	Bernard Belle	B. Belle	7:52
5.	"Almost Slipped"	Walker; Belle	Walker	5:35
6.	"I Hope He Understands"	Davis	Walker	4:34
7.	"Victory"	Mark Taylor; Regina Belle	Walker	5:26
8.	"God Said"	Walker; Davis	Walker	3:46
9.	"Good to Be Loved"	B. Belle; R. Belle	B. Belle	5:07
10.	"Come Into This Place"	James Brooks; R. Belle	Walker	6:24
11.	"Coming Out of This"	Gary Mayes; R. Belle	Mayes	4:26
12.	"I Call On Jesus"	Walker	Walker	6:21
13.	"My Destiny"	Walker; Davis; R. Belle	Mayes	3:32
14.	"I'll Never Leave You Alone"	R. Belle	Walker	6:11

== Personnel ==
Musicians and vocalists

- Regina Belle – lead vocals, backing vocals (1, 5, 7, 11–13)
- Chris Walker – all instruments (1, 8, 13), programming (1, 8, 13), backing vocals (1, 3, 5, 7, 10–13)
- Mark Taylor – keyboards (2, 3, 5, 7, 10, 12), organ (2, 3), backing vocals (3, 10)
- Bernard Belle – all instruments (9), programming (9)
- Gary Mayes – all instruments (11), programming (11)
- Glenn Piper – keyboards (14)
- Darrell Crooks – guitars (1, 12)
- Charles Walker Jr. – guitars (2)
- Rick Marcel – guitars (3)
- Randy Bowland – guitars (5, 7)
- Scott Denté – guitars (6)
- Jonathan DuBose – guitars (9, 10)
- Chris Black – bass (2, 3, 5, 7, 10, 12)
- Ernest Walker – drums (2, 3, 5, 7, 10, 12)
- Philip Lassiter – trumpet (11)
- The Nashville String Machine – strings (3, 6, 12)
- Earl Duncan – backing vocals (2)
- Eulanda Kinabru – backing vocals (2)
- Rhonda McLemore – backing vocals (2)
- Channel Straus – backing vocals (2)
- Nikki Sweat – backing vocals (2)
- Shawn McLemore – vocal ad libs (2)
- Angela Coher – backing vocals (3)
- Tekai Hicks – backing vocals (3, 5, 7)
- Victoria Purcell – backing vocals (3)
- Werner Richmond – backing vocals (3)
- Erin Stevenson – backing vocals (3)
- Bridgette Taylor – backing vocals (3, 5, 7, 8)
- Liz Vaughn – backing vocals (3), additional vocals (8)
- Alvin Darling – backing ad libs (4)
- Tiffany Riddick – backing ad libs (4), backing vocals (9)
- Melvin Williams – backing ad libs (4)
- Nichelle Brown – rap (8)
- Rosalyn Brunswick McDuffie – backing vocals (10)
- Nakita Clegg-Fox – backing vocals (10)
- Leona Daniels – backing vocals (10)
- Tanner Gary – backing vocals (10)
- Shirley Murdock – backing vocals (12, 13)

Music arrangements

- Chris Walker – arrangements (1, 5–8, 10, 12–14)
- Shawn McLemore – arrangements (2)
- Larry Baird – string arrangements (3, 6, 12)
- Mark Taylor – arrangements (3, 7, 10)
- Bernard Belle – arrangements (4, 9)
- Regina Belle – arrangements (7, 10, 11, 13, 14)
- James Brooks – arrangements (10)
- Philip Lassiter – horn arrangements (11)
- Gary Mayes – arrangements (11)
- Glenn Piper – arrangements (14)

== Production ==
- Ray J. Davis – executive producer
- Ruben Rodriguez – executive producer
- Chris Walker – executive producer, mixing
- Haniel Trisha – engineer, mixing
- Jonathan DuBose – guitar recording (9, 10)
- Michael Modesto – additional engineer
- Leon Zervos – mastering at Sterling Sound (New York City, New York)
- Ivy Taylor – album coordinator
- Xavier Rodriguez – graphic design
- Drexina Nelson – photography
- Safira Sanders – photography assistant

== Charts ==
Chart (2008)	Peak position
US Billboard 200	119
US Independent Albums (Billboard)	14
US Top Gospel Albums (Billboard)	3
US Top R&B/Hip-Hop Albums (Billboard)	15
