= Positive (Peabo Bryson album) =

Studio album by Peabo Bryson
- Released: January 1988
- Studios: Cheshire (Atlanta, Georgia); Ambience Recorders (Farmington Hills, Michigan); Yamaha R & D (Glendale, California); Producers 1 & 2 (Los Angeles, California); Electric Lady (New York City, New York)
- Genres: Soul, R&B
- Length: 45:01
- Label: Elektra
- Producers: Peabo Bryson; Sir Gant; Michael J. Powell; Dwight W. Watkins

Peabo Bryson chronology
Quiet Storm (1986)	Positive (1988)	All My Love (1989)

Positive is a studio album by the American singer Peabo Bryson, released in January 1988 by Elektra Records. The album peaked at number 157 on the US Billboard 200 and number 42 on the Billboard R&B albums chart. It was the last album Bryson recorded for Elektra before he briefly returned to Capitol Records. Positive was supported by the single "Without You", which was also the theme song to Leonard Part 6.

== Critical reception ==
Professional ratings
Review scores
Source	Rating
AllMusic	2/5 stars

The Kingston Whig-Standard wrote that Bryson's "voice flutters and soars, delicate one moment, powerful the next, duelling with the different instruments." The Washington Post deemed Bryson "a smoothly persuasive soul man, not too pleading, not too aggressive."

Ron Wynn of AllMusic called Positive "largely undistinguished, although [Bryson] sang with more conviction and got better material and production than on most of his other Elektra albums. He scored another hit with a familiar weapon: the duet. This time his partner was Regina Belle."

== Track listing ==
No.	Title	Writer(s)	Producer(s)	Length
1.	"Come on Over Tonight"	Jimmy Scott	Michael J. Powell; Sir Gant	3:47
2.	"Without You (Love Theme from Leonard Part 6)" (duet with Regina Belle)	Lamont Dozier	Powell; Sir Gant	5:15
3.	"Hurt"	Jimmie Crane; Al Jacobs	Powell; Sir Gant	3:34
4.	"I Want to Know"	Peabo Bryson	Bryson; Dwight W. Watkins	4:28
5.	"Tonight"	Bryson	Bryson; Watkins	4:41
6.	"Positive"	Allister Campbell; Peter Quigley	Powell; Sir Gant	5:02
7.	"When We Need It Bad"	Patrick Henderson; Pamela Phillips Oland; Tsuyoshi Takayanagi	Powell; Sir Gant	4:58
8.	"This Time Around"	Bryson	Bryson; Watkins	4:29
9.	"Still Water"	Bryson	Bryson; Watkins	4:35
10.	"Crazy Love" (CD-only track)	Garry Glenn; Dianne Quander	Powell; Sir Gant	4:12

== Personnel and credits ==
Musicians

- Peabo Bryson – vocals, keyboards (4, 5, 8, 9)
- Gary Barlough – Synclavier programming (1–3, 6, 7, 10)
- Sir Dean Gant – keyboards (1, 7), Synclavier (1–3, 6, 7, 10), synth bass (1, 7), acoustic piano (2), synthesizers (2–6, 10), Moog synth solo (10)
- Vernon Fails – electric piano (2)
- George Martin – keyboards (4, 5, 8, 9), computer programming (4, 5, 8, 9)
- Dwight W. Watkins – keyboards (4, 5, 8, 9), bass guitar (4, 5, 8, 9), drum computer (4, 5, 8, 9), backing vocals (4, 5, 8, 9)
- Michael J. Powell – guitars (1–3, 6, 10), acoustic guitar (7), electric guitar (7)
- Anthony Jackson – bass (2)
- Neil Stubenhaus – bass (3)
- Nathan East – bass (10)
- Vinnie Colaiuta – drums (1, 7, 10)
- Steve Ferrone – drums (2)
- Jonathan Moffett – drums (3)
- Paulinho da Costa – percussion (1, 7, 10)
- Brandon Fields – tenor sax solo (1), saxophone solo (6, 10), alto sax solo (7), soprano sax solo (7)
- Justo Almario – tenor sax solo (3)
- Keni Burke – backing vocals (1, 7, 10)
- Brenda Jones Williams – backing vocals (1, 4, 5, 7–10)
- Shirley Jones – backing vocals (1, 7, 10)
- Regina Belle – vocals (2)
- Jim Gilstrap – backing vocals (2, 6)
- Bunny Hull – backing vocals (2, 6)
- Marva King – backing vocals (2, 6)
- Cindy Mizelle – backing vocals (2)
- Valerie Pinkston – backing vocals (2, 6)
- Charles Bryson – backing vocals (4, 5, 8, 9)
- Myra Walker – backing vocals (4, 5, 8, 9)

Music arrangements

- Sir Dean Gant – arrangements (1–3, 6, 7, 10), BGV arrangements (10)
- Michael J. Powell – arrangements (1–3, 6, 10), BGV arrangements (7, 10)
- Keni Burke – BGV arrangements (1, 7)
- George Del Barrio – string arrangements (2)
- Cindy Mizelle – BGV arrangements (2)
- Peabo Bryson – arrangements (4, 5, 8, 9)
- Dwight W. Watkins – arrangements (4, 5, 8, 9)

Production

- Sir Dean Gant – producer (1–3, 6, 7, 10)
- Michael J. Powell – producer (1–3, 6, 7, 10)
- Peabo Bryson – producer (4, 5, 8, 9)
- Dwight W. Watkins – producer (4, 5, 8, 9)
- Carol Bobolts – art direction
- Gilles Larrain – photography
- Timmothy Montgomery – make-up

Technical credits

- Bernie Grundman – mastering at Bernie Grundman Mastering (Hollywood, California)
- Barney Perkins – engineer (1–3, 6, 7, 10), recording (2–6, 8, 9), mixing (2–6, 8, 9)
- Thom Kidd – recording (4, 5, 8, 9)
- Greg Townley – additional recording (1, 7, 10)
- Tom Wright – additional recording (1, 7, 10), recording (4, 5, 8, 9)
- Fred Law – additional recording (2, 3, 6)
- Keith Seppenen – additional recording (2, 3, 6)
- Milton Chan – assistant engineer (1–3, 6, 7, 10)
- Andy Harper – assistant engineer (1, 7, 10)
- Elliott Peters – assistant engineer (1–3, 6, 7, 10)
- Andrew Spiegelman – assistant engineer (2, 3, 6)
- Gerard Smerek – assistant engineer (2, 3, 6)
- Barry Leff – assistant engineer (4, 5, 8, 9)
- Steve McCormick – assistant engineer (4, 5, 8, 9)
- Lewis Padgett – assistant engineer (4, 5, 8, 9)

== Charts ==
Chart (1988)	Peak position
US Billboard 200	157
US Top R&B/Hip-Hop Albums (Billboard)	42
