= Without You (Peabo Bryson and Regina Belle song) =

Single by Peabo Bryson and Regina Belle

from the album Positive
- B-side: "The Higher You Climb"
- Released: November 1987
- Recorded: 1987
- Genre: Soul; R&B
- Length: 5:14 (Original full single); 4:30 (Single edited version)
- Label: Elektra Records
- Songwriter: Lamont Dozier
- Producers: Michael J. Powell, Sir Gant

Peabo Bryson singles chronology
"Catch 22" (1987)	"Without You" (1987)	"Show and Tell" (1989)

Regina Belle singles chronology
"So Many Tears" (1987)	"Without You" (1987)	"How Could You Do It to Me" (1988)

Music video
- "Without You" by Peabo Bryson and Regina Belle at the Soul Train on YouTube

"Without You" is a romantic song written by the American songwriter and music producer Lamont Dozier, and recorded in 1987 as a duet by the R&B singers Peabo Bryson and Regina Belle. The song was the love theme from the comedy film Leonard Part 6, released the same year, and was also recorded for the Peabo Bryson album Positive, released in 1988, the only album that contains the original version of "Without You". The single was released in November 1987, and peaked at #8 on the Adult Contemporary Tracks, #14 on the R&B chart, #85 on the UK Singles, and #89 on the Billboard Hot 100, between 1987/1988.

"Without You" was the first duet recorded by Bryson and Belle, who recorded four songs together, and was also the first successful duet of the two. Another success the duo came in 1992 with "A Whole New World", the theme of the animated feature film Aladdin.

In addition to its original English version by Bryson and Belle, "Without You" also received two adaptations in different languages. The first was in Portuguese sing by Rosanah Fiengo and the second was in Spanish, in 1989 and 1990, respectively. Both adaptations received the title "Amor Dividido", and were recorded by the same Brazilian singer. The adaptation in Portuguese was a success in Brazil in 1989.

== Music video ==
"Without You" has no official video clip, only a video with a presentation of Peabo Bryson and Regina Belle in the American musical variety television program Soul Train in 1987, presented by American television show host Don Cornelius. The video can be watched on "Without You" by Peabo Bryson and Regina Belle (Soul Train 1987) on YouTube.

== Description ==
"Without You" was composed by Lamont Dozier to be the love theme in Leonard Part 6, released in the United States on December 18, 1987, and the film starred Bill Cosby in the lead role. That same year, Regina Belle released her first album, All by Myself, but "Without You" was not included on the album. In 2012, All by Myself was remastered on CD and "Without You" was included at the end of the album as a bonus track, however, it was not the original 1987 version, but a "single mix" of the song. "Without You" was not included in any of Belle's other albums, nor in her compilations. Unlike her, Bryson included the song on his album Positive, released in 1988, the only album that contains the original version of "Without You", which was also included in his compilations Anthology, released in 2001, and Bedroom Classics Vol. 2 – Peabo Bryson, released in 2004. On every album that the song is present, it is titled "Without You (Love Theme from Leonard Part 6)", but its title is only "Without You". It was the first of four duets recorded by Peabo Bryson and Regina Belle, who recorded together "Without You" (in 1987), "I Can't Imagine" (in 1991), "A Whole New World" (in 1992) and "Total Praise" (in 2009).

== Track listing ==
Side	Song	Length	Interpreters	Writer/composer	Producers	Original album	Recording year
A-side	"Without You"	5:14	Peabo Bryson; Regina Belle	Lamont Dozier	Michael J. Powell; Sir Gant	Positive (Peabo Bryson album)	1987
B-side	"The Higher You Climb"	5:04	Peabo Bryson	Peabo Bryson	Peabo Bryson (Producer); Dwight Watkins (co-producer)	Quiet Storm (Peabo Bryson album)	1986

== Chart positions ==
=== Weekly charts ===
Chart (1987–88)	Peak position
UK Singles (Official Charts)	85
US Adult Contemporary (Billboard)	8
US R&B Chart (Billboard)	14
US R&B Singles (Cash Box)	15
US The Hot 100 (Billboard)	89

== B-side ==
The B-side of the original single contains the song "The Higher You Climb", which had been recorded by Bryson only in 1986. It was written and produced by himself, with co-production from Dwight Watkins, and released on his album Quiet Storm in the same year. It was a simple song from their album that was not released as a single.

== Personnel ==
=== Credits ===
- Writer – Lamont Dozier
- Lead Vocals – Peabo Bryson, Regina Belle
- Producer – Michael J. Powell, Sir Gant
- Arranged By (Backing Vocals) – Michael J. Powell, Sir Gant
- Arranged By (Strings) – George Del Barrio
- Arranged By (Backing Vocals) – Cindy Mizelle
- Backing Vocals – Cindy Mizelle, Jim Gilstrap, Bunny Hull, Marva King, Valerie Pinkston-Mayo
- Guitar – Michael J. Powell
- Piano Acoustic – Sir Gant
- Bass – Anthony Jackson
- Drums – Steve Ferrone
- Engineer – Barney Perkins
- Engineer (Assistant) – Andrew Spiegelman, Elliott Peters, Gerard Smerek, Milton Chan
- Synthesizer (Synclavier) – Sir Gant
- Programmed By (Synclavier) – Gary Barlough
- Recorded By – Barney Perkins
- Recorded By (Additional) – Keith Seppanen
- Mixed By – Barney Perkins

=== Companies ===
Recorded & Mixed at:

- Yamaha R&D Studio, Glendale, California

Additional recording at:

- Ambience Recorders, Farmington Hills, Michigan
- Electric Lady Studios, New York City, New York

Mastered at:

- Bernie Grundman Mastering

=== Final Notes ===
- ℗ 1987, Columbia Pictures Industries, Inc.
- 1988, Elektra Records / Asylum Records for the United States and WEA International Inc. for the world outside of the United States.
- From Elektra LP Positive, 1988 (Peabo Bryson album).
- Regina Belle appears courtesy of CBS Records (Columbia Records).

== Alternative single ==
"Without You" features an alternative version of its single. In this version, "Without You" has edited a smaller duration, with different cover and B-side. The cover of this version contains only the "Without You" (large size) and "If Ever You're in My Arms Again" (small size) titles, with a background in dark green and light green letters. In this version, "Without You" is only 4:30 long, an edited version of the single, while the original single is 5:14 in duration. The B-side of this alternative version is the song "If Ever You're in My Arms Again", a big hit for Bryson, originally recorded in 1984, and released as a single and included on his album Straight from the Heart the same year. The duration of 4:02 was also edited since the original version of the album has a duration of 4:14. The track list of this alternative single of "Without You" is as follows:

Side	Song	Length	Interpreters	Writer/composer	Producers	Original album	Recording year
A-side	"Without You"	4:30 (Edited version)	Peabo Bryson; Regina Belle	Lamont Dozier	Michael J. Powell; Sir Gant	Positive (Peabo Bryson album)	1987
B-side	"If Ever You're in My Arms Again"	4:02 (Edited version)	Peabo Bryson	Michael Masser; Tom Snow; Cynthia Weil	Michael Masser	Straight from the Heart (Peabo Bryson album)	1984

== Promotional single ==
"Without You" includes a promotional version of their single. This version has only "Without You", on both sides of the single. The A-side contains the edited version of the single, lasting 4:30, launched an alternative version. The B-side has the original full version with 5:14 duration. The cover of this version is also different, in red and black colors, the design of a phonograph needle on black over red background and the name "ELEKTRA" in big letters in white on black background. This track list is as follows:

Side	Song	Length	Interpreters	Writer/composer	Producers	Original album	Recording year
A-side	"Without You"	4:30 (Edited version)	Peabo Bryson; Regina Belle	Lamont Dozier	Michael J. Powell; Sir Gant	Positive (Peabo Bryson album)	1987
B-side	"Without You"	5:14 (Full version)	Peabo Bryson; Regina Belle	Lamont Dozier	Michael J. Powell; Sir Gant	Positive (Peabo Bryson album)	1987

== Portuguese version ==
In 1989, "Without You" won a Portuguese version in Brazil, recorded by the Brazilian singer Rosana, (today also known as Rosanah Fiengo) titled "Amor Dividido". The version was released on her album Onde o Amor Me Leva in the same year. The Portuguese lyrics were written by the Brazilian composer Cláudio Rabello. "Amor Dividido" had an official video and it was a big hit in Brazil in 1989, long run on radio and Rosana leading to many TV shows. The song credits are Lamont Dozier, version Cláudio Rabello.

== Spanish version ==
In 1990, Rosana recorded a special album with songs in English and Spanish, launched in Latin America, entitled Por Donde El Amor Me Lleva. This had another version of "Without You" by Rosana, this time in Spanish, in duet with the Spanish singer Emmanuel. The release was also titled "Amor Dividido", with letters in Spanish, written by the composer Karen Guindi, based on the lyrics in Portuguese, which had been written by the Brazilian composer Claudio Rabello in 1989. This version of "Without You" in Spanish was also included in a singer's album Emmanuel, entitled Vida, also released in 1990. The song credits are Lamont Dozier, version Cláudio Rabello, adaptation Karen Guindi.
