= All by Myself (Regina Belle album) =

Studio album by Regina Belle
- Released: June 1, 1987
- Recorded: October 1986 – March 1987
- Studio: Alpha International Studios (Philadelphia, Pennsylvania); The Sound Suite (Detroit, Michigan); Spectrum Sound Studios (St. Claire Shores, Michigan); Yamaha R & D Studio (Glendale, California)
- Genre: R&B; soul
- Length: 43:39
- Label: Columbia
- Producer: Michael J. Powell; Nick Martinelli

Regina Belle chronology
All by Myself (1987)	Stay with Me (1989)

Professional ratings
Review scores
Source	Rating
AllMusic	3/5 stars
Record Mirror	5/5 stars
The Rolling Stone Album Guide	3/5 stars

All by Myself is the debut album by American singer–songwriter Regina Belle. Released on June 1, 1987, by Columbia Records, the album features the hit singles "Show Me the Way", "So Many Tears", "How Could You Do It to Me", "Please Be Mine" and "You Got the Love".

The album peaked at number 85 on the US Billboard 200 and number 14 on the Top R&B/Hip-Hop Albums chart. In the same year the album was released, Belle recorded a duet with Peabo Bryson, "Without You", the love theme from the film Leonard Part 6. However, "Without You" was not included on the original release of the All by Myself album.

In 2012, the album was remastered on CD and "Without You" was included as a bonus track. This was not the original song but a "single mix".

== Track listings ==
All by Myself track listing
No.	Title	Writer(s)	Length
1.	"Show Me the Way"	Wardell Potts Jr., Joey Gallo, Susan Pomerantz	3:57
2.	"Take Your Love Away"	Regina Belle, Donnie Lyle, Michael J. Powell	4:58
3.	"Please Be Mine"	Regina Belle, Morris Levy, Winfred "Blue" Lovett, Frankie Lymon, Keith Marshall	4:13
4.	"After the Love Has Lost Its Shine"	Sam Dees	4:48
5.	"Intimate Relations"	Brian Potter, Frank Wildhorn	4:32
6.	"You Got the Love"	Karen Manno, Nick Martinelli	5:19
7.	"How Could You Do It to Me"	Sam Peake, Doug Grigsby	4:53
8.	"Gotta Give It Up"	Ed Roynesdal	3:54
9.	"So Many Tears"	Octavia Oestricher, Zane Mark	6:33

2012 expanded edition bonus tracks
No.	Title	Writer(s)	Length
10.	"Without You" (Duet with Peabo Bryson) (Love theme from Leonard Part 6 (Single Mix)	Lamont Dozier, Peabo Bryson, Regina Belle	4:30
11.	"Show Me the Way" (Extended Mix)		5:30
12.	"You Got the Love" (Remix)		6:15
13.	"How Could You Do It to Me" (Remix)	Douglas Grigsby, Samuel Peak	5:11
14.	"So Many Tears" (Cool Mix)		7:32
15.	"Show Me the Way" (Instrumental)		4:42

== Personnel ==
- Regina Belle – vocals, backing vocals (2, 5, 8)
- Randy Cantor – keyboards (1, 6–9), synthesizers (1, 6–9), keyboard solo (6)
- Dexter Wansel – keyboards (1, 6, 7), synthesizers (1, 6, 7)
- Vernon Fails – keyboards (2–5), arrangements (4)
- Sir Dean Gant – keyboards (2, 3)
- Valerie Pinkston – keyboards (2), backing vocals (2)
- David Spradley – keyboards (2)
- Ed Roynesdal – keyboards (8), synthesizers (8), bass (8), drums (8), arrangements (8)
- Byron Williams – keyboards (9), synthesizers (9)
- Ron Jennings – guitars (1, 6, 7, 9)
- Donald Lyle – guitars (2)
- Michael J. Powell – guitars (2–5), drum machine (2, 3), arrangements (4)
- Vincent Ponzi – guitars (8)
- Tony Santoro – guitars (9)
- Doug Grigsby – bass (1, 6–9)
- David B. Washington – bass (3–5)
- Daryl Burgee – drums (1, 7, 9), percussion (8, 9)
- John Kloka – drums (4)
- Ted Thomas Jr. – drums (4)
- Bruce Nazarian – drum machine (5)
- Jim Salamone – drums (6)
- Anthony Fortuna – drums (8)
- Pablo Batista – percussion (1, 6, 7)
- Nathan Alford Jr. – percussion (2)
- Paulinho da Costa – percussion (3, 5)
- Tamara Kornak – tambourine (4)
- Scott Mayo – alto saxophone (2)
- Don Myrick – alto saxophone (3)
- Sam Peake – saxophone (7)
- Bob Malach – saxophone (9), horn section (9)
- Cynthia Biggs – backing vocals (1, 6, 7, 9)
- Annette Hardeman – backing vocals (1, 6, 7, 9)
- Charlene Holloway – backing vocals (1, 6, 7)
- John Fluker – backing vocals (2)
- Bobette Jamirson-Harrison – backing vocals (2)
- Linda Lawri Harold – backing vocals (2)
- Esther, Gloria and Gracie Ridgeway – backing vocals (3, 5)
- Glenn Miller – backing vocals (8), arrangements (8)
- Deborah Dukes – backing vocals (9)

== Production ==
- Nick Martinelli – producer (1, 6–9)
- Michael J. Powell – producer (2–5), mixing (2–5)
- Bruce Weeden – engineer (1, 6–9)
- Al Rude – recording (2–5)
- Kal Sands – recording (2–5)
- Steve Smith – recording (2–5)
- Barney Perkins – mixing (2–5)
- Terry Connell – recording assistant (2–5)
- Elliot Peters – mix assistant (2–5)
- Vlado Meller – mastering at CBS Studios (New York, NY)
- Stacy Drummond – art direction
- Nesti Mendoza – photography
- Susan Daglish – styling
- Garry Zanvan – hair, make-up
- Narcissa – jacket (front cover photo)
- Nicole Miller – dress (back cover photo)
- Mervyn Dash for World-Wide Entertainment Complex, Inc. – management

== Charts ==
Chart performance for All by Myself
Chart (1987)	Peak position
Swedish Albums (Sverigetopplistan)	50
UK Albums (OCC)	53
US Billboard 200	85
US Top R&B/Hip-Hop Albums (Billboard)	14
