= Baby Come to Me =

Baby Come to Me may refer to:

- "Baby, Come to Me" (Patti Austin and James Ingram song)
- "Baby Come to Me" (Regina Belle song)
