= Back to Basics (The Manhattans album) =

Studio album by the Manhattans
- Released: 1986
- Studio: Future Recording Studio, Oak Brook, Illinois
- Genre: Soul, R&B
- Label: Columbia
- Producer: Leo Graham Enterprises, Bobby Womack

The Manhattans chronology
Too Hot to Stop It (1985)	Back to Basics (1986)	Sweet Talk (1989)

Back to Basics is the fifteenth studio album by American vocal group the Manhattans, released in 1986 through Columbia Records. It was the last record Gerald Alston would record with the Manhattans until he returned in 1995, and featured his duet performances with Regina Belle on the single "Where Did We Go Wrong?" and "Maybe Tomorrow", which was the B-side.

The album was produced by Leo Graham Enterprises and contained songs written and produced by Bobby Womack. "Where Did We Go Wrong?" was produced by Bobby Womack and written by Kathy Bloxson a.k.a. Sasha, who worked with Womack as his background vocalist on two albums in the early '80's. Joe McEwen and Mickey Eichner were executive producers.

== Critical response ==
Ron Wynn of AllMusic wrote: "The Manhattans tried to return to the soul form of past years with this mid-'80s release. It contained songs written and produced by the great Bobby Womack and less pop/crossover arrangements and influences. Gerald Alston was preparing to leave the group, but still sang with his customary warmth and style. But the person who made the most impact on this album was new co-vocalist Regina Belle..."

== Track listing ==
No.	Title	Writer(s)	Length
1.	"Change of Heart"	Barbara Morr, Eddie Roll, Gerald Alston, Kendal Stubbs, Khalis Bayyan	4:50
2.	"Where Did We Go Wrong?" (featuring Regina Belle)	Kathy Bloxson a.k.a. Sasha	5:00
3.	"All I Need"	Barbara Morr, Gerald Alston	3:30
4.	"I'm Through Trying to Prove My Love to You"	Bobby Womack	5:25
5.	"Mr D.J."	Bobby Womack	4:48
6.	"Back into the Night"	Jesse Barish, Terry Shaddick	5:05
7.	"Just Like You"	Jeff Pescetto	4:08
8.	"Maybe Tomorrow" (featuring Regina Belle)	Roxanne Seeman, Eddie del Barrio	4:18
9.	"Don't Look Into My Eyes"	Brian Potter, Frank Wildhorn	4:02
10.	"Neither One of Us (Wants to Be The First to Say Goodbye)"	Jim Weatherly	4:32
