= The Day Life Began =

Studio album by Regina Belle
- Released: January 22, 2016
- Length: 39:53
- Label: Shanachie
- Producer: Jack Kugell; Jamie Jones; Monte Neuble; Tim Stewart

Regina Belle chronology
Higher (2012)	The Day Life Began (2016)	My Colorful Christmas (2022)

The Day Life Began is the tenth studio album by American singer Regina Belle. It was released by Shanachie Records on January 22, 2016, and was Belle's first album in four years as well as her debut with Shanachie Records. The album peaked at number 11 on the US Top Gospel Albums.

== Critical reception ==
Justin Kantor from SoulTracks wrote that "the production budget may be tighter than on previous records, but Belle demonstrates the purity and classiness fans crave from her on a well-rounded, ten-song set comprised of sophisticated melodies and thought-provoking lyrics. Primary album producers The Heavyweights provide Belle with feel-good tracks that complement the celebratory nature of her interpretations on numbers ranging in tone from the funky "It’s Alright" to the lush, mellow "You"."

== Track listing ==
The Day Life Began track listing
No.	Title	Writer(s)	Length
1.	"The Day Life Began"	David Frank; Guy Sebastian; Jamie Jones	4:02
2.	"He's Alright"	Jack Kugell; Jones; Monte Neuble; Regina Belle; Tim Stewart	4:03
3.	"You Know How to Love Me"	James Mtume; Reginald G. Lucas	4:06
4.	"Imperfect Love"	Jones; Kimberly Brewer; Belle	4:36
5.	"You"	Kugell; Jones; M. Neuble	3:47
6.	"Live 4 You"	Kugell; Jones; M. Neuble; Belle; Robert Louis Daniels	3:30
7.	"You Saw the Good In Me"	Darrell Crooks; Kugell; Jones; Belle	4:30
8.	"Open Our Eyes"	Walker; Glenn Piper; R. Belle	3:32
9.	"A Night of Love"	G'harah "PK" Degeddingseze; Jones	4:20
10.	"Be Careful Out There"	Allen Shamblin; Steve Diamond	3:27
Total length:			39:53

== Charts ==
Chart performance for The Day Life Began
Chart (2016)	Peak position
US Top Gospel Albums (Billboard)	11
