= This Is Regina! =

Studio album by Regina Belle
- Released: October 23, 2001
- Length: 51:53
- Label: Peak
- Producer: Ira Antelis; Barry J. Eastmond; Frayne Lewis; Chris Robinson; Darrel Smith

Regina Belle chronology
Believe in Me (1998)	This Is Regina! (2001)	Lazy Afternoon (2004)

This Is Regina! is the sixth studio album by American singer Regina Belle. It was released by Peak Records on October 23, 2001, in the United States. Her debut with the label, following her departure from Columbia Records and a short stint with MCA Records, Belle teamed again with Barry J. Eastmond, producer on her second album, Stay with Me (1989), to work on the majority of This Is Regina!. Upon release, the album peaked at number 61 on the US Top R&B/Hip-Hop Albums and number 26 on the Independent Albums. Only single, "Oooh Boy," peaked at number 68 on the Hot R&B/Hip-Hop Songs and number 64 on the Hot R&B/Hip-Hop Airplay.

== Critical reception ==
Professional ratings
Review scores
Source	Rating
AllMusic	4/5 stars

Allmusic editor Jose F. Promis found that "This Is Regina follows in the traditional Regina Belle formula: lush, sophisticated quiet storm ballads, augmented by Belle's strong, warm, elegant, inviting vocals. The album steers clear of anything too adventurous, which is just fine, because Belle's fans have come to love her for her reliability as an old friend who returns every few years with a fresh set of new, yet familiar songs [...] In short, save for a few left turns, this adequately titled album is pure Regina Belle and will undoubtedly please the sophisticated songstress' many fans."

== Track listing ==
No.	Title	Writer(s)	Producer(s)	Length
1.	"Oooh Boy"	Barry J. Eastmond; Regina Belle	Eastmond	4:44
2.	"Let Me Hold You"	Ira Antelis	Frayne Lewis; Chris Robinson; Antelis	3:52
3.	"From Now On" (featuring Glenn Jones)	Eastmond; Gordon Chambers; Phil Gladstone	Eastmond	4:31
4.	"La Da Di" (featuring MC Lyte)	Darrel Smith; Belle; Sam Sims; Lana Moorer	Smith; Sims	3:38
5.	"Gotta Get Over This Love"	Alma Hopkins; Robinson; Antelis	Robinson; Antelis	4:28
6.	"Don't Wanna Go Home"	Robinson; Belle	Robinson	3:55
7.	"Someone Who Needs Me"	Eastmond; Belle	Eastmond	4:10
8.	"Take My Time"	Eastmond; Belle	Eastmond	5:00
9.	"Johnny's Back"	Eastmond; Belle	Eastmond	3:55
10.	"You Said"	Robinson; Antelis	Robinson; Antelis	3:55
11.	"Gotta Go Back"	Smith; Belle; Sims	Smith; Sims	4:46
12.	"What If"	Nolan Williams, Jr.; Belle	Smith; Sims	4:23

== Charts ==
Chart (2002)	Peak position
US Independent Albums (Billboard)	26
US Top R&B/Hip-Hop Albums (Billboard)	61
