= Make It Like It Was =

Single by Regina Belle

from the album Stay with Me
- Released: March 17, 1990
- Recorded: 1989
- Genre: R&B; soul; pop
- Length: 5:07 (album version); 4:04 (radio edit)
- Label: Columbia
- Songwriter: Carvin Winans
- Producer: Nick Martinelli

Regina Belle singles chronology
"What Goes Around" (1989)	"Make It Like It Was" (1990)	"This Is Love" (1990)

"Make It Like It Was" is a 1990 R&B/soul song written by Carvin Winans and recorded by American singer–songwriter Regina Belle from Belle's 1989 album, Stay with Me. Released as a single on March 17, 1990, it spent one week at number one on the R&B singles chart, reached number five on the Adult Contemporary chart, and peaked at number forty-three on the Billboard Hot 100.

== Chart positions ==
Chart (1989–1990)	Peak position
U.S. Billboard Hot 100	43
U.S. Billboard Adult Contemporary	5
U.S. Billboard Hot Black Singles	1

== Official versions ==
- Album version (5:07)
- Radio edit (4:04)

== See also ==
- List of Hot R&B Singles number ones of 1990
