= Believe in Me (Regina Belle album) =

Studio album by Regina Belle
- Released: June 9, 1998
- Genre: R&B
- Length: 44:49
- Label: MCA
- Producer: Bernard Belle; Greg Charley; Erik "E-Smooth" Hicks; Mike & Manni

Regina Belle chronology
Reachin' Back (1995)	Believe in Me (1998)	This Is Regina! (2001)

Believe in Me is the fifth studio album by American singer Regina Belle. It was released by MCA Records on June 9, 1998, in the United States. Belle's first and only release with MCA, she worked with producer and songwriter Erik "E-Smooth" Hicks on the majority of the album. Believe in Me received generally positive reviews but became her lowest-charting album yet, peaking at number 42 on the US Top R&B/Hip-Hop Albums chart. It earned a Grammy Award nomination for Best Traditional R&B Vocal Album in 1999, and produced the singles, "I've Had Enough" and "Don't Let Go".

== Critical reception ==
Professional ratings
Review scores
Source	Rating
AllMusic	4/5 stars

AllMusic editor John Jones called Believe in Me Belle's "strongest release" yet. He found that "Belle manages to utilize slick, hip production and update her sound without forgetting the most important element: strong hooks and well-written tunes. Eric "E-Smooth" Hicks provides the production backdrop for eight of the album's tracks, giving Belle the strongest rhythmic push her music has ever had [...] Even a couple of less interesting pop tunes aren't enough to weigh this project down. Filled with memorable hooks and irresistible grooves, Believe in Me finds Regina Belle at the top of her game."

== Track listing ==
No.	Title	Writer(s)	Producer(s)	Length
1.	"Believe in Me"	Erik "E Smooth" Hicks	Hicks	4:09
2.	"Don't Let Go"	Hicks; Regina Belle	Hicks; Mike & Manni^{[a]}	3:15
3.	"I Got It"	Hicks; Melky Jean	Hicks; Mike & Manni^{[a]}	4:08
4.	"You Make Me Smile" (featuring Tichina Arnold)	Hicks; Belle	Hicks; Mike & Manni^{[a]}	4:06
5.	"Baby Love"	Hicks; Belle	Hicks; Mike & Manni^{[a]}	3:37
6.	"I Gotch U"	Bernard Belle	Belle	3:35
7.	"I've Had Enough"	Greg Charley	Charley	4:40
8.	"Never Should Have Let You Go"	David Foster; Charley; John Winston	Charley	4:27
9.	"Teach Me How to Live"	Bruce Roberts; Junior Miles	Hicks; Mike & Manni^{[a]}	3:53
10.	"Come See About Me"	Hicks	Hicks; Mike & Manni^{[a]}	3:54
11.	"Be in Love Again"	Hicks; Belle	Hicks; Mike & Manni^{[a]}	5:05
12.	"I'm the One"	Hicks	Hicks	4:03

Notes

- ^{^[a]} denotes a co-producer

== Charts ==
Chart (1998)	Peak position
US Top R&B/Hip-Hop Albums (Billboard)	42
