= List of Hot Adult Contemporary number ones of 1994 =

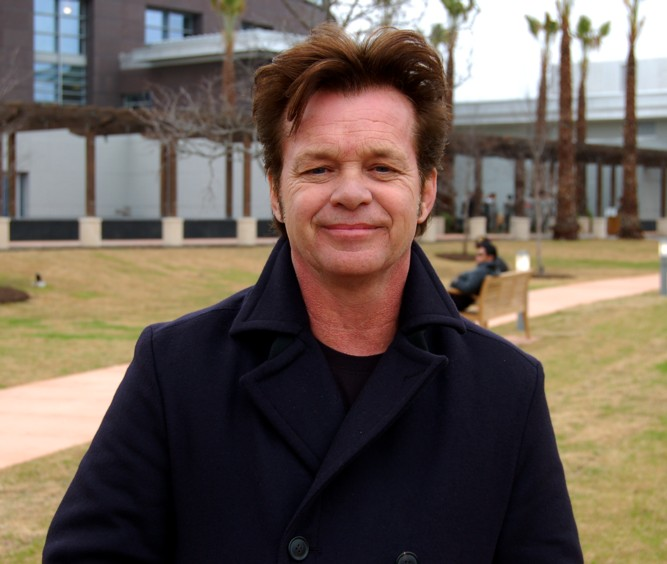
John Mellencamp topped the chart for eight weeks with a cover version of Van Morrison's "Wild Night", recorded in collaboration with Me'shell Ndegeocello.

In 1994, Billboard magazine published a chart ranking the top-performing songs in the United States in the adult contemporary music (AC) market. The chart, which in 1994 was published under the title Hot Adult Contemporary, has undergone various name changes during its history but has been published as Adult Contemporary since 1996. In 1994, eight songs topped the chart, based on weekly airplay data from radio stations compiled by Nielsen Broadcast Data Systems.

At the start of the year, Michael Bolton was at number one with "Said I Loved You...But I Lied", retaining a position that the song had occupied at the end of 1993. The song remained at number one through the issue of Billboard dated February 19 for a final total of 12 weeks atop the chart, tying the record for the longest unbroken run at number one on the AC listing set by the song that it had displaced from the top spot, "The River of Dreams" by Billy Joel. The longest run at number one to take place wholly during 1994 was achieved by Richard Marx with his song "Now and Forever", which came one week short of the record, spending 11 consecutive weeks in the top spot. As no artist had more than one chart-topper during the year, Marx thus also spent the highest number of weeks at number one of any act during the year.

Two consecutive chart-toppers in the summer came from film soundtracks. In the issue of Billboard dated June 11, Madonna reached number one with the song "I'll Remember", from the soundtrack of the comedy-drama film With Honors. After four weeks in the top spot, it was displaced by "Can You Feel the Love Tonight" by Elton John, as featured in the animated film The Lion King. John's song won both the Academy Award for Best Original Song and the Golden Globe Award for Best Original Song as well as the Grammy Award for Best Male Pop Vocal Performance. The year's final number one was "I'll Make Love to You" by the R&B group Boyz II Men, which held the top spot for the final two weeks of 1994. The track also reached the top spot on the Hot R&B Singles listing, and was one of two of 1994's AC number ones to also top Billboard's pop music chart, the Hot 100, the other being Celine Dion's cover version of Jennifer Rush's 1984 song "The Power of Love".

== Chart history ==
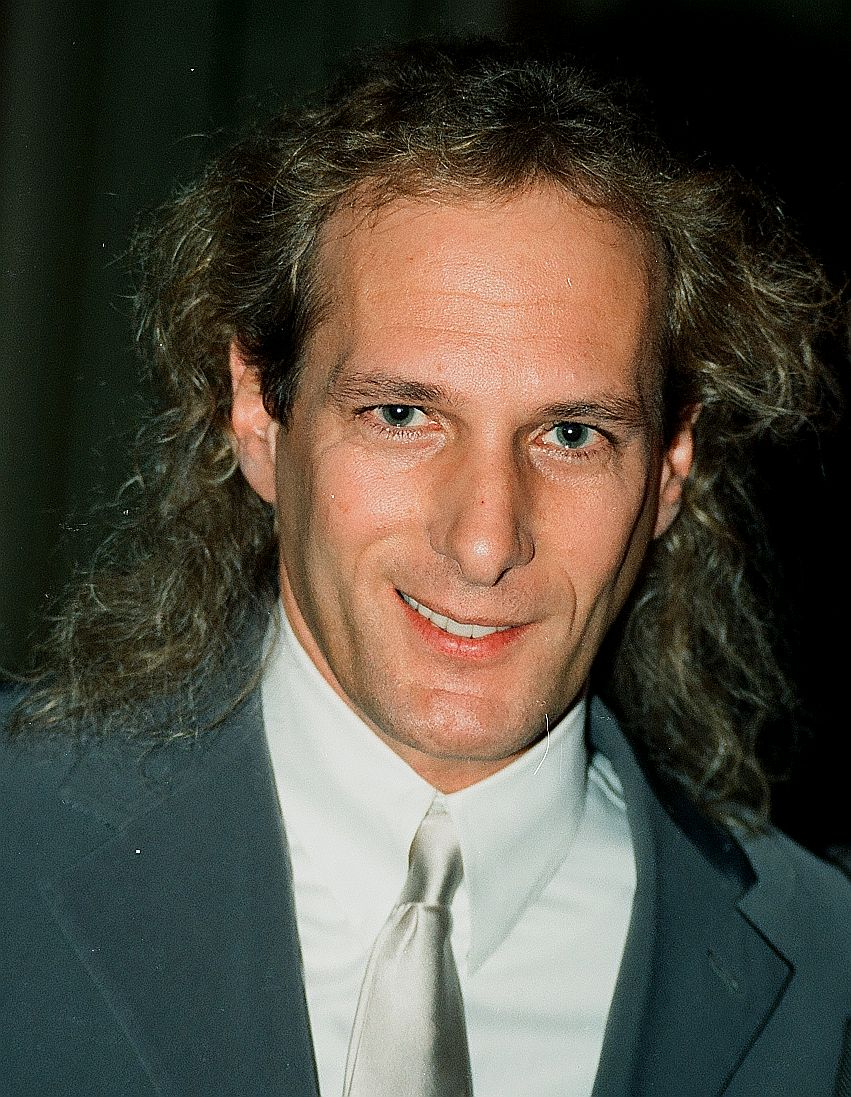
Michael Bolton began the year at number one with his song "Said I Loved You...But I Lied".

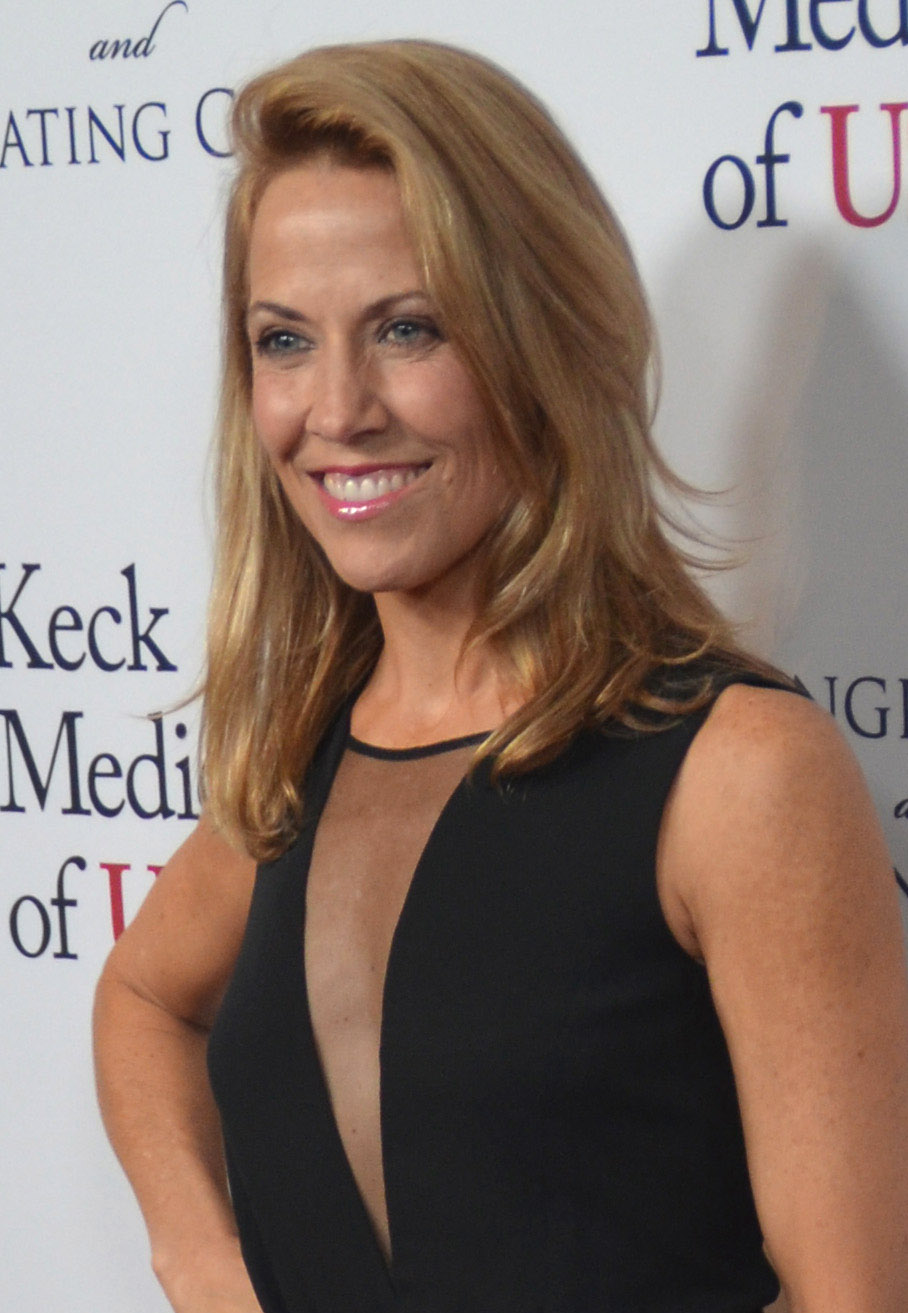
Sheryl Crow topped the chart for eight weeks with "All I Wanna Do".

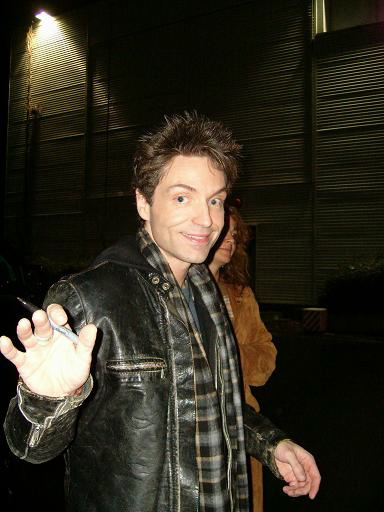
"Now and Forever" by Richard Marx spent 11 consecutive weeks at number one.

Chart history
Issue date	Title	Artist(s)	Ref.
January 1	"Said I Loved You...But I Lied"	Michael Bolton	
January 8	"Said I Loved You...But I Lied"	Michael Bolton	
January 15	"Said I Loved You...But I Lied"	Michael Bolton	
January 22	"Said I Loved You...But I Lied"	Michael Bolton	
January 29	"Said I Loved You...But I Lied"	Michael Bolton	
February 5	"Said I Loved You...But I Lied"	Michael Bolton	
February 12	"Said I Loved You...But I Lied"	Michael Bolton	
February 19	"Said I Loved You...But I Lied"	Michael Bolton	
February 26	"The Power of Love"	Celine Dion	
March 5	"The Power of Love"	Celine Dion	
March 12	"The Power of Love"	Celine Dion	
March 19	"The Power of Love"	Celine Dion	
March 26	"Now and Forever"	Richard Marx	
April 2	"Now and Forever"	Richard Marx	
April 9	"Now and Forever"	Richard Marx	
April 16	"Now and Forever"	Richard Marx	
April 23	"Now and Forever"	Richard Marx	
April 30	"Now and Forever"	Richard Marx	
May 7	"Now and Forever"	Richard Marx	
May 14	"Now and Forever"	Richard Marx	
May 21	"Now and Forever"	Richard Marx	
May 28	"Now and Forever"	Richard Marx	
June 4	"Now and Forever"	Richard Marx	
June 11	"I'll Remember"	Madonna	
June 18	"I'll Remember"	Madonna	
June 25	"I'll Remember"	Madonna	
July 2	"I'll Remember"	Madonna	
July 9	"Can You Feel the Love Tonight"	Elton John	
July 16	"Can You Feel the Love Tonight"	Elton John	
July 23	"Can You Feel the Love Tonight"	Elton John	
July 30	"Can You Feel the Love Tonight"	Elton John	
August 6	"Can You Feel the Love Tonight"	Elton John	
August 13	"Can You Feel the Love Tonight"	Elton John	
August 20	"Can You Feel the Love Tonight"	Elton John	
August 27	"Can You Feel the Love Tonight"	Elton John	
September 3	"Wild Night"	John Mellencamp featuring Me'shell Ndegeocello	
September 10	"Wild Night"	John Mellencamp featuring Me'shell Ndegeocello	
September 17	"Wild Night"	John Mellencamp featuring Me'shell Ndegeocello	
September 24	"Wild Night"	John Mellencamp featuring Me'shell Ndegeocello	
October 1	"Wild Night"	John Mellencamp featuring Me'shell Ndegeocello	
October 8	"Wild Night"	John Mellencamp featuring Me'shell Ndegeocello	
October 15	"Wild Night"	John Mellencamp featuring Me'shell Ndegeocello	
October 22	"Wild Night"	John Mellencamp featuring Me'shell Ndegeocello	
October 29	"All I Wanna Do"	Sheryl Crow	
November 5	"All I Wanna Do"	Sheryl Crow	
November 12	"All I Wanna Do"	Sheryl Crow	
November 19	"All I Wanna Do"	Sheryl Crow	
November 26	"All I Wanna Do"	Sheryl Crow	
December 3	"All I Wanna Do"	Sheryl Crow	
December 10	"All I Wanna Do"	Sheryl Crow	
December 17	"All I Wanna Do"	Sheryl Crow	
December 24	"I'll Make Love to You"	Boyz II Men	
December 31	"I'll Make Love to You"	Boyz II Men	

== See also ==
- 1994 in music
- List of artists who reached number one on the U.S. Adult Contemporary chart
