= Lazy Afternoon (Regina Belle album) =

Studio album by Regina Belle
- Released: July 13, 2004
- Studio: LeGonks West (West Hollywood, California)
- Genre: Jazz; funk; soul
- Length: 62:33
- Label: Peak
- Producer: George Duke

Regina Belle chronology
This Is Regina! (2001)	Lazy Afternoon (2004)	Love Forever Shines (2008)

Lazy Afternoon is the seventh studio album by American singer Regina Belle. It was released by Peak Records on July 13, 2004, in the United States. The album is a collection of jazz, soul, and pop standards. It peaked at number 9 on the Billboard Top Contemporary Jazz chart and number 58 on the magazine's Top R&B/Hip-Hop Albums. Belle's rendition of the Isley Brothers song "For the Love of You" served as the album's lead single. "Fly Me to the Moon" and "If I Ruled the World" each received some airplay but did not chart.

== Critical reception ==
Professional ratings
Review scores
Source	Rating
AllMusic	4/5 stars

Allmusic editor Scott Yanow wrote that "what is particularly unusual about this set [...] is the repertoire. Over half of the songs are jazz standards, and it is a particular treat hearing Belle's soulful renditions [...] The music is not really jazz (although it hints at it), but the jazz tunes give Belle an opportunity to stretch both herself and the format a bit. George Duke is a major asset as both a producer and a keyboardist, Everette Harp takes a few tenor and alto solos, and The Perry Sisters contribute some powerful background vocals on half of the tracks."

== Track listing ==
All tracks were produced and arranged by George Duke.

No.	Title	Writer(s)	Original artist(s)	Length
1.	"Lazy Afternoon"	John La Touche; Jerome Moross	Kaye Ballard	5:21
2.	"Fly Me to the Moon"	Bart Howard	Ballard	5:24
3.	"What Are You Afraid of"	Jack Segal; Robert Wells	Juliet Prowse	4:49
4.	"If I Ruled the World"	Leslie Bricusse; Cyril Ornadel	Harry Secombe	4:36
5.	"Corcovado"	Antônio Carlos Jobim	João Gilberto	5:56
6.	"There's a Love"	Regina Belle; Duke		4:05
7.	"Why Do People Fall in Love"	Dennis Lambert; Brian Potter	Dennis Edwards featuring Thelma Houston	4:53
8.	"For the Love of You"	Ernie Isley; Marvin Isley; O'Kelly Isley; Ronald Isley	The Isley Brothers	5:26
9.	"If I Should Lose You"	Belle		4:34
10.	"Moanin'"	Jon Hendricks; Bobby Timmons	Lambert, Hendricks & Ross	5:51
11.	"The Man I Love"	George Gershwin; Ira Gershwin	Marion Harris	5:19
12.	"Try a Little Tenderness"	Jimmy Campbell; Reginald Connelly; Harry Woods	Ray Noble Orchestra with Val Rosing	6:19

Note

- "For the Love of You" is also based on and performed in medley with "The Love I Lost" by Harold Melvin & the Blue Notes.

== Personnel ==
Credits adapted from the album's liner notes.

- Regina Belle – vocals, vocal arrangements
- George Duke – keyboards (1, 2, 4–7), acoustic piano (3, 9–11), Fender Rhodes (8), Wurlitzer electric piano (12), organ (12)
- Ray Fuller – guitars (1–7, 10–12)
- Dean Parks – acoustic guitar (4, 5)
- Alex Al – electric bass (1, 4, 6)
- Christian McBride – electric bass (2, 5, 7, 10, 12), upright bass (3, 11)
- Gordon Campbell – drums (1, 4, 10)
- Lenny Castro – percussion (1–7, 11), tambourine (10)
- Everette Harp – tenor saxophone (1, 2, 10, 12), alto saxophone (3, 6, 12), tenor sax solo (5)
- Oscar Brashear – flugelhorn (1), trumpet (2, 3, 5, 10, 11)
- Darlene Perry – backing vocals (2, 5–8)
- Lori Perry – backing vocals (2, 5–8)
- Sharon Perry – backing vocals (2, 5–8), coloratura (3)
- Diana Moreira Booker – spoken word (5)

Production

- Russ Freeman – executive producer
- Andi Howard – executive producer
- Mark Wexler – executive producer
- Regina Belle – co-executive producer
- Mervyn Dash – co-executive producer, management
- Erik Zobler – recording, mixing, mastering
- Stefaniah McGowan – assistant engineer
- Andrew Papastephanou – technician
- Corine Duke – production coordinator
- Valerie Ince – A&R coordinator
- Sonny Mediana – art direction, design
- Randee St. Nicholas – photography
- Vivian Turner – wardrobe
- Miriam Vucich – make-up
- Sean Smith – hair
- Coast To Coast Mgnt. Inc. – management company

== Charts ==
Chart (2004)	Peak position
US Top Contemporary Jazz Albums (Billboard)	9
US Top R&B/Hip-Hop Albums (Billboard)	58
