= Michael J. Powell =

American musician

Michael J. Powell is an American R&B musician, record producer and arranger who is best known for his work as producer for eight time Grammy Award-winning soul / R&B vocalist Anita Baker.

Powell was born in Chicago and lived there until his family moved to Detroit when he was nine years old. In 1974, he formed a band called Chapter 8. A year later, Anita Baker joined Chapter 8 in Detroit. They eventually got a record deal with Ariola.

The self-titled album came out in fall of 1979. Two singles hit the R&B charts: "Ready for Your Love" and "I Just Wanna Be Your Girl". Ariola Records was bought by Arista. In 1983, Powell reunited with Baker and had a hit single with “No More Tears” featured on her album The Songstress.

Beginning in 1986, Baker collaborated with producer Michael J. Powell and keyboardist Sir Dean Gant on a series of critically acclaimed projects. This partnership resulted in three multi-platinum albums Rapture in 1986, Giving You the Best That I Got in 1988 (which reached Number 1 on The Billboard 200) and Compositions in 1990.

Together with co-producer Sir Gant, Powell worked in 1987 as co-producer and arranger of the song "Without You", a composition of Lamont Dozier, that was recorded as a duet by the R&B singers Peabo Bryson and Regina Belle. The song was the love theme from the comedy film Leonard Part 6, released the same year, starred Bill Cosby, and was also recorded for Bryson's album Positive, released in 1988.

Powell also worked on "Without You" as guitarist. The song was released as a single and peaked at No. 8 on the Adult Contemporary Tracks, No. 14 on the R&B chart, No. 85 on the UK Singles, and No. 89 on the Billboard Hot 100, between 1987 and 1988.

In 1991, Powell helped produce Patti LaBelle's Grammy-winning album, Burnin' and Gladys Knight's solo album Good Woman, both on MCA Records.
