= Higher (Regina Belle album) =

Studio album by Regina Belle
- Released: June 5, 2012
- Studio: Canvas Studios (Houston); SGC Studios (Detroit)
- Length: 52:27
- Label: Pendulum
- Producer: Regina Belle; PAJAM; Micah Stampley; Terence Vaughn; Chris Walker; Cory Washington

Regina Belle chronology
Love Forever Shines (2008)	Higher (2012)	The Day Life Began (2016)

Higher is the ninth studio album by American singer Regina Belle. It was released by Pendulum Records on June 5, 2012. The album peaked at number 15 on the Billboard Top Gospel Albums chart and number 44 on the Top R&B/Hip-Hop Albums chart. It produced the single "Make an Example Out of Me", which peaked at number 19 on the Billboard Hot Gospel Songs chart.

== Critical reception ==
Professional ratings
Review scores
Source	Rating
AllMusic	3.5/5 stars

AllMusic reviewer Steve Leggett wrote that "Belle may not be tracking secular material any longer (she still features her secular hits in her live shows, where they fit comfortably with her newer gospel numbers), but she isn't afraid to use secular music touches from jazz, hip-hop, R&B, and soul in these tracks, creating an energetic and joyous urban pop gospel style that isn't too far removed in sound from her straight pop work. Everybody wins."

== Track listing ==
No.	Title	Writer(s)	Producer(s)	Length
1.	"Higher"	Chris Walker; Orlando Dixon; Regina Belle; Terence Vaughn	Vaughn	4:04
2.	"Mighty in Battle"	Walker; James Brooks; R. Belle	Walker; Vaughn	3:19
3.	"Make an Example Out of Me"	Heidi Stampley; Micah Stampley	M. Stampley	5:52
4.	"The Lord Is with You"	Walker; R. Belle	Walker; Vaughn	4:14
5.	"That's How God Does"	James Moss	PAJAM	3:48
6.	"God Must Have Been With You"	T. Jones	Walker; Vaughn	4:48
7.	"Been So Good to Me"	Walker; R. Belle	Walker	3:59
8.	"Let God Work It Out"	Walker; Glenn Piper; R. Belle	Walker; Vaughn	4:22
9.	"Coming Back"	Moss; Paul Allen; Rodrick Long	PAJAM	3:51
10.	"We Win"	Cory Washington; R. Belle	Washington	3:45
11.	"Lord of All"	Jahmel Belle; Tyrell Belle; Tyrone Belle	Walker; R. Belle	5:46
12.	"I Will Bless the Lord"	Kathy Taylor	Walker; Vaughn	4:37

== Charts ==
Chart (2012)	Peak position
US Top Gospel Albums (Billboard)	15
US Top R&B/Hip-Hop Albums (Billboard)	44
