= Passion (Regina Belle album) =

Studio album by Regina Belle
- Released: February 16, 1993
- Studio: Tarpan Studios (San Rafael, California); Ocean Way Recording (Hollywood, California); Record Plant (Los Angeles, California); The Plant Studios (Sausalito, California); Encore Studios (Burbank, California); Criteria Studios and Afterhours Recording Studio (North Miami, Florida); Right Track Recording and Quad Recording Studios (New York City, New York)
- Genre: R&B; funk / soul; jazz; electronic
- Length: 50:29
- Label: Columbia
- Producer: Walter Afanasieff; James Anthony Carmichael; Nick Martinelli; Narada Michael Walden

Regina Belle chronology
Stay with Me (1989)	Passion (1993)	Reachin' Back (1995)

Passion is the third studio album by American singer Regina Belle. It was released by Columbia Records on February 16, 1993, in the United States. Belle consulted producers James Anthony Carmichael, Nick Martinelli, and Narada Michael Walden to work with her on the album. Upon release, it peaked at number 63 on the US Billboard 200 and number 13 on the Top R&B/Hip-Hop Albums, selling over 389,000 copies according to Nielsen Soundscan.

The album produced the singles, "Dream in Color", "If I Could" and "The Deeper I Love," the latter of which failed to reach the main chart but did peak at number 7 on the Bubbling Under R&B/Hip-Hop Singles chart. Passion also includes "A Whole New World," Belle's duet with Peabo Bryson from Disney's 1992 animated film Aladdin (1992).

== Critical reception ==
Professional ratings
Review scores
Source	Rating
AllMusic	4/5 stars
Entertainment Weekly	B−
Music Week	3/5 stars

AllMusic editor Craig Lytle found that with Passion "Belle presents an album that steadfastly utilizes her vocal attributes [...] Every song here is worthy of chart attention. The majority of the songs are ballads and mid-tempo numbers [...] As the title indicates, Belle extends much passion in each one of these songs. She's lacking nothing on any one of these performances and the material is appropriately suited to the songstress [...] From the jazzy blues to the soulful R&B and pop-oriented tunes, Belle's vocals are mesmerizing to the last note."

== Track listing ==
No.	Title	Writer(s)	Producer(s)	Length
1.	"Interlude"/"Passion"	Narada Michael Walden; Regina Belle	Walden; Mike Mani^{[a]}; Monty Seward^{[a]}	5:56
2.	"Quiet Time" (featuring Barry White)	Silvia Grissette; Steve Grissette; Tim Gant; Tyrone Dickerson	Nick Martinelli	5:09
3.	"If I Could"	Ken Hirsch; Marti Sharron; Ronald Miller	Martinelli	4:03
4.	"Do You Wanna Get Serious"	Dawn Thomas	Martinelli	5:34
5.	"Dream in Color"	April Lang; Shelly Peiken	Martinelli	4:13
6.	"My Man"	Maurice Yvain; Channing Pollock	James Anthony Carmichael	4:50
7.	"The Deeper I Love"	Laney Stewart; Tony Haynes	Martinelli	4:55
8.	"A Whole New World" (duet with Peabo Bryson)	Tim Rice; Alan Menken	Walter Afanasieff	4:08
9.	"Love"	Clyde Lieberman; DeNetria Champ; Laythan Armor	Martinelli	5:55
10.	"Heaven's Just a Whisper Away"	Anthony Smith; Keith Diamond; Larry Henley	Carmichael	3:56
11.	"Tango in Paris"	Kitty Beethoven; Mani; Moe Dewese; Walden; Vernon Black	Walden	4:12
12.	"One Love"	Brenda Russell; Walden	Walden	5:49

Notes

- ^{^[a]} denotes an associate producer

== Personnel ==
- Regina Belle – vocals, backing vocals (1, 2, 4, 5, 7)
- Mike Mani – keyboards (1, 11), programming (1, 11)
- Monty Seward – keyboards (1), programming (1)
- Greg Phillinganes – keyboards (2, 3, 6, 10), acoustic piano (5), synthesizers (6, 10)
- Lester Mendez – synthesizers (2–5), keyboards (7), drum programming (7)
- Odeen Mays – keyboards (5, 9)
- John Barnes – keyboards (6, 10), synthesizers (6, 10), Synclavier (6, 10), additional percussion (6, 10), arrangements (6, 10)
- James Anthony Carmichael – keyboards (6, 10), synthesizers (6, 10)
- Lloyd Tolbert – keyboards (6, 10), synthesizers (6, 10), additional percussion (6)
- Walter Afanasieff – keyboards (8), Synclavier acoustic guitar (8), synth bass (8), rhythm programming (8), arrangements (8)
- Ren Klyce – Akai programming (8), Synclavier programming (8)
- Gary Cirimelli – Macintosh programming (8), Synclavier programming (8)
- Dan Shea – additional programming (8)
- Eddie Montilla – synthesizers (9)
- Frank Martin – keyboards (12), programming (12), string arrangements and conductor (12)
- Paul Jackson Jr. – guitars (2, 5, 6, 10)
- Manny López – guitars (3), rock guitar solo (7)
- Randy Bowland – guitars (4, 9)
- Tim May – guitars (6, 10)
- Steve Gordon – rhythm guitar (7)
- Michael Landau – guitars (8)
- Vernon "Ice" Black – guitar synthesizer (11), synth bass (11), guitars (12)
- Narada Michael Walden – bass (1), arrangements (1, 11, 12), drums (12)
- Neil Stubenhaus – bass (2, 5, 6, 10)
- Leland Sklar – bass (3)
- Chris Walker – bass (4, 9), backing vocals (4, 9)
- Joel Smith – electric bass (12)
- John Robinson – drums (2, 5, 6, 10)
- Ricky Lawson – drums (3)
- Daryl Burgee – drums (4, 9)
- Rafael Solano – percussion (2–5, 9)
- Allen Varin – percussion (6, 10)
- Marquinho Brasil – percussion (12)
- Kirk Whalum – saxophone solo (4, 9)
- Ed Calle – horns (4, 9)
- Dana Teboe – horns (4, 9)
- Tony Concepcion – horns (4, 9)
- Arturo Sandoval – horns (4, 9)
- Jack Faith – string arrangements (3, 5)
- Ricardo Eddy – horn arrangements (4, 9)
- Robbie Buchanan – additional arrangements (8)
- Kitty Beethoven – backing vocals (1, 11, 12), vocal arrangements (11)
- Nikita Germaine – backing vocals (1, 11, 12)
- Tony Lindsay – backing vocals (1, 11), spoken word (1)
- Claytoven Richardson – backing vocals (1, 11)
- Cynthia Biggs – backing vocals (2, 7)
- Charlene Holloway – backing vocals (2, 5, 7)
- Barry White – special guest vocals (2)
- Marvel Allen – backing vocals (4, 9)
- Charles Christopher – backing vocals (5)
- Aisha McCray – backing vocals (5)
- Wendy Pedersen – backing vocals (5)
- Rita Quintero – backing vocals (5)
- Carl Ramsey – backing vocals (5)
- Betty Wright – backing vocals (5)
- Jeanette Wright – backing vocals (5)
- Peabo Bryson – vocals (8)
- Kool Moe Dee – rap (11)
- Skyler Jett – backing vocals (12)
- Steve Zegree – backing vocals (12), choir director (12)
- The Gagie School Children's choir – choir (12)

== Production ==
- Brenda Dash – executive producer, management
- Jay Landers – executive producer
- Janice Lee – production coordinator (1, 11, 12)
- Kelly McRae – production coordinator (1, 11, 12)
- Cynthia Shiloh – production coordinator (1, 11, 12)
- Kevin Walden – production coordinator (1, 11, 12)
- Josephine DiDonato – art direction
- Resig & Taylor – photography
- Vaughn Harper – liner notes
- Mervyn Dash – management
- Coast To Coast Mgmt, Inc. – management company

Technical credits

- Vlado Meller – mastering at Sony Music Studio Operations (New York City, New York)
- Marc Reyburn – engineer (1)
- David Frazer – vocal recording (1), vocal mixing (1)
- Jack Perry – engineer (2)
- Bruce Weeden – engineer (2–5, 9), mix engineer (7)
- Michael H. Brauer – mix engineer (2, 3, 5)
- Barney Perkins – engineer (6, 10)
- Hal Batt – engineer (7)
- Eric Schilling – engineer (7)
- Dana Jon Chappelle – engineer (8)
- Jeff Gray – second engineer (1, 11, 12)
- Mark Krieg – second engineer (4, 7, 9), engineer (7)
- Milton Chen – second engineer (6, 10)
- Kyle Bass – second engineer (8)
- Manny Lacarrubba – second engineer (8)
- Jen Monnar – second engineer (8)

== Personnel ==
- Regina Belle – vocals, backing vocals (1, 2, 4, 5, 7)
- Mike Mani – keyboards (1), programming (1)
- Monty Seaward – keyboards (1), programming (1)
- Greg Phillinganes – keyboards (2)
- Lester Mendez – synthesizers (2)
- Paul Jackson Jr. – guitars (2)
- Narada Michael Walden – bass (1), arrangements (1, 11)
- Neil Stubenhaus – bass (2)
- John Robinson – drums (2)
- Rafael Solano – percussion (2)
- Kitty Beethoven – backing vocals (1)
- Nikita Germaine – backing vocals (1)
- Tony Lindsay – backing vocals (1), spoken word (1)
- Claytoven Richardson – backing vocals (1)
- Cynthia Biggs – backing vocals (2)
- Charlene Holloway – backing vocals (2)
- Barry White – special guest vocals (2)

== Charts ==
Chart (1993)	Peak position
US Billboard 200	63
US Top R&B/Hip-Hop Albums (Billboard)	13

== Certifications ==
Region	Certification	Certified units/sales
United States (RIAA)	Gold	500,000^{^}
^{^} Shipments figures based on certification alone.
