= A Whole New World =

Song from Disney's 1992 animated film Aladdin

Song by Brad Kane and Lea Salonga

from the album Aladdin: Original Motion Picture Soundtrack
- Released: October 31, 1992
- Recorded: 1991
- Genre: Show tune
- Length: 2:40 (soundtrack version)
- Label: Walt Disney
- Composer: Alan Menken
- Lyricist: Tim Rice
- Producers: Alan Menken; Tim Rice; Chris Montan

"A Whole New World" is the signature song from Disney's 1992 animated feature film Aladdin, with music by Alan Menken and lyrics by Tim Rice. A duet originally recorded by singers Brad Kane and Lea Salonga in their respective roles as the singing voices of the main characters Aladdin and Jasmine, the ballad serves as both the film's love and theme song. Lyrically, "A Whole New World" describes Aladdin showing the confined princess a life of freedom and the pair's acknowledgment of their love for each other while riding on a magic carpet.

The song garnered an Academy Award for Best Original Song at the 65th Academy Awards, a Golden Globe Award for Best Original Song at the 50th Golden Globe Awards, and a Grammy Award for Best Song Written Specifically for a Motion Picture or for Television at the 36th Grammy Awards, as well as a Grammy Award for Song of the Year, the only Disney song to do so. In the same year, the pop version sung by Peabo Bryson and Regina Belle was also nominated for Record of the Year and Best Pop Performance by a Duo or Group With Vocals, winning the latter.

Mena Massoud and Naomi Scott performed the song in the live-action version of Aladdin (2019). Zayn Malik and Zhavia Ward did their version of the song for the end credits, the music video of the cover was premiered on May 9, 2019 filmed in New York City.

== Peabo Bryson and Regina Belle pop duet version ==
"A Whole New World (Aladdin's Theme)"

Single by Peabo Bryson and Regina Belle

from the album Aladdin: Original Motion Picture Soundtrack, Passion, and Through the Fire
- B-side: "After the Kiss" (instrumental)
- Released: November 5, 1992
- Genre: Pop
- Length: 4:03 (single version); 4:05 (soundtrack version)
- Label: Walt Disney; Columbia
- Composer: Alan Menken
- Lyricist: Tim Rice
- Producer: Walter Afanasieff

Peabo Bryson singles chronology
"You Are My Home" (1992)	"A Whole New World (Aladdin's Theme)" (1992)	"By the Time This Night Is Over" (1993)

Regina Belle singles chronology
"Better Together" (1992)	"A Whole New World (Aladdin's Theme)" (1992)	"If I Could" (1993)

Licensed audio
- "A Whole New World (Aladdin's Theme)" on YouTube

A single version of the song was released that same year and was performed by American recording artists Peabo Bryson and Regina Belle. This version is played over the film's end credits and is referred to on the soundtrack as "Aladdin's Theme". The version peaked at number one on the US Billboard Hot 100 chart for a week, ending on March 6, 1993, replacing Whitney Houston's "I Will Always Love You", which had spent a then-record 14 weeks at the top of the chart. It went gold and sold 600,000 copies domestically. The track peaked at number 12 on the UK Singles Chart in 1993.

This is the first song from a Disney animated film to top the US Billboard Hot 100. It was the only Disney song to achieve this feat until "We Don't Talk About Bruno" from Encanto reached the summit in 2022. The single version was later included on Belle's studio album Passion (1993) and on Bryson's studio album Through the Fire (1994).

=== Critical reception ===
Alan Jones from Music Week gave the song a full score of five out of five, writing, "The theme from Aladdin is a huge appealing big ballad duet. A melodic tour de force with wide ranging appeal, it is wisely tipped as the Christmas number one."

=== Charts ===
==== Weekly charts ====
Chart (1993–1994)	Peak position
Australia (ARIA)	10
Belgium (Ultratop 50 Flanders)	14
Canada Retail Singles (The Record)	2
Canada Top Singles (RPM)	6
Canada Adult Contemporary (RPM)	1
Europe (Eurochart Hot 100)	24
Europe (European Hit Radio)	26
Germany (GfK)	70
Iceland (Íslenski Listinn Topp 40)	2
Ireland (IRMA)	11
Netherlands (Dutch Top 40)	18
Netherlands (Single Top 100)	14
New Zealand (Recorded Music NZ)	8
UK Singles (Official Charts)	12
UK Airplay (Music Week)	8
US Billboard Hot 100	1
US Adult Contemporary (Billboard)	1
US Hot R&B/Hip-Hop Songs (Billboard)	21
US Pop Airplay (Billboard)	1
US Rhythmic Airplay (Billboard)	18
US Cash Box Top 100	2

==== Year-end charts ====
Chart (1993)	Position
Australia (ARIA)	50
Canada Top Singles (RPM)	56
Canada Adult Contemporary (RPM)	6
New Zealand (RIANZ)	37
US Billboard Hot 100	18
US Adult Contemporary (Billboard)	6
US Hot R&B Singles (Billboard)	98
US Cash Box Top 100	27

Chart (1994)	Position
Iceland (Íslenski Listinn Topp 40)	34
UK Singles (OCC)	182

== Certifications ==
=== Kane and Salonga version ===
Region	Certification	Certified units/sales
Japan (RIAJ) digital	Gold	100,000^{*}
Japan (RIAJ) physical	Platinum	100,000^{^}
New Zealand (RMNZ)	Gold	15,000^{‡}
United Kingdom (BPI)	Platinum	600,000^{‡}
United States (RIAA)	3× Platinum	3,000,000^{‡}
^{*} Sales figures based on certification alone.^{^} Shipments figures based on certification alone.^{‡} Sales+streaming figures based on certification alone.

=== Bryson and Belle version ===
Region	Certification	Certified units/sales
Japan (RIAJ) digital	Gold	100,000^{*}
Japan (RIAJ) physical	Platinum	100,000^{^}
United States (RIAA) physical	Gold	500,000^{^}
^{*} Sales figures based on certification alone.^{^} Shipments figures based on certification alone.

=== Massoud and Scott version ===
Region	Certification	Certified units/sales
Brazil (Pro-Música Brasil)	Gold	20,000^{‡}
United States (RIAA)	Gold	500,000^{‡}
^{‡} Sales+streaming figures based on certification alone.

=== Zayn and Zhavia version ===
Region	Certification	Certified units/sales
Brazil (Pro-Música Brasil)	2× Platinum	80,000^{‡}
Canada (Music Canada)	Gold	40,000^{‡}
Mexico (AMPROFON)	Gold	30,000^{‡}
New Zealand (RMNZ)	Gold	15,000^{‡}
^{‡} Sales+streaming figures based on certification alone.

== Cover versions ==
=== Jose Mari Chan version ===
"A Whole New World"

Single by Jose Mari Chan

from the album Aladdin: Original Motion Picture Soundtrack
- B-side: "A Whole New World"
- Released: 1992
- Genre: Pop; R&B; soul
- Length: 3:56
- Label: Walt Disney; Bell Films
- Composer: Alan Menken
- Lyricist: Tim Rice
- Producer: Rey Magtoto

Jose Mari Chan singles chronology
"A Perfect Christmas" (1990)	"A Whole New World" (1992)	"Is She Thinking About Me?" (1994)

In the Philippines, a version of the song performed by Jose Mari Chan, a Filipino recording artist, was released as a single through Bell Films (a subsidiary of Universal Records) in 1993, coinciding with the Philippine theatrical release of Aladdin on April 30, 1993.

Then-SM Rookies member Jaehyun, who later debuted as a member of boy group NCT and former member Seo Herin performed the song in Disney Channel Korea show Mickey Mouse Club in December 2015.

=== Other cover versions ===
- In 1993, French singers Karine Costa and Daniel Lévi released a French-language version of the song titled "Ce rêve bleu" (English: "This Blue Dream"). This version peaked at number three on the French SNEP Singles Chart in January 1994, ending the year as the country's 21st-most-successful single.
- A cover version by German electro-pop act Sweetbox was included on the 2002 release of the Disneymania compilation album.
- In 2018, Riff Raff and Jonathan Hay created a hip-hop cover of the song for the album The Hoodlum Ball.
- Zayn's vocals were also used for two English-Spanish versions of the song, "Un Mundo Ideal". The Spanish parts were sung for the Latin American market by American singer Becky G and for the Spanish market by Spanish singer Aitana.
- In 2020, Ben Platt and Idina Menzel performed it as part of the TV special The Disney Family Singalong: Volume II.
- In 2024, alt-rock band Yellowcard covered the song for a Disney compilation album titled A Whole New Sound, duetting with Chrissy Costanza from Against the Current.

== See also ==
- List of Hot 100 number-one singles of 1993 (U.S.)
- List of number-one adult contemporary singles of 1993 (U.S.)
- List of Mainstream Top 40 number-one hits of 1993 (U.S.)
