= Forever in Love (instrumental) =

1992 single by Kenny G

- Single cover

Single by Kenny G

from the album Breathless
- Released: 1992
- Genre: Smooth jazz
- Length: 4:58 (album version); 4:08 (single version)
- Label: Arista
- Songwriter: Kenneth Bruce Gorelick
- Producer: Kenny G

Kenny G singles chronology
| "Missing You Now" (1992) | "Forever in Love" (1992) | "By the Time This Night Is Over" (1993) |

"Forever in Love" is an instrumental by American saxophone player Kenny G that was released as a single in 1992 by Arista Records. The song appears on Kenny G's sixth studio album, Breathless (1992), and he both wrote and produced the song. It topped the US and Canadian adult contemporary charts and also reached numbers 16 and 18 on the Cash Box Top 100 and Billboard Hot 100 charts. The song won a Grammy Award for Best Instrumental Composition at the 1994 ceremony.

== Music video ==
A music video for the song featuring a couple as children, and also that couple again, as adults, and Kenny G as the performer.

== Track listing ==
| No. | Title | Length |
|---|---|---|
| 1. | "Forever in Love" | 4:58 |

== Personnel ==
- Kenny G – soprano saxophone, all other instruments, arrangements
- Dean Parks – guitars
- Paulinho da Costa – percussion

== Charts ==
=== Weekly charts ===
| Chart (1993) | Peak position |
|---|---|
| Australia (ARIA) | 49 |
| Canada Top Singles (RPM) | 47 |
| Canada Adult Contemporary (RPM) | 1 |
| Portugal (AFP) | 9 |
| UK Singles (Official Charts) | 47 |
| US Billboard Hot 100 | 18 |
| US Adult Contemporary (Billboard) | 1 |
| US Hot R&B/Hip-Hop Songs (Billboard) | 73 |
| US Pop Airplay (Billboard) | 18 |
| US Rhythmic Airplay (Billboard) | 33 |
| US Cash Box Top 100 | 16 |

=== Year-end charts ===
| Chart (1993) | Position |
|---|---|
| Canada Adult Contemporary (RPM) | 5 |
| US Billboard Hot 100 | 73 |
| US Adult Contemporary (Billboard) | 8 |

== Certifications ==
| Region | Certification | Certified units/sales |
|---|---|---|
| United States (RIAA) | Gold | 500,000^{‡} |
^{‡} Sales+streaming figures based on certification alone.

== Release history ==
| Region | Date | Format(s) | Label(s) | Ref. |
|---|---|---|---|---|
| United States | 1992 | Cassette | Arista | |
| Japan | December 16, 1992 | Mini-CD | BMG Victor | |
| Australia | January 18, 1993 | CD; cassette | Arista | |
| United Kingdom | April 12, 1993 | 7-inch vinyl; CD; cassette | Arista | |
