= By the Time This Night Is Over =

1993 single by Kenny G and Peabo Bryson

Single by Kenny G and Peabo Bryson

from the album Breathless and Through the Fire
- Released: 1993
- Length: 4:45 (album version); 4:23 (single version)
- Label: Arista
- Songwriters: Michael Bolton, Andy Goldmark, Diane Warren
- Producers: Walter Afanasieff, David Foster

Kenny G singles chronology
"Forever in Love" (1992)	"By the Time This Night Is Over" (1993)	"Sentimental" (1993)

Peabo Bryson singles chronology
"A Whole New World" (1992)	"By the Time This Night Is Over" (1993)	"Why Goodbye" (1994)

"By the Time This Night Is Over" is a song by American musician Kenny G and singer-songwriter Peabo Bryson, released as a single from Kenny G's sixth studio album, Breathless, in 1992 and from Bryson's 16th studio album, Through the Fire, in 1994. The song is written by Michael Bolton, Andy Goldmark and Diane Warren, and produced by Walter Afanasieff and David Foster. It peaked at numbers 25 and 26 on the US Billboard Hot 100 and Cash Box Top 100 charts, and number 37 on the Billboard Hot R&B Singles chart. On the Hot Adult Contemporary Tracks chart, "By the Time This Night Is Over" spent two weeks at number one, while in Canada, the song reached number six on the RPM Top Singles chart and number one on the RPM Adult Contemporary chart.

== Personnel ==
- Kenny G – soprano saxophone, arrangements
- Peabo Bryson – lead vocals
- Walter Afanasieff – keyboards, synth bass, drums, rhythm programming, all other instruments, arrangements
- Dan Shea – keyboards, programming
- Gary Cirimelli – Macintosh programming, Synclavier programming
- Ren Klyce – Akai AX60 programming, Synclavier programming
- Michael Thompson – guitars
- Lynn Davis – backing vocals
- Jim Gilstrap – backing vocals
- Portia Griffin – backing vocals
- Pat Hawk – backing vocals
- Phillip Ingram – backing vocals
- Vann Johnson – backing vocals
- Rose Stone – backing vocals
- Fred White – backing vocals

Production

- Producers – Walter Afanasieff and David Foster
- Engineer – Dana Jon Chappelle
- Assistant Engineers – Steve Shepherd and Kevin Becka
- Additional Engineering – David Gleeson, Jeffrey Woodruff, Kevin Becka and Steve Shepherd.
- Mixed by Mick Guzauski

== Charts ==
=== Weekly charts ===
Chart (1993)	Peak position
Australia (ARIA)	122
Canada Top Singles (RPM)	6
Canada Adult Contemporary (RPM)	1
UK Singles (Official Charts)	56
US Billboard Hot 100	25
US Adult Contemporary (Billboard)	1
US Pop Airplay (Billboard)	29
US Hot R&B/Hip-Hop Songs (Billboard)	37
US Cash Box Top 100	26

=== Year-end charts ===
Chart (1993)	Position
Canada Top Singles (RPM)	59
Canada Adult Contemporary (RPM)	18
US Adult Contemporary (Billboard)	15

== Release history ==
Region	Date	Format(s)	Label(s)	Ref.
United States	1993	CD; cassette	Arista	
Australia	May 17, 1993	CD; cassette	Arista	
United Kingdom	July 5, 1993	CD; cassette	Arista	
Japan	July 21, 1993	Mini-CD	Arista	
