= Reachin' Back =

Studio album by Regina Belle
- Released: September 5, 1995
- Studio: The Bennett House (Franklin, Tennessee); On The Way Studios (Cleveland, Ohio); Sigma Sound Studios (Philadelphia, Pennsylvania); FM Studios (Oakland, California); Larrabee North (Universal City, California); Skip Saylor Recording (Los Angeles, California); Capitol Studios (Hollywood, California)
- Genre: Funk / soul; electronic
- Length: 45:56
- Label: Columbia
- Producer: Foster & McElroy; Gerald Levert; Edwin "Tony" Nicholas; Keith Thomas

Regina Belle chronology
Passion (1993)	Reachin' Back (1995)	Believe in Me (1998)

Reachin' Back is the fourth studio album by American singer Regina Belle. It was released by Columbia Records on September 5, 1995, in the United States. A cover album of classic songs, it is dedicated to Philadelphia soul music. The album peaked at number 115 on the ZS Billboard 200 and number 18 on the Top R&B Albums chart. Its first and only single, "Love T.K.O.", peaked at number 29 on the Hot R&B Singles chart.

== Critical reception ==
Professional ratings
Review scores
Source	Rating
AllMusic	2/5 stars
The Philadelphia Inquirer	3.5/4 stars

AllMusic editor Stephen Thomas Erlewine called Reachin' Back "a collection of 11 covers of classic R&B and soul songs, including numbers performed by Al Green and The Spinners. Since their definitive, original performances have become part of the public's collective consciousness, it's unfair to hold Belle's interpretations in comparison, since hers inevitably pale. Taken on their own terms, her versions are well-sung and well-produced, yet slightly uninspired. Fans might find it necessary, but Reachin' Back doesn't rank among her most distinguished efforts."

== Track listing ==
No.	Title	Producer(s)	Length
1.	"Reachin' Back (Intro)"		0:32
2.	"Could It Be I'm Falling in Love"	Keith Thomas	5:13
3.	"Love T.K.O."	Edwin Nicholas; Gerald Levert	5:02
4.	"You Make Me Feel Brand New"	Thomas	5:17
5.	"Hurry Up This Way Again"	Foster & McElroy	3:51
6.	"The Whole Town's Laughing at Me"	Nicholas; Levert	5:11
7.	"You Are Everything"	Thomas	3:45
8.	"Let Me Make Love to You"	Foster & McElroy	4:51
9.	"I'll Be Around"	Thomas	3:43
10.	"Just Don't Want to Be Lonely"	Foster & McElroy	4:07
11.	"Didn't I (Blow Your Mind This Time)"	Foster & McElroy	4:24

== Personnel ==
- Regina Belle – vocals, backing vocals (3, 4, 6, 7), arrangements (8)
- Keith Thomas – synthesizer programming (2, 4, 7, 9), bass programming (2, 4, 7, 9)
- Gerald Levert – keyboards (3, 6), keyboard programming (3, 6), drums (3, 6), sequencing (3, 6), backing vocals (3, 6), vocal arrangements (3, 6)
- Edwin "Tony" Nicholas – keyboards (3, 6), keyboard programming (3, 6), drums (3, 6), sequencing (3, 6), bass guitar (6)
- Foster & McElroy – keyboards (5, 8, 10, 11), drum programming (5, 8, 10, 11)
- Niles McKinney – keyboards (8)
- Randy Bowland – guitars (3, 6)
- Marlon McClain – guitars (5, 8, 10)
- James Early – guitars (8)
- Jerry McPherson – electric guitars (9)
- Nathaniel Phillips – bass (5, 8, 10, 11)
- Mark Hammond – drum programming (2, 4, 7, 9), additional synthesizer programming (4, 7), bass programming (7, 9), synthesizer programming (9)
- Michael Fellows – drums (8)
- Kirk Whalum – saxophone (6)
- Cindy Mizelle – backing vocals (2, 4, 9)
- Wendy Moten – backing vocals (2, 4, 9)
- Chris Rodriguez – backing vocals (2, 4, 9)
- Athena Cage – backing vocals (4)
- Brent Carter – backing vocals (4, 7)
- Lisabell – backing vocals (10)
- Keith Brown – backing vocals (10)
- Eric Burnett – backing vocals (10)

Strings on "Didn't I (Blow Your Mind This Time)"

- Clare Fischer – arrangements and conductor
- Murray Adler, Ron Clark, Pamela Goldsmith, Morton Klafner, Donald Palmer, Morris Repass, Frederick Seykora and Francine Walsh – string players

== Production ==
- Mitchell Cohen – executive producer
- Brenda Dash – executive producer, management
- Todd Moore – production coordinator (2, 4, 7, 9)
- Josephine DiDonato – art direction, design
- Kip Meyer – photography
- Mervyn Dash – management
- Coast To Coast Mgmt, Inc. and Pipeline Entertainment – management companies

Technical credits

- Vlado Meller – mastering at Sony Music Studios (New York City, New York)
- Bill Whittington – recording (2, 4, 7, 9), mixing (2, 4, 7, 9)
- Ron Shaffer – recording (3, 6), mixing (3)
- Steve Counter – recording (5, 8, 10, 11)
- Ken Kessie – mixing (5, 8, 10, 11)
- Michael Tarsia – mixing (6)
- Pete Tokar – overdubbing (6)
- Leslie Ann Jones – string section recording (11)
- Mike Corbett – assistant engineer (2, 9)
- Greg Parker – assistant engineer (2, 4, 7)
- Eric Flickinger – assistant engineer (5, 8, 10, 11)
- Paul Foley – assistant engineer (5, 8, 10, 11)

== Charts ==
Chart (1995)	Peak position
US Billboard 200	152
US Top R&B/Hip-Hop Albums (Billboard)	18
