= Stay with Me (Regina Belle album) =

Studio album by Regina Belle
- Released: August 22, 1989
- Recorded: September 1988 – April 1989
- Studios: Tarpan (San Rafael, California); The Plant (Sausalito, California); The Hit Factory, Sigma and Soundtrack (New York City, New York); East Bay (Tarrytown, New York); Lahaina Sound (Lahaina, Maui)
- Genres: R&B; soul
- Length: 58:29
- Label: Columbia
- Producers: Narada Michael Walden; Walter Afanasieff; Nick Martinelli; Barry Eastmond

Regina Belle chronology
All by Myself (1987)	Stay with Me (1989)	Passion (1993)

Singles from Stay with Me
- 1. "Baby Come to Me" Released: October 2, 1989; 2. "Make It Like It Was" Released: March 17, 1990; 3. "What Goes Around" Released: April 28, 1990; 4. "This Is Love" Released: July 5, 1990

Professional ratings
Review scores
Source	Rating
AllMusic	4.5/5 stars
The Encyclopedia of Popular Music	3/5 stars

Stay with Me is the second album by American singer Regina Belle, released on August 22, 1989, by Columbia Records. It peaked at number 63 on the US Billboard 200 and number one on the Top R&B/Hip-Hop Albums chart. It includes the hit singles "All I Want Is Forever" (featuring James "J.T." Taylor), "Baby Come to Me" (an R&B No. 1), "Make It Like It Was" (another R&B No. 1) and "What Goes Around". "Good Lovin'" was released as a single in the UK, where it reached number 73 in the UK Singles Chart. The album was certified Gold by the RIAA on January 22, 1990.

== Track listing ==
Side 1
No.	Title	Writer(s)	Length
1.	"Baby Come to Me"	Jeffrey Cohen, Narada Michael Walden	5:42
2.	"When Will You Be Mine"	Eric Foster White	4:45
3.	"Dream Lover"	D. Kyles, Matthew Grady	5:31
4.	"What Goes Around"	Carolyn Mitchell	5:37
5.	"Make It Like It Was"	Carvin Winans	5:10
6.	"Good Lovin'"	Carl Bourelly, Roz Davis	5:46
7.	"It Doesn't Hurt Anymore"	Antonina Armato, Rick Neigher	5:03
8.	"This Is Love"	Jonathan Butler	4:45
9.	"(It's Gonna Take) All Our Love"	Barry Eastmond, Maria Eastmond	4:38
10.	"Someday We'll All Be Free / Save the Children"	Donny Hathaway, Edward Howard; Al Cleveland, Renaldo Benson, Marvin Gaye	6:57
11.	"All I Want Is Forever" (featuring James J.T. Taylor)	Diane Warren	4:31

== Personnel ==
- Regina Belle – vocals, backing vocals (6), percussion (10)
- Walter Afanasieff – keyboards (1, 2, 6, 11), bass (1, 2, 6, 11), drum programming (1, 2, 6, 11)
- Ren Klyce – Fairlight CMI (1, 2, 6, 11)
- Odeen Mays – keyboards (3)
- Donald Robinson – Rhodes electric piano (3, 7), acoustic piano (5)
- Randy Cantor – synthesizers (3, 7), keyboards (4)
- Curtis Dowd – keyboards (4), Rhodes electric piano (5)
- Barry Eastmond – keyboards (8, 9), drum programming (8, 9), bass (9)
- Eric Rehl – synthesizer programming (8)
- James K. Lloyd – acoustic piano (10), synthesizers (10)
- Randy Bowland – guitars (3–5, 7, 10)
- Joe Fusco – guitar solo (3)
- Vernon "Ice" Black – lead guitar (6), rhythm guitar (6)
- Billy "Spaceman" Patterson – guitars (8)
- Chris Camozzi – rhythm guitar (11), guitar solo (11)
- Doug Grigsby – bass (3, 4, 7, 10)
- Tom Barney – bass (8)
- Daryl Burgee – drums (3–5, 7)
- Buddy Williams – cymbals (8)
- Curtis Harmon – drums (10)
- Gigi Gonaway – cymbals (11)
- Mayra Caseles – percussion (3, 5, 7)
- Premik Russell Tubbs – saxophone solo (1)
- Bob Malach – saxophone solo (4)
- Michael Brecker – saxophone solo (8)
- Melvin Holder – saxophone solo (9)
- Clifford Adams – trombone (10)
- Emma Kummrow – concertmaster (5)
- Kitty Beethoven – backing vocals (1, 2, 11)
- Skyler Jett – backing vocals (1, 2, 11)
- Melisa Kary – backing vocals (1, 2, 6)
- Claytoven Richardson – backing vocals (1, 2)
- Cynthia Biggs – backing vocals (3, 4, 10)
- Annette Hardeman – backing vocals (3, 10)
- Charlene Holloway – backing vocals (3, 4, 10)
- Carolyn Mitchell – backing vocals (4)
- Yolanda Lee – backing vocals (8, 9)
- Cindy Mizelle – backing vocals (8, 9)
- Audrey Wheeler – backing vocals (8, 9)
- Bernard Belle – backing vocals (10)
- Lawrence Cottrell – backing vocals (10)
- Eric Williams – backing vocals (10)
- James "J.T." Taylor – vocals (11)

Music arrangements

- Walter Afanasieff – synthesizer arrangements (1)
- Narada Michael Walden – arrangements (1, 2, 6, 11)
- Jack Faith – string arrangements (5)
- Barry Eastmond – arrangements (8, 9)
- Bernard Belle – arrangements (10)
- Regina Belle – arrangements (10)
- Horace Alexander Young – arrangements (10)
- Ron Kerber – horn arrangements (10)

Production

- David Frazer – recording (1, 2, 6), mixing (1, 2, 6, 11), additional recording (11)
- Glenn Barratt – recording (3, 5, 7, 10), mixing (3, 5, 7, 10)
- Bruce Weeden – recording (4), mixing (4)
- Darroll Gustamachio – remixing (5), mix engineer (8, 9)
- Mike Allaire – recording (8, 9)
- Dana Jon Chappelle – assistant engineer (1, 2, 6, 11), recording (11)
- Adam Silverman – assistant engineer (3–5, 7, 10)
- John Sullivan – assistant engineer (3–5, 7, 10)
- Sal Viarellie – assistant engineer (3–5, 7, 10)
- Dave Russell – additional assistant engineer (1, 2, 6, 10)
- Tom Sadezeck – additional assistant engineer (1, 2, 6)
- Robert Smith – additional assistant engineer (1, 2, 6)
- Rich Travali – additional assistant engineer (1, 2, 6)
- Vlado Meller – mastering at CBS Studios (New York, NY)
- Josephine DiDonato – art direction
- Robert Cohen – photography
- Mark Daniels – hair stylist
- David Carrington – make-up

== Charts ==
=== Weekly charts ===
Chart (1989)	Peak position
UK Albums (Official Charts)	62
US Billboard 200	63
US Top R&B/Hip-Hop Albums (Billboard)	1

=== Year-end charts ===
Chart (1989)	Position
US Top R&B/Hip-Hop Albums (Billboard)	87
Chart (1990)	Position
US Top R&B/Hip-Hop Albums (Billboard)	5

== Certifications ==
Region	Certification	Certified units/sales
United States (RIAA)	Gold	500,000^{^}
^{^} Shipments figures based on certification alone.

== See also ==
- List of number-one R&B albums of 1989 (U.S.)
