= Shawn McLemore =

American gospel musician (1967–2021)

- Born: Shawn Lamont McLemore; May 3, 1967; Los Angeles, California, U.S.
- Origin: Los Angeles, California
- Died: October 9, 2021 (aged 54) Houston, Texas, U.S.
- Genres: Gospel, traditional black gospel, urban contemporary gospel
- Occupations: Singer, songwriter
- Instruments: Vocals, singer-songwriter, guitar, organ
- Years active: 1997–2021
- Labels: Verity, Worldwide, Black Smoke
- Formerly of: New Image
- Website: shawnmclemore.com

Shawn Lamont McLemore (May 3, 1967 – October 9, 2021) was an American gospel musician and leader of New Image. He started his music career in 1997 with the release of Wait on Him by Verity Records, and this placed on the Billboard magazine Gospel Albums chart. His second album, Sunday Morning: The Live Experience, came out in 2007 with Worldwide Music, yet this did not chart. The third album, Stand: The Shawn Mac Project, released in 2010 by Black Smoke Music alongside Worldwide Music, and this album did not chart. His fourth album, One Percent Miracle: Any Minute Now, was released in 2011 with Black Smoke Music along with Worldwide Music.

== Early life ==
McLemore was born on May 3, 1967, in Los Angeles, California, as Shawn Lamont McLemore. He was reared in the church as a child.

== Music career ==
McLemore's music recording career began in 1997 with the release of Wait on Him by Verity Records. The album reached no. 33 on the Billboard magazine Gospel Albums chart. His three subsequent albums failed to chart.

== Illness and death ==
McLemore died October 9, 2021, after a brief illness. He was 54. He is survived by his wife and a daughter.

== Album discography ==
- Wait On Him (Verity, 1997)
- Sunday Morning: The Live Experience (Worldwide Music, 2007)
- Stand: The Shawn Mac Project (Black Smoke/Worldwide Music, 2010)
- One Percent Miracle: Any Minute Now (Black Smoke/Worldwide Music, 2011)
