= Baby Come to Me (Regina Belle song) =

- Side-A label of U.S. vinyl single

Single by Regina Belle

from the album Stay with Me
- Released: October 2, 1989
- Recorded: April 1989
- Genre: R&B; soul
- Label: Columbia
- Songwriters: Narada Michael Walden; Jeffrey Cohen
- Producers: Narada Michael Walden; Walter Afanasieff (co.)

Regina Belle singles chronology
"All I Want Is Forever" (1989)	"Baby Come to Me" (1989)	"Good Lovin'" (1989)

"Baby Come to Me" is a 1989 R&B/Soul single by American singer Regina Belle. Released on October 2, 1989 on Columbia Records, The song was written by Narada Michael Walden and Jeffrey Cohen and produced by Narada Michael Walden. This song is from Belle's sophomore album Stay with Me.

== Background ==
The single was Regina Belle's first number one on the Hot Soul Singles chart, as well as the singer's third entry onto the Hot 100, where "Baby Come to Me" peaked at number 60. This song was certified gold by the RIAA on January 8, 1990. Belle performed the song at the 1990 Soul Train Music Awards, where it was also nominated for Best R&B/Urban Contemporary Single, Female.

== Charts ==
=== Weekly charts ===
Chart (1989)	Peak position
US Billboard Hot 100	60
US Hot R&B/Hip-Hop Songs (Billboard)	1

=== Year-end charts ===
Chart (1989)	Position
US Hot R&B/Hip-Hop Songs (Billboard)	7
