= Regina Belle =

American singer-songwriter

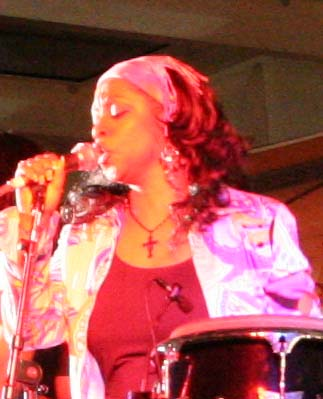
- Belle in concert on ms Westerdam, 2008
- Born: July 17, 1963 (age 63); Englewood, New Jersey, U.S.
- Education: Rutgers University
- Occupation: Singer-songwriter
- Years active: 1982–present
- Spouse(s): Horace Alexander Young (m. 1985; div. 1990) John Battle (m. 1991)
- Children: 5
- Relatives: Bernard Belle (brother)
- Musical career
- Genres: R&B; soul; pop; dance; gospel
- Instrument: Vocals
- Labels: Columbia; MCA; Peak; Concord; Pendulum; W.D.E.

Regina Belle (born July 17, 1963) is an American singer-songwriter who started her career in the mid-1980s. Known for her singles "Baby Come to Me" (1989) and "Make It Like It Was" (1990), Belle is most notable for three hit duets, all with Peabo Bryson: "Without You", the love theme from the comedy film Leonard Part 6, recorded in 1987; "A Whole New World", the main theme of the Disney's animated feature film Aladdin recorded in 1992, with which Belle and Bryson won a Grammy Award; and "I Just Can't Imagine". The theme song "Far Longer than Forever" from the animated movie The Swan Princess, performed with Jeffrey Osborne, was nominated for a Golden Globe in 1995 for Best Original Song.

== Biography ==
=== Early life and education ===
Belle was born in Englewood, New Jersey. It was at Englewood's Mount Calvary Baptist Church, and then Paterson's Friendship Baptist Church (presided over by Belle's uncle, the Reverend Fred Belle), that Belle began attracting attention with her vocal abilities. She sang her first solo in church at the age of eight. She attended Dwight Morrow High School, where she studied trombone, tuba, and steel drums. After graduation, Belle studied opera at the Manhattan School of Music. She attended Rutgers University and became the first female vocalist with the school's jazz ensemble. Belle's musical influences include Phyllis Hyman, Billie Holiday, Shirley Caesar, Patti LaBelle, and Nancy Wilson. She was introduced to the Manhattans by New York radio DJ Vaughn Harper and began working as their opening act. She recorded the duet "Where Did We Go Wrong" with the group on their Back to Basics album, which helped to attract the attention of Columbia Records. She recorded a second duet, "Maybe Tomorrow", which appeared on the B-side of "Where Did We Go Wrong". Columbia eventually signed her to a record deal.

=== Career ===
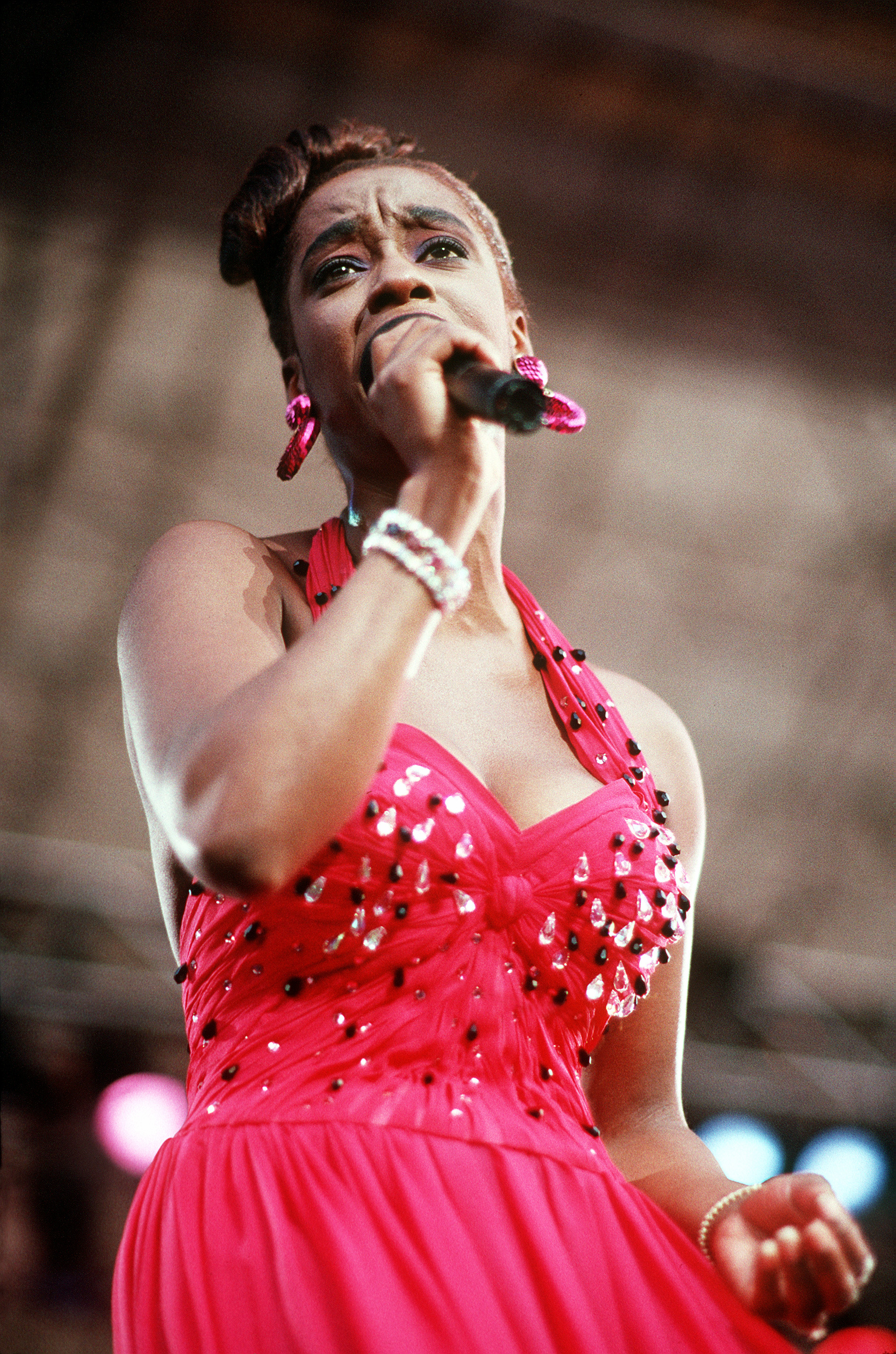
Regina Belle in 1991

In 1987, she released her debut album, All by Myself. It includes her first hits "So Many Tears" and "Show Me the Way". The same year, Belle recorded her first successful duet with Peabo Bryson: the song "Without You", the love theme from the comedy film Leonard Part 6, also released in 1987. The song was her first single to appear on the Adult Contemporary chart, peaking at #8 and was also her first single to appear in four charts, including the UK Singles, peaking at #85, her best position in this chart until 1989. Her follow-up album, Stay with Me, released in 1989. Belle recorded a duet in 1991 with Johnny Mathis, "Better Together", which appeared on his album Better Together: The Duet Album. Continuing her tradition of duets, Belle teamed up with Peabo Bryson for four songs: "Without You" (in 1987), "I Can't Imagine" (in 1991), "A Whole New World" (in 1992) and "Total Praise" (in 2009).

Later in 1993, she released her platinum-selling third album, Passion. The album featured the Disney hit "A Whole New World". The theme song "Far Longer than Forever" from the animated movie The Swan Princess, performed with Jeffrey Osborne, was nominated for a Golden Globe in 1995 for Best Original Song. She released Reachin' Back in 1995 followed by Believe in Me in 1998.

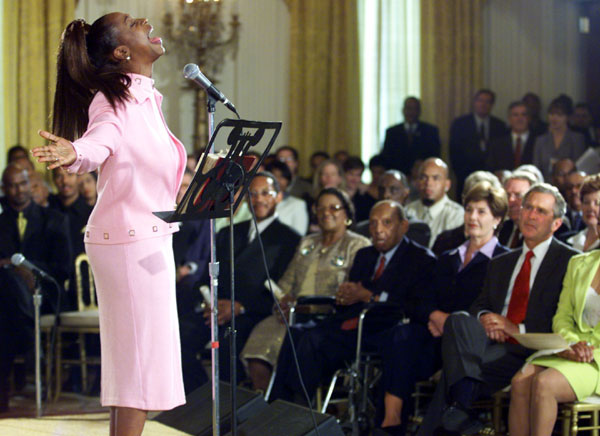
Belle performing for President George W. Bush and First Lady Laura Bush during a Black Music Month celebration in the East Room of the White House on June 30, 2001

In 2001, her cover of "Just the Two of Us" from the tribute album To Grover, With Love made a surprising return to the Billboard charts. Within months Belle would sign with the jazz-oriented independent label Peak-Concord Jazz. She released the album This Is Regina!, which featured the R&B hit single "Ooh Boy", and also released were "Don't Wanna Go Home" and "From Now On" with Glenn Jones. In 2004, she released a jazz standard album, Lazy Afternoon, produced by George Duke. The album included covers of the Isley Brothers' "For the Love of You" and Tony Bennett's "If I Ruled the World". In 2007, she collaborated with smooth jazz saxophonist Paul Taylor, co-writing and singing on his album Ladies Choice. Belle released her debut gospel album, Love Forever Shines, on May 13, 2008, via Pendulum Records. The 14-track collection features guests Melvin Williams (of the Williams Brothers) and Shirley Murdock. On June 5, 2012, Belle released on Pendulum her second gospel album, called Higher, on which she stated: "I think that, with the second CD [Higher] I had a better understanding of where I wanted to go [compared to Love Forever Shines]". Belle has appeared in concert with many other performers, including Ray Charles, Boney James, Paul Taylor, The Rippingtons, Gerald Albright, Will Downing, Maze, Frankie Beverly, Phil Perry, Al Jarreau, and Stephanie Mills.

== Personal life ==
Belle has been married twice. Her first marriage was to saxophonist and flute player Horace Alexander Young from 1985 until 1990, and together they adopted a daughter named Tiy (born 1989). Belle married former NBA basketball player John Battle on June 25, 1991. Belle and her husband reside in Atlanta, Georgia. John is a pastor of a church in Atlanta.

The couple has four children together, two of whom are adopted: daughter Winter, and son Jayln. After suffering miscarriages of two sets of twin boys, the couple had daughter Sydni (born 1994) and Nyla (born November 10, 1995). Belle has two grandchildren from Winter, Thea and Joshua.

Belle successfully battled a brain tumor in 2009. However, she is now deaf in her left ear.

== Discography ==
=== Studio albums ===
Year	Album	Chart positions					Certifications	Record label
Year	Album	US	US R&B	US Jazz	US Gospel	UK	Certifications	Record label
1987	All by Myself	85	14	—	—	53		Columbia
1989	Stay with Me	63	1	—	—	62	US: Gold	Columbia
1993	Passion	63	13	—	—	—	US: Gold	Columbia
1995	Reachin' Back	115	18	—	—	—		Columbia
1998	Believe in Me	—	42	—	—	—		MCA
2001	This Is Regina!	—	61	—	—	—		Peak
2004	Lazy Afternoon	—	58	12	—	—		Peak
2008	Love Forever Shines	119	15	—	3	—		Pendulum
2012	Higher	—	44	—	15	—		Pendulum
2016	The Day Life Began	—	—	—	11	—		Shanachie
"—" denotes the album failed to chart.

=== Compilations ===
- 1997: Baby Come to Me: The Best of Regina Belle
- 2001: Super Hits
- 2006: Love Songs

=== Singles ===
Year	Single	Chart positions					
Year	Single	US	US R&B	US A/C	US Dance	US Gospel	UK
1986	"Where Did We Go Wrong?" (with The Manhattans)	—	42	—	—	—	—
1987	"Show Me the Way"	68	2	—	—	—	97
1987	"So Many Tears"	—	11	—	—	—	—
1987	"Without You" (with Peabo Bryson)	89	14	8	—	—	85
1988	"How Could You Do It to Me"	—	21	—	—	—	—
1988	"After the Love Has Lost Its Shine"	—	—	—	—	—	—
1988	"You Got the Love"	—	—	—	—	—	103
1989	"All I Want Is Forever" (with James "J.T." Taylor)	—	2	34	—	—	144
1989	"Baby Come to Me"	60	1	—	—	—	127
1989	"Good Lovin'"	—	—	—	—	—	73
1989	"Make It Like It Was"	43	1	5	—	—	—
1990	"What Goes Around"	—	3	—	—	—	—
1990	"This Is Love"	—	7	29	—	—	—
1992	"Better Together" (with Johnny Mathis)	—	68	—	—	—	—
1992	"A Whole New World (Aladdin's Theme)" (with Peabo Bryson)	1	21	1	—	—	12
1993	"If I Could"	52	9	12	—	—	—
1993	"Quiet Time"	—	47	—	—	—	—
1993	"Dream in Color"	—	63	—	—	—	—
1993	"The Deeper I Love"	—	—	—	—	—	—
1994	"Far Longer than Forever" (with Jeffrey Osborne)	—	—	—	—	—	—
1995	"Love T.K.O."	—	29	—	—	—	—
1998	"Don't Let Go"	—	—	—	—	—	—
1998	"I've Had Enough"	—	—	—	—	—	—
2001	"Oooh Boy"	—	63	—	—	—	—
2004	"For the Love of You"	—	—	—	—	—	—
2008	"God Is Good"	—	83	—	—	2	—
2008	"I Call on Jesus"	—	—	—	—	17	—
2012	"Make an Example Out of Me"	—	—	—	—	19	—
"—" denotes the single failed to chart.

== Awards and nominations ==
- American Music Award
  - 1991, Favorite Soul/R&B Female Artist (Nominated)
- Grammy Award

Year	Nominee / work	Award	Result
1991	"Make It Like It Was"	Best Female R&B Vocal Performance	Nominated
1994	"A Whole New World" (with Peabo Bryson)	Record of the Year	Nominated
1994	"A Whole New World" (with Peabo Bryson)	Best Pop Performance by a Duo or Group with Vocals	Won
1999	Believe in Me	Best Traditional R&B Vocal Album	Nominated
2002	This is Regina	Best Traditional R&B Vocal Album	Nominated

- MTV Movie Awards
  - 1993, Best Song From a Movie: "A Whole New World" (with Peabo Bryson) (Nominated)
- Rhythm and Blues Hall of Fame
  - Herself (thirteenth class)

== See also ==
- List of number-one hits (United States)
- List of artists who reached number one on the Hot 100
