= Kool Keith discography =

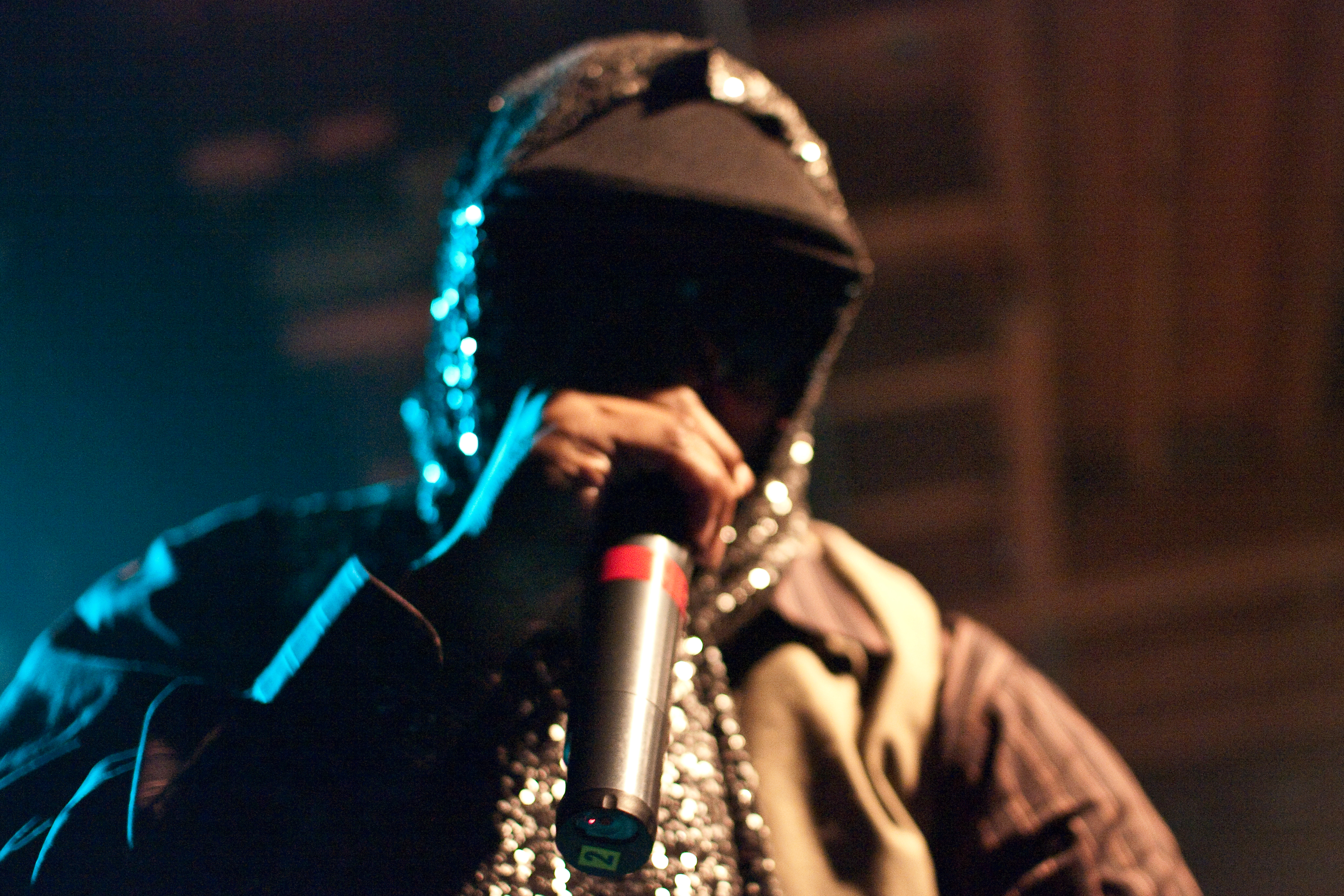
- Kool Keith performing at Mezzanine in San Francisco, California during the 2009 Noise Pop Festival.
- Studio albums: 47
- Extended plays: 2
- Live albums: 1
- Compilation albums: 6
- Singles: 16
- Mixtapes: 4

The discography of American rapper Kool Keith consists of 47 studio albums, of which 24 were solo projects, and 23 albums in collaboration with other artists. His most recent studio album, Karpenters, was released in 2025. Kool Keith has collaborated with TomC3, 54–71, Denis Deft, Big Sche Eastwood, L'Orange, Ray West, Thetan, Real Bad Man, and was in the groups Ultramagnetic MCs, The Cenobites, Ultra, Analog Brothers, Masters of Illusion, KHM/Clayborne Family, Thee Undatakerz, The Diesel Truckers.

== Studio albums ==
=== Solo albums ===
| Year | Title | Peak chart positions | | | | Notes |
| Year | Title | US | US R&B | US Heat. | US Indie | Notes |
|---|---|---|---|---|---|---|
| 1996 | Dr. Octagonecologyst: Label: Bulk/DreamWorks | — | — | — | — | Debut solo album.; Credited as Dr. Octagon. |
| 1997 | Sex Style: Label: Funky Ass | — | — | — | — | |
| 1999 | First Come, First Served: Label: Funky Ass | — | — | 48 | — | Credited as Dr. Dooom. |
| 1999 | Black Elvis/Lost in Space: Label: Ruffhouse/Columbia | 180 | 74 | 10 | — | |
| 2000 | Matthew: Label: Funky Ass | — | — | 47 | 36 | |
| 2001 | Spankmaster: Label: Overcore/TVT | — | 48 | 16 | 11 | |
| 2006 | Nogatco Rd.: Label: Insomniac | — | — | — | — | Credited as Mr. Nogatco. |
| 2006 | The Return of Dr. Octagon: Label: OCD | — | — | — | — | Credited as Dr. Octagon. |
| 2008 | Dr. Dooom 2: Label: Threshold | — | — | — | — | Credited as Dr. Dooom. |
| 2009 | Tashan Dorrsett: Label: Junkadelic | — | — | — | — | |
| 2012 | Love and Danger: Label: Junkadelic | — | — | — | — | |
| 2014 | Demolition Crash: Label: Junkadelic | — | — | — | — | Credited as Number One Producer. |
| 2014 | Teddy Bass Presents El Dorado Driven: Label: Volunteer Media | — | — | — | — | Recorded with Teddy Bass. |
| 2016 | Feature Magnetic: Label: Mello Music Group | — | — | — | — | Credited as Number One Producer. |
| 2018 | Moosebumps: An Exploration Into Modern Day Horripilation: Label: Bulk/Caroline | — | — | 1 | 8 | Credited as Dr. Octagon. |
| 2018 | Controller of Trap: Label: Ocean Ave Records | — | — | — | — | |
| 2019 | Keith: Label: Mello Music Group | — | — | — | — | |
| 2019 | Computer Technology: Label: Junkadelic | — | — | — | — | |
| 2020 | Saks 5th Ave: Label: Volunteer Media | — | — | — | — | |
| 2021 | Keith's Salon: Label: Logistic Records | — | — | — | — | |
| 2023 | Black Elvis 2: Label: Mello Music Group | — | — | — | — | |
| 2023 | Mr. Controller: Label: Junkadelic Music | — | — | — | — | |
| 2023 | World Area: Label: Ocean Ave Records | — | — | — | — | |
| 2025 | Karpenters: Label: Post Up Music/Fat Beats Records | — | — | — | — | |

=== Collaboration albums ===
| Year | Title | Peak chart positions | | | | Notes |
| Year | Title | US | US R&B | US Heat. | US Indie | Notes |
|---|---|---|---|---|---|---|
| 1988 | Critical Beatdown: Label: Next Plateau | — | 57 | — | — | Recorded with Ced-Gee, TR Love and Moe Love, as Ultramagnetic MCs. |
| 1992 | Funk Your Head Up: Label: Mercury/PolyGram | — | — | — | — | Recorded with Ced-Gee, TR Love and Moe Love, as Ultramagnetic MCs. |
| 1993 | The Four Horsemen: Label: Wild Pitch/EMI Records | — | 55 | 15 | — | Recorded with Ced-Gee, TR Love and Moe Love, as Ultramagnetic MCs. |
| 1996 | Big Time: Label: Our Turn | — | — | — | — | Recorded with Tim Dog, as Ultra. |
| 1997 | Cenobites LP: Label: Fondle 'Em | — | — | — | — | Recorded with Godfather Don, as The Cenobites. |
| 2000 | Pimp to Eat: Label: Ground Control | — | — | — | — | Recorded with Ice-T, Pimpin' Rex, Black Silver and Marc Live, as Analog Brothers.; Credited as Keith Korg. |
| 2000 | Masters of Illusion: Label: Threshold | — | — | — | — | Recorded with KutMasta Kurt and Motion Man, as Masters of Illusion. |
| 2002 | Game: Label: Number 6 | — | 42 | 26 | 33 | Recorded with H-Bomb a.k.a. Jacky Jasper and Marc Live, as KHM. |
| 2004 | Kool Keith Presents Thee Undatakerz: Label: Activate Entertainment | — | — | — | — | Recorded with Al Bury-U, M-Balmer and The Funeral Director, as Thee Undatakerz.; Credited as Reverend Tom. |
| 2004 | Diesel Truckers: Label: DMAFT | — | — | — | — | Recorded with KutMasta Kurt, as The Diesel Truckers.; Credited as Platinum Rich. |
| 2004 | Clayborne Family: Label: Threshold | — | — | — | — | Recorded with H-Bomb a.k.a. Jacky Jasper and Marc Live, as Clayborne Family. |
| 2006 | Nogatco Rd.: Label: Insomniac | — | — | — | — | Credited as Mr. Nogatco. |
| 2006 | The Original SoundTrack Album of Project Polaroid: Label: Threshold | — | — | — | — | Recorded with TomC3, as Project Polaroid. |
| 2007 | The Best Kept Secret: Label: DMAFT | — | — | — | — | Recorded with Ced-Gee and Moe Love, as Ultramagnetic MCs.; Credited as Underwear Pissy. |
| 2009 | Idea of a Master Piece: Label: Contrarede | — | — | — | — | Recorded with 54–71. |
| 2009 | Bikinis N Thongs: Label: RBC Records | — | — | — | — | Recorded with Denis Deft and Yeti Beats. |
| 2013 | Magnetic Pimp Force Field: Label: Junkadelic | — | — | — | — | Recorded with Big Sche Eastwood. |
| 2015 | Time? Astonishing!: Label: Mello Music Group | — | — | — | — | Recorded with L'Orange. |
| 2015 | A Couples of Slices: Label: Red Apples 45 | — | — | — | — | Recorded with Ray West. |
| 2020 | Space Goretex: Label: Anti-Corp | — | — | — | — | Recorded with Thetan. |
| 2022 | Subatomic: Label: Threshold Records | — | — | — | — | Recorded with Del the Funky Homosapien, as FNKPMPN. |
| 2023 | Serpent: Label: Real Bad Man Records | — | — | — | — | Recorded with Real Bad Man |
| 2024 | Everybody Eats!: Label: Silver Age Records | — | — | — | — | Recorded with Czarface, as Stress Eaters |

== Self-released albums ==
| Year | Title | Notes |
|---|---|---|
| 2004 | The Personal Album: Label: Kool Keith Enterprises | Limited to 1000 copies. |
| 2006 | The Commi$$ioner: Label: — | Limited to 500 copies. |
| 2006 | The Commi$$ioner 2: Label: Threshold | Limited to 1100 copies. |

== Compilations, EPs and remix albums ==
| Year | Title | Notes |
|---|---|---|
| 2003 | The Lost Masters: Label: Dmaft | |
| 2004 | White Label Mix Series, Vol. 1: Label: Gamelock | Recorded with Nancy Des Rose. |
| 2004 | Kool Keith Official Space Tape: Label: Junkadelic | Remixed by DJ Junkaz Lou |
| 2005 | The Lost Masters, Vol. 2: Label: Dmaft | |
| 2006 | Collabs Tape: Label: Junkadelic | Consists entirely of guest appearances from other artists' albums. |
| 2006 | Down On Land: Label: Sickbay/L.A. Hill | Recorded with Randolf Liftoff. |
| 2007 | Sex Style: The Un-Released Archives: Label: Threshold | Recorded with KutMasta Kurt. |
| 2011 | The Legend of Tashan Dorrsett: Label: Junkadelic | Credited as Tashan Dorrsett. |
| 2011 | The Doctor Is In: Label: — | Recorded with Paul Sea. |
| 2016 | The Preacher: Label: Junkadelic | Credited as Tashan Dorrsett. |
| 2018 | Moosebumps: An Exploration Into Modern Day Horripilation The SP 1200 Remixes: Label: Bulk Recordings | Remixed by Dan The Automator. |

== Live albums ==
| Year | Title | Notes |
|---|---|---|
| 2007 | In High Definition: Label: 2B1 | |

== Mixtapes ==
| Year | Title | Notes |
|---|---|---|
| 2013 | Total Orgasm: Label: — | |
| 2013 | Total Orgasm 2: Label: — | |
| 2013 | Total Orgasm 3: Label: — | |
| 2016 | Total Orgasm 4: Label: Junkadelic | |
| 2018 | Total Orgasm 5: Label: Junkadelic | |
| 2021 | Total Orgasm 6 (Part 1, 2 and 3): Label: Junkadelic | |

== Singles ==
| Year | Title | Album |
|---|---|---|
| 1996 | "No Awareness" | Dr. Octagonecologyst |
| 1996 | "Blue Flowers" | Dr. Octagonecologyst |
| 1996 | "3000" | Dr. Octagonecologyst |
| 1997 | "Plastic World" | Sex Style |
| 1999 | "Livin' Astro" | Black Elvis/Lost in Space |
| 2000 | "Earth People" | Dr. Octagonecologyst |
| 2000 | "I Don't Believe You" | Matthew |
| 2002 | "Keith 'N' Me" | Princess Superstar Is |
| 2003 | "Freaks" | The Lost Masters |
| 2003 | "Don't Crush It" | Sex Style |
| 2004 | "Break U Off/Takin' It Back" | Diesel Truckers |
| 2005 | "Varoom" | Lost Masters Volume 2 |
| 2006 | "Trees" | The Return of Dr. Octagon |
| 2006 | "Aliens" | The Return of Dr. Octagon |
| 2006 | "Gorilla Driving a Pickup Truck" | The Return of Dr. Octagon |
| 2008 | "Booty Clap" | Tashan Dorrsett |
| 2013 | "Spaz" (With Del Tha Funkee Homosapien as Dr. OctoTron) | |
| 2019 | "Zero Fux" (featuring B-Real) | Keith |
| 2019 | "Turn the Levels" | Keith |

== Guest appearances ==
List of non-single guest appearances, with other performing artists, showing year released and album name
| Title | Year | Other artist(s) | Album |
|---|---|---|---|
| "I Ain't Havin' It" | 1991 | Tim Dog | Penicillin on Wax |
| "Secret Fantasies" | 1991 | Tim Dog | Penicillin on Wax |
| "Rampage / Outta Control" | 1993 | Raw Breed, Grandmaster Melle Mel | Open Season |
| "Young Ladies" | 1995 | Guru (rapper), Patra (singer), Big Shug | Guru's Jazzmatazz, Vol. 2: The New Reality |
| "The Shabba-Doo Conspiracy" | 1996 | Chino XL | Here to Save You All |
| "In the Wee Wee Time" | 1997 | Natural Calamity | On the Peach (Peach Head Remix) 12" |
| "Diesel Power" | 1997 | The Prodigy | The Fat of the Land |
| "So Intelligent" | 1997 | Sir Menelik | Soundbombing |
| "Camp Chestnut" | 1997 | Spazz | La Revancha |
| "Object Unknown" | 1998 | DJ Spooky, Scaramonga | Riddim Warfare |
| "Riddim Warfare" | 1998 | DJ Spooky | Riddim Warfare |
| "Voices" | 1998 | Godfather Don | Diabolique |
| "Intro" | 1998 | Sir Menelik | Lyricist Lounge, Volume One |
| "Weapon World" | 1999 | Prince Paul | A Prince Among Thieves |
| "Conspiracies" | 1999 | Material, Kutmaster Kurt | Intonarumori |
| "Hands on Experience Pt II" | 1999 | The High & Mighty, Bobbito, Jean Grae | Home Field Advantage (album) |
| "Ego Trippin' 99" | 1999 | Sway & King Tech, Motion Man | This or That |
| "Get Off My Elevator!!" | 1999 | —N/a | Defenders of the Underworld |
| "Bow to the Masta" | 1999 | —N/a | Celebrity Deathmatch (soundtrack) |
| "Wreck [Mankind Theme]" | 2000 | Ol' Dirty Bastard | WWF Aggression |
| "Omegaton" | 2000 | Blood of Abraham | eyedollartree |
| "You Can't See" | 2000 | Groove Terminator | Road Kill |
| "Keith N' Me" | 2001 | Princess Superstar | Princess Superstar Is |
| "Stank MCs" | 2001 | Smut Peddlers | Porn Again |
| "Brother Keith on Destructor Mountain (4001)" | 2001 | Gerling | When Young... |
| "Devilshit" | 2001 | Esham | Tongues |
| "All Night Everyday" | 2001 | Esham | Tongues |
| "Interlude (Freestyle)" | 2001 | —N/a | Farewell Fondle ''Em |
| "Know MY Name" | 2002 | —N/a | Clockstoppers |
| "Thug or What?" | 2002 | —N/a | Eastern Conference All Stars 2 |
| "DDT" | 2002 | Jurassic 5 | Power in Numbers |
| "That" | 2003 | Teddy Bass | Sonic Outrage |
| "Doper Skiller" | 2004 | Viktor Vaughn | Venomous Villain: 2 |
| "Party in the Morgue - Club Mix" | 2004 | Thee Undertakaz | Blade: Trinity (soundtrack) |
| "Wake Up Call" | 2004 | The Prodigy, Louise Boone | Always Outnumbered, Never Outgunned |
| "You'll Be Under My Wheels" | 2004 | The Prodigy | Always Outnumbered, Never Outgunned |
| "Getaway" | 2006 | Peeping Tom | Peeping Tom |
| "Daisycutta" | 2006 | 7L & Esoteric | A New Dope |
| "Spacious Thoughts" | 2009 | N.A.S.A., Tom Waits | The Spirit of Apollo |
| "Put Your Nylons On" | 2010 | Extra Kool, Time | The Chronicles Of An American Waster (Even's Dead) |
| "Space Weapons" | 2011 | Ice Warriors | Ice Warriors EP |
| "Crab Hand" | 2013 | CRUDBUMP | The Judas Beats Album |
| "Journey" | 2013 | U-God | The Keynote Speaker |
| "Brainworms" | 2013 | Dope D.O.D. | Da Roach |
| "Metaphor 6000" | 2014 | Nu:Tone | Future History |
| "Pumpkinhead" | 2014 | Figure | Monsters, Vol. 5 |
| "The Dip" | 2015 | MC Lars | The Zombie Dinosaur LP |
| "Sword in the Stone" | 2016 | Banks & Steelz | Anything But Words |
| "Make Your Arrangements" | 2016 | Craig G | I Rap and Go Home |
| "Unity" | 2018 | Smash Mouth, DMC | — |
| "Fearless and Inventive" | 2022 | Czarface | Czarmageddon! |
| "Keith Meets Dike" | 2023 | Dirty Dike | Mattress |
| "Divinity 2 Infinity: Odyssey" | 2023 | DJ Muggs | Divinity OST |
| "Strike! Emergency Hearts Mix" | 2024 | Scott Crow, Ceschi, Xiu Xiu | Strike! |
| "Strike! Mark Pistel Mix" | 2024 | Scott Crow, Ceschi, Xiu Xiu | Strike! |
| "Strike! AwareNess Remix" | 2024 | Scott Crow, Ceschi, Xiu Xiu | Strike! |
| "Stars Align" | 2024 | Your Best Friend Jippy, Tha God Fahim, Lord Apex | Unidentified Friendly Object |
| "Electric Mind" | 2024 | The Polish Ambassador | SUper Chill Goats, Vol. 1 and 2 |
| "Back By Popular Demand" | 2025 | Grand Puba | The Origin (The Retirement Package, Vol. 1) |
