= The Return of Dr. Octagon =

Studio album by Dr. Octagon
- Released: June 27, 2006
- Genre: Alternative hip-hop; underground hip-hop
- Length: 34:15
- Label: OCD International
- Producer: One-Watt Sun

Kool Keith chronology
Project Polaroid (2006)	The Return of Dr. Octagon (2006)	Dr. Dooom 2 (2008)

Singles from The Return of Dr. Octagon
- 1. "Aliens" Released: July 3, 2006; 2. "Trees" Released: 2006; 3. "Gorilla Driving A Pick-Up Truck" Released: 2006

The Return of Dr. Octagon is the eighth solo studio album by American rapper Kool Keith (Keith Matthew Thornton), and his second release under the 'Dr. Octagon' alias, following Dr. Octagonecologyst. It was released on June 27, 2006, on OCD International in the United States. The album revives the character of Dr. Octagon, who was killed off on Thornton's 1999 release First Come, First Served. Production for the album began in 2002 under the title The Resurrection of Dr. Octagon with producer Fanatik J.

Thornton signed a contract with CMH Records to release the album. Following a contractual dispute, Fanatik J was released from the project. The album's production was completed by the One-Watt Sun production team based upon three completed vocal recordings and older unfinished recordings. Thornton had little involvement with the production of the album. He later stated that he liked the completed product, but that it hurt his musical reputation.

The Return of Dr. Octagon initially received great reviews. The first single "Aliens" garnered the coveted The Guardian's Single of the Week in the U.K., and also was given a place among The Wire magazine's top hip-hop records of the year, but what followed were much more polarized reviews. The album did not chart. Much praise and criticism centered on the production, with HipHopDX stating "This is Kool Keith's best album in years—arguably even better than his classic Octagonecologyst," and Newsweek stating that "If this album surpasses its predecessor, full credit goes to the Berlin production trio One Watt Sun, who come off sounding like a cross between Parliament-Funkadelic and Kraftwerk." Yet others felt that the production fit neither Thornton's lyrical style nor the Dr. Octagon character. Thornton revived the character for the albums Moosebumps: An Exploration Into Modern Day Horripilation and Space Goretex.

== Origins and recording ==
Keith Thornton, best known by the stage name Kool Keith, released the album Dr. Octagonecologyst in 1996, under the name Dr. Octagon, produced by Dan "The Automator" Nakamura. Thornton later expressed some frustration with the "Dr. Octagon" nickname, saying, "Octagon wasn't my life...I've done a lot of things that were totally around different things other than Octagon. Are some people just afraid to venture off into my life and see that I do other things which are great? I think people stuck me with something." In 1999, Thornton released the album First Come, First Served, which featured a track in which the newly introduced character Dr. Dooom murdered Dr. Octagon. Thornton had intended to move away from the Dr. Octagon character, but later decided to record another album under the Octagon name.

In 2002, Thornton announced The Resurrection of Dr. Octagon, a proposed sequel to Dr. Octagonecologyst that would reintroduce the character. Los Angeles-based producer Fanatik J was chosen to create the music for the album. Thornton himself took part in the production of early material for the project, playing bass, guitar, and keyboards on many of the tracks.

Thornton signed a contract with CMH Records to release the album. On July 23, 2002, Rolling Stone reported that a new Dr. Octagon album would be released in February 2003. Explaining his choice of label, Thornton said, "I chose to go with somebody that [would] take this as a creative project, not a marketing project. Major labels tend to let inexperienced people oversee your projects. Your innovation goes down because they have [too much] input. You don't see anybody going into the studio to tell James Brown what to do. Even though he can adapt to certain things, nobody tells him how to sing. That's the way I feel about myself."

Preceding the production of the album, Thornton told Rolling Stone that "this album is fine-tuned with instruments, deeper and more spaced out. The last one was cool, but I didn't like it because it wasn't funky. When I don't work on a project, it's not that funky. When I do work on it, it's funky, and it has soul to it...I'm proud of my funky sounds right now." Fanatik J was not named as the album's producer. Thornton stated that with Dr. Octagonecologyst, Thornton had given Nakamura his first successful album as a producer, and that with The Return of Dr. Octagon, he would "make another person and create another star".

As production on the album was underway, Thornton had a falling out with Fanatik J over contract rights. Thornton referred to Fanatik J as "greedy" and stated that "He went out of his level of producer's ranking. Maybe he thought he was an overnight Quincy Jones, that he was the Automator." Fanatik J later engaged in a legal battle with CMH over contractual terms that did not give him input on remixes.

Following Fanatik J's disputes with the label, CMH contacted San Francisco-based producer John Lindland and Melbourne-based producers Simon Walbrook and Ben Green to produce material for the album. Lindland, Walbrook and Green began creating material for the album under the billing of One-Watt Sun. Thornton was briefly involved with the project, recording vocals for three tracks: "Trees," "Ants," and "Aliens," based upon rough sonic and lyrical themes created by the production team. After Thornton had a falling out with the label over contractual terms, he gave the label recordings he had made two years previously, consisting of Thornton rapping and goofing off, in order to complete his contract. The album was completed without his involvement.

== Music ==
=== Production ===
One-Watt Sun met at various points in Berlin, Prague, Melbourne, and Byron Bay to work on the album's music tracks with Pro Tools software. The music and structure of the vocal recordings were completed the following year. None of Fanatik J's production work appeared on the final album. According to Allmusic reviewer Marisa Brown, One-Watt Sun's production incorporates elements of "pop, dirty blues, rock, and R&B".

Some critics felt that the album's production was inferior to that of Dr. Octagonecologyst. KutMasta Kurt, a frequent collaborator with Thornton, disliked the album's production, stating "The Dr. Octagon character was rapping over sounds that were dark and sinister, but they turned the album into this dancey electro-pop. A lot of it had this Euro-dance feel, and I was like, 'Wait a second, not only did they change the music, they changed it into something [to which] I couldn't relate.'" KutMasta Kurt also recounts a conversation with Thornton on a European flight in December 2006, in which Thornton stated that The Return of Dr. Octagon does not sound like a Dr. Octagon album. Thornton himself said that he liked the album's production, but that the album hurt his reputation as a musician. According to Thornton, "I'm not mad. But I don't repeat words when I rap. They cooked up some electronic stuff, you know, WORD! WORD! WORD! making me sound like triple people. It's interesting."

=== Storyline and lyrical themes ===
Although Thornton's vocals were largely edited without his involvement, a background story for the album was created by the label and published in a series of eight segments, each revealing a new chapter and featuring an exclusive remix by the likes of Prefuse 73, Aesop Rock, Kid Loco, Spank Rock and others. The remixers appear in the story as "interpreters" hired to decipher the meaning of each remixed song, reportedly sent in a package to the offices of OCD.

The story begins three weeks after OCD received the package. Still unable to decode its meaning, the record company receives a phone call from an unknown source, tracked to Los Angeles, New York, Australia and Saturn. The caller claims to have received the same package five years ago and that it had brought destruction and chaos upon his society, and warns that they are coming after Octagon.

OCD then receives a message from a hacker identifying himself as Cassettes Won't Listen, who states that eight years ago, himself and five friends were abducted by aliens, tortured, cloned, and kept in isolation. The last survivor was killed by one of the clones, whom Cassettes Won't Listen then went underground to fight. Cassettes Won't Listen reveals that Dr. Octagon was imprisoned in the cell next to him, as "a prime candidate to study all things regarding grills, pills and bills". Octagon was cloned: his clones have been sent out to destroy the universe.

Rob Sonic learns that the clones were created by a giant gorilla driving a pickup truck, who intends to steal the package to prevent the world from hearing Octagon's message, allowing him to destroy the Earth. The story concludes with the remixers and OCD's staff escaping with the package on Kid Loco's plane. An intern briefly sees a figure standing on OCD's rooftop, wearing a labcoat with a stethoscope around his neck, holding the head of "some black hairy creature" in his hand.

PopMatters writer Michael Frauenhofer wrote that "Dr. Octagon's lyrics on this album typically appear to be unconnected, but over the course of each track can be seen building around a general theme, be it conservation, societal conformity, American militarism, or, yes, his characteristic fascination with sex."

According to Allmusic reviewer Marisa Brown, Dr. Octagon has matured and his focus has broadened since Dr. Octagonecologyst, in which the character focused largely on sex. Brown writes that Octagon is now "truly worried about the state of humankind, both physically and musically; in short, someone who could truly save the world". Brown also states that while the album focuses on science fiction and abstract themes, "there are also as many, if not more, songs about man's own behavior toward himself and his environment".

Frauenhofer referred to "Trees" as "a definite highlight" in which "the doctor drops his trademark off-kilter raps on, surprisingly, environmentalism". Pitchfork Media's Tom Breihan wrote that the song "Ants" compares "the humans infesting Earth to ants in a colony, enthused and disgusted at once". Frauenhofer, describing the song "Eat It," wrote that Princess Superstar "constantly references sex" while Dr. Octagon "confusingly interjects with his complaints about how women only want to go out and talk and eat", but Frauenhofer states that the sexual content of the album's lyrics is not as explicit as previous Thornton albums, such as Sex Style. Dallas Observer writer Geoff Johnston described the song as being "as profane as one would hope for".

=== Singles and music videos ===
"Aliens" was released as the first single from the album. A remix of "Aliens" by British drum and bass producer Sub Focus was chosen as compilation of the month in the May 2006 issue of Mixmag. Music videos were produced for the singles "Aliens" and "Trees", in which Thornton did not appear. The music video for "Trees" was produced as a public service announcement for MTV's "Break the Addiction" campaign, as well as a promo video for the album.

== Release ==
OCD International was created as an imprint of CMH to release the material. On October 12, 2004, a bootleg consisting of material produced by Chilly Chill from the Lench Mob was released under the title Dr. Octagon Part 2 by Real Talk Records. It was discontinued by court order.

On June 27, 2006, OCD International released One-Watt Sun's material under the title The Return of Dr. Octagon in the United States on compact disc, although the completed work more closely resembled a remix album than what Thornton had originally intended. In the United Kingdom, the CMH-completed album was released by Buttercuts Records on compact disc and vinyl.

CMH distributor World's Fair promoted The Return of Dr. Octagon as the official sequel to Dr. Octagonecologyst, and claimed that Thornton would tour in support of the album. Early news stories reported by outlets such as The Guardian, MTV2, MySpace, Remix Magazine, and The Washington Post endorsed the label's claims. Internet rumors began to spread that the album had been released without Thornton's authorization via what turned out to be an unsubstantiated piece of journalism by David Downs. In August, Thornton performed under the Dr. Octagon billing, but did not promote the album. According to Thornton, "This ain't the record I did. It was totally new music. I was really pissed off about people wanting me to go out and tour and do these songs." OCD originally intended to ship 50,000 units during the first year, but halted the plan due to the remarkably high volume of downloads received by the online remixes.

In September, Thornton stated that he had not received royalties from CMH Records. According to Thornton, "I hope they're sending them. You have another interview if they don't send me a check. Honestly, with the next single, I want them to leave me a sparkling diamond."

== Reception ==
Professional ratings
Aggregate scores
Source	Rating
Metacritic	61/100
Review scores
Source	Rating
AllMusic	3.5/5 stars
Drowned in Sound	7/10
The Observer	3/5 stars
The Phoenix	3/4 stars
Pitchfork	4.3/10
PopMatters	6/10
Rolling Stone	3/5 stars
Slant Magazine	3/5 stars
Spin	3/5 stars

Metacritic, which compiles reviews from a wide range of critics, gives the album a score of 61 out of 100, denoting generally favorable reviews. The album did not chart.

The earliest reviews of the album, published by the LA Weekly and Newsweek, were positive. Rolling Stone critic Christian Hoard wrote that "Octagon's verses often feel unfocused and random, but when he bears down he can be mesmerizing, channeling his quick-tongued rhymes with streetwise brassiness and cosmic vibrations." AllMusic reviewer Marisa Brown wrote that the album "doesn't always make a lot of sense, but that's the beauty of it. It's a kind of concept album that concentrates more on the actual overall sound than the concepts. Its elements are all on the very edge of control, which is both exhilarating and terrifying at the same time; if it works, it could bring us to where we've never been, protect us from what may be, but if it fails, it could kill us all." HipHopDX reviewer B. Love wrote, "This is Kool Keith's best album in years—arguably even better than his classic Octagonecologyst—and marks a fine return to form for one of rap music's most distinctive and original talents."

Other reviews were mixed. Pitchfork Media's Tom Breihan wrote that "Keith himself is responsible for all of the album's good moments. Even when he's in unhinged-rant mode, Keith's imagery often remains lucid. And so the album's best song is "Ants," where he comes off frantic but omnipotent...It's dense and fascinating stuff, a tantalizing glimpse of what might've happened if Keith hadn't treated the reemergence of his most popular persona like an easy payday." PopMatters writer Michael Frauenhofer wrote that "The Return of Dr. Octagon is still better than anything Kool Keith's done in a little while, but apart from its best tracks, it's not close to the level of his finest work of the past, and it doesn't really build much on the legend of Dr. Octagon, which still rests most firmly on the good doctor's debut." Geoff Johnston of Dallas Observer thought it was "not the triumphant return that most fans have been hoping for", as "the absence of [...] Dan the Automator and Q-Bert is painfully apparent throughout". The reviewer still believed the album was enjoyable, commending some of the tracks.

Negative reviews came from Billboard writer Ron Hart and Michael Pollock of Prefix magazine. Hart wrote that "Kool Keith has dropped nothing but disappointment and at an alarmingly steady rate". Pollock wrote that "Despite all the stupid records he's put out before, The Return of Dr. Octagon is the first one that plunges wholly into self-parody. He's now a fully realized clown, a prop, a joke and, most disappointingly, a sub-par rapper whose forced ideas and personality obstacles have devolved into flimsy, uninspired character sketches."

Dan the Automator criticized the release, stating "That wasn't a Dr. Octagon record. Dr. Octagon is me, Kool Keith, and Q-Bert. The label didn't have the legal right to use the name, but I didn't want to get involved in a legal battle...Keith's my man, just trying to make a little bit of money." KutMasta Kurt stated that Thornton was reluctant to perform songs from the album, because the lyrics did not fit the music. John Lindland, who coproduced the final album under the name One-Watt Sun, stated in defense of the album, "People say it's a fake. We don't have that feeling. We think that those are great tracks. It wasn't about remixing anything. They were our ideas, and Keith went on grooves that we sent to LA." In response to Fanatik J's criticism of the album, One Watt Sun referred to him as being disgruntled as a result of the label discarding his music. According to Lindland, "If we were him, we'd have [a] beef too".

Dr. Dooom 2, Thornton's 2008 follow-up to First Come, First Served, was produced in response to The Return of Dr. Octagon. According to Thornton, "I'm one of those artists that people take my music without my consent. People love to snatch my music and do things on their own. You got people that put me on beats I never rapped on. I just feel that it's a bad thing."

Thornton later revived the character for the albums Moosebumps: An Exploration Into Modern Day Horripilation and Space Goretex.

== Track listing ==
All music is composed by Ben Green and Simon Walbrook.

No.	Title	Writer(s)	Length
1.	"Our Operators Are Masturbating"	J. Lindland; S. Walbrook; B. Green	0:24
2.	"Trees"	J. Lindland; S. Walbrook; K. Thornton; B. Green	2:46
3.	"Aliens"	J. Lindland; S. Walbrook; K. Thornton; B. Green	2:54
4.	"Ants" (featuring DJ Dexter)	J. Lindland; S. Walbrook; K. Thornton; B. Green; D. Fabay	3:01
5.	"Don't Worry MZ Pop Music" (featuring April McClellan)	J. Lindland; S. Walbrook; B. Green; A. McClellan	0:32
6.	"Perfect World"	J. Lindland; S. Walbrook; K. Thornton; B. Green	2:37
7.	"The Turtle Skit"	J. Lindland; S. Walbrook; K. Thornton; B. Green	1:08
8.	"Al Green"	J. Lindland; S. Walbrook; K. Thornton; B. Green	2:45
9.	"A Gorilla Driving a Pick-Up Truck"	J. Lindland; S. Walbrook; K. Thornton; B. Green	3:35
10.	"Got Any Kids?"	J. Lindland; S. Walbrook; B. Green	0:23
11.	"Doctor Octagon"	J. Lindland; S. Walbrook; K. Thornton	2:58
12.	"It's the Morning"	J. Lindland; S. Walbrook; K. Thornton	2:48
13.	"Jumpstart"	J. Lindland; S. Walbrook; K. Thornton; B. Green	3:24
14.	"Eat It" (featuring Princess Superstar)	J. Lindland; S. Walbrook; K. Thornton; C. Kirschner; B. Green	5:01
15.	"Aliens (Subfocus'd)" (Bonus track)	J. Lindland; S. Walbrook; K. Thornton; B. Green	5:40
Total length:			34:16

== Personnel ==
- Keith Matthew Thornton – lyrics, vocals
- Concetta Kirschner – lyrics & vocals (track 14)
- April McClellan – vocals (track 5)
- Dexter Fabay – scratches (track 4)
- Simon Walbrook – producer, mixing
- Ben Green – producer (tracks: 1–10, 13–15), mixing
- John Lindland – songwriting
- Mike Letho – mixing
- Nilesh "Nilz" Patel – mastering
- Tomáš Sochůrek – additional mixing
- François Tétaz – additional mixing
- Argee Geronca – artwork design
- Brent Wadden – artwork design
- Mario Campos – artwork design
- Michael Tullberg – photography
