= Master of Illusion =

Master(s) of Illusion may refer to:

- Master of Illusion (album), an album by power metal band Power Quest
- Master of Illusion (video game), a magician simulation video game for the Nintendo DS
- Masters of Illusion (group), a hip-hop joint project of turntablist Kutmasta Kurt and emcees Kool Keith and Motion Man
  - Masters of Illusion (album), the group's self-titled album
- Masters of Illusion (TV series), a televised magic show
- "Master of Illusion", a song by Gotthard from the album Domino Effect
- Mysterio, a Marvel Comics supervillain commonly referred to as the Master of Illusion
