= Dr. Octagon =

Fictional character

- The image used by CMH Records in its promotion of The Return of Dr. Octagon.
- First appearance: Dr. Octagonecologyst
- Last appearance: Space Goretex
- Created by: Keith Thornton
- Portrayed by: Keith Thornton

In-universe information
- Occupation: Gynecologist and surgeon

Dr. Octagon is a persona created and used by American rapper Keith Matthew Thornton, better known as Kool Keith. Thornton performed and released four studio albums under the alias. Having introduced the character in 1993 on the unreleased Ultramagnetic MC's demo "Smoking Dust", Thornton's first full-length recording as Dr. Octagon was on his 1996 debut solo album, Dr. Octagonecologyst.

The character was murdered by Dr. Dooom on Thornton's 1999 album First Come, First Served, and was briefly revived before once again being killed on Thornton's 2008 album Dr. Dooom 2, in response to the release of The Return of Dr. Octagon, an album largely produced without Thornton's involvement. Kool Keith reunited with Dan the Automator and DJ Qbert to release Moosebumps: An Exploration Into Modern Day Horripilation on April 6, 2018.

== Biography ==
Dr. Octagon is an extraterrestrial surgeon from Jupiter who uses space technology and primitive tools to perform medical procedures on his patients, some of whom die as he conducts his rounds, while others are murdered by his careless, barbaric acts. Octagon also practices as an orthopaedic gynaecologist and seduces and engages in sexual intercourse with his female patients and nurses.

His physical features include having yellow eyes, green and silver skin which also changes to blue and brown, a pink-and-white Afro, and a brain that glows yellow, black, red, green, and purple. Octagon specifies a few of the services he offers, such as treatment of chimpanzee acne and moosebumps, rectal rebuilding surgery, and relocating of saliva glands.

According to Kool Keith's "R.I.P. Dr. Octagon", Dr. Dooom stabbed Dr. Octagon over 17 times after he would come back to life from being drowned under water. Multiple music critics and record producers made attempts to keep him alive, but Dooom returned to finally kill Octagon by electrocuting him with an electric razor. However, Kool Keith has continued to make appearances as Dr. Octagon.

== History ==
The earliest instance of Thornton's Dr. Octagon character appears on the unreleased Ultramagnetic MC's demo "Smoking Dust", recorded in 1993 and included in the 1994 compilation album The Basement Tapes 1984–1990.

Thornton and KutMasta Kurt recorded two songs under the alias Dr. Octagon, "Dr. Octagon" and "Technical Difficulties." Thornton mailed the songs to radio stations as a teaser, as well as giving copies to several DJs, as well as producer Dan "The Automator" Nakamura, resulting in the production of Dr. Octagonecologyst.

The album was recorded in Automator's studio in the basement of his parents' San Francisco home. Dr. Octagonecologyst featured the work of turntablist DJ Qbert and additional production by KutMasta Kurt. An instrumental version of the album was released under the title Instrumentalyst (Octagon Beats). KutMasta Kurt later pursued legal action against Automator because Kurt's demos had initiated the project. Kurt told the AV Club, “I got the whole [Dr. Octagon] thing started and really got nothing directly out of it. [Automator] ran with it, but he never gave credit to the person who threw the ball. At the end of the day, I actually had to sue the guy."

The album examines the impersonal, delusional and authoritarian aspects of institutions and bureaucracies using the general hospital and psych ward as main metaphor. The hyper-love of new technologies is also a theme.

In promotion of the album, Thornton toured under the Dr. Octagon billing. These performances featured a full live band, an on-stage breakdancer and appearances by Invisibl Skratch Piklz. Nakamura has referred to Dr. Octagon as a three-person group rather than an alias of Thornton, and these claims were reported by the press.

Thornton later expressed some frustration with the "Dr. Octagon" nickname, saying, "Octagon wasn't my life...I've done a lot of things that were totally around different things other than Octagon. Are some people just afraid to venture off into my life and see that I do other things which are great? I think people stuck me with something."

In 2002, Thornton announced The Resurrection of Dr. Octagon, a proposed sequel to Dr. Octagonecologyst, that would reintroduce the character. Los Angeles-based producer Fanatik J was chosen to create the music for the album. Thornton himself took part in the production of early material for the project, playing bass, guitar, and keyboards on many of the tracks.

After shopping around demos for the proposed album, Thornton signed a contract with CMH Records to release the album. On July 23, 2002, Rolling Stone reported that a new Dr. Octagon album would be released in February 2003. As production on the album was underway, Thornton had a falling out with Fanatik J over contract rights, and the One-Watt Sun production team was hired to create the album's music. After completing three vocal tracks with the label, based upon rough sonic themes created by the production team, Thornton had a falling out with the label, and gave the label recordings he had made two years previously, consisting of Thornton rapping and goofing off, in order to complete his contract. The resulting album, The Return of Dr. Octagon, was largely produced without Thornton's involvement, and did not resemble the direction Thornton had initially intended for the album.

Promotional materials, including music videos, were produced without Thornton's involvement. Thornton states that he was "shocked" by the label's misrepresentation. Following the release of the album, Thornton performed under the Dr. Octagon billing, but did not promote the album. Dr. Dooom 2, Thornton's 2008 follow-up to First Come, First Served, was produced in response to The Return of Dr. Octagon.

In 2013, Dr. Octagon made a guest appearance on the Yeah Yeah Yeahs song "Buried Alive", which was featured on their album Mosquito.

Once again performing as Dr. Octagon, Kool Keith reunited with Dan The Automator and DJ Qbert to release Moosebumps: An Exploration Into Modern Day Horripilation on Bulk Recordings. The album was released on streaming services on April 6, 2018, with the physical release scheduled for Record Store Day, April 21, 2018. The Record Store Day release includes both vinyl and CD copies. Using his Deltron persona, Del the Funky Homosapien guests on "3030 Meets the Doc, Pt. 1". NPR offered a first look at the album on March 29, 2018. 2020's Space Goretex features Dr. Octagon and two of Thornton's other personas, Dr. Dooom and Black Elvis.

== Discography ==
Studio albums

- 1996 – Dr. Octagonecologyst
- 2006 – The Return of Dr. Octagon
- 2008 – Dr. Dooom 2
- 2018 – Moosebumps: An Exploration Into Modern Day Horripilation
