= El Dorado Driven =

Studio album by Kool Keith
- Released: November 4, 2014
- Recorded: 2012–2014
- Genre: Alternative hip-hop; underground hip-hop
- Length: 1:01:55
- Label: Adhoksaja Records; Volunteer Media
- Producer: Kool Keith (exec.); Teddy Bass (also exec.)

Kool Keith chronology
Demolition Crash (2014)	El Dorado Driven (2014)	Feature Magnetic (2016)

Teddy Bass Presents El Dorado Driven is the thirteenth solo studio album by American hip-hop recording artist Kool Keith. It was released on November 4, 2014 via Adhoksaja Records under exclusive license to Vancouver-based indie label Volunteer Media. Its audio production was entirely handled by Teddy Bass, and featured guest appearances from Denis Deft, Lord Diamonds, Michael Rushden, Sadat X, and Thirstin Howl III.

A music video for "Woman You The Best" was directed by Stuey Kubrick and released on October 30, 2014.

== Track listing ==
All music is composed by Teddy Bass.

No.	Title	Length
1.	"Cruise Control"	2:30
2.	"Woman You The Best"	4:02
3.	"New York Outfit" (featuring Sadat X & Thirstin Howl III)	3:21
4.	"Out There"	6:01
5.	"Walk On Water" (featuring Lord Diamonds & Michael Rushden)	4:43
6.	"Boss To The Banger"	3:48
7.	"Rubdown"	4:15
8.	"Back To The Basics"	4:58
9.	"Superbowl Ring"	3:46
10.	"Muscles"	5:01
11.	"Pink Juice"	2:15
12.	"Want This" (featuring Denis Deft)	3:36
13.	"Sport That"	4:18
14.	"Up Into Space"	4:25
15.	"Axiom"	3:30
16.	"Cobra Out"	1:29
Total length:		1:01:55

== Personnel ==
- Keith Matthew Thornton - vocals, executive producer
- Teddy Bass - producer, executive producer
- Weezl - scratches
- Kurt Matlin - mastering
- Derek Murphy - vocals (track 3)
- Victor DeJesus - vocals (track 3)
- Robert Karl Edward Koch - vocals (track 5)
- Michael J Gilbert - vocals (track 5)
- Denis Martinez - vocals (track 12)
- MIKE - artwork
