= Masters of Illusion (album) =

Studio album by Masters of Illusion
- Released: November 14, 2000
- Recorded: 1998–2000
- Genre: Alternative hip-hop; underground hip-hop
- Length: 65:15
- Label: Threshold
- Producer: KutMasta Kurt

Kool Keith chronology
Pimp to Eat (2000)	Masters of Illusion (2000)	Spankmaster (2001)

KutMasta Kurt chronology
Masters of Illusion (2000)	Diesel Truckers (2004)

Motion Man chronology
Masters of Illusion (2000)	Clearing the Field (2002)

Singles from Masters of Illusion
- 1. "Partnas Confused/Masters Of Illusion" Released: 1998; 2. "Partnas Confused/Magnum Be I" Released: 1999; 3. "We All Over/Souped Up" Released: 2000; 4. "The Bay-Bronx Bridge/Silk Suit, Black Linen" Released: 2000; 5. "Urban Legends/Let Me Talk To You" Released: 2001

Professional ratings
Review scores
Source	Rating
Allmusic	4/5 stars
HipHopDX	4.5/5 stars
RapReviews	9/10 stars

Masters of Illusion is the debut album of American hip-hop group Masters of Illusion, composed of producer KutMasta Kurt and rappers Kool Keith & Motion Man. It was released on November 14, 2000, via Threshold Records. The project features no guest emcees, but does feature DJ cuts/scratches by DJ Revolution, DJ Babu and DJ Rhettmatic.

Some CD releases also come with a free instrumental version of the album, as is typical with Kool Keith releases (Dr. Octagonecologyst, First Come, First Served, etc.)

== Track listing ==
All music is composed by KutMasta Kurt.

No.	Title	Writer(s)	Length
1.	"Figment" (Intro)	P. Laster; K. Matlin; K. Thornton	0:39
2.	"Masters of Illusion"	P. Laster; K. Matlin; K. Thornton	3:06
3.	"We All Over"	P. Laster; K. Matlin; K. Thornton	3:43
4.	"Magnum Be I"	P. Laster; K. Matlin	3:21
5.	"U Want Freestyle?"	K. Matlin; K. Thornton	2:28
6.	"Scared Straight"	P. Laster; K. Matlin; K. Thornton	3:01
7.	"Time 2 Get Right"	P. Laster; K. Matlin; K. Thornton	4:21
8.	"Step Up"	P. Laster; K. Matlin; K. Thornton	3:20
9.	"The Funky Redneck" (Skit)	P. Laster; K. Matlin; K. Thornton	1:48
10.	"East West Hustlers"	P. Laster; K. Matlin; K. Thornton	4:24
11.	"The Bay-Bronx Bridge"	P. Laster; K. Matlin; K. Thornton	3:40
12.	"Call the National Guard"	P. Laster; K. Matlin	3:06
13.	"Back up Kid"	K. Matlin; K. Thornton	3:34
14.	"Partnas Confused"	P. Laster; K. Matlin; K. Thornton	3:45
15.	"Souped Up"	P. Laster; K. Matlin; K. Thornton	3:23
16.	"Urban Legends"	P. Laster; K. Matlin; K. Thornton	3:41
17.	"Clifton's Conversation" (Skit)	P. Laster; K. Matlin; K. Thornton	0:21
18.	"Let Me Talk to You"	P. Laster; K. Matlin; K. Thornton	11:52
19.	"Silk Suit Black Linen"	P. Laster; K. Matlin; K. Thornton	1:42
Total length:			1:05:15

Notes

- Tracks 3, 5, 8, 12 and 14 featured DJ cuts by DJ Revolution
- Track 7 featured DJ cuts by DJ Rhettmatic
- Track 16 featured DJ cuts by DJ Babu

== Personnel ==
- Kurt Matlin – lyrics, producer, mixing, arranging, executive producer
- Keith Matthew Thornton – lyrics (tracks: 1–3, 5–11, 13–19), vocals
- Paul K. Laster – lyrics (tracks: 1–4, 6–12, 14–19), vocals
- Kurt G. Hoffman – scratches/cuts (tracks: 3, 5, 8, 12, 14)
- Nazareth Nirza – scratches/cuts (track 7)
- Melvin Babu – scratches/cuts (track 16)
- Scott Zuschin – voice (track 1)
- Ken Lee – mastering
- Jim Rasfeld – layout
- James Reitano – artwork
