= Dr. Octagonecologyst =

Studio album by Dr. Octagon
- Released: April 1996
- Recorded: 1995–1996
- Studio: The Glue Factory (San Francisco)
- Genres: East Coast hip-hop; alternative hip-hop; psychedelic rap
- Length: 68:34 (original issue); 65:48 (reissue)
- Labels: Bulk; Mo' Wax; DreamWorks (1997 reissue)
- Producers: Dan the Automator; KutMasta Kurt ("Technical Difficulties", "Dr. Octagon")

Kool Keith chronology
Dr. Octagonecologyst (1996)	Big Time (1996)

Singles from Dr. Octagonecologyst
- 1. "Earth People" Released: 1995; 2. "3000" Released: 1996; 3. "Blue Flowers" Released: 1996

Dr. Octagonecologyst is the debut solo album by the American rapper and Ultramagnetic MCs member Kool Keith, using the alias Dr. Octagon. It was released through Bulk Recordings in April 1996. A release in the United Kingdom through Mo' Wax followed in May the same year. The album was reissued with a different track listing by DreamWorks Records in 1997. The album was produced by Dan "the Automator" Nakamura and featured the work of turntablist DJ Qbert. KutMasta Kurt provided additional production work. The cover artwork was drawn by Brian "Pushead" Schroeder.

Dr. Octagonecologyst introduces the character of Dr. Octagon, a homicidal, extraterrestrial, time-traveling gynecologist and surgeon. The album's distinctive sound fuses genres such as psychedelic music, trip hop, and electronic music. Thornton's lyrics are often abstract, absurd, and avant-garde, drawing on surrealism, non sequiturs, hallucinatory psychedelia, and themes of horror, science fiction, as well as sexual humor, absurdist/surrealistic humor, and juvenile humor.

Kool Keith's lyrics and Nakamura's production were highly praised, as was DJ Qbert's innovative scratching. The album has been ranked as one of the best hip-hop albums of the 1990s. The character of Dr. Octagon has also appeared in Kool Keith projects like First Come, First Served (1999) and Dr. Dooom 2 (2008), both of which contain tracks in which Octagon is murdered by Dr. Dooom.

== Music ==
=== Production ===
Ultramagnetic MCs member Keith "Kool Keith" Thornton was seeking a new project after the release of his group's third album, The Four Horsemen, in 1993. Keith and producer KutMasta Kurt – who were working on a variety of demos together – recorded two songs called "Dr. Octagon" and "Technical Difficulties". Thornton mailed the songs to radio stations as well as giving copies to several DJs and record producer Dan the Automator. This led to Nakamura's role in producing the album. Dr. Octagonecologyst was recorded in Automator's studio in the basement of his parents' San Francisco home.

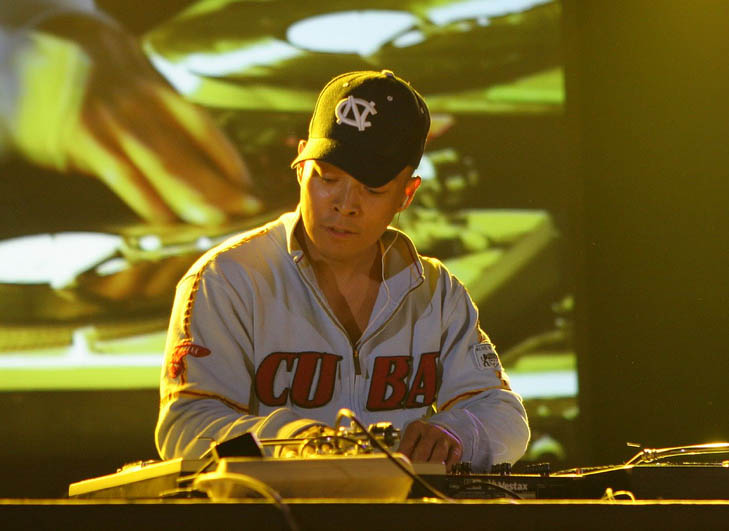
DJ Qbert made fundamental contributions to the album's production with his innovative scratching.

Dr. Octagonecologyst has been praised for its original sound, which has often been attributed to Nakamura. However, Thornton states that he was largely involved with the production of the album. Thornton is quoted as saying "Automator and Kurt are probably receiving more credit than I did, but I was a big musical person behind Octagon." Nakamura has said he wanted Dr. Octagonecologyst to stand out from other hip-hop albums, citing the music of Eric B. & Rakim, Mantronix, and Run-D.M.C. as influences. Nakamura said, "Hip-hop was always inventive. Then the '90s hit and everyone wants to be Dr. Dre; no one wants to be their own thing anymore. Everyone now wants to have the Lexus and deal pounds of drugs. We don't do that. That's not our lifestyle. You don't see us coming out with the fur coat. There's more to music than that." The album incorporates organic instrumentation and features Moog synthesizer, flute, and string instruments.

Dialogue excerpts from pornographic films appear on multiple tracks. On the Bulk Recordings edition of the album, "halfsharkalligatorhalfman" is preceded by an excerpt from the comedy film Cabin Boy. Lily Moayeri of Rolling Stone called the album a "psychedelic hip-hop concept album." AllMusic reviewer Steve Huey wrote that the album "shed some light on the burgeoning turntablist revival via the scratching fireworks of DJ Q-Bert" and its "futuristic, horror-soundtrack production seemed to bridge the gap between hip-hop and the more electronic-oriented trip-hop". Steve "Flash" Juon of RapReviews also praised its sound, writing that "Cuts are provided with infinite skill and precision by DJ Q-Bert" and that the DJ Shadow/Automator remix of "Waiting List" is "so good that you could hardly miss the original, if indeed there was one." An instrumental version of the album was released in 1996 under the title Instrumentalyst (Octagon Beats). Kembrew McLeod of AllMusic wrote of the instrumental album, stating "If any other artist released an album such as this it would be considered throwaway trash—something for the hardcore fans. But Dan the Automator's backing tracks are so fresh and original, it's actually nice to just hear the beats minus the rhymes."

=== Lyrical themes and storyline ===
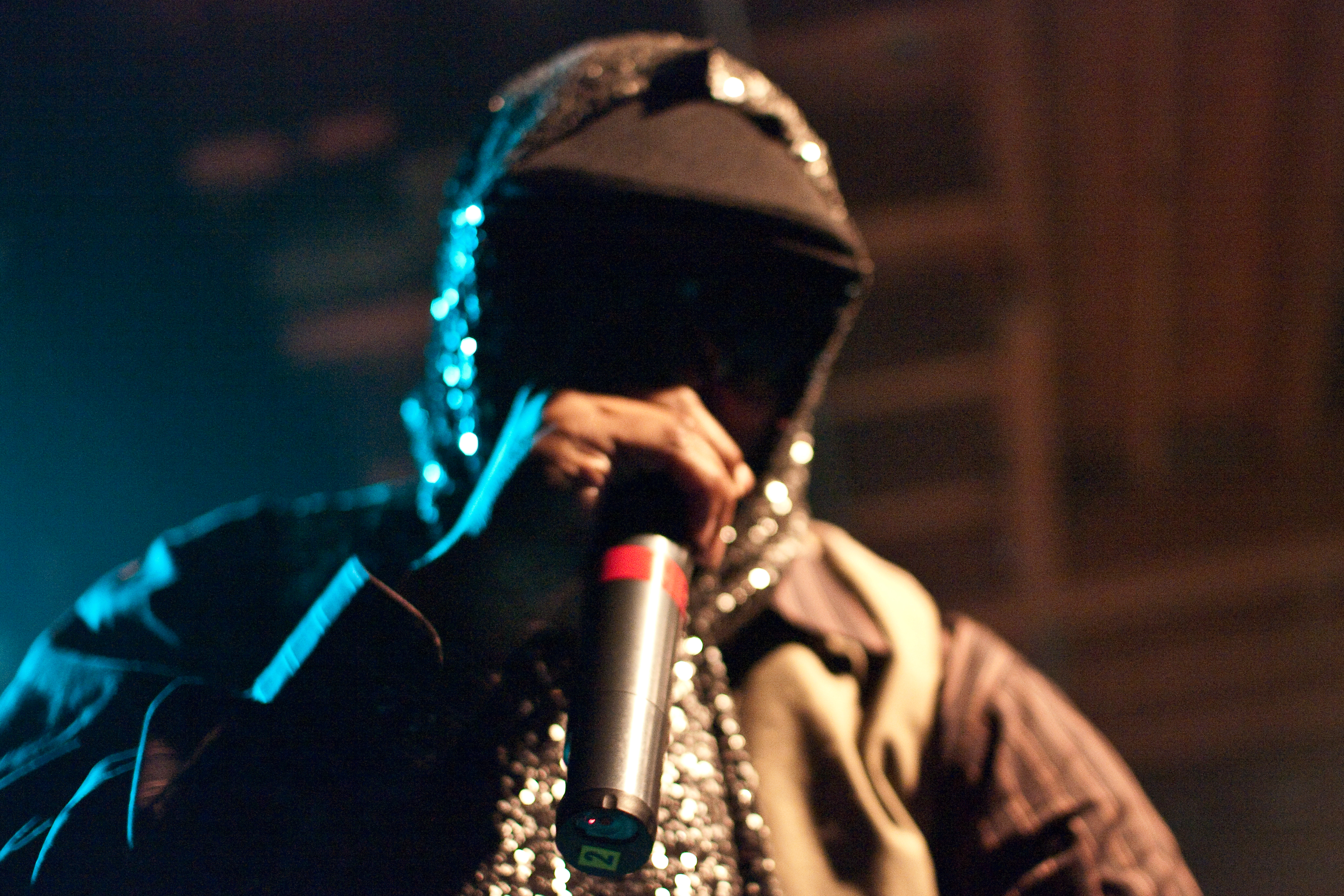
Thornton received praise for his unconventional lyrics.

Thornton has been praised for his lyrics, which are often abstract, surreal, and filled with non-sequiturs and juvenile humor. Music critic Chairman Mao wrote that Dr. Octagonecologyst occupies "...the heretofore-undefined area where hip-hop meets hallucinatory sci-fi and porn." In the album's narrative, Dr. Octagon is an extraterrestrial, time-traveling gynecologist and surgeon originally from Jupiter. Dr. Octagon's history is detailed throughout the album's songs, skits, and samples. "Real Raw" describes him as having yellow eyes, green skin, and a pink-and-white Afro haircut. "General Hospital," "A Visit to the Gynecologist," and "Elective Surgery" detail a list of services offered by Octagon, who claims to treat chimpanzee acne and moosebumps, and relocating saliva glands. Octagon is described as being incompetent, as many of his surgery patients die as he conducts his rounds. Octagon also pretends to be a female gynecologist and often has sex with female patients and nurses.

According to Mickey Hess, author of Is Hip Hop Dead? The Past, Present, and Future of America's Most-Wanted Music, "The album's beginning and ending tie together the stories of the fictional character Dr. Octagon and the rap career of Kool Keith Thornton himself: We begin with '3000' and end with '1977,' which purports to be an audio recording from an early rap performance by Kool Keith ... announcing a 1977 rap show featuring ... pioneers Grandmaster Flash, Kool Herc, the L Brothers, and the original scratch creator Grand Wizzard Theodore. The message is clear: Kool Keith is a part of hip-hop history, and even as rap moves on to the future, Dr. Octagon does not replace Kool Keith."

=== Singles ===
"Earth People," released in 1995 on Bulk Recordings, was the first single from the album. The 12-inch single featured the songs "No Awareness (Lyrical Hydraulics)", "Bear Witness (Q-Bert Gets Biz)", and the "Interstellar Time Travel" and "Earth Planet" mixes of "Earth People". "3000" and "Blue Flowers" followed as singles in 1996. The "3000" 12-inch also featured the "Automator 1.2 Remix", "Bear Witness (Automator's Two Turntables and a Razor Blade Re-Edit)", and "Tricknology 101".

The "Blue Flowers" 12-inch single release featured the original and instrumental versions of the song, the "Automator Remix", and the instrumental version of the remix. The "Blue Flowers" maxi single featured the original vocal and instrumental versions, the vocal and instrumental versions of the "Automator Remix", the "Flower Bed Mix *2" by DJ Crystl, the "Secondary Diagnostic Mix" by Photek, and the DJ Hype remix. A second 12-inch single of "Blue Flowers" featured vocal and instrumental versions of the "Automator's Stop Confusing Me Remake", vocal and instrumental versions of Prince Paul's "So Beautiful Mix", the a cappella version of the song, and the track "halfsharkalligatorhalfman". A second maxi single of "Blue Flowers" featured, in addition to earlier mixes of the song, vocal and instrumental versions of the "Meditation Mix" by KutMasta Kurt. A third 12-inch single was released featuring remixes by DJ Hype and Photek.

== Release and reception ==
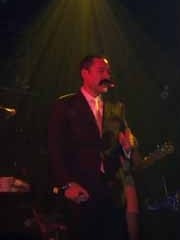
Dan Nakamura received praise for the album's production.

Professional ratings
Review scores
Source	Rating
AllMusic	5/5 stars
Alternative Press	4/5
Entertainment Weekly	C
Mojo	4/5 stars
Muzik	5/5 stars
NME	7/10
Pitchfork	8.7/10
Rolling Stone	3.5/5 stars
The Rolling Stone Album Guide	4/5 stars
Spin	8/10

The album was released through Bulk Recordings in April 1996. It entered the Gavin retail rap chart at no. 18 on May 3, 1996. Although the album sold relatively well, Nakamura has said it was under-promoted because it was released by an independent label. In the United States, the album was issued by Bulk Records on vinyl as a double LP, and on compact disc with bonus tracks. Separately, it was also issued by Mo' Wax in the UK as a triple LP and CD, reflecting the track listing of the Bulk Recordings compact disc. "When we did this record we thought of it as an underground joint", Nakamura said. None of the offers made by major record companies appealed to Nakamura and Thornton until DreamWorks Records offered to re-release the album. It was released through Dreamworks in 1997 with numerous changes to the tracklist. Dr. Octagonecologyst was re-released on triple vinyl in June 2017 by Geffen/UMe/Universal via Get on Down, which included the original album, unreleased tracks from the era, and remixes.

In promotion of the album, Thornton planned to perform under the Dr. Octagon name. These performances were supposed to feature a full live band, an on-stage breakdancer, and appearances by Invisibl Skratch Piklz. It's unclear why they did not play these shows, but Thornton, Nakamura, and DJ Q-Bert played for the first time together on March 6, 2017, in San Francisco. Nakamura has referred to Dr. Octagon as a three-person group rather than an alias of Thornton, and these claims were reported by the press.

Dr. Octagonecologyst received largely positive reviews. Although it did not chart, Nakamura said the album sold well, even during its initial underground release. "We didn't have records in every store. We'd have 10 copies in Tower and the next day they'd be sold out, and then we wouldn't get another copy in for another month." Robert Christgau gave the album an honorable mention, citing the album's introduction and the songs "Earth People" and "Wild and Crazy" as highlights, and writing simply "the shock horror! the shock horror! the perhaps authentically crazy! [sic]" NME described the album as "nineteen strong doses of pure, undiluted hip-hop." Steve "Flash" Juon of RapReviews wrote that "If you aren't laughing, you should be bugging. Kool Keith obviously doesn't care. You should, though, because like every other record Keith has ever been on, it will be hailed ten years from now as a classic." Chairman Mao of Rolling Stone remarked that "Kool Keith leads and oversees the chaos with a Zappa-esque commitment to decadence."

Alternative Press praised the album's "deep, dubby bass lines, spooky melodic riffs and consistently heavy beats", while The New York Times called it "one of the most progressive rap projects to be released in the past year." JazzTimes lauded Thornton's lyrics, writing that his "...oddball excursions reach near-cinematic levels." Melody Maker called it "bloody essential" and stated, "While commercial American hip hop is slithering into an insipid mire of soulless, identikit swingbeat, Dr. Octagon has made an album swathed in character [...] Get yer prescription fixed." The Source awarded Dr. Octagonecologyst 3.5 out of 5 mics, calling it a "quality album with the proper ingredients". In a more critical review, Entertainment Weekly writer David Browne praised the album's production but disliked Thornton's "inane, often gruesome" lyrics, instead recommending the album's instrumental counterpart Instrumentalyst to listeners.

Following initial reactions to the album, Dr. Octagonecologyst continued to earn praise from contemporary writers and music critics. In the Virgin Encyclopedia of Popular Music, the album received a rating of four out of five stars. In The New Rolling Stone Album Guide, Peter Relic described it as a "slab of mondo bizzaro brilliance... totally unlike anything else and totally right". PopMatters columnist Michael Frauenhofer called it "a landmark album of dope beats and mind-bending experimental flows." Steve Huey of AllMusic wrote that the album "remains as startling and original as the day it was released." In 2017, Pitchfork reviewer Nate Patrin wrote that "Dr. Octagonecologyst still feels as much out of its time as it does out of its mind." Thornton, however, has since dismissed the album, saying that it unfairly overshadows his later work, and that the only new audience it attracted was white.

== Influence ==
Allmusic reviewer Steve Huey wrote that Dr. Octagonecologyst "...attracted more attention than any non-mainstream rap album in quite a while, thanks to its inventive production and Keith's bizarre, free-associative rhymes." Huey also states that Dr. Octagonecologyst represented "...the first truly new, genuine alternative to commercial hip-hop since the Native Tongues' heyday. It appealed strongly to alternative audiences who'd grown up with rap music, but simply hadn't related to it since the rise of gangsta". Thornton expressed some frustration with the Dr. Octagon nickname, saying, "I just made a record. I was an artist on a project, and I think people misconcepted [sic] that I was an artist on a project. Octagon wasn't my life...I've done a lot of things that were totally around different things other than Octagon. Are some people just afraid to venture off into my life and see that I do other things which are great? I think people stuck me with something."

In 1999, Thornton introduced the character of Dr. Dooom on the album First Come, First Served (1999). The album featured a track in which the character murdered Dr. Octagon. In 2002, Thornton announced The Resurrection of Dr. Octagon, a proposed sequel to Dr. Octagonecologyst that would reintroduce the character. The resulting album, The Return of Dr. Octagon released in 2006, was largely produced without Thornton's involvement, based upon three completed vocal tracks and reconstructed outtakes. Thornton later produced Dr. Dooom 2 in response to The Return of Dr. Octagon. Later, Thornton revived the character for the albums Moosebumps: An Exploration Into Modern Day Horripilation and Space Goretex.

In 2006, Dr. Octagonecologyst was included in Robert Dimery's book 1001 Albums You Must Hear Before You Die.

In 2011, DIS magazine released a 32-minute mixtape, "Octagonecologyst (Sandra Bernhard Remix)" by Feminine Itch, which married instrumentals from the album with Sandra Bernhard's stand-up comedy.

== Track listing ==
‡	Removed from final release

Dr. Octagon (Bulk Recordings/Mo' Wax Edition)
No.	Title	Writer(s)	Producer(s)	Length
1.	"Intro"	Nakamura	Dan the Automator	1:16
2.	"3000"	Thornton; Nakamura	Dan the Automator	3:20
3.	"I Got to Tell You"	Thornton; Nakamura	Dan the Automator	0:48
4.	"Earth People"	Thornton; Nakamura	Dan the Automator	4:46
5.	"No Awareness" (featuring Sir Menelik)	Thornton; Nakamura; Collington	Dan the Automator	4:55
6.	"Technical Difficulties ‡"	Thornton; Matlin	KutMasta Kurt	2:54
7.	"General Hospital"	Nakamura	Dan the Automator	0:26
8.	"Blue Flowers"	Thornton; Nakamura	Dan the Automator	3:17
9.	"A Visit to the Gynecologyst"	Nakamura	Dan the Automator	2:20
10.	"Bear Witness"	Thornton; Nakamura	Dan the Automator	3:00
11.	"Dr. Octagon" (featuring Sir Menelik)	Thornton; Matlin; Collington	KutMasta Kurt	4:37
12.	"Girl Let Me Touch You"	Thornton; Nakamura	Dan the Automator	3:40
13.	"I'm Destructive"	Thornton; Nakamura	Dan the Automator	3:25
14.	"Wild and Crazy"	Thornton; Nakamura	Dan the Automator	4:27
15.	"Elective Surgery"	Thornton; Nakamura	Dan the Automator	0:52
16.	"On Production ‡" (featuring Sir Menelik)	Thornton; Nakamura; Collington	Dan the Automator	2:43
17.	"Biology 101 ‡" (featuring Sir Menelik)	Thornton; Nakamura; Collington	Dan the Automator	4:57
18.	"Earth People (Earth Planet Mix) ‡"	Thornton; Nakamura	Dan the Automator	4:42
19.	"Waiting List" (DJ Shadow/Automator Mix) (Contains the hidden track "halfsharkalligatorhalfman")	Thornton; Nakamura	Dan the Automator	11:35

†	Not featured on original release

Dr. Octagonecologyst (DreamWorks Records edition)
No.	Title	Writer(s)	Producer(s)	Length
1.	"Intro"	Nakamura	Dan the Automator	1:16
2.	"3000"	Thornton; Nakamura	Dan the Automator	3:20
3.	"I Got to Tell You"	Thornton; Nakamura	Dan the Automator	0:48
4.	"Earth People"	Thornton; Nakamura	Dan the Automator	4:58
5.	"No Awareness" (featuring Sir Menelik)	Thornton; Nakamura; Collington	Dan the Automator	4:25
6.	"Real Raw †"	Thornton; Nakamura	Dan the Automator	5:35
7.	"General Hospital"	Nakamura	Dan the Automator	0:26
8.	"Blue Flowers"	Thornton; Nakamura	Dan the Automator	3:17
9.	"Technical Difficulties (Remix) †"	Thornton; Matlin	KutMasta Kurt	2:57
10.	"A Visit to the Gynecologyst"	Nakamura	Dan the Automator	2:20
11.	"Bear Witness"	Thornton; Nakamura	Dan the Automator	3:00
12.	"Dr. Octagon" (featuring Sir Menelik)	Thornton; Matlin; Collington	KutMasta Kurt	4:37
13.	"Girl Let Me Touch You"	Thornton; Nakamura	Dan the Automator	3:40
14.	"I'm Destructive"	Thornton; Nakamura	Dan the Automator	3:25
15.	"Wild and Crazy"	Thornton; Nakamura	Dan the Automator	4:27
16.	"Elective Surgery"	Thornton; Nakamura	Dan the Automator	0:52
17.	"halfsharkalligatorhalfman"	Thornton; Nakamura	Dan the Automator	4:29
18.	"Blue Flowers Revisited †"	Thornton; Nakamura	Dan the Automator	4:15
19.	"Waiting List" (DJ Shadow/Automator Mix)	Thornton; Nakamura	Dan the Automator	5:09
20.	"1977 †"	Thornton; Nakamura	Dan the Automator	2:24
Total length:				65:48

== Accolades ==
Accolades for Dr. Octagonecologyst
Publication	Country	Accolade	Year	Rank
Blow Up	Italy	600 Essential Albums	2005	—N/a
Ego Trip	USA	Hip Hop's Greatest Albums by Year 1980–1998	1999	12
Pitchfork Media	USA	Top 100 Albums of the 1990s	2003	71
Robert Dimery	USA	1001 Albums You Must Hear Before You Die	2005	—N/a
Spin	USA	The 90 Greatest Albums of the 90s	1999	86
Hip Hop Connection	UK	The 100 Greatest Rap Albums 1995–2005	2006	90

== Personnel ==
Information taken from liner notes.

=== Musicians ===
- Kool Keith – vocals, bass guitar (tracks 8, 13, 14 and 17)
- Dan the Automator – violin, keyboards
- Andy Boy – banjo, guitar (track 13)
- Phil Bright – guitar (track 4), bass guitar (track 12)
- Curt Kobane – clarinet, flute
- Gordon Chumway – drums
- Burt King Kong – organ, piano
- DJ Q-Bert – turntables, harp
- Kelly Wootan – tambourine

=== Additional personnel ===
- Dan the Automator – producer, mixing, mastering
- Gordon Chumway – second engineer
- Pushead – illustrations
- Mark Senasac – mastering
- Phillip Collington (Chewbacca Uncircumcised) – composition
