= Project Polaroid =

Studio album by Kool Keith & TomC3
- Released: April 25, 2006
- Recorded: 2006
- Studios: The Closet (East); The Closet (West)
- Genres: Alternative hip-hop; underground hip-hop
- Length: 46:53
- Label: Threshold Recordings LLC
- Producer: TomC3

Kool Keith chronology
Nogatco Rd. (2006)	Project Polaroid (2006)	The Return of Dr. Octagon (2006)

Singles from Project Polaroid
- 1. "Digital Engineering/Diamond District" Released: March 3, 2006

The Original SoundTrack Album of Project Polaroid is the studio album by American hip-hop duo Project Polaroid, composed of New York rapper Kool Keith and Bay Area producer TomC3. It was released worldwide on April 25, 2006 via Threshold Recordings and on June 28, 2006 in Japan via Swamp Records. Audio production of the project was entirely handled by TomC3, and featured guest appearances from Organized Konfusion's Prince Po, Masters of Illusion's Motion Man, and Third Sight's Roughneck Jihad.

== Track listing ==
All music is composed by TomC3.

No.	Title	Length
1.	"Project Polaroid"	3:24
2.	"Space 8000"	3:38
3.	"Talk To The Romans"	3:06
4.	"Mechanical Mechanix" (featuring Prince Po)	2:42
5.	"I’m Libra"	3:22
6.	"Diamond District"	3:42
7.	"Rhyme That Quit"	3:05
8.	"Clubber Lang" (featuring Motion Man)	2:17
9.	"Uphill...Strange"	4:49
10.	"Digital Engineering"	2:29
11.	"The Overviewer"	3:56
12.	"Feel Me" (featuring Roughneck Jihad)	5:04
13.	"Midwestern Shoe Calhoun"	3:36
14.	"Photo Shop"	1:43
Total length:		46:53

Japanese edition bonus track
No.	Title	Length
15.	"Digital Engineering" (Remix)

== Personnel ==
- Keith Matthew Thornton – main artist, vocals
- Tom Cleary – main artist, producer, recording, mixing
- Raggedy Andy – recording, design, layout, photography
- David Cheppa – mastering
- Nadjib Boulaone – scratches
- Lawrence Baskerville – featured artist (track 4)
- Paul K. Laster – featured artist (track 8)
- Roughneck Jihad – featured artist (track 12)

== Release history ==
Region	Date	Format(s)	Label(s)
Worldwide	April 25, 2006	CD; LP; cassette	Threshold Recordings
Japan	June 28, 2006	CD; Digipak	Swamp Records
