= Love and Danger =

Studio album by Kool Keith
- Released: June 5, 2012
- Studio: Innovative Music Studio (New York, NY)
- Genre: Hip-hop
- Length: 55:21
- Label: Junkadelic Music
- Producer: Kool Keith (exec.); DJ Junkaz Lou (also exec.); Big Sche Eastwood; Ariel Caban

Kool Keith chronology
Tashan Dorrsett (2009)	Love and Danger (2012)	Demolition Crash (2014)

Professional ratings
Aggregate scores
Source	Rating
Metacritic	68/100
Review scores
Source	Rating
HipHopDX	2.5/5 stars
PopMatters	7/10 stars
RapReviews	7/10 stars

Love and Danger is the eleventh solo studio album by American recording artist Kool Keith. It was released on June 5, 2012, via Junkadelic Music and produced entirely by DJ Junkaz Lou, except for two tracks produced by Big Sche Eastwood and Ariel Caban. The project featured guest appearances from Agallah, Keith Murray, Megabone, NYM, The I.M.O., and Mr. Sche.

== Track listing ==
No.	Title	Producer(s)	Length
1.	"The Dangerous Liaisons" (Intro)	DJ Junkaz Lou	1:22
2.	"You Love That"	DJ Junkaz Lou	2:25
3.	"Cow-Boy Howdy" (featuring Big Sche Eastwood)	DJ Junkaz Lou	3:39
4.	"New York"	DJ Junkaz Lou	4:35
5.	"Vacation Spot"	DJ Junkaz Lou	3:41
6.	"Supremacy"	DJ Junkaz Lou	4:16
7.	"Impressions" (featuring Keith Murray)	DJ Junkaz Lou	3:50
8.	"The Game is Free" (featuring Megabone)	DJ Junkaz Lou	5:12
9.	"Who's the Man"	DJ Junkaz Lou	3:28
10.	"Pull Your Hat Down" (featuring Big Sche Eastwood)	Big Sche Eastwood	3:49
11.	"Extra Thoughts" (featuring The I.M.O)	DJ Junkaz Lou	3:40
12.	"Something Special"	DJ Junkaz Lou	3:35
13.	"I Never Hurt You"	DJ Junkaz Lou	4:29
14.	"Lovin' Me" (featuring Big Sche Eastwood)	DJ Junkaz Lou	3:56
15.	"Goodbye Rap"	DJ Junkaz Lou	3:24
16.	"New York "Cartel" Remix" (featuring Agallah & NYM)	Ariel Caban
Total length:			55:21

== Personnel ==
- Keith Matthew Thornton – vocals, executive producer
- Louis Gomis – mixing, producer (tracks: 1–9, 11–15), executive producer
- Jeremie Kantorowicz – executive producer
- Mark A. Dokes – vocals (tracks: 3, 10, 14), producer (track 10)
- Ariel Caban – producer (track 16)
- Julianna – additional vocals (tracks: 1, 9)
- Keith Murray – vocals (track 7)
- Megabone – vocals (track 8)
- The I.M.O – vocals (track 11)
- Angel Aguilar – vocals (track 16)
- Sascha Stadlmeier – vocals (track 16)
- Lyass – piano (track 15)
- Joe Hernandez – recording
- Fabrice "the Lotion Man" Ho-Shui-Ling – mixing
- Hans-Philipp Graf – mastering
- Phil Emerson – layout, photography
