= Kool Keith =

American rapper and producer (born 1963)

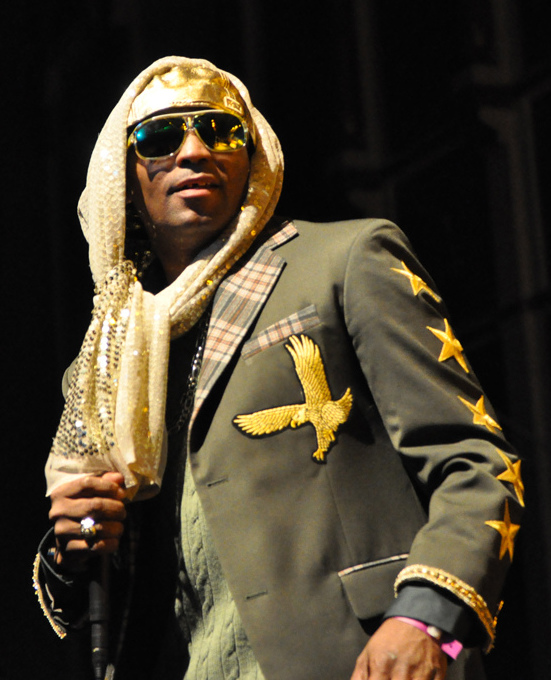
- Kool Keith performing in 2011

Background information
- Also known as: Dr. Octagon; Dr. Dooom; Black Elvis; Dr. Ultra; Crazy Lou; Robbie Analog; Poppa Large; Rhythm X; Keith Korg; Dicky Long Docking; Platinum Rich; Underwear Pissy; Number One Producer; Exotron Geiger Counter One Gamma Plus Sequencer
- Born: Keith Matthew Thornton; October 7, 1963 (age 62); New York City, U.S.
- Genre: Hip-hop
- Occupations: Rapper; producer; songwriter
- Works: Kool Keith discography
- Years active: 1984–present
- Labels: Bulk; Funky Ass; Ruffhouse; Columbia; Threshold; DMAFT; Insomniac; OCD International; Junkadelic; Mello
- Member of: Ultramagnetic MCs
- Website: Kool Keith on X

Signature
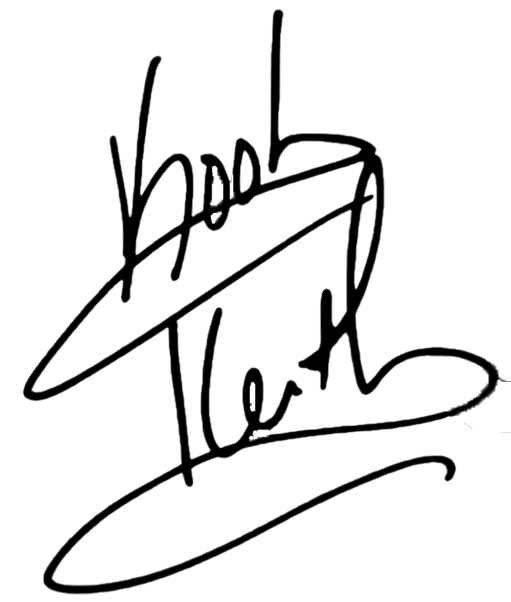

Keith Matthew Thornton (born October 7, 1963), better known by his stage name Kool Keith, is an American rapper and record producer known for his surreal, abstract, and often profane or incomprehensible lyrics. Kool Keith has recorded prolifically both as a solo artist and in group collaborations. Kool Keith is generally considered to be one of hip-hop's most eccentric and unusual personalities.

Kool Keith was a cofounding member of Ultramagnetic MCs, whose debut album Critical Beatdown was released in 1988. After two more albums with the group, Funk Your Head Up and The Four Horsemen, Kool Keith released his critically acclaimed solo debut album, Dr. Octagonecologyst, under the name Dr. Octagon in 1996. Subsequently, he independently released a series of further hip-hop albums, including Sex Style, First Come, First Served (as Dr. Dooom), Black Elvis/Lost in Space, and most recently Karpenters.

After releasing only one album on a major label, Black Elvis/Lost in Space, Kool Keith subsequently returned to independently releasing music, producing further efforts as a solo artist and in collaboration with groups such as Analog Brothers, Masters of Illusion, Thee Undatakerz and Project Polaroid. Kool Keith has also made guest appearances in collaboration with Peeping Tom and Yeah Yeah Yeahs. He was also featured on the short track DDT on Jurassic 5's album Power in Numbers. The Prodigy's hit "Smack My Bitch Up" was based on a sample of Kool Keith's voice saying "Change my pitch up, smack my bitch up" on Give the Drummer Some by Ultramagnetic MCs.

== History ==
=== Ultramagnetic MCs (1984–1993) ===
Thornton began his career with the group Ultramagnetic MCs under the pseudonym Kool Keith in 1984. Four years later, their release of the album Critical Beatdown was critically acclaimed and later became recognized as widely influential for its innovative production, complex rhymes, and chopped sampling. Just after its release, Thornton was reportedly institutionalized in Bellevue Hospital Center. However, he later said that the idea that he was institutionalized came from a flippant remark made during an interview, and he never expected the story to become so well known.

Ultramagnetic MCs would release two more albums (1992's Funk Your Head Up and 1993's The Four Horsemen) with little commercial success due to West Coast hip-hop's changing landscape. They went on hiatus for years, leading Thornton to embark on a solo career.

=== Dr. Octagon debuts (1995–1996) ===
Thornton released his first notable solo single, "Earth People", in 1995, under the name Dr. Octagon. This was followed by the release of the concept album Dr. Octagonecologyst the following year. The album's production by Dan the Automator and Kutmasta Kurt, with scratching by DJ Qbert was acclaimed by critics, and the album was released nationally by DreamWorks Records in 1997, after an initial release on the smaller Bulk Recordings label (as, simply, Dr. Octagon) a year prior. Dr. Octagonecologyst was considered a departure from old school hip-hop to abstract hip-hop, with surrealistic, horror, science-fiction, and sexual themes. DreamWorks also issued an instrumental version of the album, titled Instrumentalyst (Octagon Beats).

=== Further releases (1996–2001) ===
In 1996, Thornton collaborated with Tim Dog for the single "The Industry is Wack", performing under the name Ultra—the album Big Time soon followed. The following year, Thornton released the sophomore album, Sex Style, under the name Kool Keith. Thornton described this dirty rap concept album as "pornocore", filled with sexual metaphors to diss other rappers. An instrumental version was also released. This year, a collaborative album with Godfather Don titled Cenobites was released as an LP.

In 1999, he released the album First Come, First Served under the name Dr. Dooom, in which the album's main character killed off Dr. Octagon on the album's opening track. The same year, on August 10, 1999, Thornton released Black Elvis/Lost in Space, under the major record labels Ruffhouse and Columbia. It peaked at Number 10 on the Billboard Heatseekers chart, Number 74 on the Top R&B/Hip-Hop Albums chart, and Number 180 on the Billboard 200, Despite standing out as Thornton's most commercially successful project to date, he was disappointed with the album's delays and promotional efforts, even though a promotional video was made for the lead single, "Livin' Astro", which aired on a few episodes of the MTV show Amp in early 2000. Its sequel, Black Elvis 2, was released in 2023.

On June 5, 2001, Thornton released the album Spankmaster on TVT and Gothom Records. It peaked at Number 16 on the Billboard Heatseekers chart, Number 11 on the Top Independent Albums chart and Number 48 on the Top R&B/Hip-Hop Albums chart. The album has yet to be on streaming.

=== Collaborations (2000–2004) ===
On July 25, 2000, Thornton released the album Matthew. It peaked at Number 47 on the Billboard Heatseekers chart. The following month, Thornton collaborated with Ice-T, Marc Live, Black Silver and Pimp Rex for the album Pimp to Eat, under the group name Analog Brothers, with Keith performing as Keith Korg and Ice-T as Ice Oscillator. The album was re-released by Mello Music Group on streaming, CD, and LP in 2016. Masters of Illusion, a collaboration with KutMasta Kurt and Motion Man, followed a few months later.

Thornton, Marc Live and H-Bomb formed the group KHM, releasing the album Game on November 19, 2002. They later changed their name to "Clayborne Family" by the release of their second album two years later. That year (2004) also saw the release of Kool Keith Presents Thee Undatakerz (with Reverend Tom (Kool Keith) Al Bury-U (BIG NONAME), M-Balmer and The Funeral Director) and Diesel Truckers, another collaboration with KutMasta Kurt.

=== Second Dr. Octagon album (2002–2004) ===
In 2002, Thornton began recording The Resurrection of Dr. Octagon with producer Fanatik J, signing a contract with CMH Records to release the album, which was eventually completed without much input from Thornton, due to a falling out over contractual terms.

On October 12, 2004, Real Talk Entertainment issued the album Dr. Octagon Part 2. The album was discontinued by court order. On June 27, The Return of Dr. Octagon was released by OCD International, an imprint of CMH, advertised as the official follow-up to Dr. Octagonecologyst. Some critics felt that it was not as good as its predecessor. Thornton stated that he liked the album, but felt that it hurt his reputation as a musician. In August, Thornton performed under the Dr. Octagon billing, but did not acknowledge the release of the OCD album.

=== Further collaborations and solo albums (2006–present) ===
On April 25, 2006, Thornton released the album Nogatco Rd. under the name Mr. Nogatco, and Project Polaroid, a collaboration with TomC3. The Return of Dr. Octagon, the sequel to Dr. Octagonecologyst, was released two months later, as well as a Dr. Dooom sequel titled Dr. Dooom 2 being released two years later.

In 2007, Ultramagnetic MCs released the reunion album The Best Kept Secret. In 2009, Kool Keith released the concept album Tashan Dorrsett; a follow-up, The Legend of Tashan Dorrsett, followed two years later. In 2012, Kool Keith performed at the Gathering of the Juggalos. He has stated that he is considering retiring from music. In 2013, Keith appeared as Dr. Octagon on the Yeah Yeah Yeahs song "Buried Alive", from their album Mosquito. In 2015, Keith released "Time? Astonishing!" with producer L'Orange and began the start of his relationship with Mello Music Group. Since then, Keith also re-issued his group album with the Analog Brothers (Ice-T, Pimp Rex, Marc Live, Silver Synth) Pimp To Eat with Mello Music. Kool Keith's recent solo album Feature Magnetic was dropped on September 16, 2016, and it features MF Doom, Slug from Atmosphere, Dirt Nasty and many others. Artwork for the Feature Magnetic album was produced by Marc Santo.

In 2018, Keith collaborated once again with Dan the Automator and DJ Qbert for another Dr. Octagon album. Moosebumps: An Exploration Into Modern Day Horripilation was released on streaming services on April 6, 2018, with the physical release scheduled for Record Store Day, April 21, 2018. The Record Store Day release includes both vinyl and CD copies. Using his Deltron persona, Del the Funky Homosapien guests on "3030 Meets the Doc, Pt. 1". NPR offered a first look at the album on March 29, 2018. Kool Keith appears on "Western" by the bluegrass-rap group Gangstagrass, performing as himself. Throughout five years, Thornton released Controller of Trap, Keith, Computer Technology, Saks 5th Ave, Space Goretex (with Thetan), Keith's Salon, Subatomic (with Del the Funky Homosapien), Serpent (with Real Bad Man), and Black Elvis 2.

Thornton's fan site refers to his discography of roughly fifty album releases, most of which have been commercially released. Singles such as "Spectrum" continue to appear online under the artist's name, on sites such as SoundCloud and Spotify.

== Lyrical and performance style ==
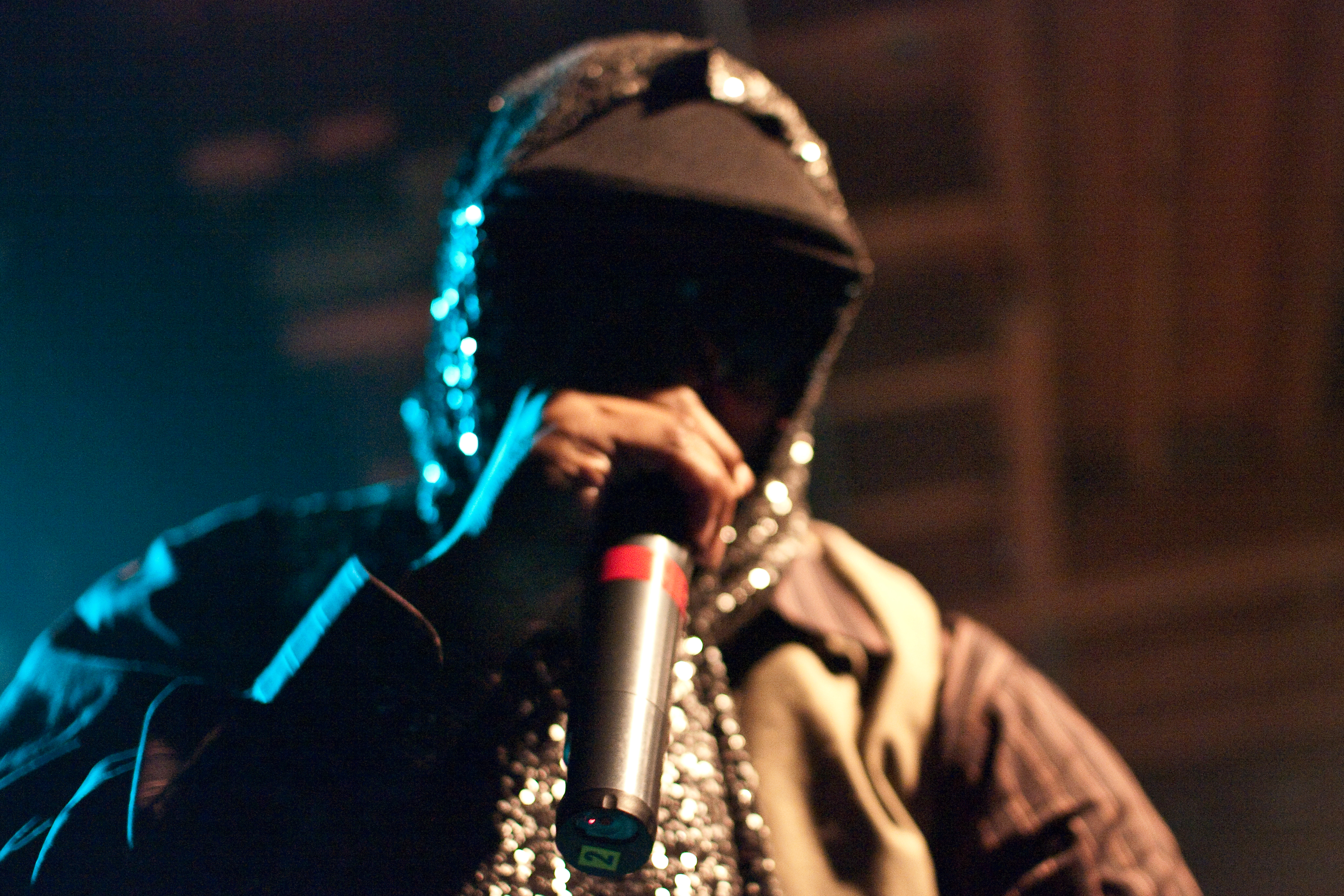
Kool Keith performing at Mezzanine in San Francisco, California during the 2009 Noise Pop Festival

Thornton's lyrics are often abstract, surreal, and filled with non-sequiturs, extreme violence, exaggerated braggadocio, and profane shock humor. Thornton is also known for an explicit style focusing on sexual themes, which he has referred to as "pornocore". In a 2007 interview, he claimed to have "invented horrorcore".

== Alter egos ==
Kool Keith is known for his many alter egos. As of 2012, Kool Keith had at least 58 such alter egos: these include well-known aliases such as Dr. Octagon, Dr. Dooom, and Black Elvis, which appeared on albums bearing their names; and the more obscure, such as firearms dealer "Crazy Lou" and "Exotron Geiger Counter One Gamma Plus Sequencer," as he introduced himself in an appearance on Marley Marl's radio show In Control. Some of Kool Keith's monikers have only existed on album artwork, such as "Mr. Green" and "Elvin Presley."

In reference to his relationship between himself and his various stage personalities, Keith has said, "I don't even feel like I'm a human being anymore".

== Discography ==
Solo albums

- Dr. Octagonecologyst (1996)
- Sex Style (1997)
- First Come, First Served (1999)
- Black Elvis/Lost in Space (1999)
- Matthew (2000)
- Spankmaster (2001)
- Nogatco Rd. (2006)
- The Return of Dr. Octagon (2006)
- Dr. Dooom 2 (2008)
- Tashan Dorrsett (2009)
- Love and Danger (2012)
- Demolition Crash (2014)
- El Dorado Driven (2014)
- Feature Magnetic (2016)
- Moosebumps: An Exploration Into Modern Day Horripilation (2018)
- Controller of Trap (2018)
- Keith (2019)
- Computer Technology (2019)
- Saks 5th Ave (2019)
- Keith's Salon (2021)
- Black Elvis 2 (2023)
- Mr. Controller (2023)
- World Area (2023)
- Karpenters (2025)

Collaborative albums

- Big Time (with Tim Dog as Ultra) (1996)
- The Cenobites (with Godfather Don as The Cenobites) (1997)
- Pimp to Eat (with Ice-T, Black Silver, Marc Live and Pimpin' Rex as Analog Brothers) (2000)
- A Much Better Tomorrow (with Dan The Automator) (2000)
- Masters of Illusion (with KutMasta Kurt and Motion Man as Masters of Illusion) (2000)
- Game (with Jacky Jasper and Marc Live as KHM) (2002)
- Kool Keith Presents Thee Undatakerz (with M-Balmer, The Funeral Director and Al Bury-U as Thee Undatakerz) (2004)
- Kool Keith Official Space Tape (with DJ Junkaz Lou) (2004)
- Diesel Truckers (with KutMasta Kurt as The Diesel Truckers) (2004)
- Clayborne Family (with Jacky Jasper and Marc Live as Clayborne Family) (2004)
- The Original SoundTrack Album of Project Polaroid (with TomC3 as Project Polaroid) (2006)
- Idea of a Masterpiece (with 57–41) (2009)
- Bikinis N Thongs (with Denis Deft) (2009)
- Stoned (with H-Bomb as 7th Veil) (2009)
- Magnetic Pimp Force Field (with Big Sche Eastwood) (2013)
- Time? Astonishing! (with L'Orange) (2015)
- A Couple of Slices (with Ray West) (2015)
- Moosebumps: An Exploration Into Modern Day Horripilation The SP 1200 Remixes (with Dan The Automator) (2018)
- The Foundation Album (2019)
- Space Goretex (with Thetan) (2020)
- Subatomic (with Del the Funky Homosapien as FNKPMPN) (2022)
- Serpent (with Real Bad Man) (2023)
- Aponia (with Awol One) (2024)
- Bandoleros (with Lynx 196.9 and Arturo Banbini) (2024)
- Galaxy Thot (with Dear Derrick) (2025)
- The Yoohoo Bros (with Dane Uno) (2025)
