= Tashan Dorrsett =

Studio album by Kool Keith
- Released: February 24, 2009
- Studio: Innovative Music Studios (New York City, New York); Mr Sche's Dungeon (Memphis, Tennessee); Junkadelic Studio (Paris, France); Mystery Sound Studio (New York City, New York)
- Genre: East Coast hip-hop; underground hip-hop
- Length: 1:16:41
- Label: Junkadelic Music
- Producer: Kool Keith (exec.); DJ Junkaz Lou; Hustlers Corner

Kool Keith chronology
Dr. Dooom 2 (2008)	Tashan Dorrsett (2009)	Love and Danger (2012)

Kool Keith Presents Tashan Dorrsett is the tenth solo studio album by American rapper and producer Kool Keith, and his debut release under his 'Tashan Dorrsett' alias. It was dropped on February 24, 2009, via Junkadelic Music, making it the rapper's first release on the label. The album featured guest appearances from Ced-Gee, Marc Live, Champ, D.Eazy, and Dgiz. The concept of the album was, in Keith's words, a reality show in which the street-smart, down-to-earth Tashan was the star. The album was produced by Junkaz Lou, who previously worked with Keith on the Official Space Tape and Collabs Tape.

A remix album titled The Legend of Tashan Dorrsett was released on May 3, 2011. Tashan Dorrsett returned with The Preacher on July 29, 2016.

== Track listing ==
No.	Title	Producer(s)	Length
1.	"Intro"	DJ Junkaz Lou	3:00
2.	"Supa Supreme"	DJ Junkaz Lou	2:58
3.	"Above Sea Level"	DJ Junkaz Lou	3:42
4.	"Flow Smooth"	DJ Junkaz Lou	3:53
5.	"Glamour Life"	DJ Junkaz Lou	3:36
6.	"La Chacha"	DJ Junkaz Lou	4:26
7.	"Magnetic Junkadelic" (featuring Ced Gee & D.Eazy)	Hustlers Corner	3:50
8.	"The Real Beginer"	DJ Junkaz Lou	2:49
9.	"Tashan..."	DJ Junkaz Lou	3:29
10.	"Booty Clap"	DJ Junkaz Lou	5:32
11.	"We Turn" (Skit)	DJ Junkaz Lou	1:10
12.	"Black Lagoon"	DJ Junkaz Lou	3:36
13.	"New Shhhiiit" (featuring Champ)	DJ Junkaz Lou	3:31
14.	"Indian"	DJ Junkaz Lou	3:42
15.	"Track Runner" (featuring Dgiz & Marc Live)	DJ Junkaz Lou	4:04
16.	"Industry"	DJ Junkaz Lou	4:39
17.	"Zapp"	DJ Junkaz Lou	3:16
Total length:			1:07:50

Bonus tracks
No.	Title	Producer(s)	Length
18.	"Magnetic Junkadelic (Junkadelic Remix)" (featuring Ced Gee & D.Eazy)	DJ Junkaz Lou	3:37
19.	"Supa Supreme (Larry Hutch Remix)"	DJ Junkaz Lou	3:14
20.	"Booty Clap (Remix)" (featuring Big Sche Eastwood)	DJ Junkaz Lou	5:16
21.	"Flow Smooth (KutMasta Kurt Remix)"	DJ Junkaz Lou	3:36
22.	"Untitled" (DVD)		26:40

== Personnel ==
- Big D - additional vocals (track 14)
- Cedric Ulmont Miller - featured artist (tracks 7, 18)
- Champ - featured artist (track 13)
- D.Eazy - featured artist (tracks 7, 18)
- Darlee - additional vocals (track 10)
- DJ Netik - scratches (track 2)
- El Noor - additional vocals (track 14)
- Fabrice "Lotion Man" Ho-Shui Ling - recording (track 10), mixing (tracks 1–19)
- Hustlers Corner - production (track 7)
- Joe Hernandez - recording (tracks 1–9, 11–18)
- Karim "Dgiz" Ghizellaoui - featured artist (track 15)
- "Kool" Keith Matthew Thornton - executive production, lyrics, main performer
- "Kut Masta" Kurt Matlin - recording and mixing (track 21)
- Larry Hutch - mixing (tracks 1–19)
- Louis "DJ Junkaz Lou" Gomis - arranging, production (tracks 1–6, 8–21), scratches (tracks 1, 3–21), executive production
- Mark A. "Mr. Sche" Dokes - mastering, recording and mixing (track 20)
- Marc "Marc Live" Giveand - featured artist (track 15)
- Nator - project coordinator, photographer, executive production
- Pat - guitar (track 8)
- Shoet - artwork
