= Nogatco Rd. =

Studio album by Mr. Nogatco
- Released: April 25, 2006
- Genre: Underground hip-hop
- Length: 43:32
- Label: Insomniac Records
- Producers: Israel "Iz Real" Vasquetelle (also exec.); Broken Klutch; Mister Hill; Carl Kavorkian; DiViNCi; EDK; Jahson; D. Watcher

Kool Keith chronology
Clayborne Family (2004)	Nogatco Rd. (2006)	Project Polaroid (2006)

Professional ratings
Review scores
Source	Rating
AllMusic	3/5 stars
RapReviews	8.5/10 stars

Nogatco Rd is the seventh solo studio album by American rapper Kool Keith and his first release under his 'Mr. Nogatco' alter-ego. It was released on April 25, 2006, via Insomniac Inc. The album featured guest appearances from Sole and Sage Francis.

== Track listing ==
No.	Title	Producer(s)	Length
1.	"No Head At All"	Iz-Real; DiViNCi (co.)	1:00
2.	"Bionic Fuse"	D. Watcher	3:02
3.	"Night Flyer (Force Field)"	Mr. Hill	3:43
4.	"Dark Space"	Broken Klutch	4:31
5.	"Hello Space Man" (Interlude)	Iz-Real	0:22
6.	"Celestial"	Jahson; DiViNCi (co.)	4:22
7.	"Alpha Omega (The Beginning)"	Mr. Hill	3:30
8.	"Big Adventure"	Carl Kavorkian	3:16
9.	"Black 37"	Carl Kavorkian	3:45
10.	"Capture (Back To Me)"	D. Watcher	3:49
11.	"Different"	Broken Klutch; EDK; DiViNCi (co.)	5:03
12.	"Live Dissection" (featuring Xaul Zan & Sole)	DiViNCi	7:02
13.	"Nogatco Rd." (Video)	Iz-Real	11:52
Total length:			43:32

Notes

Enhanced CD. Bonus material includes Nogatco Rd. film short, digital comic book panels, photos & sketches. The "Nogatco Rd." film includes videos for the following: "Bionic Fuse", "Dark Space", "Night Flyer (Force Field)".

== Personnel ==
- Aaron Gandia – engineer
- Adam Beyrer – engineer
- Anthony Torres – editor
- Bryan Moss – artwork
- C. "Carl Kavorkian" Milbourne – producer (tracks 8–9)
- DJ SPS – scratching (tracks 1–11)
- DJ Spytek – scratching (track 12)
- EDK – producer (track 11)
- Gabe Garton – editing assistant
- Gregory Titus – cover illustration
- Israel "Iz Real" Vasquetelle – arranger, concept, film director, film editor, executive producer, producer
- J. "Broken Klutch" Prenelus – producer (tracks 4, 11)
- J. "Jahson" Grimes – producer (track 6)
- James Timothy Holland Jr. – guest vocals (track 12)
- Jason Laughton – engineer
- Keith Matthew Thornton – primary artist
- Paul William Francis – guest vocals (track 12)
- Paul ZSadie – authoring
- Robert Koelble – guitar (track 8)
- Sam Gaffin – model
- T. "Mister Hill" Gumke – producer (tracks 3, 7)
