= Matthew (album) =

Studio album by Kool Keith
- Released: July 25, 2000
- Recorded: 2000
- Genre: Hardcore hip-hop; underground hip-hop
- Length: 52:32
- Label: Funky Ass Records
- Producer: Kool Keith; Kutmasta Kurt

Kool Keith chronology
Black Elvis/Lost in Space (1999)	Matthew (2000)	Pimp to Eat (2000)

Professional ratings
Review scores
Source	Rating
AllMusic	2/5 stars
RapReviews	5.5/10
The Encyclopedia of Popular Music	3/5 stars
The New Rolling Stone Album Guide	2.5/5 stars

Matthew is the fifth studio album by American rapper and producer Kool Keith. It was released on July 25, 2000, via Funky Ass Records. The entire record was produced by Kool Keith himself, except for track 16, produced by KutMasta Kurt, and it contains guest appearances by Freddie Foxxx and Black Silver. Matthew peaked at number 36 on the US Billboard Independent Albums and #47 on the Heatseekers Albums.

== Track listing ==
No.	Title	Producer(s)	Length
1.	"F-U M.F."	Kool Keith	2:50
2.	"27 Shots"	Kool Keith	3:18
3.	"Errand Boy" (Skit)	Kool Keith	0:51
4.	"Operation Extortion"	Kool Keith	3:13
5.	"Baddest M.C."	Kool Keith	3:10
6.	"Extravagant Traveler"	Kool Keith	3:46
7.	"Recoupment" (Skit)	Kool Keith	1:04
8.	"I Don't Believe You"	Kool Keith	3:03
9.	"Lived In The Projects"	Kool Keith	3:00
10.	"Keith N Bumpy" (featuring Bumpy Knuckles)	Kool Keith	3:26
11.	"The Set Up" (Skit)	Kool Keith	0:32
12.	"Shoes N Suits"	Kool Keith	3:52
13.	"Diamonds"	Kool Keith	3:48
14.	"Sweet Unique Pete" (featuring Black Silver)	Kool Keith	2:54
15.	"Do You Masturbate?" (Skit)	Kool Keith	0:31
16.	"Back Stage Passes"	Kut Masta Kurt	3:19
17.	"Mad Man Departure"	Kool Keith	2:25
Total length:			52:32

== Personnel ==
- Keith Thornton – main performer, producer (tracks: 1–15, 17), executive producer
- Kurt Matlin – producer (track 16), project coordinator
- James F. Campbell – guest performer (track 10)
- Christopher Rodgers – guest performer (track 14)

== Charts ==
Chart (2013)	Peak position
US Independent Albums (Billboard)	36
US Heatseekers Albums (Billboard)	47
