= Keith (album) =

2019 studio album by Kool Keith

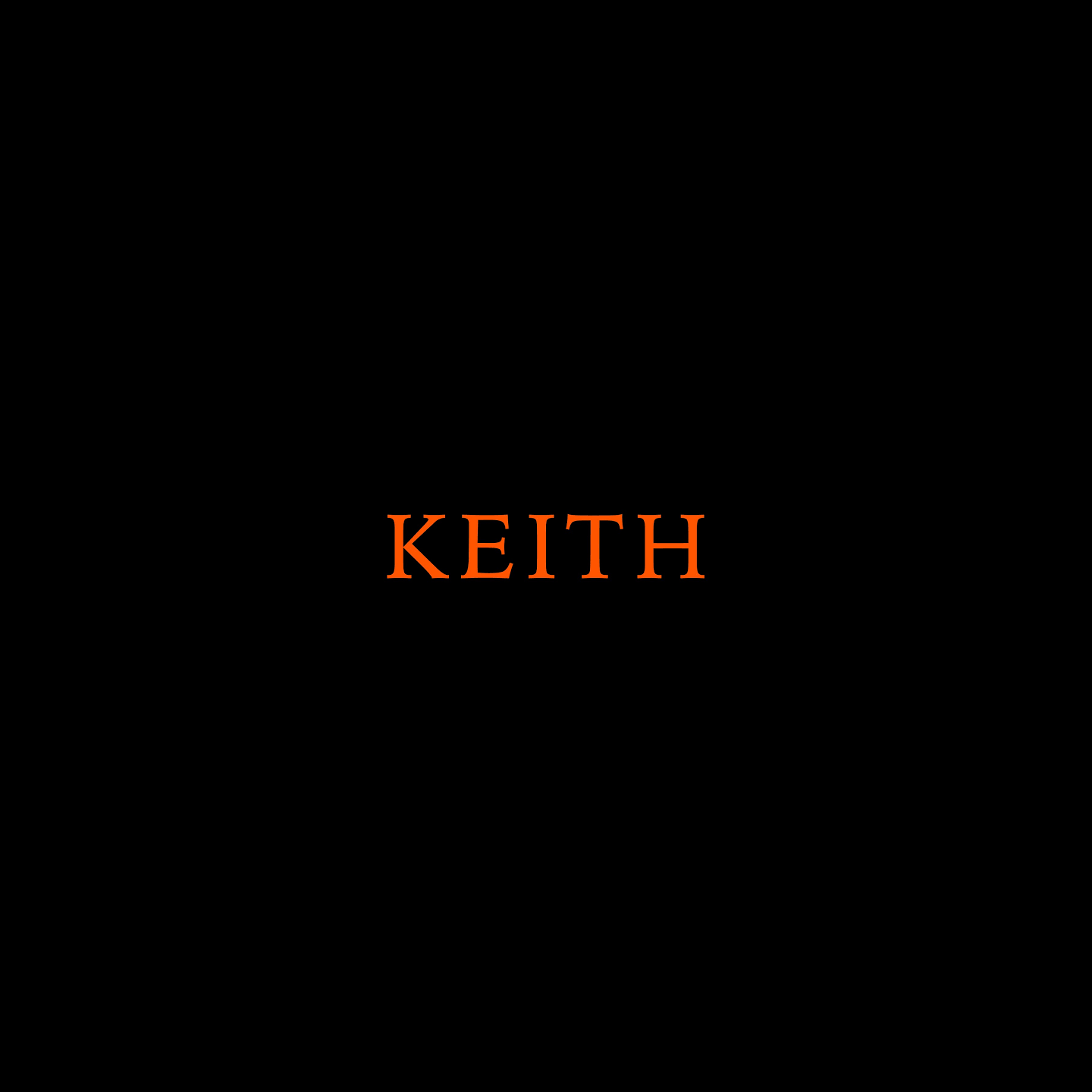

Studio album by Kool Keith
- Released: July 12, 2019
- Studio: TME Studios (The Bronx, NY)
- Genre: Alternative hip-hop
- Length: 44:08
- Label: Mello Music Group
- Producer: Psycho Les

Kool Keith chronology
Controller of Trap (2018)	Keith (2019)	Computer Technology (2019)

Singles from Keith
- 1. "Zero Fux" Released: May 14, 2019; 2. "Turn the Levels" Released: June 4, 2019

Keith (stylized in all caps) is the seventeenth solo studio album by American recording artist Kool Keith. It was released on July 12, 2019 through Mello Music Group. The album was produced by Psycho Les of the Beatnuts. It features guest appearances from fellow rappers B-Real, Jeru the Damaja and Paul Wall. The album was recorded at TME Studios in the Bronx and mixed by DJ Fred Ones.

== Singles ==
The album's lead single, "Zero Fux" was released on May 14, 2019. It features Cypress Hill member B-Real. The second single, "Turn the Levels", was released on June 4, 2019.

== Critical reception ==
Professional ratings
Review scores
Source	Rating
AllMusic	3.5/5 stars
The Arts Desk	3/5 stars
RapReviews	7/10

Keith was met with mostly positive reviews. Paul Simpson of AllMusic writes, "Keith is simply another consistent, enjoyable album from one of rap's true legends". Guy Oddy of The Arts Desk writes, "a lyrical and beat collage that takes in social reportage on the menacing "95 South", anti-materialism on "Word Life" and racism, it also has a good deal of bragging about his prowess on the mic."

== Track listing ==
Credits adapted from Pitchfork.

No.	Title	Writer(s)	Producer(s)	Length
1.	"Intro"	Keith Thornton		1:04
2.	"Foot Locker" (featuring Paul Wall)	Thornton; Paul Slayton	Psycho Les	3:01
3.	"95 South" (featuring Psycho Les)	Thornton; Lester Fernandez	Psycho Les	3:15
4.	"Graceland"	Thornton	Psycho Les	3:07
5.	"Holy Water"	Thornton	Psycho Les	3:03
6.	"Makem Crazy"	Thornton	Psycho Les	3:51
7.	"Muscle Block"	Thornton	Psycho Les	3:00
8.	"Open and Wet"	Thornton	Psycho Les	3:25
9.	"Plush Mink"	Thornton	Psycho Les	3:46
10.	"Slave Owner"	Thornton	Psycho Les	3:11
11.	"She Answer" (featuring Jeru the Damaja)	Thornton; Kendrick Davis	Psycho Les	3:00
12.	"Turn the Levels"	Thornton	Psycho Les	3:31
13.	"Word Life"	Thornton	Psycho Les	4:12
14.	"Zero Fux" (featuring B-Real)	Thornton; Louis Freese	Psycho Les	2:52
Total length:				44:08

=== Sample credits ===
- "Turn the Levels" contains a sample of "Suspended Underscore", performed by Keith Mansfield.
- "Holy Water" contains a replayed sample of "I'm Gonna Love You Just a Little More Baby", performed by Barry White, from the album I've Got So Much to Give.
