= Black Elvis/Lost in Space =

Studio album by Kool Keith
- Released: August 10, 1999
- Recorded: 1998–1999
- Studio: Bridge (Conshohocken, Pennsylvania)
- Genre: Underground hip-hop
- Length: 68:04
- Label: Ruffhouse; Columbia; SME
- Producer: Kool Keith; Nightcrawler (co.)

Kool Keith chronology
First Come, First Served (1999)	Black Elvis/Lost in Space (1999)	Matthew (2000)

Professional ratings
Review scores
Source	Rating
AllMusic	4/5 stars
Robert Christgau	(2-star Honorable Mention)

Black Elvis/Lost in Space is the fourth solo studio album by American rapper and producer Kool Keith, and his first release under the alias of 'Black Elvis'. It was intended to be released the same day as First Come, First Served, but was pushed back by Columbia Records and ended up being released four months later on August 10, 1999, through Relativity Entertainment Distribution rather than Sony Music Distribution, denoted by the WK prefix instead of the customary CK prefix and the legal copy on the release. Black Elvis 2 followed in 2023.

== Background ==
Kool Keith uses very complex rhymes on various subject matters from Black Elvis' viewpoint on half of the album and on the other half elaborates on space travel and being lost in space. This is the first album for which Keith handled all of the production, although drum programming was done by Kutmasta Kurt and Marc Live. Sadat X, Black Silver, Roger Troutman, Motion Man, Kid Capri and Pimpin' Rex made guest appearances on the record.

A promotional video was made for the track "Livin' Astro" which aired on a few episodes of the MTV show Amp in early 2000. The video features Kool Keith acting as several different personas amidst a sci-fi backdrop that resembles the Black Elvis/Lost in Space album cover. The personas include the Original Black Elvis, Orange Man, the Kid in the Commercial, Lonnie Hendrex, and Light-Blue Cop.

Kool Keith was displeased with the lack of promotion for the Black Elvis project, and vented his frustrations about his label on the songs "Release Date" and "Test Press." He also published the e-mail addresses of several Ruffhouse executives, asking his fans to demand better promotion.

== Reception ==
The album peaked at number 180 on the US Billboard 200, #74 on the Top R&B/Hip-Hop Albums, #10 on the Heatseekers Albums.

== Track listing ==
No.	Title	Length
1.	"Intro" (featuring Black Silver & Pimpin' Rex)	3:09
2.	"Lost in Space" (featuring Black Silver)	3:52
3.	"Rockets on the Battlefield"	4:24
4.	"Livin' Astro"	4:28
5.	"Supergalactic Lover"	3:40
6.	"Master of the Game" (featuring Roger Troutman)	4:43
7.	"I'm Seein' Robots"	4:22
8.	"Static" (featuring Sadat X)	4:31
9.	"Intro 2" (featuring Kid Capri)	0:25
10.	"Black Elvis"	3:45
11.	"Maxi Curls"	4:36
12.	"Keith Turbo"	4:17
13.	"Fine Girls"	3:59
14.	"The Girls Don't Like the Job"	4:16
15.	"Clifton" (featuring Motion Man)	4:49
16.	"All the Time"	3:43
17.	"I Don't Play"	5:05
Total length:		1:08:04

Sample credits

- Track 5 contains elements from "Come Go With Me" by Teddy Pendergrass (1979)
- Track 8 contains elements from "Our House" by Madness (1982)
- Track 11 contains elements from "Snake" by Charles Earland (1973)
- Track 16 contains elements from "You Used to Love Me" by Faith Evans (1995)

== Personnel ==
- Keith Matthew Thornton - vocals, lyrics, producer, executive producer
- Jeremy Larner - executive producer, management
- Nightcrawler - drum programming & co-producer (tracks: 5, 11, 15), programming (tracks: 3, 4, 6, 7, 10, 14)
- Live 7 - programming (tracks: 1, 2, 8, 9, 12, 13, 16, 17)
- Kurt Matlin - lyrics (tracks: 5, 11, 15)
- Paul K. Laster - vocals & lyrics (track 15)
- Manny Lecuona - mastering
- Michael 'Bones' Malak - recording
- Joseph Mario Nicolo - mixing
- Richard C Essig - lacquer cut
- Aimée MacAuley - art direction & design
- F. Scott Schafer - photography
- Estée Ochoa - design
- Tim Devine - A&R
- Christopher Rodgers - vocals (tracks: 1, 2)
- Rex Colonel Doby Jr. - vocals (track 1)
- Roger Troutman - vocals (track 6)
- Derek Murphy - vocals (track 8)
- David Anthony Love Jr. - vocals (track 9)

== Charts ==
Chart (1999)	Peak position
US Billboard 200	180
US Top R&B/Hip-Hop Albums (Billboard)	74
US Heatseekers Albums (Billboard)	10
