= Big Time (Ultra album) =

Studio album by Ultra
- Released: October 10, 1996
- Recorded: 1996
- Studio: Krackhous (Hollywood, CA)
- Genre: Hip-hop
- Length: 47:07
- Label: Our Turn
- Producers: KutMasta Kurt; Pimpin' Rex; Kool Keith

Kool Keith chronology
Dr. Octagonecologyst (1996)	Big Time (1996)	Sex Style (1997)

Tim Dog chronology
Do or Die (1993)	Big Time (1996)	Immortal (2003)

Singles from Big Time
- 1. "Big Time" Released: September 24, 1996

Professional ratings
Review scores
Source	Rating
AllMusic	4/5 stars
The Source	3/5 stars

Big Time is the only album by Ultra, an American hip-hop group composed of Kool Keith and Tim Dog, who had previously collaborated as part of Ultramagnetic MCs. The duo only released one album, which contained many disses towards other rappers.

== Track listing ==
All lyrics are written by Kool Keith & Tim Dog.

No.	Title	Producer(s)	Length
1.	"Selling My DAT's" (Intro)	KutMasta Kurt	0:42
2.	"Super Luv"	KutMasta Kurt	3:09
3.	"NYC Street Corner Battle"	KutMasta Kurt	3:20
4.	"Big Time"	Pimpin' Rex	4:39
5.	"Bitin' My Space Shit" (Skit)	KutMasta Kurt	0:07
6.	"Get Off the Dick"	KutMasta Kurt	3:40
7.	"Who Rocks?"	KutMasta Kurt	3:35
8.	"Peeping Tom" (Skit)	KutMasta Kurt	0:15
9.	"Private Eyes"	Pimpin' Rex	3:24
10.	"The Industry is Wak"	KutMasta Kurt	4:19
11.	"Moving Out the Projects?" (Skit)	KutMasta Kurt	0:22
12.	"Keep It Real... Represent"	KutMasta Kurt	4:07
13.	"Ain't Nobody Happenin'" (featuring Motion Man)	KutMasta Kurt	4:37
14.	"Fat Lady"	Kool Keith	4:13
15.	"Visit to the Zoo" (Skit)	KutMasta Kurt	0:28
16.	"Bizarre"	KutMasta Kurt	3:02
17.	"No Face"	KutMasta Kurt	2:33
18.	"To the Real Ultra Fans" (Outro)	KutMasta Kurt	0:36
Total length:			47:07

== Personnel ==
- Timothy Blair – writer, performer, executive producer, A&R
- Keith Matthew Thornton – writer, performer, producer (track 14), A&R
- Eddie Pugh – executive producer
- Kurt Matlin – producer (tracks: 1–3, 5–8, 10–13, 15–18)
- Rex Colonel Doby Jr. – producer (tracks: 4, 9)
- Paul Laster – performer (track 13)
- Tom Baker – mastering
- Junior – recording & mixing
- Jim Rasfeld – layout
- Scott Zuschin – photography
