= The Legend of Tashan Dorrsett =

Remix album by Kool Keith
- Released: April 5, 2011
- Genre: Hip hop
- Label: Junkadelic

Kool Keith chronology
Tashan Dorrsett (2009)	The Legend of Tashan Dorrsett (2011)

The Legend of Tashan Dorrsett is a remix album made by rapper Kool Keith. It was released on April 5, 2011 under the label Junkadelic.

== Track listing ==
1. "The Legend Of Tashan Dorrsett (Prelude)"
2. "New Shit (feat. Champ) [DJ Junkaz Lou Remix]"
3. "Supa Supreme (Marley Marl Remix)"
4. "Flow Smooth (feat. Ced Gee) [DJ Junkaz Lou Remix]"
5. "The Real Beginner (feat. Chem) [Ariel 'The Cartel' Caban Remix]"
6. "Above The Sea Level (Agallah Remix)"
7. "Tashan Dorrsett... (Domingo Remix)"
8. "Track Runner (feat. Marc Live, Raaddrr Van & Tr Love) [Tr Love Remix]"
9. "Glamour Life (feat. Marc Live) [DJ Junkaz Lou Remix]"
10. "Booty Clap (feat. Big Sche Eastwood) [Mr. Sche Remix]"
11. "Black Lagoon (Domingo Remix)"
12. "Magnetic Junkadelic (DJ Junkaz Lou Remix)"
