= Black Elvis 2 =

Studio album by Kool Keith
- Released: June 16, 2023
- Studio: Beloved Music Studios at TME PRO
- Genre: Hip-hop
- Length: 50:21
- Label: Mello Music Group
- Producers: J. Stylez; Kool Keith; L'Orange; Marc Live; Raaddrr Van

Kool Keith chronology
Serpent (2023)	Black Elvis 2 (2023)	Mr. Controller (2023)

Black Elvis 2 is the 21st solo studio album by American hip-hop musician Kool Keith. The concept album is a sequel to his 1999 Black Elvis/Lost in Space.

== Reception ==
Editors at AllMusic rated this album 4 out of 5 stars, with critic Paul Simpson writing that this album is "a little less chrome-plated than its predecessor", the experimental Black Elvis/Lost in Space, but it "is some of Keith's most successful work in ages, recapturing some of the magic of his '90s peak". The site included this on their list of favorite rap and hip-hop albums of 2023.

== Track listing ==
1. "Black Elvis 2 (intro)" – 1:08
2. "MAX" – 3:13
3. "E-L-V-I-S" – 3:05
4. "First Copy" – 3:24
5. "Kindergarten Adults" – 2:37
6. "The Formula" – 3:39
7. "Black Presley" – 3:14
8. "All Marvel" – 4:10
9. "Without My Culture" – 3:43
10. "Feelin' Me" – 2:56
11. "Love Infringement" – 2:48
12. "Space Mountain" – 3:06
13. "Road Dog" – 3:04
14. "Machinery" – 4:05
15. "World Spin" – 3:26
16. "Clifton's Revenge" – 2:34

== Personnel ==
- Kool Keith – rapping, production, executive production
- Agallah – rapping on "Road Dog"
- Dynamite – rapping on "Without My Culture"
- Austin Hart – album art
- Joe Hutcinson – mastering
- Ice-T – rapping on "The Formula"
- L'Orange – production
- Marc Live – rapping on "The Formula", "Space Mountain", and "Machinery"; production
- Erik Perry – executive production
- Photo Rob – photography
- STILO PRO Recording – mixing
- Michael Tolle – executive production
- Raaddrr Van – rapping on "Kindergarten Adults" and "Machinery", production

== See also ==
- 2023 in American music
- List of 2023 albums
