= First Come, First Served =

Studio album by Dr. Dooom
- Released: May 4, 1999
- Recorded: 1998–1999
- Studios: Threshold (Santa Monica, California)
- Genres: Hardcore hip-hop; horrorcore; underground hip-hop
- Length: 71:22
- Label: Funky Ass Records
- Producers: Kool Keith; KutMasta Kurt

Kool Keith chronology
Sex Style (1997)	First Come, First Served (1999)	Black Elvis/Lost in Space (1999)

First Come, First Served is the third solo studio album by American recording artist Kool Keith, and the first he released under the alias Dr. Dooom. It was released on May 4, 1999, by Funky Ass Records. The album featured guest appearances from Jacky Jasper and Motion Man, and was produced entirely by KutMasta Kurt and Kool Keith. It peaked at number 48 on the Heatseekers Albums.

== Music ==
=== Production ===
Production duties from the album were handled by KutMasta Kurt. AllMusic critic Steve Huey noted that the musical style of the album was an attempt to replicate the production style of Dr. Octagonecologyst.

=== Lyrical themes and storyline ===
The album's concept involves a serial killer named Dr. Dooom, who has a fondness for "cannibalism, pet rats, and Flintstones vitamins". The album opens with Dr. Dooom murdering Dr. Octagon. According to Steve Huey, this "[signals] Keith's desire to move away from the alternative audience who embraced that album and back to his roots in street-level hip-hop". The lyrical content is darker and more violent than that of Dr. Octagonecologyst. Huey states that the album's lyrics are "way too far out to fulfill Keith's aspirations; he simply doesn't fit into hip-hop's obsession with realism." The album's cover art was designed by Pen & Pixel Graphics as a parody of the covers they had previously created for No Limit Records releases, such as Silkk the Shocker's Charge It 2 Da Game.

== Reception ==
Professional ratings
Review scores
Source	Rating
AllMusic	4/5 stars
Robert Christgau	A−
The Source	3/5 stars

Critical response was mostly positive. Robert Christgau wrote that "No rapper has ever imagined such disgusting apartments—lurid locales with fluorescent cereal on the floor. More than all the 'body parts in shopping carts,' it's the decor that puts the 'fake gangsta hardcore stories' Dooom despises to shame." Huey wrote that "The second half loses a bit of focus as it gets away from the concept, but overall it's pretty consistent". Miguel Burke of The Source called it one of the weirdest albums of the year, which might not appeal to most hip-hop fans. "Humorous? Definitely. Original? For sure. Does it make sense? Only about as much as an ancient cave painting," concluded the journalist.

In 2008, a follow-up, Dr. Dooom 2, was produced in response to The Return of Dr. Octagon.

== Track listing ==
All music is composed by Kool Keith and KutMasta Kurt.

No.	Title	Length
1.	"Who Killed Dr. Octagon?" (Intro)	0:37
2.	"No Chorus"	2:26
3.	"Apartment 223"	4:54
4.	"Mr. Ratt" (Skit)	0:43
5.	"Neighbors Next Door" (featuring Jacky Jasper)	3:57
6.	"I Run Rap"	4:21
7.	"You Live at Home With Your Mom"	4:00
8.	"Housing Authority" (featuring Motion Man)	4:18
9.	"Wild Kingdom" (Skit)	0:23
10.	"Welfare Love"	3:44
11.	"Dr. Dooom's in the Room"	4:32
12.	"Call the Cops" (featuring Jacky Jasper)	4:16
13.	"Brothers Feel Fly"	3:52
14.	"Side Line"	4:23
15.	"Bitch Gets No Love"	2:58
16.	"Shopping List" (Skit)	0:22
17.	"Body Bag"	3:32
18.	"Mental Case"	3:48
19.	"Leave Me Alone"	5:03
20.	"Live / Bald Headed Girl"	9:13
Total length:		1:11:22

Notes

- Track 20 includes a hidden track, "Bald Headed Girl", which begins at 5:10 after a short period of silence.

== Personnel ==
- Keith Matthew Thornton – vocals, producer, executive producer
- Sean Merrick – vocals (tracks: 5, 12)
- Paul K. Laster – vocals (track 8)
- Kurt Matlin – producer, engineering, mixing
- Eddy Schreyer – mastering
- Gene Grimaldi – mastering
- Kenny "Tick" Salcido – additional engineering
- Pen & Pixel – artwork and design
