= Sex Style =

Studio album by Kool Keith
- Released: 1997
- Studio: The Glue Factory (San Francisco)
- Genre: Dirty rap
- Length: 53:51
- Label: Funky Ass
- Producer: KutMasta Kurt; TR Love

Kool Keith chronology
Big Time (1996)	Sex Style (1997)	First Come, First Served (1999)

Sex Style is an album by the American rapper Kool Keith. It was released in 1997 via Funky Ass Records and was produced by KutMasta Kurt and Keith's Ultramagnetic MCs' bandmate T.R. Love. It is a dirty rap concept album utilizing a lyrical style Keith referred to as "pornocore". Although the album did not chart, it was reissued in 2006 with a bonus track "Get Off My Elevator", which was featured in 1999 film Office Space soundtrack.

== Lyrics and music ==
Sex Style has been described as polarizing due to its lyrical style, which Kool Keith described as pornocore. The music was primarily written by producer Kutmasta Kurt. The production is noted for its deep, funky beats. Sex Style is described as a loose concept album.

The lyrics make frequent reference to sexual intercourse, with Kool Keith variously portraying himself as characters ranging from pimps to perverts. Keith also uses sexual metaphors to diss other rappers, many of which involve urolagnia.

== Reception ==
Professional ratings
Review scores
Source	Rating
AllMusic	3/5 stars

AllMusic reviewer Steve Huey wrote that Sex Style "is borderline necessary for Keith fans [...] it is a chance to hear one of the freakiest rappers of all time at his freakiest."

== Track listing ==
No.	Title	Writer(s)	Producer(s)	Length
1.	"Intro"	K. Thornton; K. Matlin	KutMasta Kurt	0:25
2.	"Sex Style"	K. Thornton; K. Matlin	KutMasta Kurt	3:23
3.	"Don't Crush It"	K. Thornton; K. Matlin	KutMasta Kurt	4:18
4.	"Make Up Your Mind"	K. Thornton; T. Randolph	T.R. Love	4:47
5.	"Sly We Fly" (featuring Motion Man)	K. Thornton; K. Matlin; P. Laster	KutMasta Kurt	4:16
6.	"Plastic World"	K. Thornton; K. Matlin	KutMasta Kurt	4:11
7.	"Stuck on Pussy Drive"	K. Thornton; K. Matlin	KutMasta Kurt	1:15
8.	"Regular Girl"	K. Thornton; K. Matlin	KutMasta Kurt	4:13
9.	"The Mack Is Back" (feat. Menelik)	K. Thornton; T. Randolph	T.R. Love	4:45
10.	"What's He Like?"	K. Thornton; K. Matlin	KutMasta Kurt	0:50
11.	"Still the Best"	K. Thornton; K. Matlin	KutMasta Kurt	4:05
12.	"In Your Face"	K. Thornton; T. Randolph	T.R. Love	3:54
13.	"Lick My Ass"	K. Thornton; K. Matlin	KutMasta Kurt	1:04
14.	"Keep It Real...Represent"	K. Thornton; K. Matlin	KutMasta Kurt	3:54
15.	"Little Girls"	K. Thornton; K. Matlin	KutMasta Kurt	3:08
16.	"After the Club"	K. Thornton; K. Matlin	KutMasta Kurt	0:50
17.	"Lovely Lady"	K. Thornton; K. Matlin	KutMasta Kurt	3:48
18.	"Can I See Your Panties, Girl?" (hidden track)	K. Thornton; K. Matlin	KutMasta Kurt	4:53
Total length:				59:06

2006 special edition bonus tracks
No.	Title	Writer(s)	Producer(s)	Length
18.	"Get Off My Elevator"	K. Thornton; K. Matlin	KutMasta Kurt	3:48
19.	"Yo Black" (hidden track)	K. Thornton; A. Best	Buckwild	4:29
Total length:				70:49

== Personnel ==
- Keith Matthew Thornton – vocals, executive producer
- Paul K. Laster – vocals (track 5)
- Rex Colonel Doby Jr. – mini-moog (tracks: 6, 11)
- Kurt Matlin – producer (tracks: 1–3, 5–8, 10, 11, 13–17)
- Trevor Randolph – producer (tracks: 4, 9, 12)
- Daniel M. Nakamura – mixing & recording
- Tom Baker – mastering
- Jim Rasfeld – graphics
