= Masters of Illusion (group) =

American hip hop group

Masters Of Illusion

Background information
- Genres: Alternative hip-hop; underground hip hop
- Years active: 1998-2001
- Label: Threshold Recordings
- Past members: KutMasta Kurt; Kool Keith; Motion Man

Masters of Illusion was the musical side project of producer KutMasta Kurt and rappers Kool Keith and Motion Man. Their debut self-titled album was released on November 14, 2000.

The album's title includes "Kutmasta Kurt presents..." which implies that Kutmasta Kurt brought the collaboration. Kurt had previously worked as a producer for several of Kool Keith's albums, many of which featured Motion Man on its tracks.

After the Masters of Illusion project, Kutmasta Kurt went on to produce Motion Man's debut album, Clearing the Field in 2002. In 2004, Kurt also released an album of his own, Redneck Games, and another collaborative album with Kool Keith as Diesel Truckers.

== Members ==
- Keith Matthew Thornton - rap vocals
- Paul K. Laster - rap vocals
- Kurt Matlin - producer

== Discography ==
=== Studio albums ===
- Masters of Illusion (2000)

=== Singles ===
- "Partnas Confused/Masters Of Illusion" (1998)
- "Partnas Confused/Magnum Be I" (1999)
- "We All Over/Souped Up" (2000)
- "The Bay-Bronx Bridge/Silk Suit, Black Linen" (2000)
- "Urban Legends/Let Me Talk To You" (2001)
