= Diesel Truckers =

Studio album by Kool Keith & KutMasta Kurt
- Released: August 10, 2004
- Recorded: 2004
- Genre: Alternative hip-hop; underground hip-hop
- Length: 58:11
- Label: DMAFT Records
- Producer: Carl Caprioglio (exec.); Jon Rosner (exec.); Platinum Rich (also exec.); Funky Redneck (also exec.)

Kool Keith chronology
| Kool Keith Presents Thee Undatakerz (2004) | Diesel Truckers (2004) | Clayborne Family (2004) |

Kutmasta Kurt chronology
| Dopestyle 1231 (2004) | Diesel Truckers (2004) | Redneck Olympics (2004) |

Singles from Diesel Truckers
- 1. "Break U Off/Takin' It Back" Released: 2004

Professional ratings
Review scores
| Source | Rating |
|---|---|
| AllMusic | 4/5 stars |

Diesel Truckers is a studio album by American hip-hop duo the Diesel Truckers, composed of New York–based rapper and producer Kool Keith and Californian DJ/producer KutMasta Kurt. It was released on August 10, 2004, via Dmaft Records and was produced by Keith and Kurt. The project spawned three singles: "Break U Off", "I Love You Nancy" and "Mental Side Effects", but neither the singles nor the album made it to any major charts. The song "Break U Off" was used in 2005 film The Longest Yard.

== Track listing ==
All music is composed by KutMasta Kurt and Kool Keith.

| No. | Title | Writer(s) | Length |
|---|---|---|---|
| 1. | "Diesel Truckers Theme" | K. Matlin; K. Thornton | 2:54 |
| 2. | "The Orchestrators" | M. Giveand; K. Matlin; K. Thornton | 3:14 |
| 3. | "Break U Off" | K. Thornton | 3:18 |
| 4. | "Takin' It Back" | K. Matlin; K. Thornton | 3:31 |
| 5. | "Mental Side Effects" (featuring FatHed & Jacky Jasper) | K. Matlin; S. Merrick; K. Thornton; R. Tiano | 4:24 |
| 6. | "I Love You Nancy" | K. Matlin; K. Thornton | 3:31 |
| 7. | "Diesel Truckin'" (featuring MC Dopestyle) | K. Matlin; C. Smith; K. Thornton | 3:57 |
| 8. | "The Legendary" | K. Matlin; K. Thornton | 3:24 |
| 9. | "Can I Buy U a Drink?" | K. Matlin; K. Thornton | 3:33 |
| 10. | "I Drop Money" | K. Matlin; K. Thornton | 3:23 |
| 11. | "Mane" | K. Matlin; K. Thornton | 3:25 |
| 12. | "Bamboozled" (featuring Jacky Jasper & Marc Live) | M. Giveand; K. Matlin; S. Merrick; K. Thornton | 3:58 |
| 13. | "Serve 'Em a Sentence" (featuring Motion Man) | P. Laster; K. Matlin; K. Thornton | 3:17 |
| 14. | "Kenworths With Wings" | K. Matlin; K. Thornton | 6:24 |
| 15. | "Game" (Bonus track) | C. Caprioglio; K. Matlin; K. Thornton | 5:58 |
| 16. | "Diesel Truckers Movie" (Video) |
| Total length: | | | 58:11 |

Sample credits

- "Takin' It Back" contains elements from "Sun Goddess" by Henry Mancini (1975)
- "Mane" contains elements from "Listen to the Bass of Get Stupid Fresh - Part II" by Mantronix (1986)

== Personnel ==
- Keith Matthew Thornton – main artist, vocals, producer, executive producer
- Kurt Matlin – main artist, producer, mixing, arranging, executive producer, project coordinator
- Carl Caprioglio – executive producer
- Jon Rosner – executive producer
- David Cheppa – mastering
- Scott Zuschin – photography
- Sean Merrick – featured artist (tracks: 5, 12)
- R. Tiano – featured artist (track 5)
- Chester Smith – featured artist (track 7)
- Marc Giveand – featured artist (track 12)
- Paul K. Laster – featured artist (track 13)
