= Dr. Dooom 2 =

Studio album by Dr. Dooom
- Released: September 23, 2008
- Genre: Hardcore hip-hop; underground hip-hop
- Length: 54:38
- Label: Threshold Recordings; Traffic Entertainment Group
- Producer: Kutmasta Kurt; TomC3

Kool Keith chronology
The Return of Dr. Octagon (2006)	Dr. Dooom 2 (2008)	Tashan Dorrsett (2009)

Professional ratings
Aggregate scores
Source	Rating
Metacritic	56/100
Review scores
Source	Rating
Pitchfork	(3.7/10)
PopMatters	6/10 stars
RapReviews	7/10 stars
Robert Christgau	(2-star Honorable Mention)

Dr. Dooom 2 is the ninth solo studio album by American rapper Kool Keith, and his second release under the Dr. Dooom moniker following First Come, First Served. It was released on September 23, 2008, via Threshold Recordings. The album was produced entirely by KutMasta Kurt, except for one song "God of Rap" produced by TomC3, and featured guest appearances from Motion Man, FatHed and Denis Deft.

== Lyrical themes ==
"Simon" refers to American Idol host Simon Cowell. According to Thornton, "I think for one guy to sit up and judge people and for him to be British at that—who the fuck is he to judge people? [...] What is Simon's qualifications?" "R.I.P. Dr. Octagon" was written in response to The Return of Dr. Octagon. According to KutMasta Kurt, "Without that album, we wouldn't have made this album. There would have been no need for Dr. Dooom to come back." "Step-N-Fetchers" focuses on African American entertainers who encourage and promote negative stereotypes. "Always Talkin' Out Your Ass" focuses on the music industry. Thornton states that "That song is about a lot of things: how people tend to do things expensive and then they do things cheap at the same time, so they have a contradicted lifestyle".

== Track listing ==
No.	Title	Producer(s)	Length
1.	"Simon"	KutMasta Kurt	2:45
2.	"The Countdown"	KutMasta Kurt	3:29
3.	"R.I.P. Dr. Octagon"	KutMasta Kurt	3:22
4.	"I'm Creepin'"	KutMasta Kurt	3:38
5.	"I Followed You"	KutMasta Kurt	3:13
6.	"Run For Your Life" (featuring Fathed)	KutMasta Kurt	3:52
7.	"Step N Fetchers"	KutMasta Kurt	2:56
8.	"How Sexy?" (featuring Denis Deft)	KutMasta Kurt	3:29
9.	"God Of Rap"	TomC3	4:01
10.	"That Girl Is A Monster"	KutMasta Kurt	3:13
11.	"Do Not Disturb"	KutMasta Kurt	3:38
12.	"Take That Ride"	KutMasta Kurt	3:03
13.	"Mopped Up"	KutMasta Kurt	3:14
14.	"Always Talkin' Out Your Ass"	KutMasta Kurt	3:53
15.	"Surgery" (featuring Motion Man)	KutMasta Kurt	4:20
Total length:			54:38

== Personnel ==
- Denis Martinez - guest vocals (track 8)
- Keith Matthew Thornton - main artist
- Kurt Matlin - mixing, arranger, songwriter, producer (tracks 1–8, 10–15) for Funky RedNeck Productions
- Mike Gilbert - artwork cover and layout design
- Paul Laster - guest vocals (track 15)
- R. Tiano - guest vocals (track 4)
- Thomas Cleary III - producer (track 9) for Lone Wolf Productions
- Volunteer Media - graphics
