= Moosebumps: An Exploration Into Modern Day Horripilation =

Studio album by Dr. Octagon
- Released: April 6, 2018
- Genre: Hip-hop
- Length: 49:16
- Label: Bulk Recordings
- Producer: Dan the Automator

Kool Keith chronology
Feature Magnetic (2016)	Moosebumps: An Exploration Into Modern Day Horripilation (2018)	Controller of Trap (2018)

Professional ratings
Aggregate scores
Source	Rating
AnyDecentMusic?	6.3/10
Metacritic	77/100
Review scores
Source	Rating
AllMusic	3.5/5 stars
The A.V. Club	B+
HipHopDX	4.3/5
Pitchfork	6.7/10
RapReviews	7/10

Moosebumps: An Exploration Into Modern Day Horripilation is the fifteenth solo studio album by American recording artist Kool Keith, who released the album under the alias Dr. Octagon. It was released on April 6, 2018 via Bulk Recordings. The set was produced by Dan "The Automator" Nakamura and featured the work of turntablist DJ Qbert.

== Track listing ==
No.	Title	Writer(s)	Length
1.	"Octagon Octagon"	K. Thornton; D. Nakamura	4:02
2.	"Polka Dots"	K. Thornton; D. Nakamura	4:37
3.	"Black Hole Son"	K. Thornton; D. Nakamura	2:53
4.	"Power of the World (S Curls)"	K. Thornton; D. Nakamura	4:31
5.	"Operation Zero"	K. Thornton; D. Nakamura	4:52
6.	"Bear Witness IV"	K. Thornton; D. Nakamura	4:30
7.	"Area 54"	K. Thornton; D. Nakamura	4:04
8.	"Flying Waterbed"	K. Thornton; D. Nakamura; P. Banks	3:40
9.	"3030 Meets the Doc (Pt. 1)" (featuring Deltron 3030)	K. Thornton; D. Nakamura; T. Jones	4:44
10.	"Karma Sutra"	K. Thornton; D. Nakamura	3:51
11.	"Hollywood Tailswinging"	K. Thornton; D. Nakamura	3:44
Total length:			49:16

Bonus Track
No.	Title	Writer(s)	Length
12.	"Aviator Hype"	K. Thornton; D. Nakamura	3:49

== Personnel ==
- Keith Matthew Thornton – vocals
- Paul Julian Banks – vocals (track 8)
- Teren Delvon Jones – vocals (track 9)
- Alex Swain – guitar, keyboards, drums, engineering
- Gary Wayne Holt – guitar (tracks: 4, 10)
- Merlo Podlewski – bass
- John Peter Alderete – bass
- Richard Quitevis – scratches
- Eric San – scratches (track 9)
- Daniel M. Nakamura – production, mixing
- Gordon Chumway – engineering
- Howie Weinberg – mastering

== Charts ==
Chart (2018)	Peak position
Belgian Albums (Ultratop Flanders)	158
US Top Album Sales (Billboard)	48
US Vinyl Albums (Billboard)	10
US Independent Albums (Billboard)	8
US Heatseekers Albums (Billboard)	1
US Indie Store Album Sales (Billboard)	4
