= KutMasta Kurt =

American hip-hop producer

- Also known as: Funky Redneck
- Origin: California, United States
- Genre: Hip-hop
- Occupations: Audio engineer; DJ; record producer
- Years active: 1989–present
- Label: Threshold Recordings
- Formerly of: Masters of Illusion; Tank Gawd

Kurt Matlin, professionally known as KutMasta Kurt, is an American hip-hop producer, best known for his work with Kool Keith as well as occasional tracks and remixes for artists such as the Beastie Boys, Linkin Park, and Dilated Peoples.

== Discography ==
=== Instrumental albums ===
- 2010 – Funky Redneck Visits Nippon
- 2011 – Drum-Break Hip-Hop Vol.1
- 2012 – 90's Beats
- 2015 – Beat Tape – 1992

=== Collaborative albums ===
- 2000 – Kut Masta Kurt Presents Masters of Illusion (w/ Kool Keith and Motion Man, as Masters of Illusion)
- 2002 – Clearing the Field (w/ Motion Man)
- 2004 – Diesel Truckers (w/ Kool Keith, as The Diesel Truckers)
- 2004 – KutMasta Kurt Presents Dopestyle 1231 (w/ MC Dopestyle and TomC3)
- 2007 – Kutmasta Kurt Presents Sex Style: The Un-Released Archives (w/ Kool Keith)
- 2007 – Ultra-Octa-Doom (w/ Kool Keith and Motion Man)
- 2014 – RetroMastas (w/ Retrogott)
- 2016 – Your Mom Is My Wife (The 1996 – 1997 Archives) (w/ Kool Keith)
- 2018 – Vintage Fresh (w/ Retrogott)
- 2020 – Microphone Deflection (w/ Moka Only as Tank Gawd)

=== Compilations ===
- 2004 – Redneck Games/Redneck Olympics

== Notable production credits ==
=== Albums ===
- Ultra – Big Time (1996)
- Kool Keith – Sex Style (1997)
- Dr. Dooom – First Come, First Served (1999)
- Lootpack – Soundpieces: Da Antidote (1999)
- Kool Keith – Matthew (2000)
- Motion Man – Pablito's Way (2006)
- Dr. Dooom – Dr. Dooom 2 (2008)

=== Tracks ===
- Dr. Octagon – "Dr. Octagon" and "Technical Difficulties" from the 1996 album Dr. Octagonecologyst
- Chino XL – "Deliver" from the 1996 debut album Here to Save You All
- Rasco – "Take It Back Home" and "Me & My Crew" from the 1998 album Time Waits for No Man
- Dilated Peoples – "Work the Angles" from the 2000 album The Platform
- Kool Keith – "Back Stage Passes" from the 2002 album Matthew
- 7L & Esoteric – "Rest in Peace" from the 2002 album Dangerous Connection
- PMD – "Straight From the Heart" from the 2003 album The Awakening
- Planet Asia – "Paper Up (Hustler's Theme)" from the 2004 album The Grand Opening
- FatHed – "What Do We Need Today?" from the 2004 album Night Train To Babble On
- Kool Savas – "Da bin, da bleib" from the 2004 album Die besten Tage sind gezählt
- Kool Keith – "Grandma's Boyee" from Grandma's Boy (2006 film)
- Marc Live – "This Is Street Music" from the 2007 album Validation

=== Remixes ===
- Planet Asia & 427 – "Bringin' It Back (Kut Masta Kurt Remix)" from the 1999 12" Bringin' It Back
- Dr. Octagon – "Blue Flowers" from the 1996 album Dr. Octagon
- Chino XL – "Kreep" from the 1996 debut album Here to Save You All
- Beastie Boys – "Body Movin'" from the 1998 album Hello Nasty
- Blackalicious – "Deception Part3: Redemption" from the 1999 album Nia
- Dilated Peoples – "No Retreat" from the 2000 album The Platform
- Linkin Park – "Enth E Nd" (remix of "In the End") from the 2002 album Reanimation
- Push Button Objects & Del The Funkee Homosapien & Mr. Lif – "360°" from the 2003 album Ghetto Blaster
- Mos Def & Diverse – "Whylin Out" from the 2003 album Chocolate Industries
- Kool Keith – "Flow Smooth" from the 2009 album Tashan Dorrsett
- Lord Diamonds & Moka Only & Michael Rushden – "Change Of The Guard" from the 2013 album I Am Rich
- Kool Keith presents – Tashan Dorrsett – "Basquiat" from the 2017 album The Preacher
- Luscious Jackson – "Ladyfingers" from the 1999 album Electric Honey. KutMasta Kurt's "Guaranteed Every Time Mix" is featured on the 2007 compilation album Greatest Hits.

=== Radio appearances ===
- Kurt occasionally appeared as a guest DJ on Mike Nardone's "We Came From Beyond", LA's longest running hip hop radio show, which is no longer on the air.
- Kurt was a frequent guest DJ on Mike Nardone & King Emz "The Joint" on LA's 92.3 the Beat . Later he filled Emz spot when he relocated to NYC.
- Kurt was a frequent guest DJ on Sway & King Tech's "Wake Up Show".
- Kurt was a weekly DJ for "Fat Friday's" at 90.9 KHDC Salinas, with The Verbal Tek from 1992–1994
- Kurt was a weekly DJ for "The Drum" at 90.1 KZSU Stanford, with Kevvy Kev from 1988–1994
- Kurt was a weekly DJ and Host for "Solid Funk" at 88.9 KUSP Santa Cruz, from 1985–1988
