= Saltburn (soundtrack) =

2023 film score by Anthony Willis

The soundtrack to the 2023 film Saltburn, directed by Emerald Fennell, consists of a score composed by Anthony Willis, as well as a number of pop songs. Willis had previously scored Fennell's Promising Young Woman (2020) and also M3GAN (2022). Saltburn (Original Motion Picture Score) features 18 cues from his score and was released by Milan Records on the same date as its international release, 17 November 2023. The soundtrack album, Saltburn (Music from the Motion Picture), was released on 28 June 2024.

== Background ==
At the Deadline Hollywood's Sound and Screen film event, Willis wanted the score to navigate the audiences through Oliver's (Keoghan) journey at University of Oxford, as he undergoes a wide range of emotions like loneliness, romance and lust. He also praised Fennell on her collaborative effort in making the score, that included use of "dirty synth", "gothic orchestral" and "electronic" sounds which was about "capturing this classical world that Oliver wants to fit into and he doesn't".

Apart from the score, the film used pop music as needle drops in subsequent scenes, so that it could drive the storyline; Fennell accompanied the use of needle drops in Promising Young Woman. One such song that played in the beginning of the film is the British coronation anthem "Zadok the Priest" as it felt like the "absolute apex of Brexit Britain" that provided "jingoistic" stuff. In discussion with Willis, she wanted the song to guide the film—playing in the beginning as well as in the end—so viewers would understand that it is a coronation. Fennell revealed that the Killers' "Mr. Brightside" was the most expensive cue in the film. Willis recorded the acoustic music at the Temple Church in London, as "the Templar knights are buried there!". The London Contemporary Orchestra further performed the score.

== Score album ==
Saltburn (Original Motion Picture Score)

Film score by Anthony Willis
- Released: 17 November 2023
- Recorded: 2022–2023
- Length: 43:58
- Label: Milan
- Producer: Anthony Willis

Anthony Willis chronology
M3GAN (Original Motion Picture Soundtrack) (2023)	Saltburn (Original Motion Picture Score) (2023)

Saltburn (Original Motion Picture Score) was released digitally on 17 November 2023. The LP was released on 3 May 2024 via Music on Vinyl, and omits the track "You're So Real".

Saltburn (Original Motion Picture Score) track listing
No.	Title	Length
1.	"I Loved Him / Oliver Quick!"	3:27
2.	"NFI'D"	1:38
3.	"Felix Amica"	2:35
4.	"Throwing Pebbles"	1:51
5.	"Journey to Saltburn"	1:19
6.	"Felix's Tour"	1:37
7.	"You're So Real"	1:02
8.	"A Shared Bathroom / Inconsistent Stories"	2:43
9.	"Venetia's See-Through Night Dress"	1:51
10.	"Slightly Bad Form"	1:54
11.	"Accusations & Departures"	0:54
12.	"The Summer Burned On"	0:49
13.	"Spit Roast"	2:55
14.	"Blood Run Cold"	1:46
15.	"The Maze"	2:21
16.	"Staff Exit"	1:52
17.	"Almost None"	5:35
18.	"Felix's Suite"	7:49
Total length:		43:58

== Soundtrack album ==
Saltburn (Music from the Motion Picture)

Soundtrack album by various artists
- Released: 28 June 2024
- Label: Polydor

Saltburn (Music from the Motion Picture) was released on 28 June 2024 on CD and digital formats. It consists of "indie sleaze" and pop songs popular in the 2000s. The album is also scheduled to be released as a standard red LP, an Amazon-exclusive gold LP, and a picture disc on 23 August 2024. In addition, a "bath water" liquid-filled LP is scheduled for release on 29 September 2024 via Bad World, referencing an infamous scene from the film.

Saltburn (Music from the Motion Picture) track listing
No.	Title	Artist(s)	Length
1.	"This Modern Love"	Bloc Party
2.	"Destroy Everything You Touch"	Ladytron
3.	"Hang Me Up to Dry"	Cold War Kids
4.	"No Cars Go"	Arcade Fire
5.	"Loneliness" (radio cut)	Tomcraft
6.	"Perfect (Exceeder)"	Mason vs Princess Superstar
7.	"Murder on the Dancefloor"	Sophie Ellis-Bextor
8.	"Time to Pretend"	MGMT
9.	"You're Gorgeous"	Babybird
10.	"Sound of the Underground"	Girls Aloud
11.	"Mr. Brightside"	The Killers
12.	"Satisfaction" (Isak original edit)	Benny Benassi & the Biz
13.	"Have a Cheeky Christmas"	The Cheeky Girls

== Charts ==
Chart performance for Saltburn
Chart (2024)	Peak position
UK Compilation Albums (OCC)	1
UK Soundtrack Albums (OCC)	1
US Billboard 200	139

== Reception ==
Sonya Alexander of Script Magazine wrote "Anthony Willis's lugubrious score underscores the vibrant pinings of each character". Amy Nicholson of Los Angeles Times wrote Willis' score featuring "tizzy of violins" paired the first glimpse of Oliver's new life.

One of the songs in the film, Sophie Ellis-Bextor's "Murder on the Dancefloor", was featured in the last scene. As a result, the song re-entered the top 40 UK singles chart and garnered its most-ever global streams on Spotify, receiving more than 1.4 million streams on New Year's Eve.

== Accolades ==
Award	Date of Ceremony	Category	Recipient(s)	Result	Ref
Hollywood Music in Media Awards	November 15, 2023	Original Score – Feature Film	Anthony Willis	Nominated	

In December 2023, the score was shortlisted for Best Original Score at the 96th Academy Awards.
