= Exceeder =

Single by Mason
- Released: 2006
- Genre: Electro house
- Length: 6:54
- Label: Great Stuff Recordings
- Songwriters: Coen Berrier, Iason Chronis

Mason singles chronology
"The Screetch" (2005)	"Exceeder" (2006)	"Perfect (Exceeder)" (2007)

"Exceeder" is an instrumental composition by Dutch electro house DJ Mason. It was first released on Great Stuff Recordings in late 2006, but was later re-released with many remixes, by Tomcraft and DJ F.E.X., among others.

It contains an interpolation of the 1984 song "Let It All Blow" by American funk band Dazz Band.

== Background ==
"Exceeder" was Mason's third single; his first two singles, "Helikopter" and "The Screetch", were released in 2004 and 2005, respectively, to little fanfare. He and Coen Berrier composed "Exceeder" in late 2005, carrying inspiration from the "Electro Nation" parties which they and other Dutch DJs threw in cities like Amsterdam and Rotterdam. Mason was concerned that it sounded too cheap and clichéd to release as a single, however, so he originally made it a B-side to an Italo disco track called "Follow Me", which, in his own words, "nobody cared about because when it came out, people were pushing for the B-side".

Originally released solely in the Netherlands through independent label Middle of the Road Records, "Exceeder" started gaining traction and became the subject of a bidding war, which culminated with Mason deciding to sign with Great Stuff Recordings, a renowned house and techno label in Germany. It gained massive popularity on Beatport and became one of the most popular tunes in Ibiza in the summer of 2006.

Many DJs later found "Exceeder" to be a desirable track to dub lyrics onto, and created songs such as "Technologic Exceeder", "Fergalicious Exceeder", and "Hollaback Exceeder". Another notable mix of this track appeared on some editions of the Ministry of Sound Maximum Bass 2007 compilation, credited as "Exceeder/Girl Dem Shaker" by Mason/Wideboys & MC JLC.

== "Perfect (Exceeder)" ==
In late 2006, "Exceeder" was mashed up with the a cappella of American rapper Princess Superstar's previous hit "Perfect" to create "Perfect (Exceeder)", which became a worldwide hit single when it was released through record label Ministry of Sound. In a 2024 interview with DJ Mag, Mason and Princess Superstar both said that they still did not know who had originally created the mash-up.

== Remixes ==
In 2010, remixes of Felguk, Tai and Mashtronic came out, via Zip Music. The Felguk remix reached 2nd place in the Beatport Top 100.

Also in 2014 Armada published a package containing remixes by DJ Umek & Mike Vale, Kill The Buzz, Corderoy, 2CV and Sonny Wharton. The DJ Umek & Mike Vale remix ranked 1st place in the Beatport Top 100.

New remixes by David Guetta and 1991 were released in 2024.

== Usage in media ==
- A special mix of this song is used in the game Wipeout HD and Wipeout Pulse. It is named "Exceeder (Special Mix)".
- There is a song in the expansion pack Spore Galactic Adventures called "Electronic" which is a remix of this song.
