= Felguk =

Brazilian DJs and record producers

- Origin: Rio de Janeiro, Brazil
- Genres: Electronic, dance, house, electro house
- Years active: 2007 – present
- Labels: HUB Records, Smash the House, Spinnin' Records, Musical Freedom
- Members: Felipe Lozinsky; Gustavo Rozenthal
- Website: http://www.felguk.com

Felguk is the stage name of the Brazilian DJs and record producer duo Felipe Lozinsky (born February 12, 1986) and Gustavo Rozenthal (born February 26, 1982).

== Career ==
The duo performed - and had their single "2nite" as the track for the official trailer - at the dance music festival Electric Daisy Carnival 2010. Later that year they played at Nocturnal Festival 2010, and peaked at #2 in Beatport with their remix of the 2007 dance hit "Exceeder". Felguk have also remixed Madonna's 2009 single, Flo Rida featuring David Guetta "Club Can't Handle Me", and The Black Eyed Peas "The Time (Dirty Bit)".

The duo began their own imprint, Dongle Records, in 2011, where they have released two singles, 'Blow Out,' and 'Jack It,' and will have another EP titled 'Bassive' out on Beatport on November 22.

In October 2011, Felguk was voted #87 in DJ Mag's Top 100 DJs poll and #90 in the same chart, in 2012.

Also in 2012, the duo was personally chosen by Madonna to open the concerts of the tour MDNA in Brazil.

Throughout its career, Felguk has established itself as a "top seller" on Beatport.com, and as of October 2014 had accumulated to a total of 12 tracks in the Top 10 ranking of electro-house, a #2 on Beatport's overall ranking with Exceeder remix, and #1 with its collaboration with Dimitri Vegas & Like Mike and Tujamo, "NOVA".

In September 2019, Gustavo announced on Instagram that since at the end of 2017, Felipe has been living in Portugal. Gustavo also stated that the duo will still remain, however Gustavo would continue touring by himself while Felipe would be working in the studio working on Felguk's projects.

== Discography ==
=== Releases ===
- Palmtree EP (2006)
- All Night Long EP (2008)
- WashEm and GiveEm food (2008)
- Buzz Me EP (2008)
- Jelly Beatz EP (2008)
- Do You Like Bass 2009 (2008)
- Guess What EP (2009)
- Step On The Scene EP (2009)
- Fingertips (2009)
- Keep Buzzing EP (2009)
- Rio EP (2009)
- The Funky Drama (2009)
- 2nite EP (2010)
- Galaxy Traveller EP (2010)
- Side By Side EP (2010)
- Score EP (2010)
- Blow Out (2011)
- Plastic Smile (Example vs. Felguk) (2011)
- Jack It (2011)
- Bassive (2011)
- Nudge (2011)
- Move It Right (2012)
- Wow (with Yves V) (2012)
- Blaze It Up (with Mr. Shammi) (2013)
- Slice & Dice EP (2013)
- Crunch (2013)
- Can You Feel It (2014)
- Monsta Skunk (2014)
- Nova (with Dimitri Vegas & Like Mike & Tujamo) (2014)
- La Tuba (2014)
- Showtime (2014)
- C'mon Rave On (2014)
- Slap (with FTampa) (2015)
- PUMP (with Syn Cole) (2015)
- Spin it Back (2015)
- Dance To The Beat (with Lazy Rich) (2015)
- This Live (2016)
- Love Bite (2016)
- Small Town (with Ricci) (2016)
- É Tudo o Que Eu Quero Ter (with Vanessa Da Mata) (2017)
- Monday (with Vintage Culture & Le Dib) (2017)
- Ai Ai Ai (with Cat Dealers & Vanessa Da Mata) (2018)
- My Phone (2018)
- Feel So Good (with Le Dib) (2019)
- Devotion 2020 (with Bingo Players and Fafaq) (2020)

=== Remixes ===
2008

- Egor Boss - I Don't Like The Drugs (Felguk Joy Mix)
- Jean-Claude Ades - I Begin To Wonder 2008 (Felguk Remix)
- Gataplex featuring Electra - Dance Forever (Felguk Remix)
- Miles Dyson - Anthem (Felguk Remix)
- Forfun - Suave (Felguk Remix)

2009

- Perfect Stranger - Stardust (Felguk Remix)
- Neelix - Disco Decay (Felguk Remix)
- Perplex featuring Electra - Toys (Felguk Remix)
- Madonna - Celebration (Felguk Love Remix)

2010

- Soundpusher - Milk & Honey (Felguk Remix)
- Mason - Exceeder (Felguk Remix)
- Flo Rida featuring David Guetta - Club Can't Handle Me (Felguk Remix)
- The Black Eyed Peas - The Time (Dirty Bit) (Felguk Remix)

2012

- Dirty South and Thomas Gold featuring Kate Elsworth - Eyes Wide Open (Felguk Remix)
- 12th Planet - The End Is Near (Felguk Remix)

2018

- Alok and Yves V featuring Gavin James - Innocent (Felguk Remix)
