= Mason (musician) =

Dutch DJ and producer (born 1980)

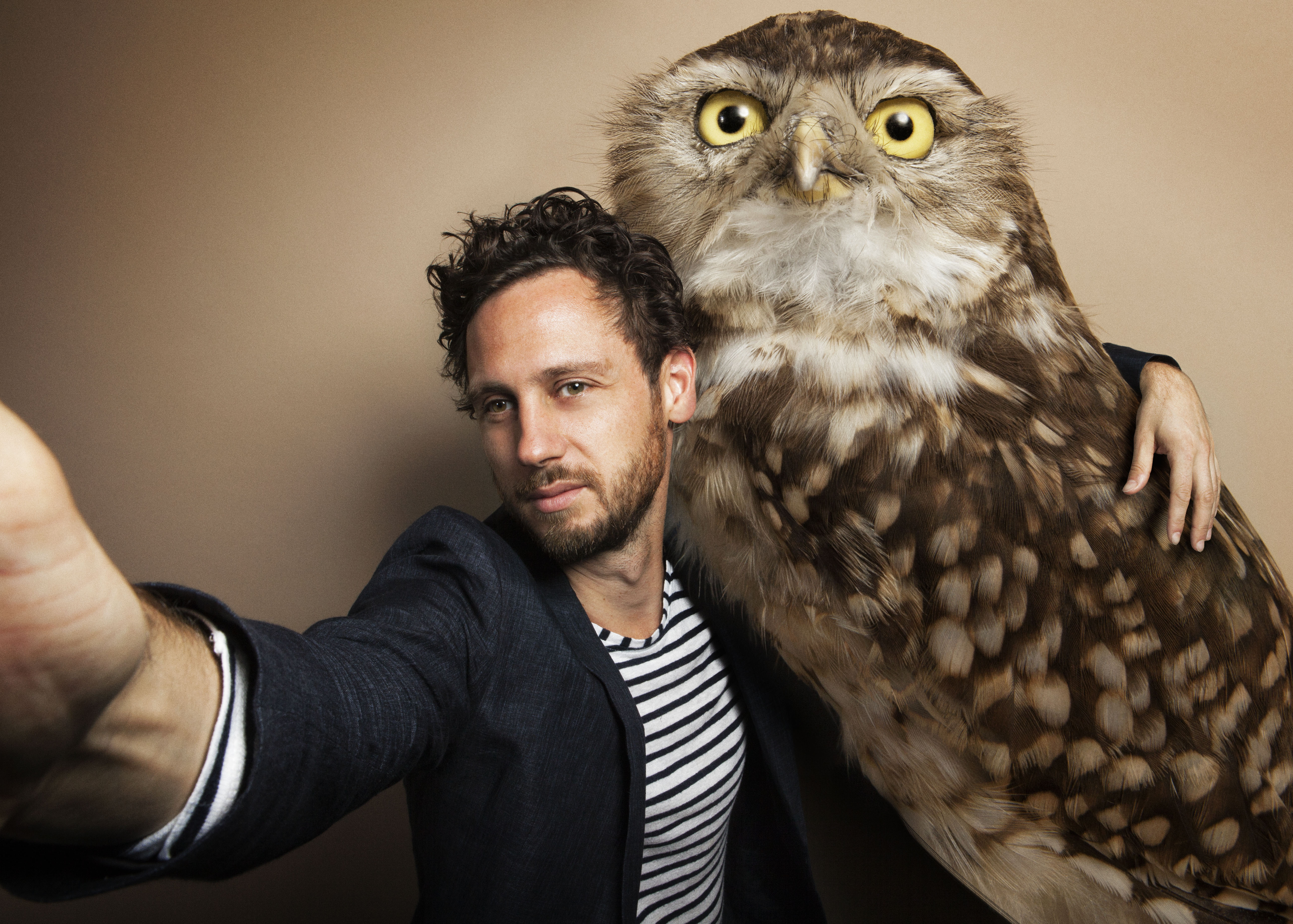
- Mason in 2016

Background information
- Born: Iason Chronis; 17 January 1980 (age 46); Amsterdam, Netherlands
- Occupations: DJ; record producer
- Years active: 1987–present
- Website: musicofmason.com

Iason Chronis (Greek: Ιάσων Χρόνης; born 17 January 1980), better known as Mason, is a Dutch DJ and record producer. He had a number one on the UK Dance Singles Chart in 2007 with his track "Exceeder", which had originally been an instrumental and had received a vinyl-only release in the UK in 2006. The new version of the track, "Perfect (Exceeder)", is a mashup with American rapper Princess Superstar's song "Perfect" and reached number 3 on the national British chart in January 2007. The track was a big hit in many countries worldwide. He also had chart success in 2011 with his song "Runaway"—which is a modern version of "Runaway" by Eruption, and "Boadicea", featuring Róisín Murphy—in 2016 with "Fashion Killa" (feat Stefflon Don), and with many club releases since. Mason is the owner of the record label Animal Language.

Mason has released music on numerous electronic music labels, such as Island Records, Defected, Skint, Toolroom, Great Stuff Recordings, and Fool's Gold Records, and remixed artists such as Moby, Steve Aoki, Hadouken!, Don Diablo, Mat Zo, 2Unlimited, Mylo, Metronomy, Tommy Trash, Martin Solveig, Robyn and Gabriella Cilmi.

Mason plays live shows as well as DJ sets and has performed at festivals such as Sensation White, Dance Valley, Tomorrowland, Nature One, Creamfields, Global Gathering and clubs such as Fabric, Ministry of Sound, Green Valley, Space Ibiza, Zouk, Octagon, Air and many others with over a thousand shows in more than 50 countries around the world. Mason is the organiser behind several parties throughout the Netherlands, including the Animal Language Kafe Rave and Avondwinkel at Club Nyx in Amsterdam. He is also on the board of Buma Cultuur and BAM! Popauteurs, representing Dutch pop and dance artists.

== Biography ==
Iason Chronis was born in Amsterdam to Dutch actress Adrienne Kleiweg and Greek sculptor Jorgos Chronis. Both his sisters, Iwana and Sarah, have been TV actresses too. His maternal greatgrandfather is anthropologist Johannes Pieter Kleiweg de Zwaan.

Chronis began learning the violin at age 6. In 1987, he sang in the eighth version of the Kinderen voor Kinderen choir and would continue to do so until the twelfth edition in 1991.

In 1995, he started doing DJ performances, initially in and around Amsterdam but later abroad. In 1999, he took a four-year course in Music Composition and Performance, which he graduated with honours and for which he received an award from the Dutch royal family. He used his violin skills during his DJ sets between 1999 and 2005. During his world tour with Tiësto in 2004, he played the violin during a live performance of "Lethal Industry", as well as being Tiesto's warm up DJ. In 2006, Coen Berrier joined Mason in the studio and during live shows, but left Mason in spring 2014. Berrier has had earlier UK chart success with "Husan" by Bhangra Knights.

In 2008, Mason launched his own label Animal Language. In 2011, he released his debut album They Are Among Us, which featured collaborations with Róisín Murphy, DMC, Sam Sparro, Kurtis Blow and Aqualung. In 2014 the second Mason album ZOA was released, featuring Jocelyn Brown, Zoot Woman, Rouge Mary (Hercules & Love Affair) among other featured artists.

In 2015, his single "Papapapa" on Loulou Records reached the number 1 position on the online DJ store Beatport. In the same year, Mason released his Nite Rite series, a collection of numbered Nite Rites, released on each full moon. Nite Rite Ten featured Danielle Moore from the UK indie band Crazy P on vocals. He also collaborated on releases with German house acts Moonbootica and Sharam Jey and remixed fellow Dutch acts Kraak & Smaak, Janne Schra and Arling & Cameron that year.

In 2016, Mason signed to Island Records and began work on material with US hip hop artist Azealia Banks. However, after racial and homophobic comments by her on Twitter, he ceased the collaboration and started to work with UK grime artist Stefflon Don, which led to the "Fashion Killa" single release, that reached a number 4 position on the UK dance chart. This song was also used for television ads for Boohoo.com, Deezer and America's Next Top Model. The song was widely supported on BBC Radio 1 and other UK national radio stations. He also mixed and compiled the Toolroom Miami Poolside album this year, which was released on Toolroom Records.

In 2017, Mason got signed to house label Defected Records, which released his single "Rhino", which got chosen as "hottest record in the world" on BBC Radio 1. He also collaborated with UK tech house producer Betoko and has remixed Sting and James Hype.

Since 2018 Mason released 'Dance Shake Move' via Skint/BMG Rights Management. This record got used for TV ads for brands like Colgate and Vodafone. He has also collaborated with Alex Clare the UK/US top 10 vocalist on Spinnin Records, released his second single for Island records featuring UK grime act The Manor as well as a collaboration with UK vocalist Jem Cooke and Shingai Shoniwa from The Noisettes. In 2019 he released 'Mason Remixed', a collection of his work remixed by artists such as Mike Mago, Junior Sanchez and Rex The Dog. In 2020 Mason released his third artist album 'Frisky Biscuits' on Toolroom Records. In 2021 he worked with The Metropole Orkest and released a collection of NFT's. His single 'Givin Up' together with Mark Knight became the #1 house record on Beatport that year. In 2022 he worked together with NY Hiphop artists Jungle Brothers Afrika Baby Bam and founded his own girl vocal trio 'The Masonettes', that accompany him on certain records and shows. In 2023 he had a radio hit in The Netherlands with the Masonettes called 'Are You Ready'. Later that year he released his 4th album 'Chroma Panorama', on which he collaborated with Sophie Barker (Zero 7), Dragonette, Jack Garratt, Sweetie Irie (Gorillaz), Poppy Hankin (Girl Ray) and many others.

"Perfect Exceeder" was used in the Grammy nominated soundtrack of the film Saltburn, which made it appear in a variety of national pop charts again throughout 2024. David Guetta, Oliver Heldens and 1991 made new remixes, which were released on Armada Music.

== Personal life ==
Mason revealed in May 2026 that he had Guillain-Barré Syndrome, a rare disorder in which the body's immune system attacks the peripheral nerves, and would be running 100 kilometres from London to Brighton to raise money for Inflammatory Neuropathies UK, the charity that supports people living with Guillain-Barré Syndrome and related conditions. He had been left partially paralysed by the condition in late 2019, but had not revealed it publicly. In a statement released by his publicist, he said: "I count my blessings that I had a relatively mild version, with 'just' damaged arm and leg nerves. Some GBS victims can't breathe or swallow on their own and are hospitalised for years, while being 100% mentally sharp. It's horrific. I'm raising money for research, but also to give a bit of awareness to those silently lying in rooms with the curtains drawn for years. People you don't hear about, but they're there. Maybe my effort can also give a bit of hope to them, knowing that full recovery is possible and that you can be physically strong again."

== Discography ==
=== Albums ===
Title	Album details
Top of the Clubs Volume 34	Released: 23 February 2007; Label: Kontor; Format: 2xCD; Note: mixed by Mason
5 Years Electronation	Released: 15 October 2007; Label: N.E.W.S.; Format: digital download; Note: mixed by Mason
The Amsterdam Tapes, Vol.1	Released: 27 October 2008; Label: New State; Format: digital download; Note: mixed by Mason
Mason presents: Animal Language	Released: May 2010; Label: Mag; Format: CD, digital download
They Are Among Us	Released: 17 July 2011; Label: Animal Language; Format: CD, digital download
Mason presents: Animal Language (Refurbished)	Released: 1 April 2012; Label: Animal Language; Format: digital download
ZOA	Released: 1 September 2014; Label: Animal Language; Format: CD, digital download
Nite Rites	Released: 26 Februari 2016; Label: Animal Language; Format: digital download
Toolroom Miami Poolside, mixed by Mason	Released: 4 March 2016; Label: Toolroom; Format: CD, digital download
Mason Remixed	Released: 14 June 2019; Label: Animal Language; Format: digital download
Frisky Biscuits	Released: 4 September 2020; Label: Toolroom; Format: digital download
Chroma Panorama	Released: 10 November 2023; Label: Animal Language; Format: digital download

Track listings for select albums

They Are Among Us (Deluxe Version)
No.	Title	Length
1.	"Runaway"	6:11
2.	"You Are Not Alone"	4:08
3.	"Choices" (featuring Kurtis Blow)	3:58
4.	"Syncrom"	5:09
5.	"Little Angel" (featuring Aqualung)	3:29
6.	"Kippschwinger"	3:40
7.	"I Just Wanna Rock You" (featuring Sway)	2:46
8.	"Boadicea" (featuring Róisín Murphy)	3:21
9.	"As the World Turns"	3:32
10.	"Corrected" (featuring DMC & Sam Sparro)	2:12
11.	"Little Red Petticoat"	5:35
12.	"Who Killed Trance"	5:05
13.	"Boadicea" (Human Life Mix) (featuring Róisín Murphy)	6:09
14.	"Boadicea" (Oliver $ Mix) (featuring Róisín Murphy)	5:03
15.	"Little Angel" (Rex the Dog Mix) (featuring Aqualung)	7:04
16.	"Solarium" (with Marcos Valle)	4:18
17.	"Boadicea" (Video)	3:41

Mason presents: Animal Language (Refurbished)
No.	Title	Length
1.	"Superimposer"	6:06
2.	"Superimposer" (Refurbished)	1:27
3.	"Do You Like Disco?" (by Arveene & Misk)	1:49
4.	"Do You Like Disco?" (Refurbished) (by Arveene & Misk)	5:38
5.	"You Are Not Alone" (Rene Amesz)	6:23
6.	"You Are Not Alone" (Refurbished)	3:41
7.	"Le Big Bob" (In Flagranti)	6:53
8.	"Le Big Bob" (Refurbished)	1:23
9.	"Feelsso" (by Tony Senghore & Cristian Dinamarca)	6:16
10.	"Feelsso" (Refurbished) (by Tony Senghore & Cristian Dinamarca)	2:13
11.	"Corrected" (Dub the Club) (featuring DMC & Sam Sparro)	6:41
12.	"Corrected" (Refurbished) (featuring DMC & Sam Sparro)	1:33
13.	"Capibara"	6:20
14.	"Capibara" (Refurbished)	3:39
15.	"Runaway" (Hatiras Mix)	5:37
16.	"Runaway" (Refurbished)	3:03
17.	"Who Killed Trance"	6:11
18.	"Who Killed Trance" (Refurbished)	1:56
19.	"Awake" (TWR72) (by Nelsen Grover)	7:07
20.	"Awake" (Refurbished) (by Nelsen Grover)	2:27
21.	"Syncrom" (Refurbished)	1:48
22.	"Kippschwinger" (Refurbished)	2:22
23.	"Continuous Mix"	43:28

=== Singles ===
2004

- "Helikopter" EP (Electrix)

2005

- The "Screetch" (Middle Of The Road)

2006

- "Exceeder" / "Follow Me" (Middle Of The Road)
- "Exceeder" (Great Stuff)
- "Bigboy Exercises" (Middle Of The Road)
- "The Benedict Files" (Aleph)

2007

- "Perfect (Exceeder)" (featuring Princess Superstar)
  (Armada Music)
- "The Screetch" (Great Stuff)
- "Quarter" (Great Stuff / Vendetta / Sound Division)

2008

- "Too Clumsy" (featuring Bob Sinclar)
  (Ministry Of Sound / Unique)
- "When Farmers Attack" (Malente Remix) (Unique)
- "Bermuda Triangle" (Hysterical Ego)
- "The Ridge" (Great Stuff)

2009

- "Kippschwinger" / "Amsterdam Tape" (Animal Language)
- "The Amsterdam Tape" (Blanco y Negro)
- "The Ridge" (Oliver Koletzki remix) (Great Stuff)
- "Front Row Chemistry" / "Capibara" (Animal Language)
- "At The Hippo Bar" / "Affra" (Animal Language)
- "Artex / "Intimate Express" (Pickadoll)
- "Ignite" / "Who Killed Trance" (Animal Language)

2010

- "Syncom" / "The Badger" (Animal Language)
- "Corrected" (featuring DMC & Sam Sparro) (Animal Language / Ministry Of Sound)
- "You Are Not Alone" (Animal Language)
- "Runaway" / "Let's Get Ferretic" (Animal Language)

2011

- "Runaway" (Ministry Of Sound)
- "Boadicea" (featuring Róisín Murphy) (Animal Language)
- "Little Angel" (featuring Aqualung) (Animal Language)

2012

- "Le Big Bob" (Animal Language)
- "Superimposer" (Animal Language)
- "The Kickoff" / "Chihuahua" (Animal Language)
- "Solarium" (featuring Marcos Valle) (Hysterical Ego)
- "Animat" (Spinnin' Records)
- "Doorman" / "Scaramouche" (Animal Language)
- "Get It Together" (Fool's Gold)
- "Bass Friend" (Cheap Thrills)

2013

- "Wombat" / "Maybe" (Animal Language)
- "Affected" (BMKLTSCH RCRDS)
- "Solid Gold" (featuring Pien Feith) (V2 Records)
- "Bubba" (GND Records)
- "Grotto" (Animal Language)
- "A Girl Like Me" (Great Stuff)
- "Peer Pressure" (Bad Life)
- "Roffelo" (from Drum Kids EP) (Animal Language)

2014

- "Get Back" (Boys Noize Records)
- "Someone I'm Not" (Great Stuff)
- "Savantas" / "Herd On The Scene" (Animal Language)
- "San Remo" / "Earmark" (Animal Language)
- "Gotta Have You Back" (Animal Language)
- "Salamander" / "Gotta Have You Back" (Animal Language)
- "Exceeder 2014 remixes" (Armada Music)

2015

- "Calabrese" / "Palmetto" (Secure Recordings)
- "Nite Rite One" (featuring Sash!) (Animal Language)
- "My Love EP feat. Moonbootica" (Animal Language)
- "Nite Rite Two" (Animal Language)
- "Nite Rite Three" (Animal Language)
- "Papapapa" (Loulou Records)
- "Nite Rite Four" (Animal Language)
- "Diatonic / I Knocked For Days" (Loulou Records)
- "Nite Rite Five" (Animal Language)
- "Nite Rite Six" (Animal Language)
- "My Name Is" (featuring Sharam Jey) (Bunny Tiger)
- "Nite Rite Seven" (Animal Language)
- "Nite Rite Eight" (Animal Language)
- "Nite Rite Nine" (Animal Language)

2016

- "Bubblebath" (featuring Loulou Players) (Loulou Records)
- "Nite Rite Ten" (featuring Danielle Moore) (Animal Language)
- "Dance Bodies (featuring Plus Instruments)" (Club Sweat)
- "Do The Do" (Toolroom)
- "Wurrkit" (Loulou Records)
- "My Ritual / Let It Go" (Animal Language)
- "Fashion Killa" (Island Records) UK)
- "Xylophobia" (featuring Yolanda Be Cool) (Sweat It Out)
- "Body Rock" (Loulou Records)
- "This Ain't No Disco EP" (Bunny Tiger)
- "Jigsaw" (Bunny Tiger)
- "Bubblebath (Remix)" (featiring Loulou Players & Sash!) (Loulou Records)
- "I Like It" (Animal Language)
- "Live On Dreams" (Kittball Records)

2017

- "Everybody EP" (Sweat It Out)
- "Toucan" (Animal Language)
- "Rhino" (Defected)
- "Freaky Girlsss" (Loulou Records)
- "Rumble In The Jungle / Amalia" (featuring Betoko) (Bunny Tiger)
- "Chronology EP" (Animal Language)

2018

- "Take A Chance" (Toolroom)
- "Dance, Shake Move" (Skint/Sony UK)
- "Stop Start Slow Fast" (featuring The Manor) (Island Records UK)
- "Disruptor" (Loulou Records)
- "Reminders Of You" (featuring Alex Clare) (Spinnin' Deep)

2019

- "Banzai" (Animal Language)
- "Bang Bang" (Animal Language)
- "Drowning In Your Love" (featuring Jem Cooke) (Another Rhythm)
- "Amphibia EP" (Reptile Dysfunction)
- "Rhythm In My Brain" (Toolroom)
- "Take It Down feat Slang" (Another Rhythm)
- "Do I Look Ridiculous / Sparta" (Loulou Records)

2020

- "Mind Goes Off EP with DJ Glen" (Animal Language)
- "Nightwalker" (Skint)
- "Loosen Up" (Toolroom)
- "The Get Down" (Toolroom)
- "Drowning In Your Love (Mark Knight Remix)" (featuring Jem Cooke) (Toolroom)

2021

- "Further Ado" (Toolroom Records)
- "Givin Up" (Animal Language)
- "March Of the Lizard" (featuring Metropole Orkest) (Animal Language)
- "Hush" (Reptile Dysfunction)
- "Givin Up" vs Mark Knight (Toolroom Records)

2022

- "Better On My Own" (Animal Language)
- "The Wicked" (featuring Afrika Baby Bam) (Armada Music)
- "Changes" (featuring The Masonettes) (Deep Root)

2023

- "Are You Ready" (featuring The Masonettes) (Another Rhythm)
- "Panic" (Altra Moda)
- "Sirens" (featuring Dragonette) (Animal Language)
- "Train Track" (featuring Sister Cookie) (Animal Language)

2024

- "Perfect Exceeder" (David Guetta / Oliver Heldens / 1991 Remix) (Armada Music)
- "Head Lost" (feat. SXCHA) (Another Rhythm)
- "Love On Repeat" (feat. Cara Melin) (TMRW)

Track listings for select maxi singles

Corrected - Remixes (featuring DMC and Sam Sparro)
No.	Title	Length
1.	"Corrected" (Radio Edit)	2:13
2.	"Corrected" (Extended Mix)	5:31
3.	"Corrected" (Dub the Club)	6:41
4.	"Corrected" (Riva Starr Remix Vocal)	7:23
5.	"Corrected" (Riva Starr Remix Dub)	7:06
6.	"Corrected" (Ralvero Remix)	5:44
7.	"Corrected" (Death Metal Disco Remix)	5:31
8.	"Corrected" (Freaky Friday Remix)	5:07
9.	"Corrected" (Alex Gopher Remix)	5:07
10.	"Corrected" (J Magic & Wickaman Remix)	5:33

Boadicea - Remixes (featuring Róisín Murphy)
No.	Title	Length
1.	"Boadicea" (Original Version)	3:21
2.	"Boadicea" (Original Instrumental)	3:32
3.	"Boadicea" (Mason's Battle Scarred Mix)	5:22
4.	"Boadicea" (Tony Senghore Dub Mix)	7:49
5.	"Boadicea" (Human Life Dub Mix)	6:09
6.	"Boadicea" (Evil Nine Mix)	7:37
7.	"Boadicea" (Oliver $ Mix)	5:03
8.	"Boadicea" (Sharam Jey Dub)	4:36
9.	"Boadicea" (Refurb by Tim Brownlow)	2:17
10.	"Boadicea" (Danny Howells & Mat Playford Mix)	6:09
11.	"Boadicea" (Polydor Mix)	4:55

=== Remixes ===
2005

- Don Diablo - "Blow your speakers" (Mason Remix) (Sellout Sessions)

2006

- Malente - "Revolution" (Mason Remix) (Unique)
- Don Diablo - "Never 2 Late to die" (Mason Remix) (Sellout Session)
- Loft 17 - "So Ready" (Mason Remix) (Molto)
- Monoloop - "Hypersentual" Love (Mason Remix) (Sugaspin)
- Crime Club – "The Beast" (Mason Remix) (Tiger Records / Kontor)
- Beatfreakz – "Superfreak" (Mason Remix) (Data / Ministry of Sound)
- Patrick Alavi – "Quiet Punk" (Mason Remix) (King Kong)
- The Ordinary Boys – "Lonely at the Top" (Mason Remix) (B-Unique)
- Joseph Armani presents: Corkscrew – "Elbow" (Mason Remix) (Craft Music)
- The Age Of Steam - "Disco Mafia" (Mason Remix) (CR2)

2007

- Kid Dusty – "Constant Rising" (Mason Remix) (Python)
- Cygnus X – "The Orange Theme" (Terry Toner & Mason remix) (Be Yourself Music)
- Don Diablo - "Blow your speakers" (Mason Remix) (Ministry of Sound)
- "Breathe" (Mason Remix)
- Groove Rebels – "Breakpoint" (Mason Remix) (Hammerskjoeld / Media)
- Shocka – "Style Attract Play" (Mason Remix) (featuring Honeyshot) (Factory)
- Freeform Five – "No More Conversations" (Mason Remix) (Universal)
- Mazi & Duriez – "This Is Not A Follow Up" (Mason Remix) (Brique Rouge)
- DJ DLG – "XESS" (Mason Remix) (Pickadoll)

2008

- AKA the Junkies – "Konijntje" (Mason Remix) (Magnetron Music)
- Noisia – "Gutterpump" (Mason Remix) (Skint)
- Hadouken! – "Declaration Of War" (Mason Vocal / Dub mix) (Atlantic)
- Gabriella Cilmi – "Save the Lies" (Mason Vocal / Dub mix) (Warner)
- Robyn – "Cobrastyle" (Mason Vocal Dub mix) (Konichiwa)
- Moby – "Im In Love" (Mason's Glowsticks-Mix) (Mute)

2009

- Martin Solveig – "One 2.3 Four" (Mason's Dark Disco Mix) (Mixture)
- Tommy Trash – "Stay Close" (Mason mix) (Ministry Of Sound Australia)
- Rex The Dog – "Prototype" (Mason's Animal Language mix) (Hundahaus)

2010

- JCA & TAI – "Yalla Yalla" (Mason remix) (Great Stuff)
- Evil Nine – "Stay Up" (Mason remix) (Gung-ho)
- Nelsen Grover - "Awake" (Mason Remix) (Animal Language)

2011

- Glenn Morrison – "Tokyo Cries" (Mason's Smallroom Mix) (Blackhole)
- Jesse Rose – "Non Stop" (Mason Remix) (Made To Play)
- Zoo Brazil – "Tear The Club Up" (Mason Remix) (Refune)
- Disco Of Doom – "Alice Cooper" (Mason's Schools Out Rework) (Discobelle Records)

2012

- Nobody Beats The Drum - "Blood On My Hands" (Mason's Na Na Na Na Remix) (Basserk)
- Steve Aoki & Angger Dimas - "Steve Jobs" (Mason Remix) (Dim Mak / Ultra)
- Petite Noir - "Till We Ghosts" (Mason Remix) (Bad Life)
- Sharam Jey – "Put Ya!" (Mason Remix) (Disco Fisco)

2013

- Wende – "Devils Pact" (Mason Remix) (BMG)
- De Jeugd van Tegenwoordig – "De Formule" (Mason Remix) (Magnetron Music)
- 2 Unlimited – "Tribal Dance" (Mason Remix) (Armada)
- Wannabe A Star – "PartyParty" (Mason's Downtempo Mix) (STRFCKR)
- Headz Up – "Onoria" (Mason Remix) (No Brainer)

2014

- Bottin - Poison Within (Mason Remix) (Bear Funk)
- Yolanda Be Cool - Sugar Man (Mason Remix) (Club Sweat)
- Worthy - Handle It (Mason Remix) (Anabatic Records)
- Stop Television - Change Strange (Mason Remix) (Animal Language)

2015

- Copy Club - The Sun, The Moon, The Stars (Mason Remix) (Spinnin')
- Janne Schra - Carry On (Mason Remix) (Embassy Of Music)
- Auxiliary Tha Masterfader - Feel For U (Mason Remix) (Animal Language)
- Arling & Cameron - Good Times (Mason Remix) (DUZT)
- Kraak & Smaak - All I Want Is You (Mason Remix) (Jalapeno Records)

2016

- Da Chick! – Do The Clap (Mason Remix) (Discotexas)
- Jack Garratt – Worry (Mason Remix) (Island Records)
- Mat Zo – Sinful (Mason Remix) (Mad Zoo)
- Keljet ft. Holychild – What's Your Sign (Mason's Capricorn Remix) (Universal)
- Vanilla Ace & Neari – Watch Out Now (Mason's Favela Remix) (Mix Feed)
- Mighty Mi ft. Gran Puba – Shake With Me (Mason Remix) (Toolroom)
- Endor feat. Feral is Kinky – Fever (Mason Remix) (Warner Music)
- Cowgum - We Love Amy (Mason Remix)
- Falco Benz - Like Today (Mason Remix) (Magnetron Music)

2017

- James Hype - More Than Friends (Mason Remix) (Warner UK)
- 1Click featuring Sting - Running Down Again (Mason Remix)
- Boy 8 Bit – Want You (Mason Remix) (Eton Messy)
- Jean Bacarezza & Loulou Records – Get Up (Mason Remix) (Bunny Tiger)

2018

- Beau Battant - Dance Alone (Mason & Joost van Bellen Remix) (Drive In)
- Sharam Jey feat. Little Boots (Mason Remix) (Bunny Tiger)

2020

- Girl Ray - Friend Like That (Mason Remix) (Moshi Moshi)
- Gettoblaster - Break Em Off (Mason Remix)

2021

- Mita & Biscuits - Tribalism (Mason Remix) (Toolroom Records
- Jeangu Macrooy - Birth Of A New Age (Mason Remix) (Unexpected Records)

2022

- Aafke Romeijn - Piepschuim (Mason Remix) (Aafke Romeijn Records)

2024

- Betoko - Raining Again (Mason Remix) (OKO Recordings)
- Nilu (DK - Shake For Me (Mason Remix) (Zatar Records)
