= Strictly Platinum =

Studio album by Princess Superstar
- Released: March 1996
- Recorded: 1995–1996
- Genre: Hip hop, electronica
- Label: 5th Beetle
- Producer: Greg Talenfeld; Godfrey Diamond; J.Z. Barrell; Wm. Berger

Princess Superstar chronology
Strictly Platinum (1996)	CEO (1997)

Singles from Strictly Platinum
- 1. "Smooth" Released: 1996

Professional ratings
Review scores
Source	Rating
Christgau's Consumer Guide	(neither)
Spin	3/10

Strictly Platinum is the debut studio album by American rapper Princess Superstar. It was released in 1996 via 5th Beetle and produced by Greg Talenfeld, Godfrey Diamond, J.Z. Barrell, Wm. Berger and Greg Griffith.

== Track listing ==
Strictly Platinum track listing
No.	Title	Writer(s)	Producer(s)	Length
1.	"Theme Song"	Concetta Kirschner	Godfrey Diamond; Greg Talenfeld (co.)	2:28
2.	"I'm So..."	C. Kirschner	Greg Talenfeld; Greg Griffith (co.)	3:08
3.	"Blue Beretta"	C. Kirschner	Greg Talenfeld; Greg Griffith (co.)	2:42
4.	"Smooth"	C. Kirschner	J.Z. Barrell	5:09
5.	"I'm White"	C. Kirschner	Godfrey Diamond; Greg Talenfeld (co.)	3:22
6.	"Fried Chicken: A Day in the Life"	C. Kirschner	Greg Talenfeld; Greg Griffith (co.)	2:50
7.	"Another Day"	C. Kirschner	J.Z. Barrell	3:36
8.	"Flavis Special"	C. Kirschner	Godfrey Diamond; Greg Talenfeld (co.)	4:20
9.	"No More Songs"	C. Kirschner	Godfrey Diamond; Greg Talenfeld (co.)	3:18
10.	"Crush"	C. Kirschner	J.Z. Barrell	2:52
11.	"An' I'm Outro"	C. Kirschner	Greg Talenfeld; Greg Griffith (co.)	0:51
12.	"Affirmative Action" (featuring Aaron 'Roboto' Cantor & POP)	C. Kirschner	Wm. Berger	5:52

Sample credits

- Track 6 contains elements from "Stay" by David Bowie (1976), "Hot Stuff" by the Rolling Stones (1976), "I Want You (She's So Heavy)" and "Get Back" by the Beatles (1969)

== Personnel ==
- Concetta Kirschner – main artist, lead vocals, guitar
- Aaron 'Roboto' Cantor – featured artist (track 12)
- Marvin Rucker – featured artist (track 12)
- Art Lavis – additional vocals, guitar
- Doug Pressman – additional vocals, bass
- Dupert Niles – backing vocals
- Jeffrey Jensen – backing vocals
- Linda Hagood – backing vocals
- Patrick Dougherty – keyboards
- Kirsten Pro Jansen – drums
- Al Martin – congas
- Catarina Nygren – saxophone
- E.R. Huckleberry – trumpet
- William M. Berger – guitar (tracks 4 and 10), producer (track 12)
- Godfrey Diamond – producer (tracks 1, 5, 8 and 9)
- Greg Talenfeld – producer (tracks 2–3, 6 and 11), co-producer (tracks 1, 5 and 8–9), engineering (tracks 1–3, 5–6, 8–9 and 11–12)
- J.Z. Barrell – producer and engineering (tracks 4, 7 and 10)
- Greg Griffith – co-producer (tracks 2–3, 6 and 11)
