= Princess Superstar Is =

Studio album by Princess Superstar
- Released: October 8, 2001
- Studio: The Vertical Corporation (New York City); Hi Pitch In House Productions; The Muthafuckin' Spot On Lexington; Parakeet Recording and Mastering Lab
- Genre: Hip hop
- Length: 59:02
- Label: Studio !K7; Rapster Records
- Producer: Princess Superstar; Curtis Curtis; Dart LA; DJ Mighty Mi; The Herbaliser; Mista Sinista; Big Jim Slade; Chops; Ghetalion; Lenny Lacem

Princess Superstar chronology
Last of the Great 20th Century Composers (2000)	Princess Superstar Is (2001)	My Machine (2005)

Singles from Princess Superstar Is
- 1. "Wet! Wet! Wet!/Keith N' Me" Released: September 2001; 2. "Bad Babysitter" Released: February 12, 2002; 3. "Keith N' Me" Released: August 27, 2002

Professional ratings
Review scores
Source	Rating
AllMusic	4/5 stars
Blender	3/5 stars
Pitchfork	8.0/10

Princess Superstar Is is the fourth studio album by American rapper and producer Princess Superstar. It was released in 2001 in the United States via Rapster Records. Audio production was handled by Concetta Kirschner, The Herbaliser, DJ Mighty Mi, Chops, Curtis Curtis, Dart LA, Big Jim Slade, Lenny Lacem, and Mista Sinista. It featured guest appearances from Kool Keith, Beth Orton, J-Zone, Bahamadia, The High & Mighty, and 7even. The album spawned three singles: "Wet! Wet! Wet!", "Bad Babysitter" and "Keith 'N Me". Its lead single, "Bad Babysitter", peaked at number 11 on the UK Singles Chart, number 14 on the Belgian Ultratop 50 Singles, number 38 on the Australian Singles Chart, number 94 on the German Singles Chart.

== Track listing ==
Princess Superstar Is track listing
No.	Title	Writer(s)	Producer(s)	Length
1.	"Super Fantasy"	C. Kirschner; C. Webster	Curtis Curtis; Princess Superstar (add.)	1:41
2.	"Bad Babysitter" (featuring The High & Mighty)	C. Kirschner; E. Meltzer; M. Berger	DJ Mighty Mi	3:35
3.	"Keith 'N Me" (featuring Kool Keith)	C. Kirschner; K. Thornton; J. Parker	Dart LA	4:24
4.	"Wet! Wet! Wet!"	C. Kirschner; M. Berger	DJ Mighty Mi	3:27
5.	"We Got Panache"	C. Kirschner	Ghetalion; Princess Superstar	3:18
6.	"Trouble"	C. Kirschner; L. Smythe	Lenny Lacem; Curtis Curtis (add.); Princess Superstar (add.)	3:32
7.	"You Get Mad at Napster"	C. Kirschner	Princess Superstar; Curtis Curtis (add.)	4:05
8.	"Untouchable, Pt. 2" (featuring Beth Orton)	C. Kirschner; E. Orton; S. Jung	Chops; Curtis Curtis (add.); Princess Superstar (add.)	3:34
9.	"Untouchable, Pt. 1" (featuring 7Even)	C. Kirschner; A. Phillips; J. Wherry; O. Teeba	The Herbaliser	3:35
10.	"What Is It?" (featuring Mista Sinista)	C. Kirschner; J. Wright	Mista Sinista; Curtis Curtis (add.); Princess Superstar (add.)	1:49
11.	"Welcome to My World"	C. Kirschner	Princess Superstar; Curtis Curtis (add.)	3:43
12.	"I Love You (Or at Least I Like You)" (featuring J-Zone)	C. Kirschner; J. Mumford	Princess Superstar; Curtis Curtis (add.)	4:13
13.	"Who Writes Your Lyrics"	C. Kirschner	Princess Superstar; Curtis Curtis (add.)	2:43
14.	"Dichotomy"	C. Kirschner; J. Slade	Big Jim Slade; Curtis Curtis (add.); Princess Superstar (add.)	3:26
15.	"Keith 'N Me (Remix)" (featuring Kool Keith)	C. Kirschner; K. Thornton; J. Parker	Dart LA	4:32
16.	"Too Much Weight / You Get Mad at Napster (Reprise)" (featuring Bahamadia)	C. Kirschner; A. Reid	Princess Superstar; Curtis Curtis (add.); Walter Sipser (add.)	7:25
Total length:				59:02

Sample credits

- Track 2 contains elements from "Mr. Bumble" by Syd Dale (1969)
- Track 7 contains elements from "Cargo Culte" by Serge Gainsbourg (1971)
- Track 10 contains elements from "I Wanna Go Home" by Holly and the Italians (1981)
- Track 11 contains elements from "It's a New Day" by Skull Snaps (1973)
- Track 12 contains elements from "Juicy Fruit" by Mtume (1983)
- Track 14 contains elements from "Light Sleeper" by Saafir (1994)
- Track 16 contains elements from "Expo Tenerife" by South American Getaway (1997)

== Personnel ==
- Concetta Kirschner – main artist, producer (tracks 5, 7, 11–13 and 16), additional producer (tracks 1, 6, 8, 10 and 14), executive producer, mixing and recording (tracks 1–8 and 10–16)
- Keith Matthew Thornton – featured artist (tracks 3 and 15)
- Erik Meltzer – featured artist (track 2)
- Milo Berger – featured artist (track 2), producer (tracks 2 and 4)
- Elizabeth Caroline Orton – featured artist (track 8)
- Aaron Phillips – featured artist (track 9)
- Joel Wright – featured artist and producer (track 10), scratches (track 5)
- Jay Mumford – featured artist (track 12)
- Antonia Reed – featured artist (track 16)
- Walter Sipser – bass (tracks 1, 5, 8, 10–13 and 15–16), additional producer (track 16)
- Lee Farber – drums (tracks 7 and 16)
- Curtis Webster – guitar (track 7), producer (track 1), additional producer (tracks 6–8, 10–14 and 16), mixing and recording (tracks 1–8 and 10–16)
- Kester Lydon – bass (track 9)
- Jake Wherry – keyboards (track 9), producer and mixing (track 9)
- Oliver Lawrence Trattles – scratches (track 9), producer and mixing (track 9)
- Perrin Wright – scratches (tracks 11 and 14)
- Pete Kohl – guitar (track 13)
- Paula Henderson – horns (track 16)
- Steve Moses – horns (track 16)
- John C. Parker – producer (tracks 3 and 15)
- Ghetalion – producer (track 5)
- Leonard Smythe – producer (track 6)
- Scott Robert Jung – producer (track 8)
- Big Jim Slade – producer (track 14)
- Julian Crane – recording (track 8)
- Paul Stadden – recording (track 8)
- Nigel Laybourne – mixing (track 9)
- Greg Vaughn – mastering
- Ned Ambler – photography
