= Perfect (Exceeder) =

2007 single by Mason vs Princess Superstar

- Original 12-inch vinyl cover

Single by Mason vs Princess Superstar
- Released: 2006
- Genre: Electro house
- Length: 2:41
- Label: Data; Armada Music
- Songwriters: Coen Berrier; Iason Chronis; Concetta Kirschner; Milo Berger

Mason singles chronology
"Exceeder" (2006)	"Perfect (Exceeder)" (2006)

Princess Superstar singles chronology
"My Machine" (2005)	"Perfect (Exceeder)" (2007)	"Licky" (2008)

"Perfect (Exceeder)" is a collaboration between Dutch musician Mason and American rapper Princess Superstar. The track is a mashup of Mason's 2006 instrumental dance track "Exceeder" and Princess Superstar's 2005 single "Perfect". The song was released through Ministry of Sound in 2006 and became a global success, including reaching number three in the United Kingdom.

"Perfect (Exceeder)" was included on the soundtrack for the 2023 film Saltburn, causing a resurgence of popularity in early 2024. Off the back of this resurgence, French DJ David Guetta released a remix of "Perfect (Exceeder)" in February 2024.

== Background ==
"Perfect" was released in 2005 and despite remixes from the likes of Armand Van Helden and Todd Terry, was not a success. Mason, meanwhile, composed "Exceeder" in 2006 as a B-side to an Italo disco track. A mash-up of the two tracks was created at some point in 2006, though neither Mason nor Princess Superstar know who created it. After hearing the original mash-up, Mason reached out to Princess Superstar, who was up for re-recording her vocals for the new track and it was released through Ministry of Sound in 2006.

== Critical reception ==
At the 23rd Annual International Dance Music Awards, "Perfect (Exceeder)" was nominated in the category "Best Breaks/Electro Track", but lost to "Love Is Gone" by David Guetta.

== Chart performance ==
The track became a big hit in the club scene in late 2006, especially across Europe and Brazil. The track was officially released via Data Records on 22 January 2007 in the UK. The track entered the chart at number 11 one week before the physical release, based on downloads. Upon the week of its physical release, the track moved up eight spots to number three. In the Netherlands, the song entered the Dutch Top 40 at number 54 (eventually peaking at number 11) and was the DanceSmash of the week. In 2024, following the song's appearance on the soundtrack to the film Saltburn (2023), the song reappeared on the UK Singles Chart, climbing to number 26 on the chart dated 12 January 2024.

== Music video ==
The music video was directed by Marcus Adams. It stars Lauren Ridealgh, Casey Batchelor and Lisa Shepley as gymnasts who mime to the lyrics performed by Princess Superstar. Valentina Bodorova appears as a genuine rhythmic gymnast acting as body double. Princess Superstar revealed that she did not know of the music video's existence until she saw it on YouTube, having been told by Ministry of Sound that she would feature in it. She instructed lawyers to take legal action against Ministry of Sound, but by the time they tried to, the video already had millions of views and the song had become a hit. A cease and desist order was taken, however, when Princess Superstar found out that Ministry of Sound had sent Ridealgh, Batchelor and Shepley to perform in nightclubs as "Princess Superstar".

== Track listings ==
UK CD1

1. "Perfect (Exceeder)" (Radio Edit)
2. "Perfect (Exceeder)" (Vocal Club Mix)

UK CD2

1. "Perfect (Exceeder)" (Radio Edit)
2. "Perfect (Exceeder)" (Vocal Club Mix)
3. "Exceeder" (Instrumental Club Mix)
4. "Exceeder" (Martijn ten Velden Instrumental Remix)
5. "Perfect (Exceeder)" (Tomcraft Remix)
6. "The Fanfare" (Hidden Track)

UK 12-inch vinyl

1. "Perfect (Exceeder)" (Vocal Club Mix)
2. "Exceeder" (Instrumental Club Mix)
3. "Perfect (Exceeder)" (Outwork Remix)

== Charts ==
=== Weekly charts ===
Chart (2006–2007)	Peak position
Belgium (Ultratop 50 Flanders)	18
Belgium Dance (Ultratop Flanders)	1
Belgium (Ultratip Bubbling Under Wallonia)	8
Belgium Dance (Ultratop Wallonia)	1
CIS Airplay (TopHit)	113
Europe (Eurochart Hot 100)	12
Finland (Suomen virallinen lista)	5
Germany (GfK)	69
Hungary (Dance Top 40)	20
Ireland (IRMA)	11
Netherlands (Dutch Top 40)	17
Netherlands (Single Top 100)	11
Russia Airplay (TopHit)	108
Scottish Singles Sales (Official Charts)	3
Spain (Promusicae)	10
Sweden (Sverigetopplistan)	60
Ukraine Airplay (TopHit)	181
UK Singles (Official Charts)	3
UK Dance (Official Charts)	1

Chart (2024)	Peak position
Latvia Airplay (LAIPA) (David Guetta Remix)	18
Lithuania (AGATA)	48
Netherlands (Tipparade)	10
UK Singles (Official Charts)	26
UK Dance (Official Charts)	9
UK Indie (Official Charts)	2
US Hot Dance/Electronic Songs (Billboard)	10

=== Year-end charts ===
Chart (2007)	Position
Netherlands (Single Top 100)	90
UK Singles (OCC)	44

== Certifications ==
Region	Certification	Certified units/sales
New Zealand (RMNZ)	Gold	15,000^{‡}
United Kingdom (BPI)	Platinum	600,000^{‡}
^{‡} Sales+streaming figures based on certification alone.

== Usage in media ==
"Perfect (Exceeder)" was featured in the 2023 film Saltburn, leading to renewed interest in the song. It was also used by Marks & Spencer for its Autumn 2025 campaign, in a pair of adverts titled "She's Back" and "Let's Go Autumn".

== "Perfect" by Princess Superstar ==
"Perfect"

Single by Princess Superstar

from the album My Machine
- Released: July 19, 2005
- Label: K7
- Songwriters: Concetta Kirschner; Milo Berger

Princess Superstar singles chronology
"Coochie Coo (EP)" (2005)	"Perfect" (2005)	"My Machine" (2005)

"Perfect" is a song by American rapper Princess Superstar. It was released in Germany on July 19, 2005, in the UK on August 29, 2005, in the US and Japan on August 30, 2005, and in Australia on October 10, 2006. It is the only single from her album My Machine with a music video. She told DJ Mag that the title was made to be ironic, as it was about "how imperfect I am".

=== Music video ===
The music video features Princess Superstar in a variety of locations, which includes what looks like a roller disco and a 1980s spoof.

=== Track listing ===
1. "Perfect" (Album Version / Dirty)
2. "Perfect" (Michi Lange's Sidekick Remix)
3. "Perfect" (Mr No & Alexander Technique Mix)
4. "Perfect" (Michi Lange's Sidekick Dub)
5. "Perfect" (A Capella)
6. "Perfect" (E-Thunder Chicas Locas Tribal Mix)

=== Charts ===
Chart performance for "Perfect"
Chart (2006)	Peak position
Australia (ARIA)	81

=== Song usage ===
Miss Kittin used "Perfect (A Capella)" on her mix album A Bugged Out Mix.
