= M3GAN (soundtrack) =

M3GAN (Original Motion Picture Soundtrack)

Film score by Anthony Willis
- Released: January 6, 2023
- Recorded: 2022
- Genre: Film score
- Length: 62:29
- Label: Back Lot Music
- Producer: Anthony Willis

Anthony Willis chronology
The Drive (2023)	M3GAN (2023)	Saltburn (2023)

M3GAN (Original Motion Picture Soundtrack) is the soundtrack to the 2022 film M3GAN directed by Gerard Johnstone. Featuring musical score composed by Anthony Willis, the album consisted of 29 tracks were released by Back Lot Music on January 6, 2023. The soundtrack was further issued on vinyl LP by Waxwork Records on March 10, 2023.

== Background ==
Johnstone wanted several factors that did not feel clichéd, which also applied to the music as well. He had a vision that the AI doll M3GAN would sing as well as playing piano, and there was a song written into the script. He listened to Willis' score for Promising Young Woman (2020) and liked it as well as the film's femme fatale aspect, which attracted Willis. During a discussion with Johnstone and the executives of Blumhouse Productions, Willis suggested to do musical arrangements similar to that of Disney animated films. The idea eventually attracted the producers and Willis was hired as the film's composer.

== Production ==
=== Score ===
The score had several elements, where Johnstone demanded a "deeper and richer" music more than the string arrangements, and also the action music should have more intensity. It then turns into a "dark Alice in Wonderland" kind of melancholy that is set in a contemporary tech environment. The harmonies were played consistently in the dramatic moments, and the common denominator being the range of musical colors, according to Willis. Even in the action music, the harp is used as it had a feminine color, and it would become dark when it is ripped really fast, becoming strong and heartless. The score also had string music, which Johnstone wanted it to be warm, which was different from a horror film director.

Willis wrote a descending motif that was not melodic in a traditional lyrical sense, but something was identifiable. He further described it as "the death riff" which plays when M3GAN finds that Cady's parents have died and she starts processing death, which features a sequence where M3GAN looks out the window and sees a butterfly and helicopter and starts to process and fill in the blanks in her programming. For the sonic palette, he used a vibraphone because of its ambiguous, organic and metallic quality and because of its fluttering mechanism, it was slightly technical providing a sci-fi quality. Later he used a piano, it make it bit more unique to M3GAN blending with a small piano. The vocal harmonies were done by Willis' friend Holly Sedillos.

An array of instruments such as synths, anvils, low percussion, were provided for the intense action music. He used instrumentation from the traditional horror palette which emulates the shape of chanting.

=== Songs ===
Willis wrote a melody send to Johnstone and thought that it could be a bit robotic, like a song that will be written by an AI, as the whole gag was M3GAN is writing the song. Further Johnstone wanted it to be a bit nostalgic and emotional as M3GAN trying to comfort Cady. The song titled "Tell Me Your Dreams" was played by Willis on piano, with Johnstone writing the lyrics. After recording the track, he gave the audio to the M3GAN doll and had to sync with the lip movements to the speed of reality, which later got tightened with the visual effects. Later the vocals were recorded with Jenna Davis in studio. Another song titled "Titanium" was also included in the script, which had a similar process for the first song.

== Track listing ==
No.	Title	Length
1.	"Funki Headquarters"	1:09
2.	"A Message from Oregon"	1:50
3.	"Those Aren't Toys"	2:43
4.	"Reluctant Guardian / Meeting Bruce"	3:40
5.	"Prototype"	1:09
6.	"The Perfect Algorithm"	2:27
7.	"On the Subject of Death"	2:16
8.	"A Hole in the Fence"	1:14
9.	"Calibrated Response"	3:19
10.	"Corporate Misdeeds"	0:48
11.	"Tell Me Your Dreams" (ft. Jenna Davis)	1:11
12.	"Attachment Theory"	2:49
13.	"Bully in the Forest"	1:50
14.	"Bad Boys Equal Bad Men"	2:21
15.	"Angel of Death"	2:07
16.	"Titanium" (ft. Jenna Davis)	0:59
17.	"Approximately 5 Feet Deep"	2:12
18.	"Detectives & Missing Data Reports"	4:06
19.	"True Guardian"	2:05
20.	"She's Still Plugged In"	2:56
21.	"Departing Funki"	1:25
22.	"Megan's Fantasy"	2:44
23.	"Workshop Duel"	1:45
24.	"Two Titans"	2:36
25.	"Model 3 Generative AN-droid"	1:41
26.	"A Message from Elsie"	1:05
27.	"Funki Redux"	0:53
28.	"Life & Death" (Suite from M3GAN)	5:16
29.	"Bruce's Dream" (Bonus Track)	1:53
Total length:		62:29

== Reception ==
David Rooney of The Hollywood Reporter wrote "Anthony Willis' score shifts from foreboding mode into full-scale alarm." Dylan Roth of The New York Observer "The broad musical score from composer Anthony Willis serves to remind the audience to expect hyperbole, such that anyone could walk into the movie midway through and recognize it as a comedy in seconds."

== Accolades ==
Award	Date of Ceremony	Category	Recipient(s)	Result	Ref
Hollywood Music in Media Awards	November 15, 2023	Original Score – Horror/Thriller Film	Anthony Willis	Nominated	

== Release history ==
Release dates and formats for M3GAN (Original Motion Picture Soundtrack)
Region	Date	Format(s)	Label	Ref.
Various	January 6, 2023	Digital download; streaming	Back Lot Music	
Various	March 10, 2023	Vinyl	Waxwork Records	
