= My Machine =

Studio album by Princess Superstar
- Released: August 1, 2005
- Genres: Hip hop; electronica
- Length: 77:00
- Label: Studio !K7
- Producer: Princess Superstar

Princess Superstar chronology
Princess Superstar Is (2001)	My Machine (2005)	The Best of Princess Superstar (2007)

Professional ratings
Review scores
Source	Rating
AllMusic	3/5 stars
Gigwise	3.5/5 stars
The Guardian	3/5 stars
PopMatters	8/10
RapReviews	7/10
Uncut	3/5 stars

My Machine is the fifth studio album by American rapper Princess Superstar. It is produced by herself as well as well-known producers such as house music pioneer Todd Terry, DJ Mighty Mi from the High and Mighty, Jacques Lu Cont, Junior Sanchez, and pioneering hip hop/electro producer Arthur Baker.

Other producers include Armand van Helden, Loose Cannons & Jon Plateau Selvig, Malito "Maleet", Alexander Technique, Mr. Nô, Boris Dlugosch, Bryan Black, Johnny Toobad, Eddie Cooper, Motor, and Chris Rubix. Not surprisingly, the album is more electronica-oriented, although there are also some hip hop tracks without electronica influences on the album.

== Track listing ==
1. "Intro via the TelePATH"
2. "I Like It a Lot"
3. "The Classroom"
4. "Famous"
5. "Dolly's Duplicants"
6. "On Top Bubble"
7. "The Mysterious Hanger"
8. "Bad Girls N.Y.C"
9. "10,000 Hits"
10. "Quitting Smoking Song"
11. "Sex, Drugs & Drugs"
12. "Initially"
13. "I'm So Out of Control"
14. "Coochie Coo"
15. "World Council Entertainment Dicktatorship"
16. "Perfect"^{A}
17. "What Do You Want?"
18. "Push, Make It Work"
19. "What You Gonna Do?"
20. "My Machine"
21. "The Death of the Superstar"
22. "Artery"
23. "The Great Brain Revolution"
24. "The Happy"
25. "The End"
26. "My Machine" (Tommy Sunshine's Brooklyn Fire Retouch) – iTunes exclusive track

^A Later released mash-up version, "Perfect (Exceeder)," was a hit single.
