= Saltburn (film) =

2023 film by Emerald Fennell

- Theatrical release poster
- Directed by: Emerald Fennell
- Written by: Emerald Fennell
- Produced by: Emerald Fennell; Josey McNamara; Margot Robbie
- Starring: Barry Keoghan; Jacob Elordi; Rosamund Pike; Richard E. Grant; Alison Oliver; Archie Madekwe; Carey Mulligan
- Cinematography: Linus Sandgren
- Edited by: Victoria Boydell
- Music by: Anthony Willis
- Production companies: Metro-Goldwyn-Mayer; MRC; Lie Still; LuckyChap Entertainment
- Distributed by: Amazon MGM Studios (United States); Warner Bros. Pictures (United Kingdom)
- Release dates: 31 August 2023 (Telluride); 17 November 2023 (United Kingdom and United States)
- Running time: 131 minutes
- Countries: United Kingdom; United States
- Language: English
- Box office: $21.1 million

Saltburn is a 2023 black comedy thriller film written, directed, and produced by Emerald Fennell, starring Barry Keoghan, Jacob Elordi, Rosamund Pike, Richard E. Grant, Alison Oliver, Archie Madekwe and Carey Mulligan. Set in Oxford and Northamptonshire, it focuses on a student at the University of Oxford who becomes fixated with a popular, aristocratic fellow student, who later invites him to spend the summer at his eccentric family's estate.

Saltburn premiered at the 50th Telluride Film Festival on 31 August 2023. It was released in cinemas in the United Kingdom on 17 November 2023 and in select cinemas in the United States on the same day. The film had its US wide release on 22 November before its streaming release by Amazon Prime Video on 22 December, on which it became one of the most-streamed films. The film received positive reviews (particularly for the performances of Keoghan and Pike, production design, score, and cinematography) and was nominated for two Golden Globe Awards and five BAFTA Film Awards.

== Plot ==
In 2006, scholarship student Oliver Quick struggles to fit in at the University of Oxford because of his inexperience with upper-class manners. He befriends Felix Catton, a popular student from a wealthy family who is sympathetic to Oliver's stories of his parents' substance abuse and mental health issues. When Oliver says that his father has died suddenly, Felix comforts him and shares with him a family ritual to engrave a stone with the name of the deceased, and to throw it in a lake; and invites him to spend the summer at his family's country house, Saltburn.

At Saltburn, Oliver meets Felix's parents Sir James and Lady Elspeth Catton, his sister Venetia, and Elspeth's friend Pamela, and he reunites with Felix's American cousin Farleigh, with whom Oliver has had a tense relationship as Oxford classmates. Oliver quickly wins over Felix's family except for Farleigh, and his obsession with Felix grows. One night, after watching Felix masturbate in a bathtub, he lustfully drinks the semen-laced bathwater. Later, having seen Venetia waiting outside his bedroom window, he performs oral sex on her while she is on her period. Farleigh witnesses this and informs Felix, but Oliver claims nothing happened when Felix confronts him. At night, Oliver sneaks into Farleigh's room while he is sleeping and makes sexual advances on him, threatening him in the process. The next morning, James evicts Farleigh after receiving a report from Sotheby's about his intention to sell some of James' valuable Huguenot ceramics.

As the summer ends, Elspeth and James plan a party for Oliver's birthday. Felix surprises Oliver with a trip to see his estranged mother, causing Oliver to panic. Upon arriving at the family's house in Prescot, Felix realises Oliver had lied to him about his upbringing. His father is still alive, neither of his parents had substance abuse or mental health troubles, and they live in a respectable middle class suburb. Horrified and hurt by Oliver's deception, Felix decides not to tell anyone to spare his own family the humiliation but orders Oliver to leave Saltburn after the party. During the extravagant celebrations, Oliver seeks to make amends with Felix by expressing his adoration for him, but Felix rejects him and suggests he seek help.

The next morning, Felix is found dead in Saltburn's hedge maze. Oliver implies Felix's death was connected to Farleigh supplying drugs during the party, and James withdraws financial support from Farleigh and bans him from ever returning. Oliver mourns Felix and visits his grave alone, where he lies naked on the grave and humps the soil. After Felix's funeral, Elspeth insists Oliver extend his stay at Saltburn. Venetia, increasingly distraught and disturbed, accuses Oliver of destroying her family. He attempts to seduce her, but she eventually rebuffs him. The next day, Venetia is found dead, having slit her wrists in the bathtub. Despondent over Oliver's continuing presence at Saltburn and Elspeth's closeness to him, James bribes him to leave, which Oliver accepts.

In 2022, Oliver reads about James's death in a newspaper. He subsequently has what seems to be a chance encounter with Elspeth at a café. She is delighted to see him again, insisting he return with her to Saltburn. After spending several months with Oliver, Elspeth becomes terminally ill. On her deathbed, Oliver confides to Elspeth that he killed the whole family and is responsible for all of the tragic and horrifying events at Saltburn. He orchestrated his initial meeting with Felix at Oxford and poisoned Felix's drink in the maze, resulting in his death. He seduced Farleigh in order to use his e-mail to offer Sotheby's the ceramics so James would oust him. He also placed razor blades beside Venetia while she was bathing, encouraging her suicide. He even engineered his encounter with Elspeth at the café, after which she bequeathed all her assets, including Saltburn, to him. He then removes her life support, killing her. Having now assumed ownership of Saltburn and the Catton family fortune, Oliver happily dances naked around the mansion, revealing in the end that he removed all the engraved stones from the lake.

== Cast ==
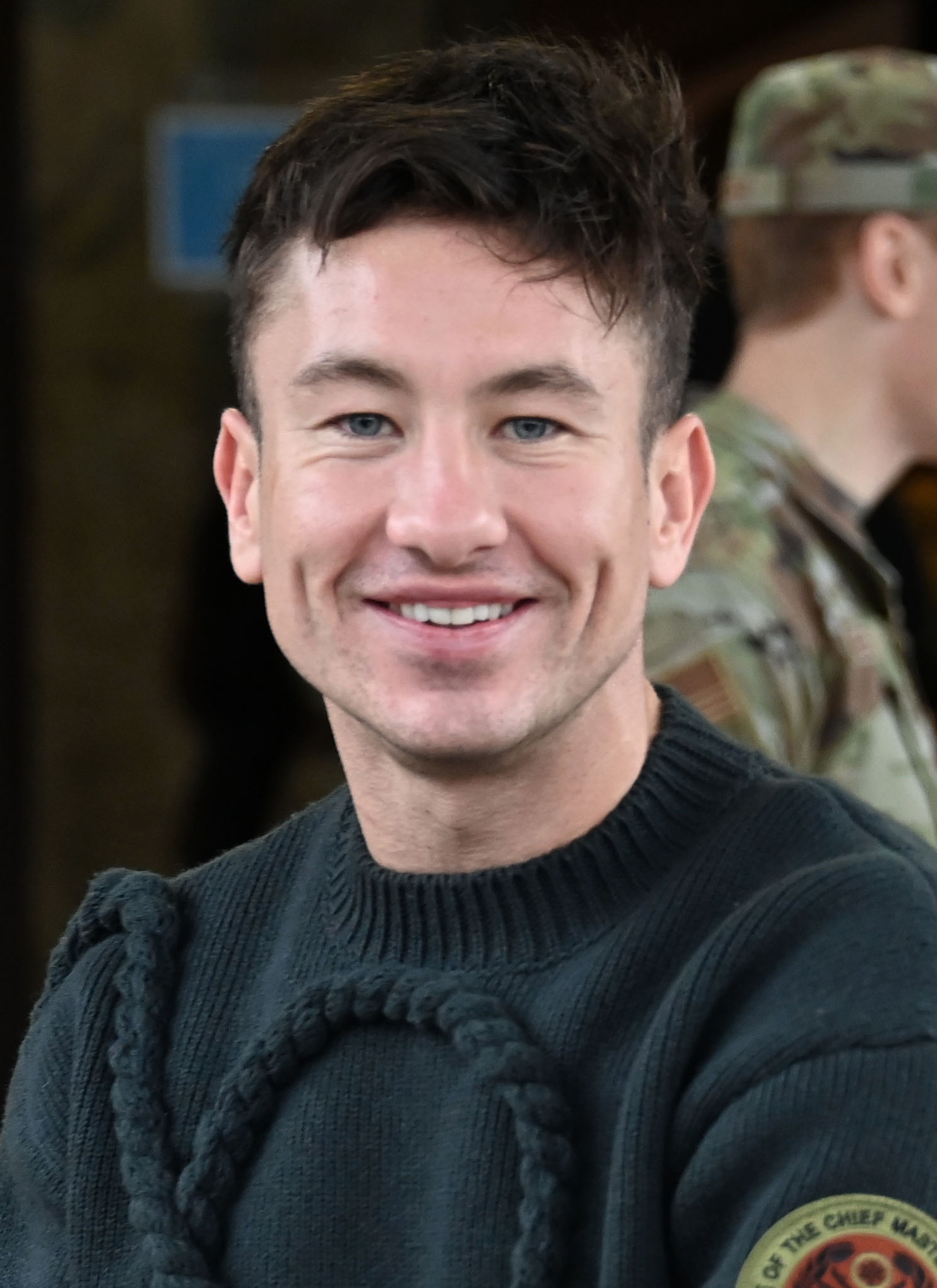
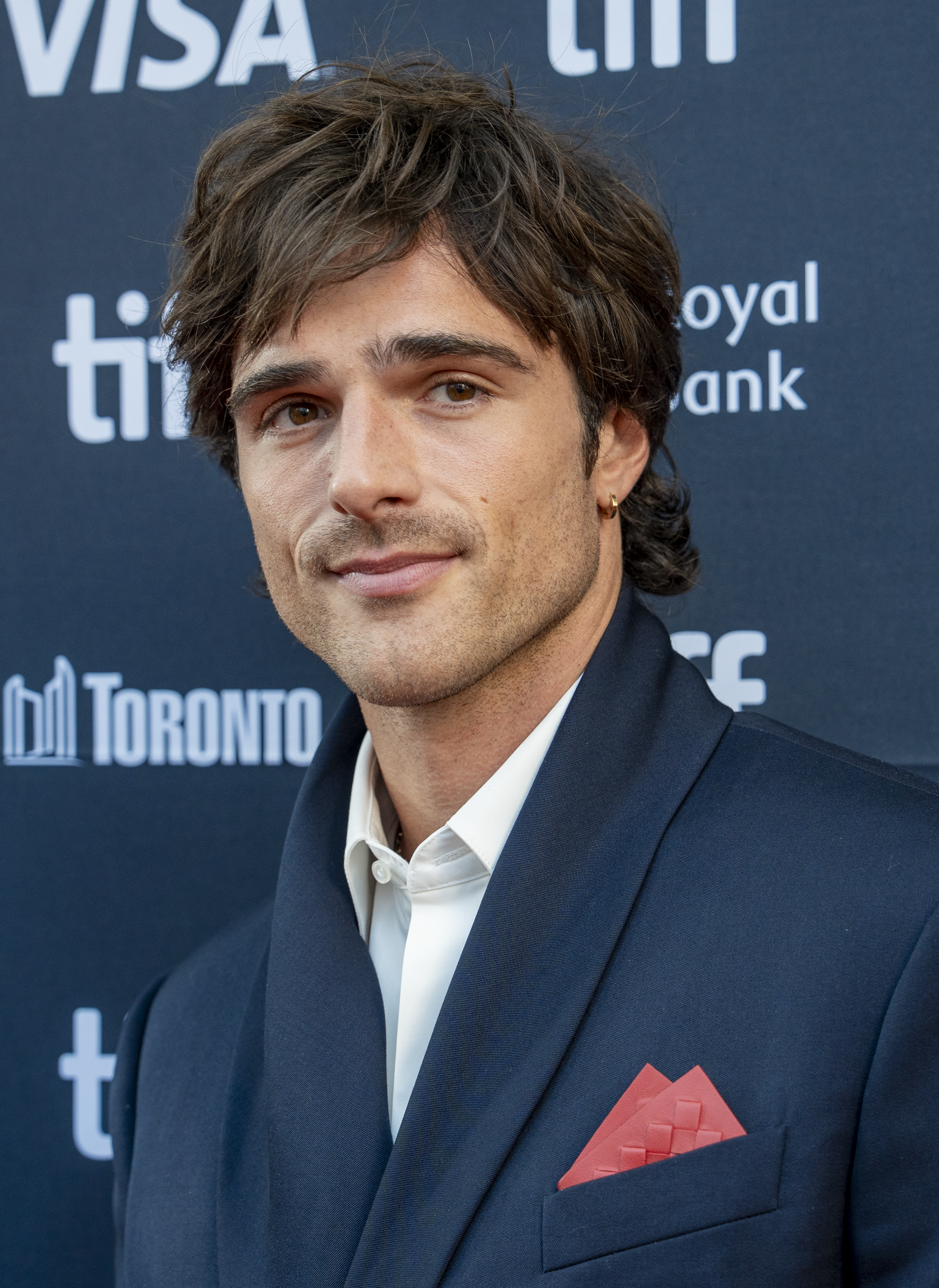
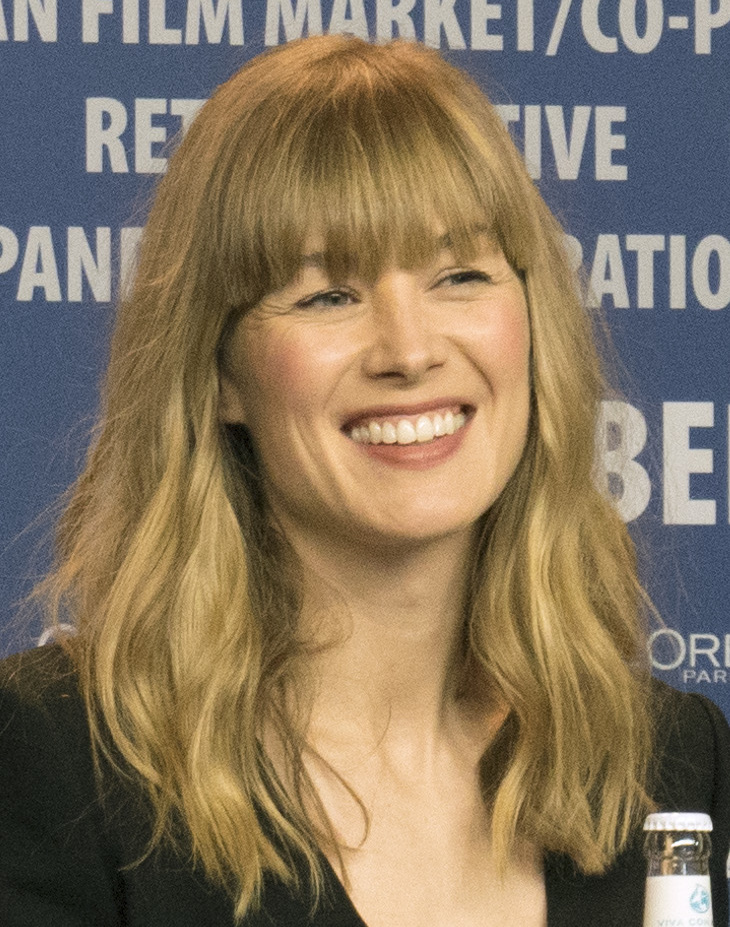
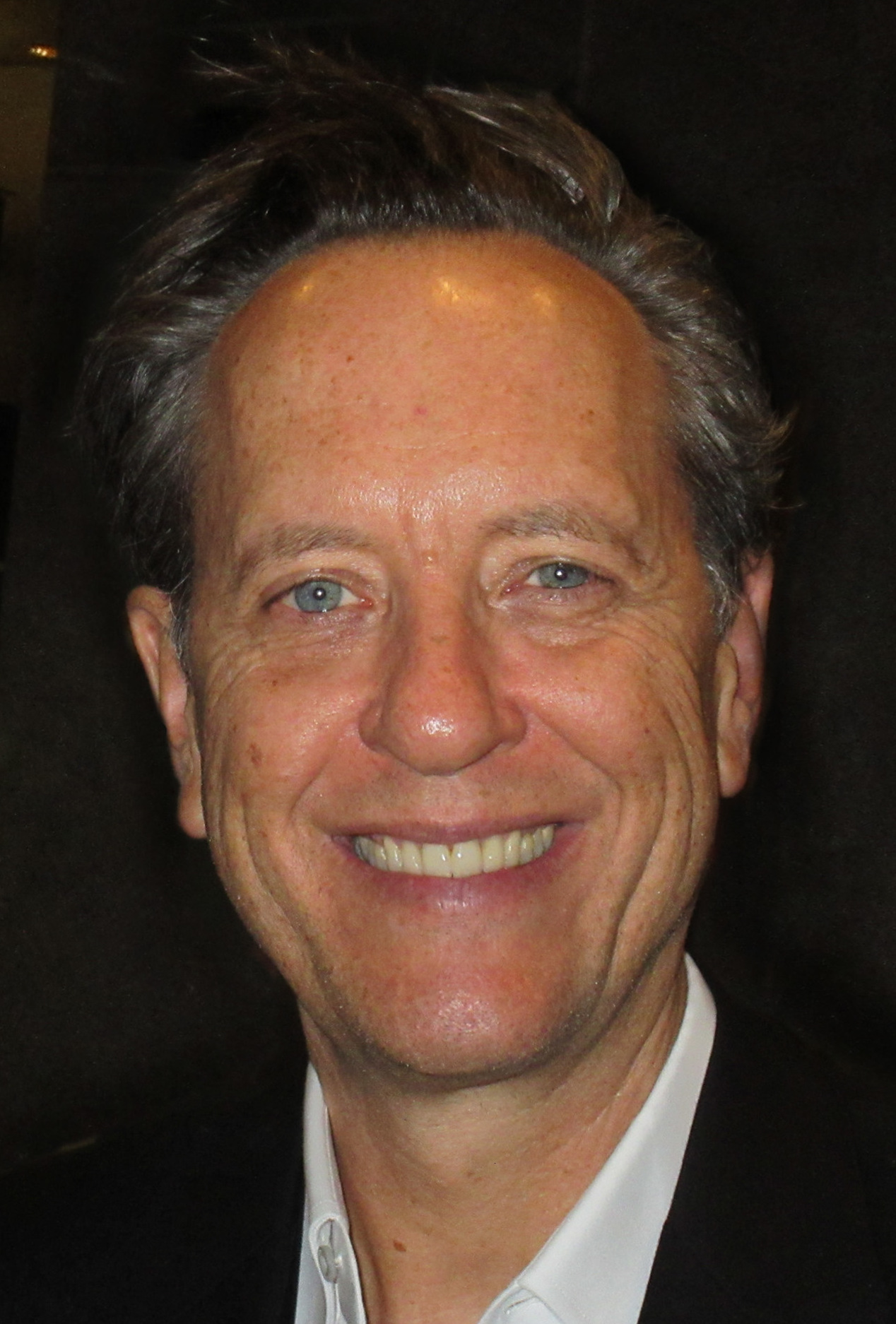
The film's stars: Barry Keoghan, Jacob Elordi, Rosamund Pike, and Richard E. Grant
- Barry Keoghan as Oliver Quick, an Oxford student who apparently comes from a poor background
- Jacob Elordi as Felix Catton, an Oxford student who comes from a wealthy family and befriends Oliver
- Rosamund Pike as Lady Elspeth Catton, Felix's mother
- Richard E. Grant as Sir James Catton, Felix's father
- Alison Oliver as Venetia Catton, Felix's sister
- Archie Madekwe as Farleigh Start, Felix's cousin
- Carey Mulligan as "Poor Dear" Pamela, Elspeth's friend
- Paul Rhys as Duncan, Saltburn's butler
- Ewan Mitchell as Michael Gavey, an Oxford student
- Sadie Soverall as Annabel, an Oxford student
- Millie Kent as India, an Oxford student
- Reece Shearsmith as Professor Ware
- Dorothy Atkinson as Paula Quick, Oliver's mother
- Shaun Dooley as Jeff Quick, Oliver's father
- Lolly Adefope as Lady Daphne
- Joshua McGuire as Henry

== Production ==
=== Development and casting ===
Saltburn is the second film written and directed by Emerald Fennell, after Promising Young Woman (2020). The project was first announced in January 2022, in which it was described as "a story of obsession." In May 2022, Tom Ackerley, Margot Robbie, and Josey McNamara were confirmed as producers, while Rosamund Pike, Jacob Elordi and Barry Keoghan joined the cast. Fennell said that Australian actor Elordi "...did the most exceptional audition... He did such a genius, genius bit of observational comedy. He really really understood that for all of [Felix's] beauty and charisma, he's just sort of a spoiled little boy. He came in and just absolutely blew us all away". Carey Mulligan, star of Promising Young Woman, was revealed to be part of the cast in December 2022.

In writing the film, Fennell wanted to sympathise with unlikeable people, saying

the sorts of people that we can't stand, the sorts of people who are abhorrent—if we can love them, if we can fall in love with these people, if we can understand why this is so alluring, in spite of its palpable cruelty and unfairness and sort of strangeness, if we all want to be there too, I think that's just such an interesting dynamic.

She had long wanted to make her own version of films and books set in a country house, and set the film in 2006 to "really [knock] the fucking glamour off things" by setting it in the recent past.

=== Filming ===
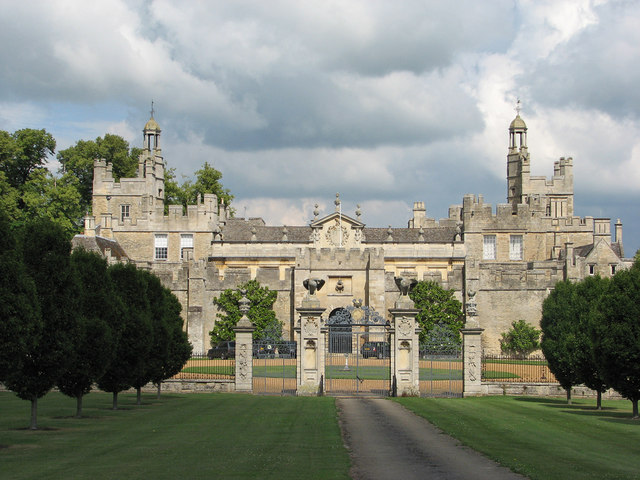
Drayton House in Northamptonshire was used as a primary filming location

Filming began on 16 July 2022, with Linus Sandgren serving as cinematographer. The film is shown in a 4:3 aspect ratio, with Fennell saying it gives the impression of "peeping in".

Fennell was determined not to film in an estate familiar to viewers, and wanted to set the movie in one location, aligning the filming with the film's plot, saying, "It was important to me that we were all in there together, that the making of the film in some way had that feeling of a summer where everyone loses their mind together...I didn't want to be constantly picking up and moving" and avoiding the need for post-production adjustments due to multiple locations. Fennell was successful, with filming occurring at the University of Oxford at Magdalen College, St Hugh's College and Brasenose College and in Drayton House, Northamptonshire, which had never been used for a film before. As part of the contract, no one was allowed to reveal the location of the house or the identity of its owners. Despite the house's opulence, the actors ultimately became familiar with Drayton's interiors over the course of filming and comfortable working in it, in order to convey the idea that this grand location was for their characters completely normal and simply their home.

Costumes were designed with 2000s fashion displayed in the form of ostentatious jackets, rugby shirts, and ostentatious jewellery.

== Music ==
The film is scored by Anthony Willis, who previously scored Fennell's Promising Young Woman. The soundtrack was released by Milan Records on 17 November 2023.

Sophie Ellis-Bextor's 2001 song "Murder on the Dancefloor" was featured in the last scene of the film. As a result, the song received 1.5 million streams on New Year's Eve on Spotify and subsequently re-entered the UK Singles Chart at number eight on 5 January 2024 with 2.2 million streams, marking the song's best-ever streaming week. The film also features Ladytron's 2005 track "Destroy Everything You Touch", Mason and Princess Superstar's 2006 track "Perfect (Exceeder)" and Tomcraft's 2002 track "Loneliness" which, in addition to "Murder on the Dancefloor", became trending songs, particularly on TikTok.

The music in the first scene is Zadok the Priest by George Frideric Handel, a coronation anthem traditionally associated with the coronations of British monarchs. Saltburn was produced during the period of the coronation of Charles III and Camilla, and premiered less than four months after the ceremony.

== Themes and influences ==
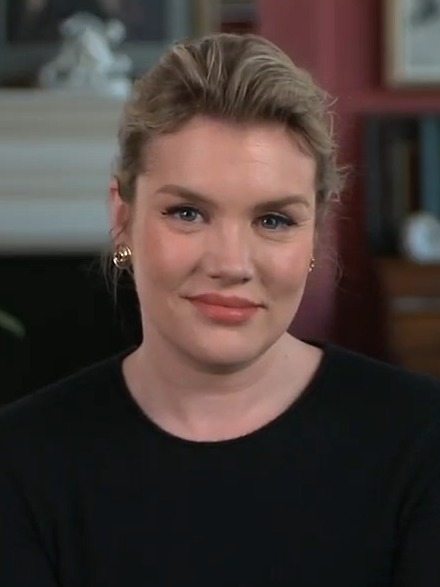
Writer-director Emerald Fennell in a 2023 interview

The film focuses on excess and obsession. Fennell stated "I drew from my own experience of being a human person, who has felt that thing we all feel at that time in our life which is that absolute insane grip of obsessive love...But obviously I didn't quite go to the lengths that some of the people [in the film] do".

Discussing the film's influences, Fennell has cited A Clockwork Orange (1971), Cruel Intentions (1999), Daphne du Maurier's Rebecca (1938), and the novel The Go-Between (1953) by L.P. Hartley and its 1971 film adaptation. She commented, "I think that I was sort of looking more at that British Country House tradition of The Go-Between and that sort of very specific British... sort of Joseph Losey world, where class and power and sex all kind of collide in one specific place". Fennell cited Losey's The Servant (1963) as an influence because of its "undeniable erotic power" that "relies entirely on the threat of violence—not just literal violence, but a complete chaotic upending of the status quo".

Patricia Highsmith's novel The Talented Mr. Ripley (1955) and its film adaptation (1999) have often been cited as an influence by critics due to the common themes of social class and the similarities between Oliver and Tom Ripley, though Fennell herself has downplayed these comparisons. Richard Brody of The New Yorker also found similarities to Brideshead Revisited by Evelyn Waugh. A reviewer for the Australian student magazine Farrago described the film as "the lovechild of Call Me by Your Name (2017) and Parasite (2019)".

Some critics noted that the rich stylisation and visual influences in the film show aesthetic influences from Francis Ford Coppola's Bram Stoker's Dracula (1992) and Stanley Kubrick's The Shining (1980). According to these critics, Fennell's Gothic visual style in general mirrors the mythical elements of Coppola's 1992 Dracula film about otherworldly seduction: the Saltburn garden scene, especially, parallels the carnal possessions of Lucy (Sadie Frost) and Mina (Winona Ryder), who are cosmically drawn to Gary Oldman's Count Dracula. Saltburn has been billed as a sort of "vampire movie" by the filmmaker herself.

Other critics have found similarities to Pier Paolo Pasolini's film Theorem (1968) and Stanley Kubrick's Barry Lyndon (1975), which also addressed themes of class, power, desire, and seduction. Fennell described her satire of the British class system as "Barry Lyndon meets indie sleaze".

== Release ==
Saltburn had its world premiere at the 50th Telluride Film Festival on 31 August 2023. It premiered in the United Kingdom as the opening film of the 67th BFI London Film Festival on 4 October 2023. It also premiered in Australia at SXSW Sydney on 20 October 2023.

Amazon MGM Studios spent $75 million to acquire distribution rights. In the United States, Saltburn was given a limited release on 17 November 2023, followed by a wide release on 22 November. It was originally scheduled to be released a week earlier but was moved to take advantage of the initial positive response it received at its Telluride premiere. Warner Bros. Pictures handled the UK and Ireland release of Saltburn, with a 16 November release in Australia and a 17 November release in the UK.

The film became available to stream worldwide on Amazon Prime Video on 22 December 2023. The film was highly popular on Amazon Prime, becoming one of its top 10 worldwide film debuts, as viewership quadrupled two weeks after its launch. Deadline Hollywood credited the success to the film's viral marketing and word-of-mouth. Saltburn-themed videos amassed nearly 4 billion views on TikTok, with three million influencers and content creators engaging with the film across all platforms and the official Saltburn socials obtaining 153 million views.

== Reception ==
=== Box office ===
Saltburn grossed $11.4 million in the United States and Canada, and $9.7 million in other territories, for a worldwide total of $21.1 million.

In its limited opening weekend, the film made $322,651 from seven theatres. Expanding to 1,566 theatres the following Wednesday, the wide expansion of the film was released alongside Napoleon and Wish, and made $684,000 on its first day of wide release and then $301,000 on Thanksgiving Day. Its debut made $1.8 million on the weekend (and a total of $2.9 million over the five-day frame), finishing in ninth. The film dropped just 16% the following weekend, grossing $1.6 million.

=== Critical response ===
On the review aggregator website Rotten Tomatoes, 72% of 302 critics' reviews are positive, with an average rating of 6.6/10. The website's consensus reads: "Emerald Fennell's candy-coated and incisive Saltburn is a debauched jolt to the senses that will be invigorating for most." Metacritic, which uses a weighted average, assigned the film a score of 61 out of 100, based on 53 critics, indicating "generally favorable" reviews. Audiences surveyed by CinemaScore gave the film an average grade of "B−" on an "A+" to "F" scale, and those polled by PostTrak gave it a 75% overall positive score, and 42% said they would definitely recommend it.

Critic Rex Reed gave the film 4/4 stars in a rave review, writing "The power of Barry Keoghan’s center-ring performance cannot be adequately over-praised" and called it an "intricately palpitating and jaw-dropping performance". He also praised the supporting cast and clever script, saying "As each one (character) comes alive, so does Fennell’s scrupulously disguised screenplay, which stabs the pretentious English class system with a priceless antique knife dipped in potassium cyanide."

Nicholas Barber reviewing for the BBC, enjoyed the "outrageous, laugh-out-loud punchlines" but felt that "Fennell is prone to fumble" plot twists. Barber praised the "superb ensemble cast", especially Keoghan ("magnetic"), Pike ("steals the show"), and Elordi ("a revelation"). He concluded that "if you see it as a lurid pulp fantasy rather than a penetrating satire, then Saltburn is deliriously enjoyable" and awarded it four out of five. Empire also praised the charismatic ensemble cast and gave the film three out of five. In her review, Sophie Butcher reported that "Saltburn looks divine. Fennell's eye is extraordinary, and alongside cinematographer Linus Sandgren, she captures the grand beauty of her architectural locations impeccably" but was disappointed that "scenes often build to reach the cusp of something truly electric, but are let down by clunky dialogue".

Writing in Sight and Sound, Sophie Monks Kaufman found that "the story's superficial treatment of its characters ... becomes increasingly ruinous" and that "the most menacing thing anyone can muster here is a passive-aggressive karaoke choice". She was also underwhelmed by the film's "ostentatious visual language". However, Entertainment Weekly columnist Maureen Lee Lenker gave Saltburn an "A", saying the film is a "Gothic thriller dusted with poisonous candy-pop glitter…Its endless visual and literary layers will bring its ardent admirers back to it again and again, because it is a triumph of the cinema of excess, in all its orgiastic, unapologetic glory." Filmmakers Drew Goddard and Robert Eggers named it as among their favorite films of 2023, with Goddard saying "This is a group of artists who feel safe and protected and emboldened to do truly dangerous work. This only happens when you have a director in complete command of her craft. You can feel Emerald just out of frame, lifting them ever upwards, upwards, upwards. It is staggering, fearless filmmaking. And thank God they’ve asked us to dance with them while the house burns right down around us all."

=== Accolades ===
Award	Date of ceremony	Category	Recipient(s)	Result	Ref.
Mill Valley Film Festival	16 October 2023	Filmmaker of the Year	Emerald Fennell	Won	
Savannah Film Festival	2 November 2023	Audience Award	Saltburn	Won	
Hollywood Music in Media Awards	15 November 2023	Original Score – Feature Film	Anthony Willis	Nominated	
Las Vegas Film Critics Society	13 December 2023	Best Supporting Actress	Rosamund Pike	Nominated	
Las Vegas Film Critics Society	13 December 2023	Best Cinematography	Linus Sandgren	Nominated	
Las Vegas Film Critics Society	13 December 2023	Best Ensemble	Saltburn	Nominated	
Indiana Film Journalists Association	17 December 2023	Best Cinematography	Linus Sandgren	Nominated	
Dublin Film Critics' Circle	18 December 2023	Best Actor	Barry Keoghan	7th Place	
North Texas Film Critics Association	18 December 2023	Best Picture	Saltburn	Nominated	
North Texas Film Critics Association	18 December 2023	Best Director	Emerald Fennell	Nominated	
North Texas Film Critics Association	18 December 2023	Best Actor	Barry Keoghan	Nominated	
North Texas Film Critics Association	18 December 2023	Best Supporting Actress	Rosamund Pike	Nominated	
North Texas Film Critics Association	18 December 2023	Best Cinematography	Linus Sandgren	Nominated	
North Texas Film Critics Association	18 December 2023	Best Newcomer	Allison Oliver	Nominated	
North Texas Film Critics Association	18 December 2023	Garry Murray Award for Best Ensemble	Saltburn	Nominated	
Phoenix Film Critics Society	18 December 2023	Top Ten Films of 2023	Saltburn	Won	
Women Film Critics Circle Awards	18 December 2023	Best Movie by a Woman	Saltburn	Runner-up	
Women Film Critics Circle Awards	18 December 2023	Best Woman Storyteller	Emerald Fennell	Nominated	
Alliance of Women Film Journalists	3 January 2024	Best Actress in a Supporting Role	Rosamund Pike	Nominated	
Alliance of Women Film Journalists	3 January 2024	Best Woman Director	Emerald Fennell	Nominated	
Alliance of Women Film Journalists	3 January 2024	Best Woman Screenwriter	Emerald Fennell	Nominated	
Astra Film and Creative Awards	6 January 2024	Best Actor	Barry Keoghan	Nominated	
Astra Film and Creative Awards	6 January 2024	Best Director	Emerald Fennell	Nominated	
Astra Film and Creative Awards	6 January 2024	Best Original Screenplay	Emerald Fennell	Nominated	
Astra Film and Creative Awards	26 February 2024	Best Cinematography	Linus Sandgren	Nominated	
Astra Film and Creative Awards	26 February 2024	Best Production Design	Suzie Davies and Charlotte Dirickx	Nominated	
Astra Film and Creative Awards	26 February 2024	Best Score	Anthony Willis	Nominated	
Golden Globe Awards	7 January 2024	Best Actor – Motion Picture Drama	Barry Keoghan	Nominated	
Golden Globe Awards	7 January 2024	Best Supporting Actress – Motion Picture	Rosamund Pike	Nominated	
Denver Film Critics Society	12 January 2024	Best Director	Emerald Fennell	Nominated	
Denver Film Critics Society	12 January 2024	Best Lead Performance by an Actor, Male	Barry Keoghan	Nominated	
Denver Film Critics Society	12 January 2024	Best Supporting Performance by an Actor, Female	Rosamund Pike	Nominated	
Denver Film Critics Society	12 January 2024	Best Original Screenplay	Emerald Fennell	Nominated	
Critics' Choice Movie Awards	14 January 2024	Best Picture	Saltburn	Nominated	
Critics' Choice Movie Awards	14 January 2024	Best Cinematography	Linus Sandgren	Nominated	
Critics' Choice Movie Awards	14 January 2024	Best Production Design	Suzie Davies and Charlotte Dirickx	Nominated	
Houston Film Critics Society	22 January 2024	Best Supporting Actress	Rosamund Pike	Nominated	
Houston Film Critics Society	22 January 2024	Best Cinematography	Linus Sandgren	Nominated	
British Society of Cinematographers	3 February 2024	Best Cinematography in a Theatrical Feature Film	Linus Sandgren	Nominated	
London Film Critics' Circle	4 February 2024	Supporting Actress of the Year	Rosamund Pike	Nominated	
London Film Critics' Circle	4 February 2024	British/Irish Performer of the Year	Carey Mulligan (also for Maestro)	Nominated	
London Film Critics' Circle	4 February 2024	Technical Achievement Award	Kharmel Cochrane	Nominated	
AACTA International Awards	10 February 2024	Best Supporting Actor	Jacob Elordi	Nominated	
AACTA International Awards	10 February 2024	Best Supporting Actress	Rosamund Pike	Nominated	
ADG Excellence in Production Design Awards	10 February 2024	Excellence in Production Design for a Contemporary Film	Suzie Davies	Won	
Set Decorators Society of America Awards	13 February 2024	Best Achievement in Décor/Design of a Contemporary Feature Film	Suzie Davies and Charlotte Dirickx	Won	
Society of Composers & Lyricists	13 February 2024	Outstanding Original Score for a Studio Film	Anthony Willis	Nominated	
BAFTA Awards	18 February 2024	Best Actor in a Leading Role	Barry Keoghan	Nominated	
BAFTA Awards	18 February 2024	Best Actor in a Supporting Role	Jacob Elordi	Nominated	
BAFTA Awards	18 February 2024	Best Actress in a Supporting Role	Rosamund Pike	Nominated	
BAFTA Awards	18 February 2024	Best Original Score	Anthony Willis	Nominated	
BAFTA Awards	18 February 2024	Outstanding British Film	Saltburn	Nominated	
People's Choice Awards	18 February 2024	The Movie Performance of the Year	Jacob Elordi	Nominated	
Make-Up Artists and Hair Stylists Guild	18 February 2024	Best Contemporary Make-Up	Siân Miller, Laura Allen	Won	
Make-Up Artists and Hair Stylists Guild	18 February 2024	Best Contemporary Hair Styling	Siân Miller, Laura Allen	Won	
Costume Designers Guild Awards	21 February 2024	Excellence in Contemporary Film	Sophie Canale	Won	
Satellite Awards	3 March 2024	Best Actor – Motion Picture Comedy or Musical	Barry Keoghan	Nominated	
Satellite Awards	3 March 2024	Best Supporting Actress – Motion Picture	Rosamund Pike	Nominated	
Satellite Awards	3 March 2024	Best Cinematography	Linus Sandgren	Nominated	
