= Bad Babysitter =

2002 single by Princess Superstar

Single by Princess Superstar featuring the High & Mighty

from the album Princess Superstar Is
- Released: February 18, 2002
- Genre: Hip hop
- Length: 3:36
- Label: Rapster
- Songwriters: Concetta Kirschner; Erik Meltzer; Milo Berger
- Producer: DJ Mighty Mi

Princess Superstar singles chronology
"Wet! Wet! Wet!" / "Keith N' Me" (2001)	"Bad Babysitter" (2002)	"Keith N' Me" (2002)

Music video
- "Bad Babysitter" on YouTube

"Bad Babysitter" is a song by American rapper and producer Princess Superstar, released on February 18, 2002, through Rapster Records as the second single from her fourth studio album, Princess Superstar Is (2001). The song was written by Princess Superstar (as Concetta Kirschner), Milo Berger, and Erik Meltzer, produced by Milo "DJ Mighty Mi" Berger, and performed by Princess Superstar and the High & Mighty. It was her first single to enter the UK Singles Chart, peaking at number 11 in late February 2002 and spending seven weeks inside the top 75. Worldwide, the song charted in Australia, Flanders, Germany, and Ireland.

== Track listing ==
European CD single
No.	Title	Writer(s)	Producer(s)	Length
1.	"Bad Babysitter" (clean)	C. Kirschner; E. Meltzer; M. Berger	DJ Mighty Mi
2.	"Bad Babysitter" (dirty)	C. Kirschner; E. Meltzer; M. Berger	DJ Mighty Mi
3.	"Bad Babysitter" (clean 45 King Remix)	C. Kirschner; E. Meltzer; M. Berger	DJ Mighty Mi
4.	"Bad Babysitter" (dirty 45 King remix)	C. Kirschner; E. Meltzer; M. Berger	DJ Mighty Mi

== Personnel ==
- Princess Superstar – main artist, songwriter (as Concetta Kirschner), vocals
- Erik Meltzer – featured artist, songwriter, vocals
- Milo Berger – featured artist, songwriter, producer
- Greg Vaughn – mastering
- Raphael Fuchs – photography
- Klaus Dahmen – layout
- Mark James – remixing

== Charts ==
=== Weekly charts ===
Chart (2002)	Peak position
Australia (ARIA)	38
Belgium (Ultratip Bubbling Under Flanders)	14
Europe (Eurochart Hot 100)	67
Germany (GfK)	94
Ireland (IRMA)	29
Scottish Singles Sales (Official Charts)	11
UK Singles (Official Charts)	11
UK Hip Hop/R&B (Official Charts)	3
UK Indie (Official Charts)	2

=== Year-end charts ===
Chart (2002)	Position
UK Singles (OCC)	179
