= RKO/Unique Records =

Former record label

RKO Records and Unique Jazz are two record labels which began in 1955 as Unique Records, a New York City pop music record label. After several small pop hits, such as "Man in the Raincoat" by fourteen-year-old Priscilla Wright, the label was acquired by General Tire subsidiary RKO Teleradio (initially General Teleradio; acquired a majority stake in the Mutual Broadcasting System in 1952, then merged with the RKO Pictures film studio in 1955, resulting in a name change to RKO Teleradio Pictures) in 1957 and placed its owner, Stanley Borden, in charge of its music entertainment division. From 1957 on, the label was billed as RKO/Unique.

In an effort to create entertainment synergy, General Tire initially acquired majority control of Mutual in 1952 through its acquisition of the Yankee Network & the stations that carried it from Shepard Stores, Inc. in 1943 & the Don Lee Broadcasting Network in 1950. Then, in 1952, it added WOR (AM, FM & TV), then consolidated its broadcasting interests into General Teleradio (purchased from R. H. Macy & Company alongside WOR & Bamberger Broadcasting; named as a result of The General Tire & Rubber Company's increased investment in WOR). Then, it acquired the RKO film studio from Howard Hughes in 1955. After selling the studio's backlot to Desilu Productions in 1956, RKO's remaining assets were merged with General Teleradio, forming RKO Teleradio Pictures.

After General Tire's acquisition of Unique Records in 1957, the record label was re-branded as RKO/Unique. Then, General Tire used Mutual in an attempt to enhance RKO/Unique by creating a national audience for the product. Unfortunately, the concept behind the arrangement was that rock and roll music was a passing fad, and that the pop music of the 1920s through the early 1950s would endure. With that in mind, RKO/Unique signed former recording acts like Rudy Vallee, the Harmonicats and Ted Lewis in hopes of recapturing their glorious pasts. To this mix, they added popular movie stars like Herb Jeffries, Edie Adams and Frances Langford, former vaudeville stars (and RKO movie regulars) like the Vagabonds, plus current popular TV stars such as George DeWitt, then the host of the top rated Name That Tune. RKO-Unique also issued the album Music To Suffer By by Leona Anderson.

To cement this relationship, General Tire, through RKO Teleradio Pictures, created the radio program Studio X to carry the RKO/Unique product on Mutual. The result was a disaster. Within a few years (by 1957), both the radio network and the record company were suffering huge financial losses and General Tire divested both of them: Mutual was sold to 3M, while RKO/Unique was sold to an unknown buyer, in 1960.

Years later, in 1965, RKO/Unique was acquired by Reach Entertainment, who revived the label, splitting RKO Records & Unique Jazz into two distinct labels.

However, eventually, Reach Entertainment ceased operations, with RKO Records & Unique Jazz shutting down.

== See also ==
- List of record labels
