= Malente (DJ) =

German DJ, producer and remixer

- Birth name: Christoph Göttsch
- Also known as: Gautsch, ManroX
- Genres: Rock, funk, electro house, deep house, house
- Occupation(s): DJ, producer, remixer
- Instrument(s): Turntables, sampler
- Labels: Southern Fried; Dim Mak; Fool's Good; No Brainer Records; Exploited Records
- Website: www.m-a-l-e-n-t-e.de

Malente (born Christoph Göttsch) is a German DJ, producer and remixer.

== Musical career ==
Since 1999 he released five albums, several 12-inch singles and MP3s / WAVs starting out on Düsseldorf's Label Unique Records. Since 2004 he releases on Hamburg based Moonbootique, on Norman Cook's Southern Fried Records, on A-Trak's Fool's Gold, on Steve Aoki's Dim Mak Records and Malente's own Label No Brainer Records.

In addition to his own productions Malente delivered Remixes for Artists like Armand Van Helden, Moonbootica, Audio Bullys, Foals, Bob Sinclar, Larry Tee and several others. In 2008 he has been voted Top National Act of the German Club Charts (DCC).

1997 till 2001 Göttsch released two Albums and some Singles of samplebased Indie-Pop with German Rapping under the name Gautsch

Starting in 2004 Malente sporadically teams up with Berlin based Lars Moston for DJing and producing as Moston & Malente. Since 2008 he also works with Daniel Dexter AKA Dex of Acidkids. Under Malente&Dex they release some 12-inch singles on Label Exploited Records.

== Discography ==
=== Albums ===
- "Malente" - The Spirit of Malente (Unique Records)
- "Malente" - No Risk No Funk (Unique Records)
- "Malente" - Rip It Up (Unique Records)
- "Malente" - How Can You Still Stand to Stand Still (Unique Records)
- "Malente" - WHOW (Unique Records)

=== Singles ===
- "Malente" - Fertig (Unique Records) 12-inch single
- "Malente" - I Sell Marihuana (Unique Records) 12-inch single
- "Malente" - Don't Stop (Unique Records) 12-inch single
- "Malente" - Funk the Rich (Unique Records) 7-inch single
- "Malente" - Subway E.P. (Limited Promo) 12-inch single
- "Malente" - Till I Die (Unique Records) 12-inch single
- "Malente" - We Came To Party (Unique Records) 12-inch single
- "Moston & Malente" - In The Sky (Moonbootique) 12-inch single
- "Malente" - Axel Fireflies (Limited Promo) 12-inch single
- "Malente" - Washington (Moonbootique) 12-inch single
- "Moston & Malente" - Crowdrock / Tight With You (Moonbootique) 12-inch single
- "Malente" - Dancefloor Whore (Unique Records) 12-inch single
- "Malente" - Like A Freek (Unique Records) 12-inch single
- "Malente" - Hot Daddy (Moonbootique) 12-inch single
- "Malente pres. Manrox" - Theme From Manrox (Luscious Sounds) 12-inch single
- "Moston & Malente" - The 2 And Only (Splank!) 12-inch single
- "Malente" - For The Revolution (Unique Records) 12-inch single
- "Malente" - Killer Applikation (Moonbootique) 12-inch single
- "Malente" - Open Secret (Unique Records) 12-inch single
- "Moston & Will Styles" - James Brown (Fresh Jams) 12-inch single
- "Malente pres. Manrox" - This Manrox (Luscious Sounds) 12-inch single
- "Malente pres. Manrox" - This Manrox (The Remixes) (Luscious Sounds) ( MP3, WAV only )
- "Malente" - WHOW Album Sampler 12-inch single
- "Moston & Malente" - F*cked Up (Splank!) 12-inch single
- "Malente&Dex" - Hyperactive (Exploited) 12-inch single
- "Moston & Malente" - Do The Right Thing (Splank!) 12-inch single
- "Malente" - Bring That Lead Back (Southern Fried) ( MP3, WAV only)
- "Malente" - Music Forever (Southern Fried) 12-inch single
- "Malente&Dex" – Lions / Gipsy Kings (Exploited) ( MP3, WAV only)
- "Malente" - I Like It (Fool's Gold) 12-inch single
- "Malente" - Move Your Body (Unique Records) ( MP3, WAV only)
- "Malente&Dex" – Bangkok feat. Bonde Do Role (Exploited) 12-inch single
- "Malente & Jay Robinson" – Do Your Head In EP (Southern Fried) ( MP3, WAV only)
- "Malente vs Azzido Da Bass" – They’re Killin’ It (Dim Mak) ( MP3, WAV only)
- "Malente&Dex" – Habibi / In Nightclubs / Doo Doo Dance (Exploited) 12-inch single
- "Moston & Malente" - Oh My God (No Brainer Records) ( MP3, WAV only)
- "Malente" – Tarzan Boys EP (Southern Fried) ( MP3, WAV only)
