= Arling & Cameron =

Dutch electronic music duo

Arling & Cameron (sometimes 'A&C') were a Dutch electronic music duo, composed of Gerry Arling (deceased) and Richard Cameron.

Their early music draw from French pop, spy movie themes, lounge, '70s light rock, Japanese Shibuya-kei and other music genres that are often associated with kitsch. Their beat-driven pop collages recalled Pizzicato Five or Cornelius, with whom they also collaborated. With Pizzicato Five they co-wrote the song "Arigato, we love you" on the P5 album 'Happy end of the world'. Later albums incorporated more modern pop, and electro influences as well as rap and dance.

== History ==
Their musical partnership began in 1994, inspired by the Shibuya-kei kitsch-pop deconstructionists that had emerged in Japan several years earlier. They held "Easy Tune" parties around Amsterdam that year; from those performances they culled singles which they released under a variety of pseudonyms (16 in all, including "Popcorn" and "Aloha Sisters") on Cameron's Drive-In/Easy Tune label. Collaborations with Pizzicato Five, Fantastic Plastic Machine, and Bebel Gilberto followed soon after. In 1998, label Emperor Norton released their Voulez Vous EP in the United States as well as their debut album, All-In, in 1999.

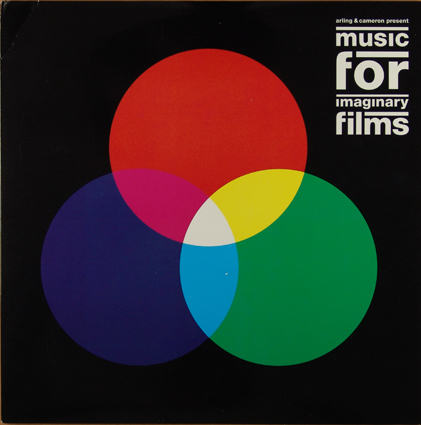
Music for imaginary films cover

In 2000, Arling & Cameron released Music for Imaginary Films, a collection of theme songs for nonexistent movies and TV shows. Working with Joost Swarte, the duo also released Sound Shopping during the same year, featuring French-inspired sample-based songs, with the first track, Fun Shopping, featuring samples of cash registers and high heels. A year later, in April 2001, they released their third album, We Are A&C, a dance-pop record drawing stylistically from smooth R&B, psych, Krautrock and tropicalia-tinged lounge.

Between 2002 and 2010, they cooperated on soundtracks for several feature film projects Oesters van Nam Kee, Boys & Girls Guide To Getting Down, Phileine Says Sorry, Das Jahr der ersten Küsse and Hollywood Sex wars as well as games music for Sony PlayStation (Hot Shot Golf).

In 2006, they released Hi-Fi underground.

Their 2015, album release is GOOD TIMES. An eclectic mix of modern pop and electro and rap. Guest singers on the album include Princess Superstar, FERAL is KINKY, Faberyayo and Nina Hagen.

Gerry Arling died on 20 February 2025, at the age of 63.

== Discography ==
- All-In (1999)
- Music For Imaginary Films (2000)
- Sound Shopping (2000)
- We are A & C (August 2001)
- Hi-Fi Underground (September 2006)
- Good Times (April 2015)
