= Ego Trippin' (song) =

Single by Ultramagnetic MCs

from the album Critical Beatdown
- Released: 1986
- Genre: Hip hop
- Songwriters: Cedric Miller, Keith Matthew Thornton, Maurice Smith
- Producer: Ultramagnetic MCs

"Ego Trippin′" is a 1986 song by Ultramagnetic MCs. The group made a stylistic breakthrough with it; the song boasted dense, minimalist production, featuring erratic lyricism by Ced-Gee and Kool Keith, synthesizer riffs and was the first song to sample Melvin Bliss's "Synthetic Substitution", now one of the most sampled songs of all time.

== Lyricism ==
The Anthology of Rap, published by Yale University Press, makes note of such pseudoscientific terminology in Ced-Gee's lyricism on "Ego Trippin'", particularly the lines "Usin' frequencies and data, I am approximate / Leaving revolutions turning, emerging chemistry / With the precise implications, achieved adversively". Kool Keith's rhymes are manic and expressed in a staccato pace. His lyrics on "Ego Trippin'" also criticize the musical aesthetic of old school hip hop artists at the time: "They use the simple back and forth, the same old rhythm / That a baby can pick up and join right with them / But their rhymes are pathetic, they think they copasetic / Using nursery terms, at least not poetic". It was meant as a Diss to Run-DMC's style and specifically aimed at their song "Peter Piper".

== Use in popular culture ==
- In 1994, De La Soul paid tribute to it by calling their single Ego Trippin' (Part Two), which charted at #47 on the Hot Dance Music/Maxi-Singles Sales, #74 on the Billboard Hot R&B/Hip-Hop Songs chart and #39 on the Hot Rap Singles.
- Ego Trippin' was also paid tribute to by Sway & King Tech on their album This or That, as there was a song on it called "Ego Trippin' '99" which featured Kool Keith and Motion Man.
- "Why R U" by Amerie from the album In Love & War samples this song.
- It was featured in the soundtrack for the video game Tony Hawk's Underground 2.
