= Funk Your Head Up =

Studio album by Ultramagnetic MCs
- Released: March 17, 1992
- Recorded: 1990–1992
- Genre: Hip hop
- Length: 1:09:54
- Label: Mercury; PolyGram
- Producer: TR Love; Moe Love; Kool Keith; Ced-Gee; Charlie Beats; Dr. Jam; The Brothers Of Funk; Phase 5 (co.); Dinky B (co.)

Ultramagnetic MCs chronology
Critical Beatdown (1988)	Funk Your Head Up (1992)	The Four Horsemen (1993)

Professional ratings
Review scores
Source	Rating
AllMusic	2.5/5 stars
The Encyclopedia of Popular Music	3/5 stars
RapReviews	9/10
Spin Alternative Record Guide	5/10

Funk Your Head Up is the second studio album by American hip hop group Ultramagnetic MCs. It was released on March 17, 1992, via Mercury Records/PolyGram.

Many of the tracks were remixed by outside producers at Mercury Records' insistence. The result was an album that disappointed hardcore fans of the group, while doing little to improve their sales. The sole hit single was a Beatminerz remix of "Poppa Large" that was not included on the album.

== Critical reception ==
Trouser Press wrote: "If hip-hop were only about clever lyrics and concrete breakbeats, the UMC’s might have been on top of the world. But next to the street socio-politics of Ice Cube, the gangsta dramatics of Dr. Dre and the shock gimmickry of Geto Boys, Ultramagnetics were beginning to sound nostalgic."

In a retrospective review, The Quietus called the album "flawed but frequently magnificent," writing that the production "redefines the concept of funk for the hip hop era and gives Keith's rhymes, in particular, the sort of blaxploitation-via-sci-fi setting they uniquely demanded."

== Track listing ==
No.	Title	Writer(s)	Producer(s)	Length
1.	"Introduction to the Funk"		DJ Moe Love	0:20
2.	"Intro"	M. Smith; H. Bohannon	DJ Moe Love	2:16
3.	"MC Champion"	C. Miller; T. Randolph; K. Thornton; M. Smith	Ced-Gee; DJ Moe Love (co.); TR Love (co.); Phase 5 (co.)	3:27
4.	"Go 4 Yours"	C. Miller; T. Randolph; K. Thornton; M. Smith	TR Love; Ced-Gee (co.)	2:54
5.	"Blast from the Past"	C. Miller; T. Randolph; K. Thornton; M. Smith	DJ Moe Love	0:42
6.	"Funk Radio"	T. Randolph; K. Thornton; M. Smith	DJ Moe Love; Kool Keith; TR Love (co.)	4:08
7.	"Message from the Boss"	C. Miller; T. Randolph; K. Thornton; M. Smith	Ced-Gee; TR Love (co.)	4:45
8.	"Pluckin' Cards"	W. Patterson; T. Randolph; K. Thornton; M. Smith	Kool Keith; DJ Moe Love (co.)	5:00
9.	"Intermission" (featuring Dr. Jam)		Kool Keith; The Brothers Of Funk; Dr. Jam	0:31
10.	"Stop Jockin Me"	C. McIntosh; W. Patterson; C. Miller; P. Miller; T. Randolph; K. Thornton; M. Smith	TR Love; Dinky B (co.)	4:49
11.	"Dolly and the Rat Trap"	T. Randolph; K. Thornton	Kool Keith	1:49
12.	"The Old School" (featuring The Cold Crush Brothers)	K. Thornton	TR Love; DJ Moe Love (co.)	0:16
13.	"Bust the Facts"	T. Randolph; K. Thornton	Kool Keith	4:52
14.	"Murder and Homicide"	K. Thornton	Kool Keith	0:21
15.	"You Ain't Real"	W. Patterson; C. Miller; T. Randolph; K. Thornton; M. Smith	TR Love; DJ Moe Love (co.)	4:18
16.	"Make it Happen"	T. Blair; J. Brown; C. Miller; T. Randolph; K. Thornton; M. Smith; F. Wesley; W. Patterson; C. Bobbit	Ced-Gee; DJ Moe Love (co.); TR Love (co.); Phase 5 (co.)	4:30
17.	"I Like Your Style"	C. Lewis; C. Miller; T. Randolph; K. Thornton; M. Smith; M. Wiley	Charlie Beats; Ced-Gee (co.)	3:45
18.	"Bi-Lingual Teaching"	K. Thornton	DJ Moe Love; Kool Keith	0:05
19.	"Poppa Large"	C. Miller; K. Thornton	Ced-Gee; Kool Keith; Phase 5 (co.)	4:17
20.	"Moe Love on the 1 and 2"	M. Smith	DJ Moe Love	3:37
21.	"Porno Star" (featuring Tim Dog)	T. Blair; C. Miller; W. Patterson; T. Randolph; K. Thornton; M. Smith	DJ Moe Love; Kool Keith; TR Love (co.)	7:00
22.	"The P.M.R.C. ID"		DJ Moe Love	0:20
23.	"Chorus Line Pt. 2" (featuring Tim Dog)	C. Adams; R. Bell; R. Bell; T. Blair; R. Mickens; C. Miller; T. Randolph; D. Thomas; K. Thornton; M. Smith	Ced-Gee; DJ Moe Love (co.); Kool Keith (co.); TR Love (co.)	5:46
Total length:				1:09:54

== Personnel ==
- Keith Matthew Thornton - main artist, producer
- Maurice Russell Smith - main artist, producer
- Cedric Ulmont Miller - main artist, producer
- Trevor Randolph - main artist, producer
- Timothy Blair - featured artist (tracks: 21, 23)
- Henrik Milling - featured artist & producer (track 9)
- Charles Lewis - producer (track 17)
- Henrik Leif Marquart - co-producer (tracks: 3, 16, 19)
- William "Spaceman" Patterson - guitar (tracks: 10, 15, 16, 21)
- Alli Truch - art direction & design
- Michael Bays - art direction
- Michael Lavine - photography
