= Die in Your Arms =

Promotional single by Justin Bieber

from the album Believe
- Released: May 29, 2012
- Genre: Pop
- Length: 3:56
- Label: Island, RBMG, Schoolboy
- Songwriters: Rodney Jerkins, Dennis "Aganee" Jenkins, Travis Sayles, Thomas Lumpkins, Kelly Lumpkins, Herb Rooney, Alphonso Mizell, Berry Gordy Jr., Deke Richards, Freddie Perren
- Producers: Darkchild, Aganee, Travis Sayles

Justin Bieber promotional singles chronology
"Turn to You (Mother's Day Dedication)" (2012)	"Die in Your Arms" (2012)	"I'll Show You" (2015)

"Die in Your Arms" is a song by Canadian singer Justin Bieber from his third studio album, Believe (2012). The track was written and produced by Rodney "Darkchild" Jerkins, Dennis "Aganee" Jerkins, and Travis Sayles, while additional lyrics were written by Bieber, Thomas Lumpkins, Kelly Lumpkins, and Herb Rooney. The pop song samples Michael Jackson's "We've Got a Good Thing Going" (1972), and lyrically (staff-written), features Bieber singing about an all-consuming passion and the affection that he feels for his love interest. "Die in Your Arms" received mostly positive reviews from music critics, who compared the song's style to the ones of Jackson 5, Duffy and Bruno Mars, among others. The song has charted in several countries such as Australia, Canada, Netherlands, New Zealand, United Kingdom, and United States.

== Background and composition ==
"Die in Your Arms"
A 22-second sample of the song's chorus features Bieber singing over a hip hop beats, finger snaps, melodic piano chords and a sample of Michael Jackson's "We've Got a Good Thing Going". ORIGINAL DRUMSAMPLE = "Melvin Bliss - Synthetic Substitution"

In late 2011, Bieber confirmed to radio network Capital FM that he was recording material for his third studio album, which was originally going to be released in early 2012. He later spoke to MTV News and revealed that Believe would surprise people in different ways, since it musically is a departure from his previous works. "Die in Your Arms" was written and produced by Rodney "Darkchild" Jerkins, Dennis "Aganee" Jerkins, and Travis Sayles, while additional lyrics were written by Bieber, Thomas Lumpkins, Kelly Lumpkins, and Herb Rooney. The track samples Michael Jackson's "We've Got a Good Thing Going" (1972), written by Alphonso Mizell, Berry Gordy Jr., Deke Richards and Freddie Perren, and Melvin Bliss' Synthetic Substitution, written by Herb Rooney. "Die in Your Arms" was released as a promotional single to iTunes Store on May 29, 2012 through The Island Def Jam Music Group.

The pop track incorporates hip hop beats, finger snaps and melodic piano chords in its instrumentation and is similar to early tracks by Jackson 5. Lyrically, "Die in Your Arms" is a song about an all-consuming passion and the affection that Bieber feels for his love interest. During the song's chorus, the singer states, "If I could just die in your arms /I wouldn’t mind / Because every time you touch me / I just die in your arms / It just feels so right." Jason Lipshutz of Billboard deemed it as "a more classically arranged pop offering" when compared to Bieber's previous single "Boyfriend". Leah Collins of the National Post described the song as a "Baby 2.0", adding that "like 'Baby', 'Die in Your Arms' has a certain old-fashioned pop flavour."

== Reception ==
=== Critical response ===
"Die in Your Arms" received mostly positive reviews from music critics. Jon Dolan of Rolling Stone described it as "the sound of Bieber rounding third base, custom-made to get played in Mom's minivan on the way to Little League practice." While Sarah Deen of Metro deemed it as "a laidback pop song", Antoniette Bueno of The Insider noted that the song was written for his female fan base. Bueno added that Bieber also "sounds a lot more like his younger self in this practically guaranteed hit." Rich Juzwiak of Gawker praised "Die in Your Arms", and commented, "the break that Bieber sings over makes me melt in the same way his anime eyes makes little girls melt (Bieber still has them melting, right?). There is an in-your-ear-not-your-mouth joke to be made, but I will refrain because, ugh, I just died in your arms this year, Bieber. Even the robo-melisma doesn't bug. What is happening to me?" Tanar Anitai of MTV compared the song's style to the ones of Duffy, Amy Winehouse, Mark Ronson and Bruno Mars.

Rolling Stone named the track the 45th best song of 2012.

=== Chart performance ===
Following its release on iTunes Store, "Die in Your Arms" reached number three on the store's chart, just behind Carly Rae Jepsen's "Call Me Maybe" (2011) and Gotye's "Somebody That I Used to Know" (2011). After a full week of sales, the track sold a total of 185,000 digital downloads in the United States, debuting at number 4 on the Hot Digital Songs chart. The following week, it plummeted 75 positions to number 92, the third biggest drop in the history of the chart. The song also debuted at number 17 on the Billboard Hot 100. "Die in Your Arms" attained top ten positions in Denmark and Norway, while reaching the top thirty in Ireland and New Zealand, and the top forty in Australia, Scotland, and United Kingdom.

== Live performances ==
Bieber performed "Die in Your Arms" at the Capital FM Summertime Ball 2012. For the performance, he sported fingerless gloves, a Union Jack tank with matching vest, and jeans. The singer also performed the track during a promotional concert in Europe on June 4, 2012, along with "Boyfriend" and "All Around the World".

== Track listing ==
Digital download
No.	Title	Length
1.	"Die in Your Arms"	3:57

US Promo
No.	Title	Length
1.	"Die in Your Arms"	3:57

== Credits and personnel ==
- Written and composed by Rodney Jerkins, Dennis Jenkins, Travis Sayles, Thomas Lumpkins, Kelly Lumpkins and Justin Bieber
- Produced by Rodney Jerkins, Dennis Jenkins and Travis Sayles
- Vocals produced by Kuk Harrell, Chris O'Ryan and Matt Champlin
- Recorded at 2nd Floor Studios, Los Angeles, CA and Record Plant, Los Angeles, CA
- Mixed by Manny Morroquin, Chris Galland, Delbert Bowers, Matt Champlin and Rodney Jerkins at Larrabee Studios, Universal City, CA
- Background vocals: Justin Bieber, Thomas Lumpkins and Greg Morgan
- Bass: Artie Reynolds III
- Live harpsichord, piano and drums: Rodney Jerkins
- Strings and piano: Travis Sayles
- Drums: Aganee

The song included a sample of the recording "We Got a Good Thing Going" performed by Michael Jackson and samples of the recording "Synthetic Substitution" performed by Melvin Bliss.

== Charts ==
Chart (2012)	Peak position
Australia (ARIA)	31
Belgium (Ultratop 50 Flanders)	47
Belgium (Ultratip Bubbling Under Wallonia)	32
Canada (Canadian Hot 100)	14
Denmark (Tracklisten)	9
France (SNEP)	63
Ireland (IRMA)	28
Netherlands (Single Top 100)	41
Norway (VG-lista)	6
New Zealand (Recorded Music NZ)	21
Scotland (OCC)	38
Spain (PROMUSICAE)	50
UK Singles (OCC)	34
US Billboard Hot 100	17

== Certifications ==
Region	Certification	Certified units/sales
Australia (ARIA)	Gold	35,000^{‡}
United States (RIAA)	Gold	500,000^{‡}
^{‡} Sales+streaming figures based on certification alone.

== Release history ==
Region	Date	Format	Label
Worldwide	May 29, 2012	Digital download	The Island Def Jam Music Group
