= Critical Beatdown =

Studio album by Ultramagnetic MCs
- Released: October 4, 1988
- Recorded: 1986–1988
- Genre: Hip-hop
- Length: 50:01
- Label: Next Plateau
- Producers: Ultramagnetic MCs; Paul C; Ced-Gee

Ultramagnetic MCs chronology
| Critical Beatdown (1988) | Funk Your Head Up (1992) |

Singles from Critical Beatdown
- 1. "Ego Trippin'" Released: 1986; 2. "Travelling at the Speed of Thought" Released: 1987; 3. "Funky" Released: 1987; 4. "Watch Me Now" Released: 1988; 5. "Ease Back" Released: 1988; 6. "Give the Drummer Some" Released: 1989

Critical Beatdown is the debut studio album by American hip hop group Ultramagnetic MCs, released on October 4, 1988, by Next Plateau Records. The album was produced primarily by the group's rapper and producer Ced-Gee, who employed an E-mu SP-1200 sampler as the album's main instrument. Music journalists have noted the album for its innovative production, funk-based samples, self-assertive themes, and clever lyrical rhymes by Ced-Gee and rapper Kool Keith.

Although it charted modestly on release, Critical Beatdown has since been acclaimed by critics as a classic album of hip hop's "golden age" and new school aesthetic. The album's abstract rhymes in strange syncopations laid on top of sampling experiments proved widely influential, from Public Enemy to gangsta rap to several generations of underground hip hop artists. Critical Beatdown was reissued by Roadrunner Records in 2004, with additional tracks.

== Background ==
Before forming as a hip hop group, Ultramagnetic MCs members Cedric "Ced-Gee" Miller, "Kool" Keith Thornton, DJ Moe Love (Maurice Smith), and TR Love (Trevor Randolph) from The Bronx, New York were break dancers for the New York City Breakers and People's Choice crews. They recorded a demo, "Space Groove", in 1984 and released their first single "To Give You Love" in 1985. Other singles, including "Space Groove" and "Something Else", became popular at block parties and earned the group notice in the underground music scene, eventually leading to the group's signing with dance-oriented record label Next Plateau Records.

The group made a stylistic breakthrough with their subsequent 1986 single "Ego Trippin'". The song's dense, minimalist production featured synthesizer riffs and a drum sample from Melvin Bliss' 1973 song "Synthetic Substitution", and erratic lyricism by Ced-Gee and Kool Keith. The group's 1987 single "Funky" showcased Ced-Gee expanding on his production style, incorporating a piano sample from "Woman to Woman" by Joe Cocker. Before the release of Critical Beatdown, he contributed production on albums such as Paid in Full (1987) by Eric B. & Rakim and Criminal Minded (1987) by Boogie Down Productions.

== Music and lyrics ==
"Ease Back"
The track features Kool Keith's and Ced-Gee's abstract braggadocio and a sound that encompasses a reversed sample of the whistling saxophone from "The Grunt" by The J.B.'s, a chopped-up breakbeat by DJ Moe Love, and a keyboard sample from The Meters' "Little Old Money Maker".

"Ego Trippin'"
The track's stream-of-consciousness lyrics exhibit complex polyrhythms, while its beat has been described by one writer as "a mosaic of hacks and howls that sound as if they could suddenly disappear under the monstrous beat".

"When I Burn"
Kool Keith's lyrics on the track feature pseudoscientific imagery and metaphors, including allusions to combustion and corrosion.

The dynamic, choppy sound featured on Critical Beatdown was produced primarily by Ced-Gee, who used an E-mu SP-1200 sampler. His sampling of early recordings by James Brown, particularly their guitar and vocal parts, added to the music's abrasive, funk-oriented sound and exemplified the growing popularity of such sampling sources in hip hop at the time. Along with samples of Brown's music, the production utilized drum breaks from commonly sampled sources such as Melvin Bliss' "Synthetic Substitution". In the second edition of The Rough Guide to Hip-Hop (2005), music journalist Peter Shapiro notes its music's energy as reminiscent of the Cold Crush Brothers and writes of the album's musical significance, "It may have been a stunning explosion of early sampling technology, but Critical Beatdown remains a devastating album even in an age of 32-bit samplers and RAM-intensive sound-editing software." He also views that the technological limitations of using such a sampler added to the album's style, making the music "rawer, more immediate, and more febrile, like a raw nerve."

Hip hop production team the Bomb Squad has cited the album as a major influence on their production for Public Enemy's 1988 album It Takes a Nation of Millions to Hold Us Back. Music journalist Jeff Chang writes that Ced-Gee "pushe[d] sampling technology to its early limits, providing sonics that are less bassy and more breakbeat heavy than most of their contemporaries." Shapiro dubs it one of the greatest hip hop albums and comments on its musical legacy, "Recorded at a time before 'street' and 'experimental' were mutually exclusive terms, it ushered in hip-hop's sampladelic golden age and laid the foundation for several generations of underground rap."

Kool Keith and Ced-Gee's lyrics on the album are characterized by abstract braggadocio, stream-of-consciousness narrative style, and pseudoscientific terminology. The Anthology of Rap, published by Yale University Press, makes note of such terminology in Ced-Gee's lyricism on the album's 1986 single "Ego Trippin'", particularly the lines "Usin' frequencies and data, I am approximate / Leaving revolutions turning, emerging chemistry / With the precise implications, achieved adversively". Kool Keith's rhymes are manic and expressed in a staccato pace. His lyrics on "Ego Trippin'" also criticize the musical aesthetic of old school hip hop artists at the time: "They use the simple back and forth, the same old rhythm / That a baby can pick up and join right with them / But their rhymes are pathetic, they think they copasetic / Using nursery terms, at least not poetic".

== Critical reception ==
Retrospective professional ratings
Review scores
| Source | Rating |
|---|---|
| AllMusic | 5/5 stars |
| Blender | 4/5 stars |
| Muzik | 9/10 |
| NME | 9/10 |
| Pitchfork | 9.7/10 |
| Rolling Stone | 4/5 stars |
| The Rolling Stone Album Guide | 4.5/5 stars |
| Select | 4/5 |
| The Source | 5/5 stars |
| Spin Alternative Record Guide | 9/10 |

AllMusic editor Stanton Swihart found the production innovative and deemed Critical Beatdown "an undeniable hip-hop classic [...] one of the finest rap albums from the mid- to late-'80s 'new school' in hip-hop." He noted the "lyrical invention" of Kool Keith and Ced-Gee's respective styles, adding that "Somewhere in the nexus between the two stylistic extremes, brilliant music emanated. Critical Beatdown maintains all its sharpness and every ounce of its power, and it has not aged one second since 1988." Writing for Trouser Press, Jeff Chang called it "an amazing debut" and complimented Kool Keith's "shifty rhyme patterns". Pitchfork's Alex Linhardt called it "a flawless album—one that stands tall today as one of Golden Age's most ageless," lauding Kool Keith's "lyrical ingenuity" and citing Ced-Gee as "the source of the album's most insane, digitalk-quantum gibberish, spouting lines [...] [T]hey should be studied in seminars alongside general relativity." Linhardt attributed its music's "surging psychosis" to DJ Moe Love's turntablism and Ced-Gee's dense funk sampling, particularly his arrangement of vocal samples, writing that they "are ingrained in the very fabric of the beat, concealed and crippled amidst the relentlessly fuzzing bass. And like most great rap albums, many of them come from the patron saint of yelps, James Brown, and flurry and flux with such abstraction and chaos that they make the beats feel deceptively fast-paced."

Melody Maker stated in a retrospective review, "full of scratch-tastic heavy beat, gold plated hip hop which manages to combine the minimalist ground-breaking Sugar Hill sounds with the show-no-mercy aural assault of the then-emerging Public Enemy." NME critic Angus Batey called it "a bona fide classic." Sputnikmusic's Louis Arp noted the group's sound as "developed solely around the sampler" and stated, "Critical Beatdown's notoriety as one of hip-hop's first copyright offenders is more than slightly impressive ... Those grooves, the lyrics and the all around unique feel of the album make for some innovating hip-hop." Arp commented that the album "marks a sign of hip-hop's early burgeoning creative maturity" and praised Ced-Gee's "method of chopping up samples, rather than simply looping them like most of his contemporaries did, essentially changed the way the producer approached the hip-hop beat". Rolling Stone writer Peter Relic cited it as the group's "quintessential release." Colin Larkin, writing in The Encyclopedia of Popular Music, said that it "served as a direct influence on the 'Daisy Age' rap of subsequent acts such as De La Soul and PM Dawn", while singles such as "Give the Drummer Some" showed the Ultramagnetic MCs "in their best light: call and response raps demonstrating individual members self-espoused talent in the best traditions of the old school." In The Rolling Stone Album Guide (2004), journalist Kembrew McLeod called the album "a bona fide classic of hip-hop's 'golden age' of the late '80s and early '90s, an album that was mostly ignored at the time but whose reputation has grown exponentially in the years since."

== Track listing ==
All tracks are written by Cedric Miller, Keith Thornton, Maurice Smith and Trevor Randolph.

| No. | Title | Producer(s) | Length |
|---|---|---|---|
| 1. | "Watch Me Now" | Ced-Gee; Ultramagnetic MCs | 4:49 |
| 2. | "Ease Back" | Ced-Gee; Ultramagnetic MCs | 3:24 |
| 3. | "Ego Trippin'" (MC's Ultra Remix) | Ced-Gee; Ultramagnetic MCs | 2:32 |
| 4. | "Moe Luv's Theme" | Ced-Gee; Ultramagnetic MCs | 2:20 |
| 5. | "Kool Keith Housing Things" | Ced-Gee; Ultramagnetic MCs | 3:16 |
| 6. | "Travelling at the Speed of Thought" (Remix/Part 2) | Ced-Gee; Ultramagnetic MCs | 1:52 |
| 7. | "Feelin' It" | Ced-Gee; Ultramagnetic MCs | 3:32 |
| 8. | "One Minute Less" | Ced-Gee; Ultramagnetic MCs | 1:58 |
| 9. | "Ain't It Good to You" | Ced-Gee; Ultramagnetic MCs | 3:33 |
| 10. | "Funky" (Remix/Part 2) | Ced-Gee; Ultramagnetic MCs | 3:42 |
| 11. | "Give the Drummer Some" | Paul C | 3:43 |
| 12. | "Break North" | Ced-Gee; Ultramagnetic MCs | 3:24 |
| 13. | "Critical Beatdown" | Ced-Gee; Ultramagnetic MCs | 3:43 |
| 14. | "When I Burn" | Ced-Gee; Ultramagnetic MCs | 2:33 |
| 15. | "Ced-Gee (Delta Force One)" | Ced-Gee; Ultramagnetic MCs | 2:47 |
| Total length: | | | 47:08 |

2004 edition
| No. | Title | Producer(s) | Length |
|---|---|---|---|
| 1. | "Watch Me Now" | Ced-Gee; Ultramagnetic MCs | 4:47 |
| 2. | "Ease Back" | Ced-Gee; Ultramagnetic MCs | 3:24 |
| 3. | "Ego Trippin'" (Remastered 12" Version) | Ced-Gee; Ultramagnetic MCs | 5:26 |
| 4. | "Moe Luv's Theme" | Ced-Gee; Ultramagnetic MCs | 2:14 |
| 5. | "Kool Keith Housing Things" | Ced-Gee; Ultramagnetic MCs | 3:15 |
| 6. | "Travelling at the Speed of Thought" (Remix/Part 2) | Ced-Gee; Ultramagnetic MCs | 1:51 |
| 7. | "Feelin' It" | Ced-Gee; Ultramagnetic MCs | 3:31 |
| 8. | "One Minute Less" | Ced-Gee; Ultramagnetic MCs | 1:58 |
| 9. | "Ain't It Good to You" | Ced-Gee; Ultramagnetic MCs | 3:33 |
| 10. | "Funky" (Remix/Part 2) | Ced-Gee; Ultramagnetic MCs | 3:40 |
| 11. | "Give the Drummer Some" | Paul C | 3:43 |
| 12. | "Break North" | Ced-Gee; Ultramagnetic MCs | 3:24 |
| 13. | "Critical Beatdown" | Ced-Gee; Ultramagnetic MCs | 3:42 |
| 14. | "When I Burn" | Ced-Gee; Ultramagnetic MCs | 2:32 |
| 15. | "Ced-Gee (Delta Force One)" | Ced-Gee; Ultramagnetic MCs | 2:49 |
| 16. | "Funky" (Original 12" Version) | Ced-Gee; Ultramagnetic MCs | 4:47 |
| 17. | "Bait" (Original 12" Version/Original Full Length) | Ced-Gee; Ultramagnetic MCs | 4:26 |
| 18. | "A Chorus Line" (Original 12" Version) (featuring Tim Dog) | Ced-Gee; Ultramagnetic MCs | 6:04 |
| 19. | "Travelling at the Speed of Thought" (Remix/Part 2) (Hip House Club Mix) | Paul C | 4:22 |
| 20. | "Ego Trippin'" (Bonus beats) | Ced-Gee; Ultramagnetic MCs | 1:11 |
| 21. | "Mentally Mad" (Original 12" Version) | Ced-Gee; Ultramagnetic MCs | 5:05 |

== Personnel ==
Credits for Critical Beatdown adapted from Allmusic.

- Carlton Batts – mastering
- Janette Beckman – photography
- Ced-Gee – engineer, producer, vocals
- Kool Keith – vocals
- Andre Harrell – executive producer
- Kimberly Brathwaite Moore – production coordination
- Paul C – producer

== Charts ==
| Chart (1989) | Peak position |
|---|---|
| US Billboard Top Black Albums | 57 |

== See also ==
- Golden age hip hop

== Bibliography ==
- Bradley, Adam; DuBois, Andrew, eds. (2010). The Anthology of Rap. Yale University Press. ISBN 978-0-300-14190-0.
- Cobb, William Jelani (2007). To the Break of Dawn: A Freestyle on the Hip Hop Aesthetic. New York University Press. ISBN 978-0-8147-1670-0.
- Coleman, Brian (2007). Check the Technique: Liner Notes for Hip-Hop Junkies. Villard Books. ISBN 978-0-8129-7775-2.
- Fernando, S. H. Jr. (1995). "Ultramagnetic MCs". In Weisbard, Eric; Marks, Craig (eds.). Spin Alternative Record Guide. Vintage Books. ISBN 0-679-75574-8.
- Freeman, Phil, ed. (2007). Marooned: The Next Generation of Desert Island Discs. Da Capo Press. ISBN 0-306-81485-4.
- Jenkins, Sacha; Wilson, Elliott; Mao, Chairman; Alvarez, Gabriel; Rollins, Brent (1999). Ego Trip's Book of Rap Lists. St. Martin's Griffin. ISBN 0-312-24298-0.
- Larkin, Colin, ed. (2006). The Encyclopedia of Popular Music. Vol. 8 (4th ed.). Oxford University Press. ISBN 0195313739.
- McLeod, Kembrew (2004). "Ultramagnetic MC's". In Brackett, Nathan; Hoard, Christian (eds.). The New Rolling Stone Album Guide (4th ed.). Simon & Schuster. ISBN 0-7432-0169-8.
- Shapiro, Peter (2003). "Ultramagnetic MCs: Critical Beatdown". In Wang, Oliver (ed.). Classic Material: The Hip-Hop Album Guide. ECW Press. ISBN 978-1-55022-561-7.
- Shapiro, Peter (2005). The Rough Guide to Hip-Hop (2nd ed.). Rough Guides. ISBN 1-84353-263-8.
