= The Basement Tapes 1984–1990 =

Compilation album by Ultramagnetic MCs
- Released: 1994
- Recorded: 1984–1994
- Genre: Hip hop
- Label: Tuff City
- Producer: Ced Gee, Aaron Fuchs

Ultramagnetic MCs chronology
The Four Horsemen (1993)	The Basement Tapes 1984–1990 (1994)	New York What Is Funky (1996)

Professional ratings
Review scores
Source	Rating
RapReviews	5/10

The Basement Tapes 1984–1990 is a compilation album by the Ultramagnetic MCs. It features the very first studio and home recordings made by the group, as well as early unreleased songs and one new track, "Smoking Dust." Many of the tracks suffer from poor sound quality, their source being deteriorated cassette tapes. "Ced-G, Tim Dog (Lab Freestyle)" and "Ya Not That Large" are not on the vinyl release.

== Track listing ==
1. "Make You Shake (Original Lab House Demo)"
2. "Space Groove"
3. "Get a Job"
4. "Ced-G, Tim Dog (Lab Freestyle)"
5. "Smack My Bitch Up"
6. "Ya Not That Large"
7. "You Got to Feel It"
8. "Crush, Kill, Destroy"
9. "Brainiac"
10. "Scientist"
11. "We're Ultra (Part III)"
12. "Ya Nobody"
13. "Ya Sleepin'"
14. "Smoking Dust"
