= New God Flow =

2012 single by Kanye West and Pusha T

Single by Kanye West and Pusha T (Note: Ghostface Killah only appears on the album version.)

from the album Cruel Summer
- Released: July 2, 2012
- Studio: Jungle City, New York City
- Genre: Hip-hop
- Length: 4:55 (single version); 5:57 (album version)
- Label: GOOD; Def Jam
- Songwriters: Kanye West; Terrence Thornton; Dennis Coles; Ronald Bean; Highleigh Crizoe; Herb Rooney; G.I. Townsend; Marcos Valle
- Producers: Kanye West; Boogz; Tapez; Anthony Kilhoffer

Pusha T singles chronology
"Exodus 23:1" (2012)	"New God Flow" (2012)	"Dope Bitch" (2012)

Kanye West singles chronology
"I Wish You Would" (2012)	"New God Flow" (2012)	"Birthday Song" (2012)

GOOD Music singles chronology
"Cold" (2012)	"New God Flow" (2012)	"Clique" (2012)

"New God Flow" is a song by American rappers Kanye West and Pusha T. It was released on July 2, 2012, through GOOD Music and Def Jam Recordings, as the third single from the compilation album Cruel Summer (2012), a collaboration between members of their record label GOOD Music. Produced by West, Boogz, Tapez, and Anthony Kilhoffer, "New God Flow" incorporates numerous samples into its arrangement, including "Mighty Healthy" (2000) by Ghostface Killah and "Synthetic Substitution" (1973) by Melvin Bliss. Lyrically, "New God Flow" consists of a spiritual perspective akin to Pusha T's single "Exodus 23:1" (2012), believing that there's a God above him while using the same perspective outside of spiritual areas. He references his drug-dealing past, trips to Ibiza, and car collection, while West makes references to his Nike Air Yeezy sneakers, Chicago's youth-violence epidemic at the time, and Biblical figures. The song also includes lines by Pusha T directed at American rapper and record producer Birdman.

"New God Flow" received positive reviews from music critics, with one considering the song to be a strong highlight from Cruel Summer, and another complimenting the rappers' anger and vulnerability throughout the song. Commercially, it appeared on the US Billboard Hot 100 at number 89, the US Hot R&B/Hip-Hop Songs chart at number 43, and the Canadian Hot 100 at number 66. Ghostface Killah, whose song "Mighty Healthy" is prominently sampled in the song, is featured on an alternate version entitled "New God Flow.1" that appears on Cruel Summer. West debuted the song live during an a cappella performance at the 2012 BET Awards, and it was later performed with Pusha T at a concert in Atlantic City and Jay-Z's Made in America Festival. The song was awarded Best Beat at the XXL Awards in 2013.

== Background ==
West and Pusha T's relationship dates back to 2005, when the former appeared on an unreleased Clipse track. Subsequently, he performed on and produced Clipse's single "Kinda Like a Big Deal" (2009). Following the rap duo's breakup, West and Pusha T's professional relationship became more prominent, with the latter signing to GOOD Music and appearing on "Runaway" and "So Appalled" from the former's studio album My Beautiful Dark Twisted Fantasy (2010). Pusha T released his debut project Fear of God II: Let Us Pray (2011) through the record label the following year.

West first announced plans for a GOOD Music album in October 2011 via his Twitter account. In May 2012, the title was revealed as Cruel Summer along with the announcement of the short film of the same name, which later debuted at the Cannes Film Festival that year. Prior to "New God Flow", the Cruel Summer debut single "Mercy" was first released on West's official website on April 6, following a preview by Funkmaster Flex's Hot 97 radio show. It was subsequently released to the iTunes Store later that day. "Cold", the second single from the compilation album, was previewed on New York City radio station Hot 97 by Funkmaster Flex on April 4. It was subsequently released to iTunes on April 17.

== Music and lyrics ==
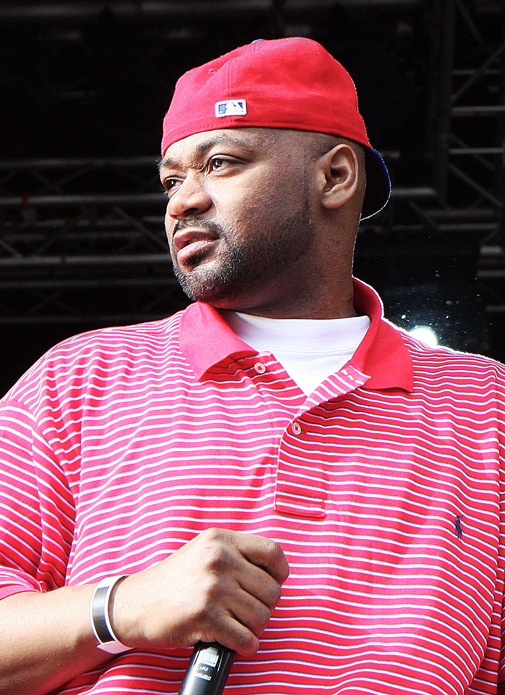
"New God Flow" features a sample of "Mighty Healthy" (2000) by Ghostface Killah. The album version of the song features a verse from him.

The hook of "New God Flow" is made from a vocal sample of "Mighty Healthy" (2000) as performed by Ghostface Killah, which says "Shake that body, party that body / Come and have a good time with G.O.D.". It was later sampled by Madlib in West's 2016 single "No More Parties in LA" from his album The Life of Pablo. On the album version, there is a verse from Ghostface Killah, replacing Kanye West's GOOD Music chant. Other samples used throughout the song include Marcos Valle's "Bôdas de Sangue", a drum break from Melvin Bliss' "Synthetic Substitution" (1973), and Reverend G. I. Townsend's "Sermon Fragment". The single version of the song lasts for nearly five minutes, while the album version extends it by a minute.

Eric Arredondo of Beats Per Minute describes the song's instrumental as "methodical, but fierce at the same time", giving space to the rappers' lyrics. Over an "ominous piano loop" in the style of the composition Moonlight Sonata, Pusha T begins the song with a spiritual verse based on his 2012 single "Exodus 23:1", claiming that he believes that there's a God above him, and that he's just the "God above everything else". He then references his drug-dealing past, trips to Ibiza, and exotic car collection. Additionally, he describes both himself and West as "the new powerhouse team" with comparison to rappers Diddy and Shyne in 1999.

In Pusha T's second verse, he aggravates his rivals similar to the approach of "Exodus 23:1". On West's verse, he raps "Hold up, I ain't tryna stunt, man/But the Yeezys jumped over the Jumpman", referencing the popularity of his Nike Air Yeezy shoes in comparison to that of the Air Jordan brand. Lyrically, he lists three dreams as The Notorious B.I.G., Martin Luther King Jr., and Rodney King, and references the youth-violence epidemic in Chicago at the time. Around the near closure of the song, the beat shifts into a characteristic reminiscent of a stadium chant as West references the Biblical figures Moses, Jacob, and Jesus.

Pusha T explained that the origins of "New God Flow" were based on taking things personally, including interviews in magazines, such as comments suggesting that GOOD Music "ain't nothing". He explained that his sensitivity to the remarks inspired the song. However, he added that he never takes things so personally that he sends direct "fuck yous" to anyone. He additionally confirmed that the song served as a response to a Birdman interview where the rapper dissed GOOD Music.

== Release and commercial performance ==
On June 27, 2012, West's website was updated for the cover art for "New God Flow". The artwork is styled in black and red, revealing track info and key participants. The cover art's style is identical to that of earlier Cruel Summer single "Mercy". On July 2, "New God Flow" was released on West's website, following an a cappella performance at the 2012 BET Awards the previous night.

"New God Flow" was released to the iTunes Store on July 20 through GOOD Music and Def Jam Recordings. Upon its release, the song peaked at number 89 on the Billboard Hot 100, and number 43 on the US Hot R&B/Hip-Hop Songs chart. It additionally peaked at number 66 on the Canadian Hot 100. With the release of Cruel Summer on September 18, "New God Flow" was extended to feature a verse from Ghostface Killah under the title "New God Flow.1", being a minute longer than the single version. Pusha T revealed he "fainted" when he heard Ghostface Killah's verse on the song during a private album preview on August 28.

== Critical reception ==
"New God Flow" received generally positive reviews from music critics. Eric Arredondo of Beats Per Minute described the song as being the best example of a Cruel Summer track, being compared favorably against "Mercy", "I Don't Like", "Burn", and "Exodus 23:1". He especially considered West's verse to come with "a ferocity and soulfulness" similar to "Jesus Walks" (2004). In comparison to the live performance of it at the 2012 BET Awards, Nathan Reese of Refinery29 viewed the song as what "manages a similarly intense effect, letting Pusha T and Kanye West maintain all the anger and vulnerability they showed at that show". Consequence considered "New God Flow" to be an essential track on Cruel Summer, while Complex listed the song at number 34 on their list of the 50 best songs of 2012. At the XXL Awards in 2013, "New God Flow" won the award for Best Beat.

== Live performances ==
On July 1, 2012, "New God Flow" was first performed at the 2012 BET Awards during an a cappella by West, following the performances of previous singles "Mercy" and "Cold". On July 7, West performed the song alongside Pusha T as the first performance together of the song in Atlantic City. On September 1, the duo performed "New God Flow" during their surprise G.O.O.D. Music set at Jay-Z's Made in America Festival, accompanied by rapper Big Sean. The set also included performances of "I Don't Like" (2012), "Can't Tell Me Nothing" (2007), and "Dance (A$$)" (2011). On October 24, West performed the song at a Samsung Galaxy Note II launch event, which took place at Moynihan Station in New York City.

== Credits and personnel ==
Credits are adapted from the single version credits on Tidal and liner notes of Cruel Summer.

=== Locations ===
- Recorded at Jungle City, New York City
- Mixed at the Mix Spot, Los Angeles

=== Personnel ===
- Kanye West – lead vocals, writing, production
- Dennis Coles – vocals, writing
- Terrence Thornton – vocals, writing
- Ronald Bean – writing (sample)
- Highleigh Crizoe – writing (sample)
- Herb Rooney – writing (sample)
- Reverend G. I. Townsend – writing (sample)
- Marcos Valle – writing (sample)
- Boogz – co-producer
- Mike Dean – keyboards
- Anthony Kilhoffer – additional production, mixing engineer
- Tapez – co-producer
- Daniel Betancourt – recording engineer
- Noah Goldstein – recording engineer
- Kenneth Lewis – recording engineer

=== Samples ===
- Contains a sample from "Synthetic Substitution", written by Herb Rooney and performed by Melvin Bliss
- Contains a sample from "Mighty Healthy (A Cappella)" written and recorded by Dennis Coles (Ghostface Killah), with additional writing from Ronald Bean, Highleigh Crizoe, and Herb Rooney
- Contains a sample from "Sermon Fragment", written and recorded by the Reverend G. I. Townsend
- Contains a sample from "Bôdas de Sangue", written and recorded by Marcos Valle.

== Charts ==
Chart (2012)	Peak position
Canada Hot 100 (Billboard)	66
US Billboard Hot 100	89
US Hot R&B/Hip-Hop Songs (Billboard)	43
