= New York What Is Funky =

Studio album by Ultramagnetic MC's
- Released: April 4, 1996
- Recorded: 1990–1994
- Genre: Hip-hop, rap
- Label: Ol' Skool Flava, Tuff City
- Producer: Ced Gee, Aaron Fuchs

Ultramagnetic MC's chronology
The Basement Tapes 1984-1990 (1995)	New York What Is Funky (1996)	Mo Loves Basement Tapes (1997)

New York What Is Funky is a compilation album by the Ultramagnetic MCs. Ced Gee supplied the tracks to Tuff City. These tracks were recorded from '90-'94 recording sessions. "Chuck Chillout" is a tribute to DJ Chuck Chillout.

Professional ratings
Review scores
Source	Rating
AllMusic	2/5 stars

== Track listing ==
1. "Grip the Mic"
2. "New York What Is Funky"
3. "Black Potions"
4. (untitled)
5. "Here I Go Again"
6. "I'm Fuckin' Flippin'"
7. "Biscuits and Eggs"
8. "Chuck Chillout"
9. "Poo Poo Wreckers"
10. "Catchin' Bodies"
11. "Tim Dog Live on Capitol Radio"
12. "Join the Party"
13. "I Like Your Style"
14. "I Ain't Takin' No Shorts"
