= The Four Horsemen (album) =

Studio album by Ultramagnetic MCs
- Released: August 10, 1993
- Recorded: 1992–1993
- Genre: Hip hop
- Length: 51:28
- Label: Wild Pitch
- Producer: Ultramagnetic MCs; Godfather Don

Ultramagnetic MCs chronology
Funk Your Head Up (1992)	The Four Horsemen (1993)	The Best Kept Secret (2007)

The Four Horsemen is the third studio album by American hip hop group Ultramagnetic MCs. It was released on August 10, 1993, via Wild Pitch Records. Audio production was handled by Ultramagnetic MCs, except for four tracks produced by Godfather Don, who helped to incorporate a darker, jazzier sound than the group's previous work. "Checkin' My Style" and "See the Man on the Street" were originally recorded in 1992 during Godfather Don-produced sessions for a projected solo album for Kool Keith's alias Rhythm X. Those same sessions also produced songs released on Cenobites LP, the CD edition of which contains the original extended version of "Checkin' My Style," retitled "Return To Zero." The Four Horsemen includes recurring science fiction and baseball themes and was viewed by fans as a welcome return to the group's hardcore roots. Because of a manufacturing error, the current Fontana Distribution pressing is identified as the U.M.C.'s on the covering sticker under the shrink wrap. The album peaked at number 55 on the Top R&B/Hip-Hop Albums and number 15 on the Heatseekers Albums.

Professional ratings
Review scores
Source	Rating
AllMusic	2.5/5 stars
Rolling Stone	link
The Source	link
Vibe	(favorable) link

== Track listing ==
No.	Title	Producer(s)	Length
1.	"We are the Horsemen"	Ultramagnetic MCs	3:53
2.	"Checkin' My Style"	Godfather Don	2:31
3.	"Two Brothers with Checks (San Francisco, Harvey)"	Ultramagnetic MCs	4:43
4.	"Raise it Up" (featuring Godfather Don)	Godfather Don	4:18
5.	"Saga of Dandy, the Devil, & Day"	Godfather Don	4:36
6.	"Delta Force II"	Ultramagnetic MCs	3:55
7.	"Adventures of Herman's Lust (Moe Love III)"	Moe Love	2:06
8.	"See the Man on the Street"	Godfather Don	3:23
9.	"Bring it Down to Earth"	Ultramagnetic MCs	3:36
10.	"Don't be Scared"	Ultramagnetic MCs	5:03
11.	"One Two, One Two"	Ultramagnetic MCs	2:44
12.	"Time to Catch a Body"	Ultramagnetic MCs	3:31
13.	"Yo, Black"	Ultramagnetic MCs	4:23
14.	"Big Booty"	Ultramagnetic MCs	2:46
Total length:			51:28

== Personnel ==
- Maurice Russell Smith – main artist, drums, keyboards, scratches, producer
- Cedric Ulmont Miller – main artist, alto-saxophone, engineer, producer
- Trevor Randolph – main artist, piano, percussion, producer
- Keith Matthew Thornton – main artist, bass, producer
- Rodney Chapman – featured artist (track 4), engineer, producer (tracks: 2, 4, 5, 8)
- William "Spaceman" Patterson – guitar, bass, Rhodes piano
- Bruce Purse – horns & saxophone
- Ross Schneider – harmonica
- Charles Lewis – keyboards
- Gary Clugston – engineer
- Lisle Leete – engineer
- Chris Gehringer – mastering
- David Norton – photography
- Terry Clarke – design
- Amy Fine – art direction
