= Smack My Bitch Up (album) =

Studio album by Ultramagnetic MCs
- Released: 1998
- Recorded: 1988–1992
- Genre: Hip hop
- Label: Tuff City Records; TUF CD 0624

Ultramagnetic MCs chronology
Smack My Bitch Up (1998)	The Best Kept Secret (2007)

Professional ratings
Review scores
Source	Rating
AllMusic	2.5/5 stars

Smack My Bitch Up is an album by the Ultramagnetic MCs featuring unreleased songs, aside from "Smack My Bitch Up 1988." It was released on CD and 12" vinyl. Tracks 7 and 8 did not appear on the vinyl release.

== Track listing ==
1. "Intro"
2. "Positive Beams 1992"
3. "Mo Love's Original Poppa Large 1990"
4. "Because You Are So Funny 1990"
5. "TR Love the Superstar"
6. "NBA Allstars 1989"
7. "Nervous 1991"
8. "Talkin' Out Your Ass (Remix) 1990"
9. "Bonus Beats 1991"
10. "Dog This Is for You 1991"
  - Featuring: Jay Cee, Percepter
11. "I Like Your Style (Remix) 1990"
12. "Smack My Bitch Up 1988"
13. "Moe Love Is on the Mix 1989"
