= Synthetic Substitution =

Song by Melvin Bliss
- A-side: "Reward"
- Released: 1973
- Genre: Funk, soul
- Label: Sunburst
- Songwriter: Herb Rooney
- Producer: Herb Rooney

"Synthetic Substitution" is a 1973 song by Melvin Bliss. The song begins with a 2-bar drum break performed by Bernard Purdie. Originally starting life as a throwaway B-side, with "Reward" as the A-Side, the song failed to chart anywhere on its initial release because of the collapse of Opal Productions, the parent company of Sunburst Records. However, after the song was sampled by Ultramagnetic MCs in their track "Ego Trippin", many other artists followed suit, and eventually the song became one of the most sampled songs of all time.

== Background ==
Since the Exciters had disbanded in 1971, Herb Rooney was out of a record deal. Having previously written for other artists, Rooney decided to continue down this path.

Meanwhile, Melvin Bliss had drifted from stage to stage since leaving the Army in 1957. Looking to boost his career prospects he visited a Queens concert hall intending to use it for self-promotion. While awaiting a meeting with the hall's owner, he encountered the mother of Herb Rooney and it emerged that he wanted a singer to record one of his compositions. After an informal discussion with Rooney himself, Bliss hit the studio to record it. Rooney had intended the A-Side to be "Reward" and thus presented it to Bliss first.

== Subject matter ==
"Synthetic Substitution" is a scathing critique of what society would be like if it was entirely computerised, which towards the end of the song features the wailing of Bliss clinging onto the final few authentic remnants of his daily life. In 1986 the song's drums, provided by Bernard Purdie - were sampled in "Ego Trippin'" by Ultramagnetic MCs, spawning numerous other uses. It has since been sampled in over 800 songs.

"Synthetic Substitution" lends its name to a 2011 Earl Holder-produced documentary about Melvin Bliss, Synthetic Substitution: The Life Story of Melvin Bliss, which was released by Peripheral Enterprises. In a 2010 interview produced exclusively for its trailer, Bliss said that "[Herb Rooney and I] had no idea what the song was about; we just needed a B-side".

=== Select list of samples ===
- "Nigga Bridges", "Getdafucout" and "Throw Ya Gunz" by Onyx
- "God Made Me Funky" by Too Poetic
- "24 Deep" and "Back Fade" by Brotha Lynch Hung
- "Come Baby Come" and "Zunga Zeng" by K7
- "Alwayz into Somethin'" and "Real Niggaz Don't Die" by N.W.A
- "Nowhere to Run, Nowhere to Hide" and "Bang Your Head" by Gravediggaz
- "O.P.P." and "Yoke the Joker" by Naughty by Nature
- "Transit Ride" and "Trust Me" by Guru
- "How U Get a Record Deal?", "Looks Like a Job For..." and "Somethin' Funky" by Big Daddy Kane
- "For Pete's Sake", "Anger in the Nation" and "Can't Front on Me" by Pete Rock & CL Smooth
- "Jam 4 U" and "I'm a Bad" by Redman
- "Smile" by Vitamin C
- "Bring Da Ruckus", "Clan in da Front", and "Wu-Tang: 7th Chamber - Part II" by Wu-Tang Clan
- "Die in Your Arms" by Justin Bieber
- "New God Flow" by Pusha T and Kanye West
- "My Life" by 50 Cent
- "Ego Trippin'" and "Watch Me Now" by Ultramagnetic MC's
- "The Champ" and "Mighty Healthy" by Ghostface Killah
- "DWYCK", "Code of the Streets" and "ALONGWAYTOGO" by Gang Starr
- "Land of Lords" by The Underachievers
- "Don't Believe the Hype", "Miuzi Weighs a Ton" and "Brothers Gonna Work It Out" by Public Enemy
- "All I Need" by Method Man
- "Step to My Girl" and "A Name I Call Myself" by Souls of Mischief
- "Middle of the Summer" by Meek Mill
- "Die Like a Rockstar" by Danny Brown
- "Miller Time" by Plastic Little
- "Animal Instinct" by Mobb Deep
- "Chillin" by Audio Two
- "Deadly Venoms (Vocals Up)" by Prince Rakeem
- "Run On" and "Extreme Ways" by Moby
- "So Called Friends" by Group Home
- "Potholes in My Lawn", "Millie Pulled a Pistol on Santa" and "Stone Age" by De La Soul
- Beats International - Won't Talk About It
- "Cuttin' Headz" by Ol' Dirty Bastard
- "Street Dreamin" by Bridget Kelly
- "The 4th Branch" by Immortal Technique
- "Funky Dividends" by Three Times Dope
- "The Streetz R Deathrow", "When I Get Free II", "Part Time Mutha" and "Soulja's Story" by 2Pac
- "Grown Man Sport" by InI
- "Just Be Good to Green" by Professor Green
- "Dope Bitch by The-Dream
- "MMMBop" by Hanson
- "Ya Mama" by The Pharcyde
- "Saturday Night" by Schoolly D
- "She's Playing Hard to Get (Clark Kent's Strictly Hip-Hop Remix)" by Hi-Five
- "Pockets Full" by Skyzoo
- "Love Me Now" by Beenie Man
- "Burnt" by Del tha Funkee Homosapien
- "O.G. Original Gangster" by Ice-T
- "Yasawas" by Amon Tobin
- "Supernova at the End of the Universe" by The Orb
- "Eazy Street" by Eazy-E
- "What U See Is What U Get" by Xzibit
- "I've Been Thinking About You" by Mariah Carey
- "Saturday Nite Live" by Masta Ace Incorporated
- "We Go Where Ever We Want" by French Montana
- "Wild and Crazy" and "A Visit to the Gynecologyst" by Dr. Octagon
- "The Anthem" by Lootpack
- "Supa Jean" by DJ Jazzy Jeff
- "Sun Used to Shine" by DJ Shadow and Cut Chemist
- "Crossroads" by LL Cool J
- "Meanwhile, Rick James..." by Cake
- "Step to My Girl" by Hieroglyphics
- "One in the Chamba" by The Almighty RSO
- "Ice Cube Killa" by Cypress Hill
- "Home of the Greats" by Black Milk
- "All in Together Now" by DJ Muggs and Gza
- "Runway" by Snow
- "On a Clear Day" by P.M. Dawn
- "Cool V's Tribute to Scratching" by Biz Markie
- "Murder by Reason of Insanity" by Scarface
- "Great Pretender" by Choice
- "Cat People" by Cujo
- "Droppin' the Bomb" by The New Style
- "The Movement" by Common
- "Scarface Groove" by Paris
- "Knock The Hustle" by Cozz
- "Amoch Anocht" by Kneecap
