= Reaching for the Best =

Single by The Exciters
- Released: 1975
- Genre: Funk/Soul
- Label: 20th Century Records
- Songwriters: Herb Rooney & Ian Levine
- Producers: Herb Rooney & Ian Levine

Reaching for the Best is a 1975 song by The Exciters, written and produced by Herb Rooney and British producer Ian Levine. The song was aimed at the British Northern Soul scene, but crossed over to the UK Singles Chart where it peaked at No. 31.
