= Bill Cosby Presents the Cosnarati: State of Emergency =

2009 studio album by Bill Cosby

Studio album by Bill Cosby
- Released: October 20, 2009 (digital); November 14, 2009 (CD)
- Recorded: 2008
- Studio: World Alert Music (New York, NY)
- Genre: Hip hop
- Length: 57:55
- Label: World Alert Music
- Producers: Bill Cosby (exec.); Spaceman Patterson; Ced-Gee (co.)

Bill Cosby chronology
The Bill Cosby Collection (2004)	Bill Cosby Presents the Cosnarati: State of Emergency (00000001)	Keep Standing (2010)

Professional ratings
Review scores
Source	Rating
Allmusic	3.5/5 stars

Bill Cosby Presents the Cosnarati: State of Emergency is a studio album by American entertainer Bill Cosby. It was released digitally on October 20, 2009, and in physical form on November 24, 2009 via World Alert Music. Audio production of the project was handled by Cosby's longtime musical colleague William "Spaceman" Patterson and Ultramagnetic MCs' co-founder Cedric "Ced Gee" Miller. It featured guest appearances from rappers Jace the Great, Hahz the Ripper, and Supa Nova Slom.

== Track listing ==
All music is composed by Spaceman Patterson and Ced-Gee.

No.	Title	Writer(s)	Length
1.	"State of Emergency"	W. H. Cosby; W. S. Patterson; C. Miller; H. McMillan; J. Gary	3:54
2.	"Why?"	W. H. Cosby; W. S. Patterson; C. Miller; H. McMillan; J. Gary	3:30
3.	"Runnin'"	W. H. Cosby; W. S. Patterson; C. Miller; H. McMillan; J. Gary	4:24
4.	"Fear No Man"	W. H. Cosby; W. S. Patterson; C. Miller; D. Torain; J. Gary	4:14
5.	"Take Time"	W. H. Cosby; W. S. Patterson; C. Miller; H. McMillan; J. Gary	3:58
6.	"Where Did I Go Wrong?"	W. H. Cosby; W. S. Patterson; C. Miller; H. McMillan; J. Gary	4:39
7.	"But First"	W. H. Cosby; W. S. Patterson; C. Miller; H. McMillan; J. Gary	3:57
8.	"Perfect World"	W. H. Cosby; W. S. Patterson; C. Miller; D. Torain; H. McMillan; J. Gary	3:45
9.	"Dad's Behind the Glass"	W. H. Cosby; W. S. Patterson; C. Miller; H. McMillan; J. Gary	3:50
10.	"The Safe of Your Heart"	W. H. Cosby; W. S. Patterson; C. Miller; D. Torain; H. McMillan; J. Gary	5:21
11.	"Where's the Parade"	W. H. Cosby; W. S. Patterson; D. Torain; J. Gary	4:14
12.	"Get on Your Job"	W. H. Cosby; C. Miller; H. McMillan	3:14
13.	"Look Into the Eyes"	W. H. Cosby; W. S. Patterson; C. Miller; D. Torain; J. Gary	4:16
14.	"I Wish"	W. H. Cosby; W. S. Patterson; C. Miller; J. Gary	4:38
Total length:			57:55

== Personnel ==
- William Henry Cosby Jr. - vocals, concept, percussion, keyboards, executive producer
- William "Spaceman" Patterson - vocals, guitar, bass, drums, drum programming, keyboards, synthesizer, horns, trumpet, sitar, whistle, arranging, mixing, producer
- Cedric Ulmont Miller - vocals, drum programming, keyboards, arranging, mixing, co-producer
- Hassan McMillan - vocals, keyboards, arranging
- Jamal Ali Gary - vocals
- Daoud Torain - vocals
- Jeff Jones - vocals, mixing, recording
- Norman G. Bullard - vocals, additional engineering
- Taharqa Patterson - backing vocals
- Preston Vismala - keyboards
- Stanton Davis - trumpet
- Bob Stewart - tuba
- Tony Dawsey - mastering
- Alonzo Wright - additional engineering
- Erika Ranee - artwork
