= The Best Kept Secret (Ultramagnetic MCs album) =

Studio album by Ultramagnetic MCs
- Released: January 9, 2007
- Recorded: 2006–2007
- Genre: East Coast hip hop; underground hip hop
- Length: 58:01
- Label: DMAFT
- Producer: Carl Caprioglio (exec.); Underwear Pissy; Ced-Gee; Ariel Caban; Moe Love

Ultramagnetic MCs chronology
| The Four Horsemen (1993) | The Best Kept Secret (2007) | Ultra Laboratory Stories (2010) |

Singles from The Best Kept Secret
- 1. "Mechanism Nice (Born Twice) / Nottz" Released: 2006

Professional ratings
Review scores
| Source | Rating |
|---|---|
| AllMusic | 2/5 stars |
| HipHopDX | 2.5/5 stars |
| RapReviews | 4.5/10 stars |

The Best Kept Secret is the fourth studio album by American hip hop group Ultramagnetic MCs. It was released on January 9, 2007, via DMAFT Records. Audio production was handled by Ariel 'Cartel' Caban and Ultramagnetic MCs' members DJ Moe Love, Ced Gee, and Kool Keith under his moniker Underwear Pissy. The album cover features the original line-up, but T.R. Love, as well as longtime associate Tim Dog, do not appear on the record. The album featured guest appearances from Gee-Banga and Goody-2.

The album was preceded by a 2006 single "Mechanism Nice (Born Twice) / Nottz", but neither the single, nor the album hit any major chart and, to date, The Best Kept Secret is the group's most recent effort.

== Track listing ==
| No. | Title | Producer(s) | Length |
|---|---|---|---|
| 1. | "The Plaques" | Ariel Caban | 3:25 |
| 2. | "Late Night Rumble" | Underwear Pissy | 2:04 |
| 3. | "Mechanism Nice (Born Twice)" | Moe Luv | 3:44 |
| 4. | "Ain't It Good 2 U" | Ced-Gee | 2:56 |
| 5. | "Super Spellbound" | Ariel Caban | 3:42 |
| 6. | "Pop Bottles" | Underwear Pissy | 3:26 |
| 7. | "Nottz" (featuring Goody-2) | Underwear Pissy | 4:07 |
| 8. | "Porno Star (Part 2)" | Ced-Gee | 4:37 |
| 9. | "Underwear Pissy" | Underwear Pissy | 3:15 |
| 10. | "Party Started" | Ced-Gee | 3:49 |
| 11. | "War" (featuring Gee-Banga) | Underwear Pissy | 4:06 |
| 12. | "Delta 2006" | Ced-Gee | 4:07 |
| 13. | "Silk Master" | Ariel Caban | 3:22 |
| 14. | "Vibrato" | Moe Luv | 2:53 |
| Total length: | | | 58:01 |

Sample credits

- "Delta 2006" contains elements from "Blues and Pants" by James Brown (1971)

== Personnel ==
- Keith Matthew Thornton – main artist, producer (tracks: 2, 6, 7, 9, 11)
- Cedric Ulmont Miller – main artist, producer (tracks: 4, 8, 10, 12)
- Maurice Russell Smith – main artist, producer (tracks: 3, 14)
- Ariel Caban – producer (tracks: 1, 5, 13)
- Mark Copeland – project manager
- Carl Caprioglio – executive producer
- Kurt Lindsay – engineer
- Hernon Santiago – mixing
- Mark Likosky – photography
