= Turn to You (Mother's Day Dedication) =

Promotional single by Justin Bieber
- Released: May 11, 2012
- Genre: Pop
- Length: 3:39
- Label: Island, RBMG, Schoolboy
- Songwriters: Justin Bieber, Nasri, Jacob Pena, Adam Messinger, Tom Strahle
- Producers: Justin Bieber, Adam Messinger

Justin Bieber promotional singles chronology
"Never Let You Go" (2010)	"Turn to You (Mother's Day Dedication)" (2012)	"Die in Your Arms" (2012)

Music video
- "Never Let You Go" on YouTube

"Turn to You (Mother's Day Dedication)" is a song by Canadian singer Justin Bieber. It was released on May 11, 2012, two days before Mother's Day.

== Background ==
The song was written and composed by Bieber, Nasri, Jacob Pena, Adam Messinger, and Tom Strahle. It was produced by Bieber alongside Adam Messinger for his third album, Believe, but was ultimately not included and instead released as a standalone single.

== Chart performance ==
Chart (2012)	Peak position
Australia (ARIA)	25
Austria (Ö3 Austria Top 40)	49
Canada (Canadian Hot 100)	22
Denmark (Tracklisten)	12
France (SNEP)	79
Ireland (IRMA)	27
Italy (Musica e Dischi)	40
Netherlands (Single Top 100)	24
New Zealand (Recorded Music NZ)	18
Norway (VG-lista)	11
Scotland (OCC)	39
South Korea (Gaon Chart)	168
South Korea (Gaon International Chart)	11
Sweden (Sweden Digital Songs)	1
Switzerland (Schweizer Hitparade)	35
UK Singles (OCC)	39
US Billboard Hot 100	60

== Release history ==
Region	Date	Format	Label
United Kingdom	11 May 2012	Digital download	The Island Def Jam Music Group
