= Exodus 23:1 =

2012 single by Pusha T

Single by Pusha T featuring The-Dream
- Released: May 24, 2012
- Genre: Hip hop
- Length: 4:09
- Label: GOOD; Def Jam
- Songwriters: Terrence Thornton; Terius Gesteelde-Diamant
- Producer: Rico Beats

Pusha T singles chronology
"Mercy" (2012)	"Exodus 23:1" (2012)	"New God Flow" (2012)

The-Dream singles chronology
"No Church in the Wild" (2012)	"Exodus 23:1" (2012)	"Dope Bitch" (2012)

Music video
- "Exodus 23:1" on YouTube

"Exodus 23:1" is a song by American rapper Pusha T, released on May 24, 2012. It features vocals from American singer The-Dream and was produced by Rico Beats. The song is believed to be a diss track aimed at Young Money Entertainment, particularly rappers Drake and Lil Wayne.

== Background ==
In an interview with MTV, Rico Beats stated Pusha T told him to use "something dark" for the production of the song. Rico took inspiration from the song "What's Beef" by The Notorious B.I.G., which he sampled and developed his sound from for "Exodus 23:1". In addition, Rico claimed to have no knowledge of if Pusha intended to diss someone with the song, saying:

Honestly, when we were in the room listening to that record, I didn't hear none of these guys' names brought up. It was none of that. Dream got in his zone and he went in the booth. Pusha got his pen, like I didn't hear nobody mentioned.

The title of the song references a Bible passage that reads: "Thou shalt not raise a false report: put not thine hand with the wicked to be an unrighteous witness."

== Content ==
"Exodus 23:1" heavily references Biggie's "What's Beef". Although Pusha T does not refer by name in the song and has denied it is a diss, multiple lines have been regarded as directed toward Drake and Lil Wayne. He seemingly addresses to Drake that his label, Young Money Entertainment, has no loyalty to him, in lyrics such as "Beef is when you hide behind them other niggas / But they ain't killers, they ain't pullin' them triggers, fuck niggas" and "Them niggas using you as a pawn / You see they never loaded they guns / Now you out here by yourself / Ask Steve Jobs, wealth don't buy health". Pusha appears to accuse Drake of lying in his music, and references his recording contract to Wayne as well as Wayne's contracts: "You signed to one nigga that signed to another nigga that's signed to three niggas / Now that's bad luck". In addition, he allegedly takes shots at producer Young Chop, who had a brief feud with Pusha's associate Kanye West for remaking his beat on the remix of "I Don't Like" by Chief Keef: "You can keep your beats, nigga / We'd much rather share your bitch, nigga, bitch nigga".

== Responses ==
Shortly after the song was released, Lil Wayne responded on Twitter with a post reading, "Fuk pusha t and anybody that love em". Young Chop also reacted to the song with critical comments on Twitter and re-tweeted Wayne's post. Rapper Kid Cudi showed support for Pusha T (who was his labelmate at the time), tweeting "I LOVE MY NIGGA PUSHA T, FUCK ANYBODY WHO FEEL DIFFERENT. WE AINT HO'S OUT HERE".

== Music video ==
The music video was directed by Samuel Rogers and released on May 29, 2012. It was filmed in Pusha T's hometown of Norfolk, Virginia, in the Berkley section on Walker Avenue. The video depicts a realistic look of drug use and drug dealing. Pusha T is seen on a street corner surrounded by his crew, riding atop the handlebars of a bicycle, and in a kitchen while a person nearby sniffs cocaine from a dollar bill.
