= Brenda Reid =

American singer (1945–2026)

Brenda L. Reid (July 20, 1945 – April 29, 2026) was an American singer, who was lead singer of the group The Exciters best known for (U.S. #4) single "Tell Him". She was the partner of fellow group member Herb Rooney.

== Life and career ==
Brenda L. Reid was born on July 20, 1945. In 1961, Reid joined The Masterettes, consisting of Brenda Reid on lead, Sylvia Wilbur (who later married Dickie Williams), Lillian Walker, and Carol Johnson. That group became The Exciters. The Exciters' first hit record was "Tell Him" (U.S. #4), a song written by Bert Berns and produced by Jerry Leiber and Mike Stoller. "Tell Him" was recorded in late 1962 and a Scopitone music video was produced the following year. Other hit songs with Reid's vocals included "He's Got the Power", "Get Him" and Northern Soul classic "Blowing Up My Mind". The Exciters also recorded the original version of "Do Wah Diddy Diddy" in 1963; it was covered shortly after by Manfred Mann, for whom it was an international hit.

In 1975, Reid and the Exciters enjoyed a hit single with "Reachin' for the Best", produced by Rooney and young newcomer producer Ian Levine. The song was aimed at the British Northern soul scene but crossed over to the UK Singles Chart where it peaked at No. 31.

In 1978, Reid and Herb Rooney began recording as a duo. Brenda and Herb had a final R&B chart hit with "Tonight I'm Gonna Make You A Star" and released one album in 1979, In Heat Again.

Reid died on April 29, 2026, at the age of 80. Her son, Cory Rooney, is a songwriter and producer, known for creating hits for many famous artists.

== See also ==
- List of doo-wop musicians
