= The Exciters =

American pop music group (1961–1974)

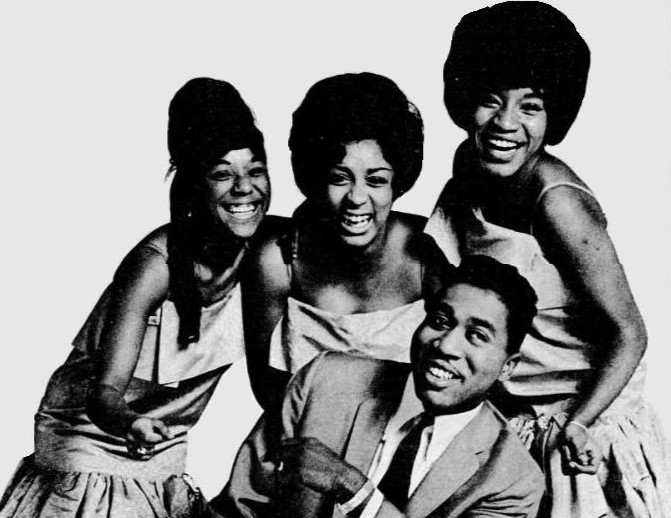
- The Exciters in 1964

Background information
- Also known as: The Masterettes
- Origin: Queens, New York, United States
- Genres: R&B, pop
- Instrument: Vocals
- Years active: 1961–1974 (as group)
- Labels: United Artists, Roulette, Bang, Shout, RCA, 20th Century
- Past members: Brenda Reid; Carolyn Johnson; Lillian Walker; Sylvia Wilbur; Penny Carter; Herb Rooney; Ronnie Pace; Skip McPhee

The Exciters were an American pop music group of the 1960s. They were originally a girl group, with one male member being added afterwards. At the height of their popularity the group consisted of lead singer Brenda Reid, Herb Rooney, Carolyn Johnson and Lillian Walker.

== Career ==
Brenda Reid, Carolyn (Carol) Johnson, Lillian Walker, and Sylvia Wilbur formed the group while at high school together in Queens, New York, in 1961. They were originally called the Masterettes, as a sister group to another group called the Masters, and released their first recording, "Follow the Leader", in early 1962. Wilbur then left the group to be replaced by Penny Carter, and they auditioned for Jerry Leiber and Mike Stoller, winning a recording contract. Penny Carter then left, and was replaced by Herb Rooney, a member of the Masters; Reid and Rooney later married.

The group's name was changed to the Exciters, and their first hit record, arranged by Teacho Wiltshire and produced by Leiber and Stoller for United Artists Records, was "Tell Him", which reached no. 4 on the U.S. pop chart in early 1963, and no. 12 in Canada. The song had previously been released unsuccessfully, as "Tell Her", by Gil Hamilton later known as Johnny Thunder. According to Jason Ankeny at AllMusic, the Exciters' version of "Tell Him" "...boasted an intensity that signified a sea change in the presentation and perception of femininity in popular music, paving the way for such tough, sexy acts as the Shangri-Las and the Ronettes."

Dusty Springfield was on a stop-over in New York City en route to Nashville to make a country music album with the Springfields in 1962, when she heard the Exciters' "Tell Him" playing while taking a late-night walk by the Colony Record Store on Broadway. The song helped Springfield decide to embark on a solo career with a pop/soul direction. She'd recall: "The Exciters sort of got you by the throat...out of the blue comes blasting at you "I know something about love", and that's it. That's what I wanna do."

Other songs by the group included "He's Got the Power" (written by Ellie Greenwich and Tony Powers), "Get Him", and Northern soul classic "Blowing Up My Mind". The Exciters also recorded "Do-Wah-Diddy", written by Greenwich and Jeff Barry, in 1963; with a revised title of "Do Wah Diddy Diddy" it was covered shortly after by Manfred Mann, for whom it was an international hit. They were one of the opening acts for the Beatles during their first North American tour in August–September 1964. During this tour, they became the first black musicians to perform at the Gator Bowl in Jacksonville, Florida; the stadium's management had initially refused to allow the Exciters to perform because of their race, but when the Beatles said they would refuse to perform too, the group was allowed to go on.

In 1965, the Exciters left the Leiber-Stoller management team, and the United Artists label, for Roulette Records. There they issued a remake (with revised lyrics) of the Frankie Lymon & the Teenagers' song "I Want You to Be My Boy". They continued to record through the 1960s for Bert Berns' labels Bang and Shout, and later for RCA, but with little success. Ronnie Pace and Skip McPhee replaced Johnson and Walker. The group broke up in 1974.

In 1975, Brenda and Herb Rooney, credited as the Exciters, enjoyed a hit single in the UK with "Reaching for the Best", produced by Rooney and young newcomer producer Ian Levine. The song was aimed at the British Northern soul scene but crossed over to the UK Singles Chart where it peaked at No. 31. As Brenda & Herb, Reid and Rooney had a final R&B chart hit in 1978 with "Tonight I'm Gonna Make You A Star". The pair later separated, and Reid later launched a new version of the Exciters with members of her family. Brenda Reid and Lillian Walker occasionally performed together as The Exciters.

Herb Rooney died on February 16, 1991. Brenda and Herb Rooney's son, Mark Cory Rooney, is a music business executive. Carolyn "Carol" Johnson died on May 7, 2007, at the age of 62. Lillian Walker-Moss died on February 5, 2023, at the age of 78. She had been battling angiosarcoma, a rare form of cancer. With the death of Brenda Reid on April 29, 2026, at the age of 80, all original members of the group have died.

== Discography ==
=== Chart singles ===
Year	Single	Chart Positions			
Year	Single	US Pop	US R&B	AUS	UK
1962	"Tell Him"	4	5	6	46
1963	"He's Got the Power"	57	—N/a	9	—N/a
1963	"Get Him"	76	—N/a	53	—N/a
1964	"Do-Wah-Diddy"	78	n/a	—N/a	—N/a
1965	"I Want You to Be My Boy"	98	n/a	—N/a	—N/a
1966	"A Little Bit of Soap"	58	—N/a	67	—N/a
1969	"You Don't Know What You're Missing ('Til It's Gone)"	—N/a	49	—N/a	—N/a
1975	"Reaching for the Best"	—N/a	—N/a	—N/a	31
1978	"Tonight I'm Gonna Make You a Star"; Brenda & Herb (The Exciters)	—N/a	70	—N/a	—N/a

=== Albums ===
- Tell Him (United Artists, 1963)
- The Exciters (Roulette, 1965)
- Caviar and Chitlins (1969)
- Black Beauty (1971)
- Heaven Is Where You Are (1976)
- The Exciters (1977)

== See also ==
- List of 1960s one-hit wonders in the United States
- United Artists Records
- List of doo-wop musicians
