= Ultramagnetic MCs =

American hip hop group

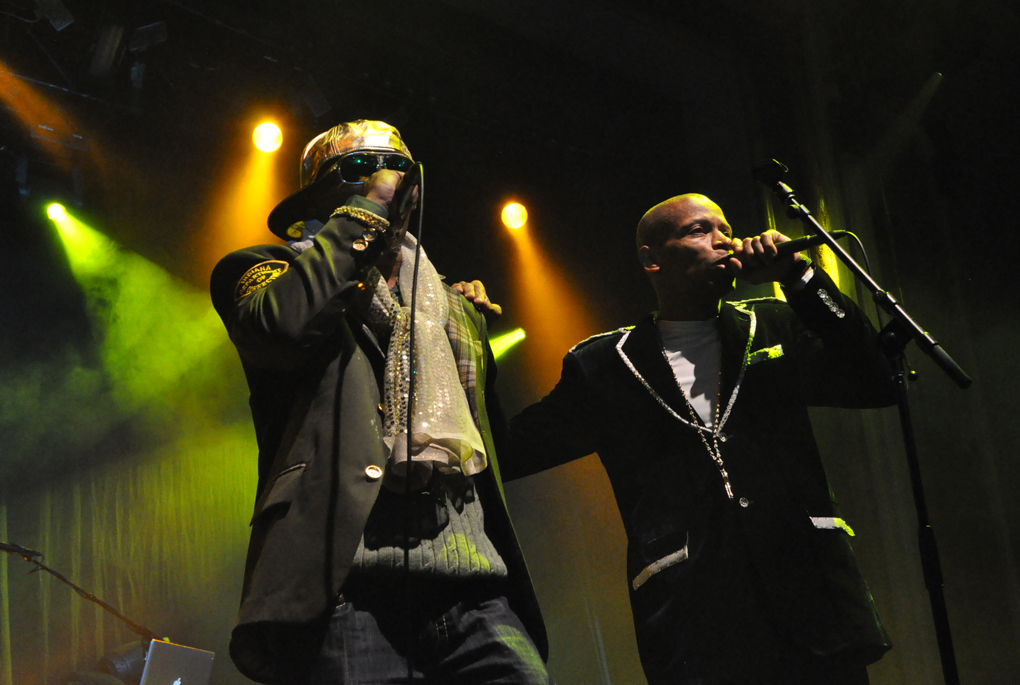
- Ultramagnetic MCs (Kool Keith and Ced-Gee pictured) performing at I'll Be Your Mirror in Asbury Park, New Jersey, September 2011

Background information
- Origin: The Bronx, New York City, U.S.
- Genre: Hip-hop
- Years active: 1984–2001; 2006–present
- Labels: Diamond International (1984–1986); Next Plateau (1986–1991); Mercury/PolyGram Records (1991–1992); Wild Pitch/EMI Records (1993–1994); Tuff City (1994–?); Oxygen Music Works (2001-?); DMAFT (2006–?); Black Pegasus (2010-?); Red Apples 45 (2012-?); Ruffnation Entertainment (2023–?); Anti-Corp (2023-present)
- Members: Kool Keith; Ced-Gee; TR Love; Moe Love; Jaycee; Big.D

Ultramagnetic MCs (rendered as Ultramagnetic MC's) are an American hip-hop group based in the Bronx, New York City. Founded by Kool Keith, the group also includes Ced Gee, TR Love, and Moe Love. Big D was brought into the group by his cousin Kool Keith as a hype man in 1988. Tim Dog became an unofficial member in 1989. In 1990, DJ Jaycee was added as a road manager and backup DJ. A former member, Rooney Roon, was fired following an assault arrest. Beat-boxer Rahzel was a roadie for the group early in its career. The group's work was associated with unorthodox sampling, polysyllabic rhymes, and bizarre lyrical imagery.

== History ==
The Ultramagnetic MCs formed in 1984. Their first single was "To Give You Love" (1985) on the Diamond International label. The group released "Ego Trippin'", their first 12-inch single, on Next Plateau Records in 1986. It was the first hip-hop song to feature the "Synthetic Substitution" drum break sample, composed by Melvin Bliss and one of the most sampled songs of all time. The group's next single was "Travelling at the Speed of Thought (Original)"/"M.C.'s Ultra (Part Two)" followed by "Funky"/"Mentally Mad", one of their most sought-after 12-inch singles. "Travelling" used extensive sampling from "Louie Louie" by the Kingsmen while "Funky" was based on a Joe Cocker piano sample later used as the basis for 2Pac's "California Love". The single was released in 1987, and led to the release of the group's first album.

The Ultramagnetic MCs released a new school classic in 1988, Critical Beatdown, introducing many new sampling techniques. Many believe that without the group's primary producer, Ced Gee, the golden era of sampling may have looked very different. Ced, while uncredited, also produced the majority of Boogie Down Productions' seminal Criminal Minded. These albums are among the first to use "chopped" samples, rearranged and edited to change context. Both albums also feature many James Brown samples, which became prominent in hip-hop in ensuing years. KRS-One has been quoted as saying that he was close to joining Ultramagnetic MCs early on. Paul C. was also a major contributor to Critical Beatdown, producing "Give The Drummer Some", and engineering most of the album. Paul C. also produced the Hip-House mix of "Traveling At The Speed Of Thought", which was used as the group's first music video, and was their sole release in 1989. The single's b-side, "A Chorus Line", became one of Ultramagnetic's most popular songs and introduced new group affiliate Tim Dog. A variation of the "A Chorus Line" instrumental was used as the basis of Tim Dog's debut single, the Ced Gee-produced "Fuck Compton", which became a modest hit and is credited with helping to spark the East coast/West coast feud of the mid 1990s.

The group went on a hiatus for several years, breaking up temporarily in 1990. They returned on Mercury Records in 1992, with the album Funk Your Head Up. The album received a muted response, in part because many tracks had been given a commercial sheen, having been remixed by outside producers at the label's insistence. Alternate mixes of this album's songs along with unreleased tracks from the sessions have appeared on later compilations. The song "Poppa Large", remixed by Da Beatminerz, became a hit and remains a staple of Kool Keith's live show. The song's video featured Keith in a straitjacket, his bald head encased in a birdcage.

In 1993, the group released the album The Four Horsemen, which featured guest production and vocals by Godfather Don, who produced solo Kool Keith sessions in 1992. Some of those tracks appear on The Four Horsemen, and also on Cenobites. The former was the last official album the Ultramagnetic MC's released until their 2007 reunion.

There were many semi-legitimate and compilation albums to follow, the most official of which was Next Plateau's The B-Sides Companion, which featured a new song, some unreleased 1989 songs recorded for a second Next Plateau LP and most of the group's classic singles, albeit in newly remixed form. Ced Gee and Moe Love both provided demos and unreleased songs spanning the group's entire career to Tuff City for a series of four albums which were released without Kool Keith's consent. A live album, Brooklyn To Brixton, was announced but abandoned.

As a reaction to Ced and Moe's involvement in the Tuff City releases, Kool Keith and Tim Dog reunited on the album Big Time, released under the group name Ultra in 1996. Kool Keith went on to record many solo CDs, including several under aliases such as Dr. Octagon and Dr. Dooom. His abstract rhymes and syncopated, off-beat delivery influenced many rappers, including Pharoahe Monch from Organized Konfusion and Ghostface Killah of Wu-Tang Clan.

In 2001, Ultramagnetic MCs released a single, "Make It Rain" / "Mix It Down". Two other songs, "Baby, I'm Mad" and "Who Am I?" were recorded at the same sessions, but remain officially unreleased. In 2004, the original versions of the Next Plateau singles were finally released on CD as bonus tracks on the remastered Critical Beatdown. In a 9 December 2005 interview on Houston's Late Nite Snax radio show, Kool Keith confirmed rumours that the Ultramagnetic MC's had reformed and recorded a new album. Founding Ultramagnetic MC's member Ced Gee has set up Factshen Records. A new Ultramagnetic MC's LP, Back to the Future—The Bronx Kings Are Back, was scheduled to be released in 2006 but was later named The Best Kept Secret and released in January 2007. Although the album's cover features the original line-up of Kool Keith, Ced Gee, Moe Love and TR Love, TR (along with Tim Dog) were absent.Big.D is pictured on the inside of the album cover for best kept secret album cover guest verses are provided by newcomers like Grafiq Malachi Sebek Big.D was taking off 5 songs on the album. However, Tim Dog and TR Love have each recently released songs featuring Ultramagnetic under their own names. Big.D has released a double album with Easy Mo Bee which KoolKeith produced 3 songs and rapped on 3 songs off the double album The group also released a new song after the album's release called "We About Chix", the video can be seen on YouTube.

The group performed live at the ATP I'll Be Your Mirror festival curated by ATP & Portishead in September 2011 in Asbury Park, New Jersey.

== Discography ==
=== Studio albums ===
List of albums, with selected chart positions
Title	Album details	Peak chart positions			
Title	Album details	US R&B /HH	US Heat.	UK R&B /HH	UK Ind.
Critical Beatdown	Released: October 4, 1988; Label: Next Plateau; Formats: CD, LP, Cassette, digital download	57	—	17	— (Note: "The Big Payback" did not enter the UK Singles Chart, but peaked at number 76 on the UK Physical Singles Chart.)
Funk Your Head Up	Released: March 17, 1992; Label: Mercury/PolyGram; Formats: CD, LP, Cassette, digital download	—	—	—	—
The Four Horsemen	Released: August 10, 1993; Label: Wild Pitch/ERG; Formats: CD, LP, Cassette, digital download	55	15	—	—
The Best Kept Secret	Released: January 9, 2007; Label: DMAFT; Formats: CD, LP, digital download	—	—	—	—
Ultra Laboratory Stories (Note: Published as "Ultramagnetic Foundation".)	Released: August 24, 2010; Label: Black Pegasus; Formats: CD, LP	—	—	—	—
Ced Gee X Kool Keith	Released: April 1, 2022; Label: Ruffnation; Formats: LP	—	—	—	—
"—" denotes releases that did not chart or were not released in that country.

=== Collaborations ===
- 2019 – The Foundation

=== Compilation albums ===
List of compilation albums
Title	Album details
The Basement Tapes 1984–1990	Released: 1994; Label: Tuff City; Formats: CD, LP, Cassette
New York What Is Funky	Released: April 4, 1996; Label: Ol' Skool Flava/Tuff City; Formats: CD, LP, digital download
Mo Love's Basement Tapes	Released: 1996; Label: Ol' Skool Flava; Formats: CD, LP, digital download
The B-Sides Companion	Released: October 7, 1997; Label: Next Plateau; Formats: CD, LP, Cassette
Smack My Bitch Up	Released: 1998; Label: Tuff City; Formats: CD, LP, digital download

=== Singles ===
==== As lead artist ====
List of singles, with selected chart positions
Title	Year	Peak chart positions	Album
Title	Year	UK	Album
"To Give You Love"	1986	—	Non-album single
"Ego Trippin'"	1986	—	Critical Beatdown
"Travelling at the Speed of Thought"	1987	—	Critical Beatdown
"Funky"	1987	—	Critical Beatdown
"Watch Me Now"	1988	—	Critical Beatdown
"Ease Back"	1988	—	Critical Beatdown
"Give the Drummer Some"	1989	95	Critical Beatdown
"Make it Happen"	1991	—	Funk Your Head Up
"Poppa Large"	1992	—	Funk Your Head Up
"Two Brothers with Checks (San Francisco, Harvey)"	1992	—	The Four Horsemen
"Raise it Up" (featuring Godfather Don)	1993	—	The Four Horsemen
"I'm Fuckin Flippin" (featuring Kool Keith)	1994	—	New York What Is Funky
"Watch Your Back"	1996	—	Mo Love's Basement Tapes
"—" denotes releases that did not chart or were not released in that country.
