= Dope Bitch =

Single by The-Dream featuring Pusha T

from the album Climax
- Released: July 24, 2012
- Genre: R&B, hip hop
- Length: 4:35
- Label: Radio Killa, Def Jam
- Songwriters: Terius Nash, Terrence Thornton
- Producer: The-Dream

The-Dream singles chronology
"Exodus 23:1" (2012)	"Dope Bitch" (2012)	"M.F.T.R" (2015)

Pusha T singles chronology
"New God Flow" (2012)	"Dope Bitch" (2012)	"Millions" (2013)

"Dope Bitch" (clean version titled "Dope Chick") is a song by American singer-songwriter and record producer The-Dream, featuring American rapper Pusha T. The song was released as a single for digital download in the United States on July 24, 2012. The song is included on The-Dream's EP Climax, which was ultimately a bonus CD on his fourth studio album IV Play (2013).

== Music video ==
The music video for "Dope Bitch" was released on July 17, 2012.

== Charts ==
Chart (2012)	Peak position
US Bubbling Under Hot 100 (Billboard)	25
US Hot R&B/Hip-Hop Songs (Billboard)	33

== Release history ==
Country	Date	Format	Label
United States	July 24, 2012	Digital download	The Island Def Jam Music Group
United States	August 21, 2012	Rhythmic radio	The Island Def Jam Music Group
