= The Anthology of Rap =

2010 rap music anthology

- First edition
- Editor: Adam Bradley, Andrew DuBois
- Genre: Music Criticism
- Publisher: Yale University Press
- Publication date: 2010
- Pages: 867
- ISBN: 9780300141917

The Anthology of Rap is a 2010 rap music anthology published by Yale University Press, with Adam Bradley and Andrew DuBois as the editors. Henry Louis Gates, Jr. wrote the foreword, while Chuck D and Common wrote the afterwords. Bradley and DuBois are English professors, at the associate level at the University of Colorado and University of Toronto Scarborough, respectively. It was published on November 9, 2010.

The book is about 800 pages long. It includes rap lyrics, sorted by chronology and era from 1978 until the book's publication. It also discusses the history and cultural influence of the genre.

Sam Anderson of New York Magazine described the book as "an English major’s hip-hop bible, an impossible fusion of street cred and book learning." Andrew Pettie of The Daily Telegraph characterized the book's idea, under "grave, academic intentions", as: "rap lyrics should be treated by academics with the same chin-stroking seriousness they traditionally reserve for poetry."

== Contents ==
The book has no footnotes.

== Reception ==
The book received considerable critical attention, attracting both praise and criticism.

Writing in the New York Times, Alan Light observed that “this landmark work chronicles an earth-shattering movement with deep roots.”

Dan Chiasson stated in The New York Review of Books that “the Anthology of Rap is among the best books of its kind ever published.”

Paul Devlin of Slate stated that the book "is a good start, but it will inspire mixed emotions." According to Devlin, Gates's "eye-opening" foreword "provides deep historical context for rap" and that "it alone makes the book worth owning." Devlin criticized the title, arguing that the omission of the publisher in it "seems to present a claim to definitiveness" that is not warranted. He added that a footnote section would help readers understand elements such as "echoes, cross-references, in-jokes, esoterica".

Pettie stated that the transcription of rap lyrics does not make for an effective presentation as the rhythm of the music is not represented. He also argued against the book's notion that rap lyrics function as poetry since "if placed alongside the English literary canon, rap lyrics aren’t especially complex or challenging." According to Pettie the introduction "is as dry as a Ryvita cracker". He concluded that "by trying to elevate rap to the status of poetry, this anthology only succeeds in spotlighting its limitations."

Anderson stated that he was "evangelically excited" for the book since "It feels like it was published, exclusively for me, by the vanity press of my own subconscious. "

=== Transcription errors ===
Some reviewers and bloggers called attention to alleged transcription errors. Devlin noted some errors in transcription in his first article in Slate. A blogger named Jay Smooth read the Devlin article, read the book, and found additional transcription mistakes. People commenting in the articles stated that the errors appeared similar to those on the website Online Hip Hop Lyrics Archive (OHHLA).

The authors had asked undergraduates for help transcribing the lyrics; the songs were released around ten years prior to the births of the students. The same students relied on websites for the lyrics, even though websites may have inaccuracies. Even though the editors had contacted the musicians for verification of the lyrics and established a system for verifying the lyrics, many rap songs are not bundled with official printed lyrics. Ultimately, Bradley admitted that the book had transcription errors.

Josh Rothman of the Boston Globe argued that it was understandable that errors in rap transcriptions occur as such things frequently occur in that field. Devlin also acknowledged the difficulty, but he did have strong criticism for the usage of the OHHLA lyrics. Smooth argued that the editors could have taken more effort to avoid the errors.

For instance, on the Ol’ Dirty Bastard song “Brooklyn Zoo,” The Anthology of Rap transcribes a line as “I drop science like girls be droppin babies,” whereas some critics heard “I drop science like Cosby droppin babies.”

=== Awards ===
New York Magazine selected The Anthology of Rap as one of the best books of 2010, with Anderson noting, "This thrilling (but controversial) textual monument to a thrilling (but controversial) oral tradition wrestles the genre's greatest lyricists out of the airwaves and into cold print. . . . [It] enables something wonderful: the ability to sit in perfect silence and roll around in, for example, the lush Keatsian soundplay of Jay-Z.” The Village Voice, The New England Book Festival, the San Francisco Book Festival, and the Book of the Year Awards all honored The Anthology of Rap as one of the best books of 2010.
