= Spaceman Patterson =

American guitarist and producer (born 1954)

- Also known as: William "Billy" Patterson
- Born: August 18, 1954 (age 72); New Brunswick, New Jersey, U.S.
- Origin: New York City, U.S.
- Genres: Jazz; rock; hip hop
- Instrument: Guitar
- Years active: 1976–present
- Website: www.spacemanpatterson.space

William "Spaceman" Patterson (born August 18, 1954) is a guitarist and producer, who has collaborated with Miles Davis, James Brown and Frank Ocean.

== History ==
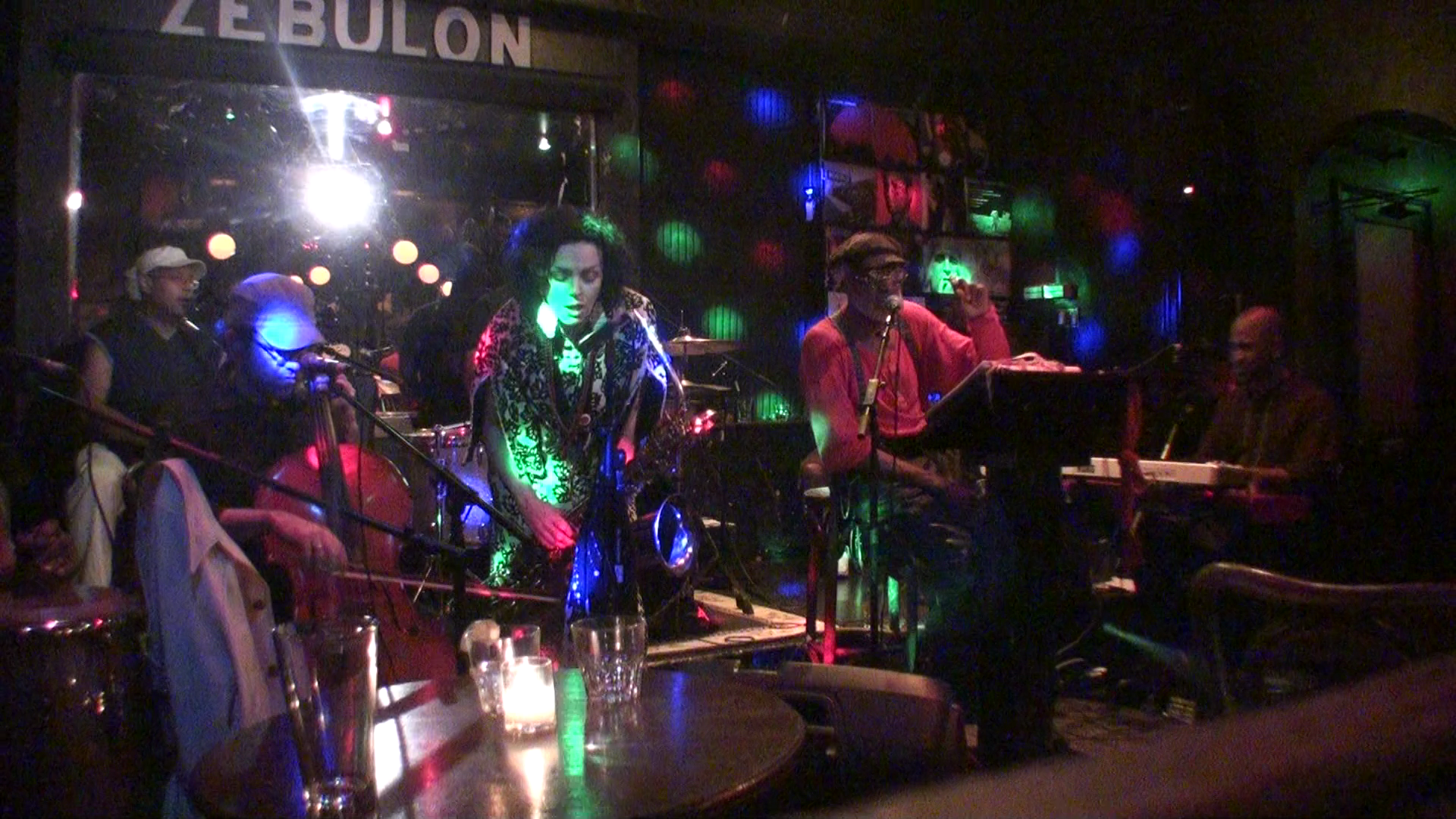
Spaceman Patterson played guitar in the live band of Melvin Van Peebles

Patterson graduated in 1972 from New Brunswick High School and was indicted among the school's distinguished alumni in 2012.

Spaceman Patterson was one of the musicians in Miles Davis' touring line-up in the 1980s. In 1992, Patterson provided music for Ntozake Shange's The Love Space Demands, an adaptation of some of her poetry. In 1995, Patterson produced Melvin Van Peebles' 1995 album Ghetto Gothic. In 2003, he was musical director for the play Dream on Monkey Mountain presented at the Harlem School of the Arts.

In 2008, Patterson was enlisted to produce a hip hop album for Bill Cosby. Known at that time for his comedic work and not for performing hip hop, Cosby's album came as a surprise to some. Patterson told the Associated Press that when Cosby contacted him about making the album, "people started speculating, is he going to rap about Jell-O Pudding Pops or what?" The resulting release, titled The Cosnarati: State Of Emergency, came out on November 14, 2009, on World Alert Music.

In 2016, Spaceman Patterson played guitar on multiple Frank Ocean recordings, including the albums Endless and Blonde. As of 2018, at least 20 hours of outtakes from Patterson's Frank Ocean sessions have not been released.

== Discography ==
Per each album's liner notes.

=== Studio albums ===
==== With Jamaica Boys ====
- 1987: Jamaica Boys (Warner Bros)
- 1989: J Boys (Warner Bros)
- 1990: Shake It Up (Warner Bros)

==== With J-Funk Express ====
- 1993: Getting Back To My Roots (Pioneer)
- 1995: This is Rare Groove (99 Records)

=== As producer ===
- 1983: Trademark – Uh-huh! (Move'n Groove Records)
- 1995: Melvin Van Peebles – Ghetto Gothic (Capitol Records)
- 1996: Monifah – Moods... Moments (Universal)
- 2009: Bill Cosby – The Cosnarati State of Emergency (World Alert Music)

=== As sideman ===
==== With James Blood Ulmer ====
- 1980: Are You Glad to Be in America? (Rough Trade)
- 1993: Blues Preacher (Columbia)

==== With Miles Davis ====
- 1989: Amandla (Warner Bros)
- 2001: 1986-1991: The Warner Years (Warner Bros)

==== With David Sanborn ====
- 1992: Upfront (Elektra)
- 1994: Hearsay (Elektra)

==== With Frank Ocean ====
- 2016: Endless (Def Jam)
- 2016: Blonde (Boys Don't Cry)

With others

- 1976: Hamiet Bluiett - Wildflowers: The New York Loft Jazz Sessions
- 1989: Sly and Robbie – Silent Assassin (Island Records)
- 1990: Toshinobu Kubota – Bonga Wanga (CBS)
- 1993: Teddy Pendergrass – A Little More Magic (Elektra)
- 1997: Ultramagnetic MCs – The B-Sides Companion (Next Plateau)
- 2010: Jaheim – Another Round (Atlantic)
