= Herb Rooney =

American record producer (c. 1940–1990s)

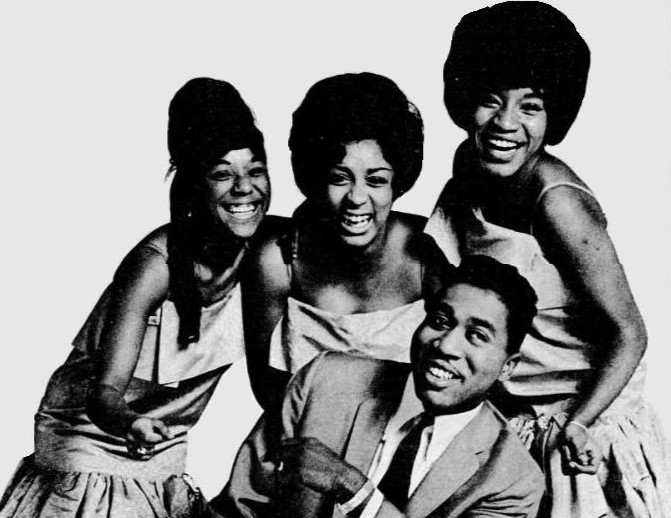
- Rooney (front) as part of the Exciters in 1964

Background information
- Also known as: Herb Rooney
- Born: Herbert Louis Rooney; 1940
- Origin: New York City, U.S.
- Died: February 16, 1991 (aged 50–51)
- Occupations: Record producer, songwriter, bass singer
- Formerly of: The Exciters
- Spouse: Brenda Reid

Herbert Louis Rooney (1940 – February 16, 1991) was an American record producer who was responsible for writing, producing and singing bass on songs by the Exciters and for writing and producing the sample staple "Synthetic Substitution" by Melvin Bliss.

Between 1964 and the mid-1980s, Herb Rooney was married to the Exciters' lead singer Brenda Reid. They had one son, Cory Rooney, who played keyboard for Herb and Brenda when touring and who went on to write music and produce for Mariah Carey, Mary J. Blige, Jessica Simpson, Jennifer Lopez, Marc Anthony, Thalia, Destiny's Child, and many more.

Post-Exciters saw Rooney running his own cosmetics firm. He died on February 16, 1991.
