= Melvin Bliss =

- Born: Melvin McClelland; June 1, 1945
- Origin: Chicago, Illinois
- Died: July 7, 2010 (aged 65)
- Genre: Soul
- Years active: 1973–2010
- Label: Sunburst Records

Melvin McClelland (June 1, 1945-July 26, 2010) was a rhythm and blues singer known for his 1973 song "Reward/Synthetic Substitution", the B-side of which was heavily sampled in at least 94 hip hop songs such as "Real Niggaz Don't Die" and "Alwayz into Somethin'" by N.W.A, "O.G. Original Gangster" by Ice-T, "O.P.P." by Naughty by Nature and more recently "My Life" by 50 Cent, Eminem and Adam Levine.

Born in 1945 in Chicago as Melvin McClelland, his career didn't begin with music; rather, in the Armed Forces. After spending a few years singing in Naval bands, he departed the Navy in the mid-1950s. From there, he went from stage to stage until the early 1970s, when in an attempt to boost his career prospects he visited a Queensbridge concert hall intending to use it for self-promotion. While awaiting a meeting with the hall's owner, he encountered the mother of Herb Rooney and it emerged that he wanted a singer to record one of his compositions. After an informal discussion with Rooney himself, Bliss hit the studio to record it; the result was Reward. That song's B-side, "Synthetic Substitution", became one of the most sampled songs of all time. Bliss' label, Sunburst Records, was a sister company of Opal Productions, and in 1974 it went bankrupt, taking Sunburst Records with it; in doing so rendering Bliss a one-hit wonder.

In 2011, a documentary about him, Synthetic Substitution: The Life Story of Melvin Bliss, was released by Peripheral Enterprises. It was produced by Earl Holder.

== Death ==
On July 17, 2010, it was announced by Melvin Bliss Jr. that Bliss had suffered a heart attack and had been rushed to NewYork–Presbyterian Hospital. Just over a week later, on July 26, 2010, it was announced that Bliss had died.
