= Ced-Gee =

American rapper (born 1963)

Ced Gee
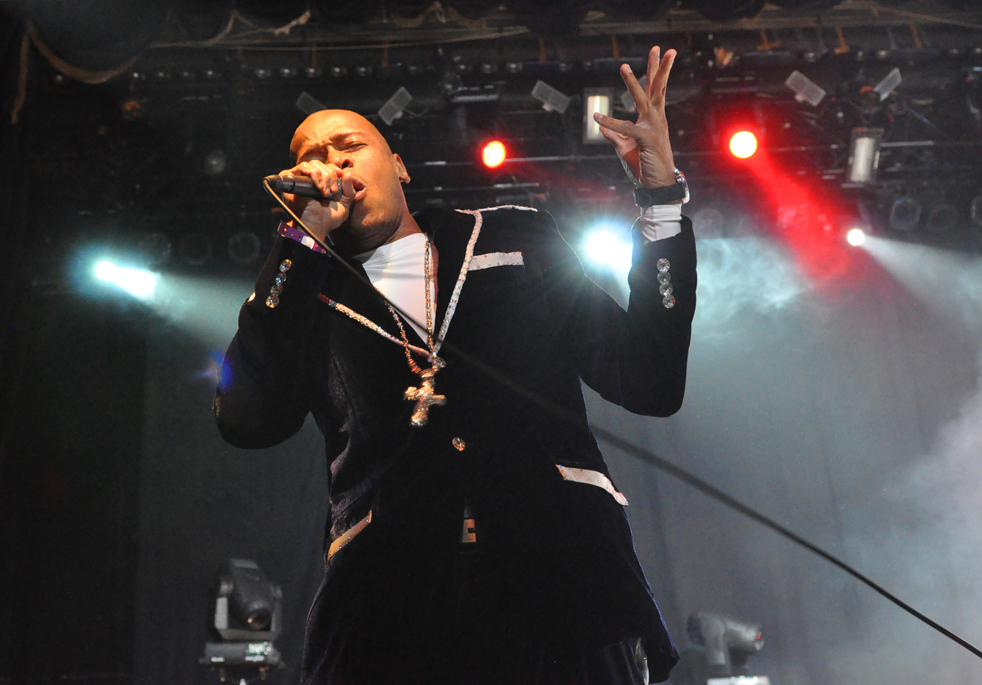
- Ced-Gee performing on October 1, 2011 in Asbury Park, New Jersey.

Background information
- Also known as: Delta Force One
- Born: Cedric Ulmont Miller; August 13, 1963 (age 62)
- Origin: The Bronx, New York City, U.S.
- Genres: Hip hop; underground hip hop; hardcore hip hop
- Occupations: Rapper; producer
- Instruments: Vocals; sampler; keyboards; bass guitar
- Years active: 1984–present
- Label: Next Plateau Records
- Member of: Ultramagnetic MCs
- Website: cedgee.com

Cedric "Ced-Gee" Miller (born 1963) is an American hip hop producer and rapper from the Bronx, New York. He is best known as a member of Ultramagnetic MCs. He received special thanks for his production on Boogie Down Productions' Criminal Minded, and he produced Tim Dog's "Fuck Compton". He has also worked alongside Antoinette, Bill Cosby, Blak Prophetz, Doug E. Fresh, Jeff Redd, Paperboy, Spaceman Patterson, Sybil, and Treacherous Three.

Ced-Gee has held positions as an A&R man and staff producer, a producer for Next Plateau Records, Wild Pitch Records, Mercury Records, Ruffhouse Records, Roadrunner Records, and Uptown Records.

== Discography ==
=== Solo ===
Studio albums

- 2004 – The Underground Show EP (CD) (The Factshen)

Singles

- 1998 – "Long Gev/The Impossible" (12") (3-2-1 Records)

=== With Ultramagnetic MCs ===
- 1988 – Critical Beatdown

=== Notable production credits and guest appearances ===
Albums

- 1987 - Criminal Minded by Boogie Down Productions
- 1993 - Idol the Bloodsport by MF911
- 2009 - Bill Cosby Presents the Cosnarati: State of Emergency by Bill Cosby

Songs

- 1986 - "Ego Trippin" by Ultramagnetic MCs.
- 1988 - "Soft But Deadly" by Finesse & Synquis
- 1989 - "Bad Beats Suite" by Sybil
- 1989 - "Girls" by Funkmaster Wizard Wiz
- 1989 - "You Need Stitches/Creston Avenue" by Grandmaster Caz
- 1991 - "The 900 Number (Remix 1/2/3)" by The 45 King
- 1991 - "Larry, That's What They Call Me (Hip Hop Remix)" by Larry the MC
- 1991 - "Fuck Compton", "You Ain't Shit", "Can't Fuck Around", "Goin' Wild in the Penile" and "Patriotic Pimp" by Tim Dog
- 1992 - "Chorus Line Pt. 2", "Poppa Large", "I Like Your Style", "Make It Happen", "Message From the Boss", "Go for Yours", "MC Champion" by Ultramagnetic MCs
- 1994 - "Ain't Nothing Changed" by Treacherous Three
- 1994 - "I'm Fuckin Flippin/New York What Is Funky" by Ultramagnetic MCs
- 1996 - "P's Cure (Real G Remix)" by Paperboy
- 2005 - "Intro" and "The Illest" by Blak Prophetz
- 2009 - "Magnetic Junkadelic" by Kool Keith
