= Bizzy Bone discography =

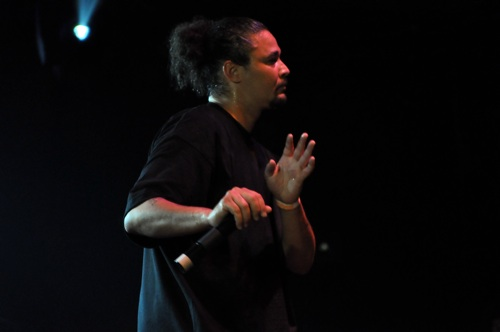
- Studio albums: 21
- Compilation albums: 8
- Singles: 7
- Music videos: 33
- Collaborative albums: 10

Bizzy Bone's discography includes 21 studio albums, 8 compilation albums and 7 singles. American rapper Bizzy Bone has released albums under 11 different record labels during his career and has been signed to major labels Virgin Records and Warner Bros. Records. He is currently signed to record label 7th Sign. Bizzy Bone has had 8 albums chart on the Billboard 200 chart. His debut album, Heaven'z Movie, released in 1998, peaked at no. 3 on the Billboard 200 and was certified platinum in the United States. Bizzy Bone has also released 31 music videos and 10 collaboration albums. He has made collaboration albums with artists including Layzie Bone and Bad Azz.

== Albums ==
=== Studio albums ===
List of studio albums, with selected chart positions and certifications
| Year | Album | Peak chart positions | | Certifications |
| Year | Album | US | US R&B | Certifications |
|---|---|---|---|---|
| 1998 | Heaven'z Movie: Released: October 6, 1998; Label: Ruthless / Relativity | 3 | 2 | RIAA: Gold |
| 2001 | The Gift: Released: March 20, 2001; Label: AMC | 44 | 19 | |
| 2004 | Alpha and Omega: Released: October 19, 2004; Label: Bungalo/Universal Music Group | 142 | 27 | |
| 2004 | The Beginning and the End: Released: November 7, 2004; Label: 7 Sign Records | | | |
| 2005 | Speaking in Tongues: Released: September 27, 2005; Label: SMC | 183 | 59 | |
| 2006 | Thugs Revenge: Released: February 28, 2006; Label: Thump | 168 | 39 | |
| 2006 | The Story: Released: March 21, 2006; Label: Real Talk | 98 | 12 | |
| 2006 | The Midwest Cowboy: Released: July 11, 2006; Label: Real Talk | 134 | 31 | |
| 2006 | Evolution of Elevation: Released: December 19, 2006; Label: Mob Life Records | | | |
| 2007 | Trials & Tribulations: Released: September 11, 2007; Label: Real Talk Entertainment | | | |
| 2008 | Ruthless: Released: March 4, 2008; Label: Siccness | | | |
| 2008 | A Song for You: Released: April 22, 2008; Label: After Platinum/Virgin | 148 | 28 | |
| 2009 | Back with the Thugz: Released: March 10, 2009; Label: Hi-Power | — | 52 | |
| 2009 | Back with the Thugz Part 2: Released: July 14, 2009; Label: Hi-Power | — | — | |
| 2010 | Crossroads: 2010: Released: August 24, 2010; Label: Sumerian/E1 | — | 35 | |
| 2014 | The Wonder Years: Released: July 7, 2014; Label: The Life Apparel | — | | |
| 2019 | Carbon Monoxide: Released: September 12, 2019; Label: Bizzy Bone | — | | |
| 2020 | The Mantra: Released: September 12, 2020; Label: Bizzy Bone | — | | |
| 2021 | War of Roses: Released: September 12, 2021; Label: Bizzy Bone | — | | |
| 2022 | I'm Busy: Released: September 12, 2022; Label: Bizzy Bone | — | | |
| 2023 | Tha Waste Lands: Released: September 12, 2023; Label: Bizzy Bone | — | | |
| 2024 | Bizzy Bone: Released: September 12, 2024; Label: Bizzy Bone | — | | |

=== Collaboration albums ===
- Bizzy Bone Presents: Double R with Double R (2003)
- Bone Brothers with Bone Brothers (2005)
- Bone Collector with Q Loco (2006)
- Bone Brothers 2 with Bone Brothers (2007)
- Bone Brothers 3 with Bone Brothers (2008)
- Still Creepin on Ah Come Up with Bone Brothers (2008)
- Thug Pound with Bad Azz (2009)
- Destination Ailleurs with Papillon Bandana (2010)
- Bone Collector 2 with Q Loco (2011)
- Countdown to Armageddon with AC Killer (2011)
- Battle of Armageddon with AC Killer (2015)
- New Waves with Krayzie Bone (2017)

=== Compilation albums ===
- The Best of Bizzy Bone (2007)
- Only One (2006)
- Revival (2008)
- The Best of Bizzy Bone 2 (2010)
- Greatest Rapper Alive (2010)
- Mr. Ouija (2011)
- 7th Sign Tribute Record: The Sign of Seven (2013)
- Criminal Nation Organization Vol 6: Best of Part One, The Criminal Nation Organization (2014)

== Extended plays ==
- For the Fans Vol. 1 (2005)
- From Your Righteousness (2009)

== Guest appearances ==
List of non-single guest appearances, with other performing artists, showing year released and album name
| Title | Year | Other artist(s) | Album |
|---|---|---|---|
| "Personal Freak" | 1997 | Adina Howard | Welcome to Fantasy Island |
| "Battle Cry" | 1998 | Gold, Maniski, Cody | In a Race Against Time |
| "Blade 4 Glory" | 1998 | Majesty | Blade (soundtrack) |
| "Way 2 Strong" | 1999 | —N/a | The PJs (soundtrack) |
| "Angels with Dirty Faces" | 1999 | Puff Daddy | Forever |
| "Doctor Doctor" | 1999 | DJ U-Neek | Ghetto Street Pharmacist |
| "Fried Day" | 1999 | Sam Dates | Next Friday (soundtrack) |
| "Ya Style" | 2000 | Sylk-E. Fyne, Snoop Dogg | Tha Cum Up |
| "We Ain't Scared" | 2002 | Lil' Flip | Undaground Legend |
| "R.I.P. Screw" | 2002 | Lil' Flip | Undaground Legend |
| "Front Line Homies" | 2002 | Layzie Bone | Tru Dawgs |
| "Money in a Ziploc Bag" | 2003 | Joker Tha Bailbondsman | Bipolar |
| "Twin Towers" | 2004 | Jim Jones | On My Way to Church |
| "Gangsta" | 2006 | Low Down ft Lost Cause | Can't Stop My Shine |
| "Sing This!" | 2009 | I See Stars | 3-D |
| "Think About Us" | 2009 | Fury, Code Orange | Plan B |
| "Ready for Warfare" | 2009 | Fury | Plan B |
| "Replay (Remix)" | 2009 | Iyaz, Sean Kingston, Nipsey Hussle & Rock City | |
| "Get a Lil Low" | 2009 | Ying Yang Twins | Ying Yang Forever |
| "Real Gangstas" | 2010 | The Game, Hurricane Chris | The Red Room |
| "Babylon" | 2011 | DJ Quik, BlaKKazz K.K. | The Book of David |
| "Across the Map" | 2011 | DJ Quik, Bun B | The Book of David |
| "Streets" | 2011 | Layzie Bone, Mr. Criminal | The New Revolution |
| "Still We Breathe" | 2012 | Crucified | The Birth of Tragedy |
| "Get Low" | 2012 | Boy Wonder DaOne, Young Luciano | |
| "Smoke You" | 2013 | Something Awful (Bizarre & Fury), Madicipha, Sean Strange | Taking Lives |
| "Murder on My Mind" | 2013 | Da Mafia 6ix, SpaceGhostPurrp, Krayzie Bone | 6iX Commandments |
| "Conscious Revolution" | 2015 | Traumatize, Flesh-n-Bone | Spawn 1991 |
| "Brand New Everything" | 2015 | Krayzie Bone | Chasing the Devil: Temptation |
| "Burn My Name" | 2017 | Chris Brown & Ray J | Burn My Name |
| "See the Light" | 2017 | Excel Beats | See the Light |
| "In the Way" | 2018 | Berner, Krayzie Bone & DJ Paul | Rico |
| "Prophecy" | 2018 | The Uncertain Certainty | This Is M.U.S.i.C. |
| "Don't Test Me" | 2018 | Durden | El Durdarino Vol. Go F**k Yourself |
| "Flawless" | 2018 | GainesFM | |
| "Wolfpack" | 2018 | AC Killer | The Unholy Trinity |
| "Lurical Elixir" | 2018 | OptiMystic, Mossy Fogg | Salty Waterz |
| "Take a Trip" | 2018 | Hard Head, Deacon & Jahzon | Take a Trip |
| "Monster" | 2018 | Rap P | |

== Music videos ==
| Year | Title | Director(s) |
|---|---|---|
| 1997 | "Give Up the Ghost" w/ Immature | |
| 1998 | "Thugz Cry" | |
| 1999 | "Doctor Doctor" w/ Gemini | |
| 1999 | "Nobody Can Stop Me" | Gregory Dark |
| 2000 | "Ya Style" w/ Snoop Dogg & Sylk-E-Fyne | |
| 2001 | "Father" | |
| 2004 | "Try Hustle Me" | |
| 2004 | "I Understand" | |
| 2005 | "Money in a Ziploc Bag" w/ Joker The Bailbondsman | |
| 2005 | "Hip Hop Baby" w/ Layzie Bone & Krayzie Bone | |
| 2008 | "Rollercoaster" w/ Layzie Bone | Jack Dee |
| 2008 | "A Song for You" w/ DMX & Chris Notez | Ethan Lader |
| 2008 | "1999" | Jack Dee |
| 2010 | "Life" w/ Ta Smallz | |
| 2010 | "Cheaters" w/ AC Killer | |
| 2012 | "The Craft" w/ Jahni Denver | Dave Patten |
| 2013 | "I Got Work" w/ Skeme | Dave Patten |
| 2013 | "Warriors pt 2" w/ Ac Killer and Krayzie Bone | |
| 2013 | "Hustlaz Anthem" w/ KrayFKR & Young Noble | |
| 2014 | "Hittin Hard" w/ The Gooneez | Victor Klaus |
| 2016 | "Run" w/ Burgos | Daniel Jaime |
| 2018 | "Already Gone" w/ MCKNY | Mehran C. Torgoley |
| 2018 | "Y.N.T.G" w/ Blais | |
| 2018 | "They Know" w/ Jab & Miss Escobar | |
| 2018 | "Wrapped Up" w/ Jcass | |
| 2018 | "Amazing" w/ Liquid Silva | |
| 2019 | "All I Know" w/ PeteRillo X | |
| 2019 | "Misery" w/ Excel Beats, Nasi Nassiri, T.C, Raego, Brother Clay | |
| 2019 | "Barz" w/ King Ozz and Keith Wallace | |
| 2019 | "Carbon Monoxide" | |
| 2019 | "Stalking Me" | |
| 2019 | "Alpha Mentality" | |
| 2020 | "Tony 2 Much – Bizzy 2 Much" w/Tony 2 Much | |
| 2020 | "Black Milk" | |
| 2020 | "Murder for Hire" | |
