= Poison Pen (album) =

Studio album by Chino XL
- Released: January 31, 2006
- Recorded: 2005−2006
- Genre: Hip-hop
- Length: 2:07:32
- Label: Activate Entertainment
- Producer: Bird; Buff William; Carlos Bess; Dan Charnas; Gennessee; Jason Figueroa a.k.a. Ghost; MoSS; N Kredible; One Eye; Proof; Stacey Castro (exec.); Derek Barbosa (exec.)

Chino XL chronology
I Told You So (2001)	Poison Pen (2006)	Something Sacred (2008)

Professional ratings
Review scores
Source	Rating
RapReviews	7.5/10 stars

Poison Pen is the third studio album by American rapper Chino XL. It was released on January 31, 2006 via Activate Entertainment. Production was handled by Bird, N Kredible, Buff William, Carlos Bess, Dan Charnas, Gennessee, Jason Figueroa a.k.a. Ghost, MoSS, One Eye and Proof. It features guest appearances from Killah Priest, Proof and The Beatnuts.

Fans anticipated this release ever since Chino XL's Poison Pen: The Lost Tapes, which featured the tracks "Beastin'", "Our Time", and "Wordsmith". Poison Pen was released as a 2-disc special collector's edition. Every copy was autographed by Chino XL with a silver "poison pen". The album was executive produced and A&R'd by Chino's then manager Stacey Castro.

== Track listing ==
Disc 1
No.	Title	Producer(s)	Length
1.	"Intro"		0:22
2.	"Poison Pen"	Dan Charnas	4:25
3.	"Even If It Kills Me"	One Eye	4:01
4.	"Messiah"	Bird; Jason Figueroa a.k.a. Ghost	2:50
5.	"Wordsmith Intro"		1:11
6.	"Wordsmith"	Bird	5:11
7.	"Beastin'" (featuring Killah Priest)	Carlos Bess	3:18
8.	"Skin"	N Kredible	7:01
9.	"Don't Fail Me Now" (featuring The Beatnuts)	Bird	4:06
10.	"Our Time" (featuring Proof)	Proof; MoSS	3:41
11.	"B-Boy Intro"		1:09
12.	"B-Boy/Gangsta"	Bird	4:54
13.	"Talk to You"	N Kredible	4:46
14.	"What You Lookin' At"	Gennessee	4:32
15.	"Can't Change Me"	Buff William	0:34
16.	"All I Wanna Do... (Bout Nothin')"	N Kredible	5:10
17.	"Nunca/What You Got" (Bonus Tracks)		10:24

Notes

- Disc 2 is a remixed by Power 106's Mr. Choc version of the album, sequenced by JBoogie and SugaShack. It also includes descriptions of each track by Chino XL.
- "Skin" features interpolations from the film 2003 film Identity.

Bonus material

- Aside from the bonus track "Nunca" at the end of "All I Wanna Do... (Bout Nuthin')", there are also bonus videos and links to unlock a special contest on the Poison Pen website.
- The song "Our Time" can also be found on Big Proof & Iron Fist present: Hand 2 Hand official Mixtape Instruction Manual under the title "The Beats, The Rhymes".
