= Something Sacred =

Studio album by Chino XL and Playalitical
- Released: January 15, 2008
- Recorded: 2007–2008
- Genre: Hip hop
- Length: 50:54
- Label: Illuminated Entertainment Group
- Producer: Playalitical (exec.)

Chino XL chronology
Poison Pen (2006)	Something Sacred (2008)	Ricanstruction: The Black Rosary (2012)

Playalitical chronology
Code Green (2006)	Something Sacred (2008)	Pipe Dreams (2009)

Professional ratings
Review scores
Source	Rating
RapReviews	8/10

Something Sacred is a collaborative studio album by American rappers Chino XL and Playalitical. It was released on January 15, 2008 via Illuminated Entertainment Group. Executively produced by Playalitical, it features guest appearances from Bizzy Bone, Duce Stabs, Spoke-In-Wordz and Supernatural.

== Track listing ==
No.	Title	Producer(s)	Length
1.	"Always Has Been, Always Will Be"	Playalitical	0:26
2.	"Jump Off"	Playalitical	4:36
3.	"Bat Signals Up"	Playalitical	3:54
4.	"All I Ever Hear" (featuring Duce Stabs)	Playalitical	2:48
5.	"License to Puke"	Playalitical	3:42
6.	"Violate You" (featuring Spoke-In-Wordz)	Playalitical	3:50
7.	"Stay in the Lines"	Playalitical	3:15
8.	"Body You" (featuring Supernatural)	Playalitical	2:37
9.	"Things to Do in Denver When Your Dead"	Playalitical	4:01
10.	"Posiden"	Playalitical	5:02
11.	"Something Sacred"	Playalitical	0:26
12.	"It's No Secret"	Playalitical	3:42
13.	"Let It Snow"	Playalitical	4:05
14.	"Be with You" (featuring Bizzy Bone)	Playalitical	3:27
15.	"Smoke Screen"	Playalitical	5:03
Total length:			50:54
