= Here to Save You All =

Studio album by Chino XL
- Released: April 9, 1996
- Recorded: 1995–January 1996
- Studio: Platinum Island Studios (New York, NY); Canyon Post Digital (Los Angeles, CA); Firehouse Studio (New York, NY); Kitchen Sync Studios (Hollywood, CA); Secret Six Studios
- Genre: Hip hop
- Length: 1:08:40
- Label: American
- Producer: Dan Charnas (also exec.); Bird; B Wiz; DJ Homicide; Eric Romero; KutMasta Kurt

Chino XL chronology
Here to Save You All (1996)	I Told You So (2001)

Singles from Here to Save You All
- 1. "No Complex / Waiting to Exhale" Released: March 23, 1996; 2. "Kreep" Released: July 22, 1996; 3. "Thousands / Freestyle Rhymes" Released: October 15, 1996; 4. "Deliver" Released: November 12, 1996; 5. "Rise / Jesus" Released: February 14, 1997

Here to Save You All is the debut studio album by American rapper Chino XL. It was released on April 9, 1996, through American Recordings. The recording sessions took place at Platinum Island Studios and Firehouse Studio in New York, at Canyon Post Digital and Kitchen Sync Studios in Los Angeles, and at Secret Six Studios. It was produced by B-Wiz, Bird, DJ Homicide, Eric Romero, KutMasta Kurt, and Dan Charnas, who also served as executive producer. It features guest appearances from Gravitation, Kool Keith and Ras Kass.

The album debuted at No. 56 on the Top R&B Albums and No. 39 on the Heatseekers Albums in the United States.

== Background ==
The lyrical content revolved around dark, hardcore themes (mostly metaphorical braggadoccio), dismissing the commercialized hip hop that was starting to gain momentum at this time. It contains the infamous but well-known song "Riiiot!" which had a line that possibly alluded to the rumor of West Coast rapper 2Pac being raped in prison. 2Pac later called him out on "Hit 'Em Up", and Chino responded with a freestyle diss. Chino himself stated that the line was not meant as a diss, and he and 2Pac were on good terms at the time of his death.

== Critical reception ==
Professional ratings
Review scores
Source	Rating
AllMusic	4/5 stars
Muzik	4/5 stars
RapReviews	9.5/10
Rolling Stone	3/5 stars
The Source	3.5/5 stars

The Los Angeles Times wrote that "Chino XL returns to some of the bold, freewheeling, brutally honest elements that have been missing in the money-hungry, over-commercialized genre, and he does it without fear of what it will do to his standing among his rap peers or in the commercial marketplace."

== Track listing ==
No.	Title	Writer(s)	Producer(s)	Length
1.	"Here to Save You All" (featuring Rosalin Harris)	Derek Barbosa; R. Stevens	B-Wiz	0:59
2.	"Deliver"	Barbosa; Kurt Matlin	KutMasta Kurt	3:29
3.	"No Complex" (featuring Jut Boogie)	Barbosa; Stevens	B-Wiz	4:40
4.	"Partner to Swing"	Barbosa; Stevens	B-Wiz	4:15
5.	"It's All Bad"	Barbosa; Stevens	B-Wiz	5:00
6.	"Freestyle Rhymes"	Barbosa; Lamont Holbdy	Bird	4:13
7.	"Riiiot!" (featuring Ras Kass)	Barbosa; John Austin; Holbdy	Bird	4:44
8.	"Waiting to Exhale" (featuring Gravitation)	Barbosa; Stevens; A. Thatcher; D. Youngblood; T. Walker	B-Wiz	3:26
9.	"What Am I?"	Barbosa; Stevens	B-Wiz	4:59
10.	"Feelin' Evil Again" (featuring Jamie Stewart)	Barbosa; Stevens	B-Wiz	3:32
11.	"Thousands"	Barbosa; Craig Bullock	DJ Homicide	4:11
12.	"Kreep"	Barbosa; Erik Romero	Erik Romero	5:18
13.	"Many Different Ways"	Barbosa; Stevens	B-Wiz	5:07
14.	"The Shabba-Doo Conspiracy" (featuring Kool Keith)	Barbosa; Keith Thornton; Stevens	B-Wiz	4:39
15.	"Ghetto Vampire"	Barbosa; Stevens	B-Wiz	4:47
16.	"Rise"	Barbosa; Dan Charnas	Dan Charnas	5:21
17.	"My Hero"			1:33
Total length:				1:08:40

Notes

- Tracks 17 to 59 are 4 to 5 seconds of silence and track 16 is 28 seconds of silence.

Sample credits

- Track 4 contains a sample from "Five/Four" by Gene Harris and a sample from "To the Break of Dawn" by LL Cool J.
- Track 5 contains a sample of "After the Dance (Instrumental Version)" by Marvin Gaye.
- Track 11 contains elements from "Success" by Fat Joe.
- Track 12 embodies portions of the composition "Creep" by Radiohead, contains samples of "In-A-Gadda-Da-Vida" by Iron Butterfly and samples of "Levitate" by the Brecker Brothers.
- Track 13 contains a sample of "Phony As You Wanna Be" by GZA, a sample from "Time's Up" by O.C. and a sample from "Worker Man" by Patra.
- Track 15 contains a sample of "The Sick Rose" by David Axelrod.
- Track 16 contains a sample from "Been Such a Long Time Gone" by Hugh Masekela and a sample from "Make Me Say It Again Girl" by the Isley Brothers.

== Personnel ==
- Derek "Chino XL" Barbosa – vocals
- Rosalin "Drama Child" Harris – vocals (track 1)
- Jamie Stewart – additional vocals (track 2)
- Jut Boogie – additional vocals (track 3)
- Dionna Brooks-Jackson – additional vocals (track 6), vocals (track 10)
- John "Ras Kass" Austin – vocals (track 7)
- Ab-Style – vocals (track 8)
- Duganz – vocals (track 8)
- Raggedy Man – vocals (track 8)
- Christine Palma – additional vocals (track 9)
- "Kool Keith" Thornton – vocals (track 14)
- Sheena Lester – additional vocals (track 15)
- Jay Vietnam – scratches (tracks: 4, 10)
- Craig "DJ Homicide" Bullock – scratches (track 9), producer (track 11)
- DJ Mark Luv – scratches (track 13)
- R. "B-Wiz" Stevens – producer (tracks: 1, 3–5, 8–10, 13–15)
- "KutMasta Kurt" Matlin – producer (track 2)
- Lamont "Bird" Holbdy – producer (tracks: 6, 7)
- Erik Romero – producer (track 12)
- Dan Charnas – producer (track 16), recording (tracks: 9, 14, 15), executive producer
- Chip Mullaney – recording (track 2)
- Carlos Bess – recording (tracks: 3–5, 8, 12, 13), mixing (tracks: 8, 12)
- Sean Freehill – recording (tracks: 6, 7, 10, 13, 15, 16), mixing (tracks: 3–7, 9, 10, 13–16)
- Rod "King Tech" Sepand – mixing (track 3)
- Tom Coyne – mastering
- Stephen Stickler – photography

== Charts ==
Chart (1996)	Peak position
US Top R&B Albums (Billboard)	56
US Heatseekers Albums (Billboard)	39
