= Playalitical =

American rapper and producer and owner (1982–2020)

- Born: March 7, 1982; Denver, Colorado, U.S.
- Died: September 15, 2020 (aged 38) Arvada, Colorado U.S.
- Genres: Hip-hop
- Occupations: Rapper; record producer
- Years active: 2001—2020
- Labels: Illuminated Entertainment Group; Koch Entertainment; Select-O-Hits Music and Video Distribution; Kritikal Records

Playalitical (born Dustin Robbins; March 7, 1982 – September 15, 2020) was an American rapper and producer and the owner of Illuminated Entertainment Group. He's done songs with Snoop Dogg, E-40, Rappin' 4-Tay, Young Joc, Lil' Flip and Chino XL as well as produced albums for Bizzy Bone, Young Droop, Lighter Shade of Brown and Zig Zag of NB Ridaz and Ryan Tru G Gaddy.

== Career ==
Playalitical's debut album "Code Green" was released in 2006 and re-released in 2007, although he had previously released various mixtapes and tracks for compilations.

In 2006, he also signed Bizzy Bone, member of the multi-platinum Grammy Award-winning rap group Bone Thugs-N-Harmony, to his label for a one album record deal. The album, Bizzy Bone's The Midwest Cowboy, was produced by Playalitical and released July 11, 2006 through Real Talk Ent. After this and the release of his Code Green album he moved on to produce the "King Me" album for rap artist Young Droop, which was later released February 12, 2008. He and moviestar/rapper Chino XL began working on a group album together entitled Something Sacred, which was released January 15, 2008.

Playalitical has produced numerous other albums for artist's like Ala Wrek, Young Droop, Bizzy Bone, Duce Stabs, and Spoke-In-Wordz. In 2007 he signed a non-exclusive label deal with the major distribution company Select-O-Hits. The Code Green album was re-released by Select-O-Hits. In 2011 he produced the Lighter Shade of Brown album "It's A Wrap" released November 18, 2011. "Call Me Over" was the single and featured Playalitical and NB Ridaz. on Feb 12 2012 rap artist Young Droop and Playalitical released a group album entitled "Chosen Children" a digital only EP. He released 3 free digital mixtapes on Datpiff, SoundCloud, and similar sites before releasing his solo album "Wedding Band" in 2016.

== Death ==
Playalitical died of natural causes at a group home in Arvada, Colorado, at the age of 38.

== Discography ==
=== Solo ===
Album information
Code Green
- Released: May 1, 2006 Re-released 8-21-2007
- Billboard 200 chart position: -
- R&B/Hip-Hop chart position: #98
- Singles: "Its Been One", "Doin It Wrong"(with Bizzy Bone)"
Something Sacred (with Chino XL)
- Released: January 15, 2008
- Billboard 200 chart position: -
- R&B/Hip-Hop chart position:
- Singles: "Be with You" (featuring Bizzy Bone)
Pipe Dreams
- Released: February 23, 2009
- Billboard 200 chart position: -
- R&B/Hip-Hop chart position:
- Singles: "Bygones Be Gone"
Americon
- Released: May 1, 2004 re-release coming soon
- Billboard 200 chart position: -
- R&B/Hip-Hop chart position:
- Singles: "The last rapping(featuring 777 of 2pacs outlaws and Morning Star)"
Political Playboy Music
- Released: Dec 6, 2011
- Billboard 200 chart position: -
- R&B/Hip-Hop chart position:
- Singles: "Checkin My Fresh (feat Zig Zag of NB Ridaz), Bounce It Like A Bad Check (feat E40 and Rappin 4-Tay)

=== Produced ===
Album information
Bizzy Bone - The Midwest Cowboy
- Released: July 11, 2006
- Billboard 200 chart position: 164
- R&B/Hip-Hop chart position: 65
- Singles: "Thugz Need Love Too(featuring Playalitical)"
Young Droop - King Me
- Released: Feb 26, 2008
- Billboard 200 chart position: 197
- R&B/Hip-Hop chart position: 78
- Singles: "Like Dis Like Dat"
Duce Stabs - I'm So Screwed
- Released: May 10, 2005
- Billboard 200 chart position:
- R&B/Hip-Hop chart position:
- Singles:
Ala Wrek - Wreckonize
- Released: Sep 18, 2003
- Billboard 200 chart position:
- R&B/Hip-Hop chart position:
- Singles:
Spoke-In-Wordz - Word Play
- Released: Nov 3, 2007
- Billboard 200 chart position:
- R&B/Hip-Hop chart position:
- Singles: "Blown Away(featuring Bizzy Bone)"
Lighter Shade of Brown - It's a Wrap
- Released: October 11, 2011
- Billboard 200 chart position:
- R&B/Hip-Hop chart position: 81
- Singles: "Call Me Over(feat Playalitical & Zig Zag of NB Ridaz)What Ya Gon Do(featuring Playalitical)"

=== Compilations/Mixtapes ===
Album information
Catch the Buzz Vol. 1
- Released: June 6, 2002
- Billboard 200 chart position:
- R&B/Hip-Hop chart position:
- Features: "Don Blas & Jadakiss"
Catch the Buzz Vol. 2
- Released: January 1, 2003
- Billboard 200 chart position: -
- R&B/Hip-Hop chart position:
- Features: "Duce Stabs, 777 of 2pacs Outlaws and Sir Sqausha"
Underground Bosses
- Released: March 20, 2004
- Billboard 200 chart position: -
- R&B/Hip-Hop chart position:
- Features: "Duce Stabs, Big Herb from KS107.5 and Sir Squasha"
Denver's Most Wanted Vol. 3
- Released: May 5, 2009
- Billboard 200 chart position: -
- R&B/Hip-Hop chart position:
- Features: "Tech N9ne, J Diggs, Mr Kee, Simes Carter,

Daz Dillinger, Dank 1, Black C, Spoke-In-Wordz"

Catch the Buzz Vol. 3
- Released: Dec 29, 2009 re-release coming soon
- Billboard 200 chart position: -
- R&B/Hip-Hop chart position:
- Features: "DJ Chonz, Snoop Dogg, Rhymefest, The Procussions,

San Quinn, Supernatural, Chino XL, Bizzy Bone, Young Droop

=== Singles ===
| Year | Singles | U.S. Hot 100 | U.S. R&B | U.S. Rap | Album |
|---|---|---|---|---|---|
| 2006 | "Doin It Wrong" (with Bizzy Bone) | - | - | 73 | Code Green: Operation Takeover |
| 2006 | "It's Goin' Down [Remix]" (Yung Joc featuring Playalitical) | 3 | 1 | 1 | New Joc City |
| 2006 | "Thugz Need Love Too" (Bizzy Bone featuring Playalitical) | - | 71 | 27 | The Midwest Cowboy |
| 2006 | "Its Been One" (featuring Lil' Flip) | - | - | 61 | Code Green: Operation Takeover |
| 2007 | "Buy U a Drank [Remix] " (T-Pain featuring Playalitical & Yung Joc) | 92 | 37 | 18 | Epiphany |
