= I Told You So (Chino XL album) =

Studio album by Chino XL
- Released: August 21, 2001
- Genre: Hip hop
- Length: 73:19
- Label: Metro
- Producer: Buff William; Carlos Bess; Chino XL; Dan Charnas; J Dilla; Mixture; Nick Wiz; One Eye; AD; Rock The World

Chino XL chronology
Here to Save You All (1996)	I Told You So (2001)	Poison Pen (2006)

Professional ratings
Review scores
Source	Rating
HipHopDX	3/5
RapReviews	7.5/10
Sputnikmusic	3.5/5

I Told You So is the second studio album by American rapper Chino XL. It was slated to be released via Warner Records, and the catalogue number 47710 was assigned to the release, but Warner closed their Black music department shortly after the release of the promotional single "Let 'Em Live". The album was released on August 21, 2001, through Metro Records.

The album was produced by Dan Charnas, Chino XL, Chris Jackson, Nick Wiz, Carlos Bess, J Dilla, Mixture, Buff William, One Eye, and Rock the World. It features guest appearances from Aziz, B-Real, Kool G Rap, MaryAnne, Saafir, and Shaunta.

The album didn't make it to the Billboard 200, however it peaked at number 98 on the Billboard Top R&B/Hip-Hop Albums chart in the United States.

== Track listing ==
No.	Title	Writer(s)	Producer(s)	Length
1.	"Rude Awakening" (featuring Aziz)	Derek Barbosa	Dan Charnas; Chino XL	0:59
2.	"What You Got"	Barbosa; Nicholas Loizides	Nick Wiz	4:18
3.	"History"	Barbosa	Dan Charnas; Chino XL	1:38
4.	"Nunca"	Barbosa; Carlos Bess	Carlos Bess	4:19
5.	"That Would Be Me"	Barbosa; Loizides	Nick Wiz	1:15
6.	"Last Laugh" (featuring B-Real)	Barbosa; Louis Freese; Loizides	Nick Wiz	4:21
7.	"Let 'Em Live" (featuring Kool G Rap)	Barbosa; Nathaniel Wilson; Loizides	Nick Wiz	3:38
8.	"Water"	Barbosa; Bess	Carlos Bess	4:19
9.	"Baby Momma"	Barbosa	Dan Charnas; Chino XL	0:45
10.	"Sorry" (featuring Shaunta)	Barbosa; Shaunta Montgomery	Rock The World	3:53
11.	"Chino XL"	Barbosa; Adrian Nurse	AD	3:58
12.	"Chinophone, Pt. 1"	Barbosa	Dan Charnas; Chino XL	1:05
13.	"You Don't Want It"	Barbosa; Loizides	Nick Wiz	3:29
14.	"Beef"	Barbosa; Kasem Coleman	Mixture	3:29
15.	"Chinophone, Pt. 2"	Barbosa	Dan Charnas; Chino XL	0:31
16.	"I Told You So"	Barbosa; Coleman	Mixture	4:06
17.	"Don't Say a Word"	Barbosa; James Yancey	Jay Dee	4:13
18.	"Chino Fans"	Barbosa	Dan Charnas; Chino XL	0:26
19.	"It's My World"	Barbosa; Loizides	Nick Wiz	4:17
20.	"Ass-In-An-Instant" (featuring MaryAnne)	Barbosa	Dan Charnas; Chino XL	1:22
21.	"Chianardo Di Caprio"	Barbosa; William Darby	Buff William	5:31
22.	"Be Here"	Barbosa; Donald Saunders	One Eye	1:32
23.	"How It Goes" (featuring Saafir)		Jay Dee	4:57
24.	Untitled			4:31
Total length:				1:13:09

Notes

- Tracks 23 and 24 are untitled bonus tracks

Sample credits

- Track 8 contains lyrics from "Something in the Water (Does Not Compute)" by Prince
- Track 10 contains elements from "I Forgot To Be Your Lover" by William Bell.
- Track 22 contains replayed elements from "Little Child Runnin' Wild" by Curtis Mayfield.

== Personnel ==
- Derek "Chino XL" Barbosa – vocals, producer (tracks: 1, 3, 9, 12, 15, 18, 20), executive producer
- Aziz Collins – vocals (track 1)
- Shaunta Montgomery – additional vocals (track 2), vocals (track 10)
- Louis "B-Real" Freese – vocals (track 6)
- Nathaniel "Kool G Rap" Wilson – vocals (track 7)
- Jamie Stewart – additional vocals (track 16)
- Alando "U.G." Outlaw – additional vocals (track 19)
- MaryAnne – vocals (track 20)
- Reggie "Saafir" Gibson – vocals (track 23)
- Dan Charnas – producer (tracks: 1, 3, 9, 12, 15, 18, 20), executive producer
- Nicholas "Nick Wiz" Loizides – producer (tracks: 2, 5–7, 13, 19)
- Carlos Bess – producer (tracks: 4, 8)
- Rock The World – producer (track 10)
- Kasem "Mixture" Coleman – producer (tracks: 14, 16)
- Adrian “AD” Nurse — producer (track 11)
- James "J Dilla" Yancey – producer (tracks: 17, 23)
- "Buff William" Darby – producer (track 21)
- Donald "One Eye" Saunders – producer (track 22)
- Chip Mullaney – recording & mixing (tracks: 1, 3, 9, 12, 15, 18, 20)
- Ken Johnston – recording (tracks: 2, 4, 5, 8, 11, 14, 16, 21), mixing (tracks: 4, 8, 14, 16)
- Sean Freehill – recording (tracks: 2, 5–7, 10, 11, 13, 17, 19, 22), mixing (tracks: 2, 5–7, 10, 11, 13, 17, 19, 21, 22)
- Todd Fairall – recording (track 17)
- Tom Coyne – mastering
- Chris Jackson – executive producer

== Charts ==
Chart (2001)	Peak position
US Top R&B/Hip-Hop Albums (Billboard)	98
