= Chino XL =

American rapper (1974–2024)

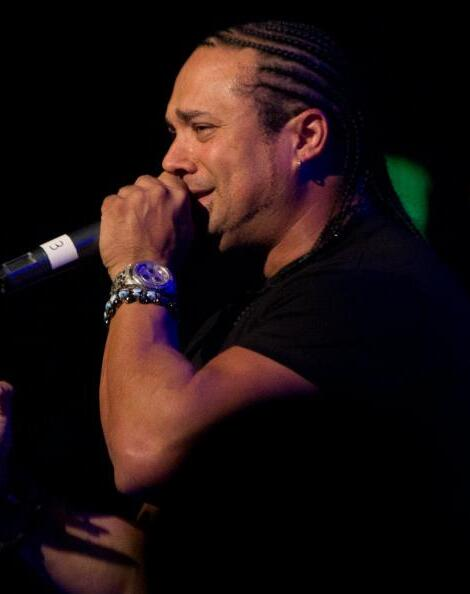
- Chino XL performing in 2012

Background information
- Born: Derek Keith Barbosa; April 8, 1974; The Bronx, New York City, U.S.
- Origin: East Orange, New Jersey, U.S.
- Died: July 28, 2024 (aged 50)
- Genres: East Coast hip-hop
- Occupations: Rapper; actor
- Years active: 1991–2024
- Labels: American; Warner Bros.; Metro; Activate; Bungalo; Machete Music; Universal; Viper

Derek Keith Barbosa (April 8, 1974 – July 28, 2024), better known by his stage name Chino XL, was an American rapper and actor. He was known for his evocative wordplay and for warring with Tupac Shakur.

He recorded 8 solo studio albums and 2 extended plays. His album Ricanstruction: The Black Rosary (2012) won the 2012 HHUG Album of the Year Award.

== Early life ==
Born in the Bronx, New York, Derek Barbosa grew up in East Orange, New Jersey. He was raised by his single mother (African American) and his father was of Puerto Rican descent.

== Career ==
After co-founding the duo Art of Origin with Kerri Chandler, "Chino XL" (as he was called from then on) was signed at age 16 by music impresario Rick Rubin to his American Recordings label, at the time a member of the Warner Bros. Records family.

=== Debut album ===
Barbosa released his debut album Here to Save You All in 1996, to critical acclaim. The lead single "Kreep", which featured an interpolation of the Radiohead song "Creep" received major airplay by radio and MTV. "Kreep" charted on the Billboard Bubbling Under R&B Chart for a record 23 weeks, from July 1996 to January 1997. Here to Save You All was A&R'd by Dan Charnas. It also included the single "No Complex".

Chino was released from his American Recordings contract when the label switched distributors from Warner Bros. Records to Columbia Records in 1997.

=== Other record deals and recordings ===
Warner Bros. Records signed Chino in the fall of 1997. His second album was due to come out in April 1999 but numerous delays prevented this. In early 2001, when the album's lead single "Let 'Em Live" featuring Kool G Rap was about to appear, Chino was dropped by Warner, as they folded their Black music department, allegedly due to the public legal battle with Prince. The album was eventually released in 2001 by Metro Records under the title I Told You So.

Chino worked with rock engineer Kent Hitchcock to bring Poison Pen to life. The lyricist/emcee co-executive produced this 3rd studio album (2006), which introduced “Wordsmith” and featured appearances by Proof of D-12, Killah Priest and hip-hop duo The Beatnuts. The title track is produced by Dan Charnas, pulled from 1996 sessions while still signed to Rubin’s label.

In 2007, Chino signed a contract with the Universal Latino label Machete Music.

In 2009, Chino's fourth album RICANstruction was released via his own joint venture with Universal Music. The album featured appearances by Immortal Technique, Tech N9ne, and Bun B and was produced by DJ Khalil, with 5x Grammy winner Focus acting as executive producer.

On August 19, 2011, a song titled "N.I.C.E.", produced by Nick Wiz, was released.

On September 25, 2012, the album Ricanstruction: The Black Rosary was released as a double disc through Immortal Technique's Viper Records. It won the 2012 HHUG Album of the Year award

In 2015, he was featured on UK singer/rapper RKZ's single 'They Don't Know Nothing'.

In late 2019, Freemusicempire wrote that Chino XL is "The greatest name-checker in rap history" Dan-O wrote "Chino XL has a career full of jaw dropping name drops that don't benefit him at all. In 1996 he was clowning OJ Simpson, in 2012 he was making fun of Muhammed Ali's brain stem. If you are going to drop the name of someone important do 2 things for me A.) don't walk it back and apologize B.) make it heinous. Do it out of an unparalleled fearlessness. Shake the world up so the people who feel safe don't anymore….and when the consequences come take them like a seasoned criminal takes a sentence. Or don't do it at all."

=== 2020–2024 ===
In December 2020, he released a joint extended play "Chino vs. Balt" with Balt Getty, under Purplehaus Records. The project included three music videos.

In 2022, it was reported he was working on a new album, which would include a collaboration with R.A. the Rugged Man.

In 2023, Chino XL reunited with Stu Bangas to release the LP God’s Carpenter, a 12-song album featuring Vinnie Paz on the single "Murder Rhyme Kill". Additional singles included "AMBImonsterous" and the title track "God’s Carpenter".

Shortly before his death, he contributed to the song "Pendulum Swing", from an album called G.O.Ds NETWORK: REB7RTH, assembled using production and verses licensed from Rakim.

=== Acting career ===
In addition to his music career, Chino XL went on to appear in numerous films and on television, subsequently appearing as a guest star on the Comedy Central series Reno 911!, and CBS series CSI: Miami. His feature film credits include a co-starring role opposite Kate Hudson and Luke Wilson in director Rob Reiner's Alex & Emma (Warner Bros. Pictures) and several indie films, including Brandon Sonnier's The Beat, which premiered at the Sundance Film Festival.

== Personal life ==
Barbosa was the nephew of Bernie Worrell of the music group Parliament/Funkadelic, and was also a member of Mensa International.

== Death ==
Barbosa died at his home by suicide through ligature hanging on July 28, 2024. He was 50.

== Discography ==
=== Solo albums ===
- Here to Save You All (1996)
- I Told You So (2001)
- Poison Pen (2006)
- Ricanstruction: The Black Rosary (2012)
- God’s Carpenter (with Stu Bangas) (2023)

=== Posthumous albums ===
- Darkness & Other Colors (2024)
- Map of Bones (presented by DJ Fokus) (2025)
- Prelude to the Mantis (2026)
- Necksnapper (with Canibus) (2026)

=== Collaboration albums ===
- Something Sacred (with Playalitical) (2008)
- You Can't Win (with T-Bone) (2005)

=== Extended plays ===
- Chino vs. Balt (with Balt Getty) (2020)

=== Singles ===
- "No Slow Rollin'" (with Art of Origin) (1992)
- "Un-Rational" (with Art of Origin) (1993)
- "Purple Hands in the Air / Dark Night of the Bloodspiller" (1994)
- "Kreep" (1996)
- "No Complex / Waiting to Exhale" (1996)
- "Thousands / Freestyle Rhymes" (1996)
- "Deliver" (1996)
- "Rise / Jesus" (1997)
- "Let 'Em Live" (2000)
- "Last Laugh" (2001) Vs (1998)
- "What You Got / Let 'Em Live" (2001)
- "Don't Run from Me / Warning" (2006)
- "Poison Pen" (2006)
- "Messiah" (2006)
- "Jump Back" (2007)
- "Lick Shots" (with Immortal Technique and Crooked I) (2008)
- "Chow Down" (with Playalitical) (2008)
- "N.I.C.E." (2012)
- "Arm Yourself" (with DV Alias Khrist, Sick Jacken and Immortal Technique) (2012)
- "Kings" (with Big Pun) (2012)
- "They Don't Know Nothing" (with RKZ) (2015)
- "March of the Imperial" (with D.CrazE the Destroyer) (2016)
- "Under the Bridge" (with Rama Duke) (2018)
- "Ascending to Mytikas" (with Fuzzy Ed) (2022)

=== Notable guest appearances ===
- Tha Mexakinz - Tha Mexakinz
- Main One - Bring the Drama 12"
- Saafir - Not fa Nothin' 12"
- Sway & King Tech - The Anthem
- RA the Rugged Man - Slayer's Club
- Immortal Technique - Lick Shots
- Kool G Rap - Come See Me

== Filmography ==
- Barrio Wars as Osirus (2002)
- Vatos as Vargas (2002)
- The Beat as Crazy 8 (2002)
- Crime Partners as Finesse (2003)
- Alex & Emma as Tony / Flamenco Dancer #2 (2003)
- Playas Ball as Tico (2003)
- The Young and the Restless (TV series) as Buzz (2004)
- Reno 911! (TV series) as Hymning Perp #3 (2004)
- Gang Warz as Ro Conner (2004)
- CSI: Miami as Juan Carlos (2006) (Episode: "Death Pool 100")
- El show (TV Series) as Professor xl (2008)
- Zane's Sex Chronicles (TV series) as Syndicator (2010)
