= Ricanstruction: The Black Rosary =

Studio album by Chino XL
- Released: September 25, 2012
- Recorded: 2008–2012
- Genre: Hip hop
- Length: 2:13:29
- Label: Viper Records
- Producer: Bobby Boutit (exec.); Chino XL (exec.); Apollo Brown; DJ Khalil; E-Swift; Exile; Focus...; House Shoes; Izzy the Kidd; J. Thrill; Kwamé; Level 13; Lounge Lizzards; Nick Wiz; Oh No; Sid Roams; Soul Professa; Southpaw; Stu Bangas; Toba Beats; Wyldfyer

Chino XL chronology
Something Sacred (2008)	Ricanstruction: The Black Rosary (2012)	God's Carpenter (2023)

Professional ratings
Review scores
Source	Rating
AllMusic	3.5/5 stars
HipHopDX	3.5/5
RapReviews	7.5/10

Ricanstruction: The Black Rosary is the fourth studio album by American rapper Chino XL. It was released on September 25, 2012 via Viper Records. The album won the 2012 HHUG Album of the Year award

== Track listing ==
=== Disc 1 ===
Scalpel Disc

No.	Title	Producer(s)	Length
1.	"Rain" (Additional vocals by DJ Romes)		0:28
2.	"Father's Day"	Apollo Brown	4:14
3.	"Eight Beginnings" (featuring Mystic)	Apollo Brown	1:35
4.	"Have 2"	E-Swift	2:54
5.	"It's Not Too L8te"	Stu Bangas	3:11
6.	"Wicked Church" (Additional vocals By Ms. Germ Free)	Toba Beats	4:25
7.	"Silent Art Child" (Additional vocals By Jahiara)	Southpaw	5:05
8.	"Broken Halo"	Sid Roams	3:13
9.	"Anything"	Wyldfyer	3:49
10.	"Hell Song" (featuring Tech N9ne)	Wyldfyer	3:34
11.	"Bad Man Bible"	Wyldfyer	5:05
12.	"Mama Told Me" (Additional vocals By Akili Nickson)	DJ Khalil; J. Thrill	4:31
13.	"Afraid of Nothing" (Additional vocals By Somaya Reese)	Kwamé	4:22
14.	"Can Be"	Apollo Brown	4:18
15.	"Arm Yourself" (featuring Sick Jacken, Immortal Technique & DV Alias Khrist)	Wyldfyer	5:24
16.	"No Damn Good for Me (Scarlet Intro)"	Lounge Lizzards	1:55
17.	"Sleep in Scarlet"	Focus...	5:15
18.	"Nahh"	Focus...	4:59
19.	"Eye"	DJ House Shoes	4:16
20.	"Regarding Elizabeth (Save Me)" (featuring Travis Barker)	Soul Professa	3:55

=== Disk 2 ===
Chapel Disk

No.	Title	Producer(s)	Length
1.	"Black Rosary 8am"	Apollo Brown	1:22
2.	"Closer to God"	Oh No	5:04
3.	"Little Man"	Focus...	4:46
4.	"Figure It Out"	Focus...	5:13
5.	"Xross Your Heart" (featuring Bun B)	Focus...	3:05
6.	"Buried in Vocabulary" (featuring the Horse Shoe Gang)	Level 13	5:22
7.	"Missing You 8pm (Interlude)" (Additional vocals By Saliqa Khan)	Apollo Brown	1:52
8.	"Crazy Love"	Exile	3:48
9.	"Take It Back" (featuring Rakaa & Roc Marciano)	Apollo Brown	4:19
10.	"N.I.C.E."	Nick Wiz	4:15
11.	"Kings" (featuring Big Pun)	Focus...	3:35
12.	"90 Bars of Intervention"	Focus...	3:53
13.	"The Hype Man (Interlude)" (Additional vocals By Bobby Bout It, Nergela, CF, DJ Romes & DJ Boxy Dee)	Soul Professa	1:38
14.	"Latino's Stand Up (RMX)" (featuring Sick Jacken, Thirstin Howl III, Kid Frost, Sinful & B-Real)	Focus...	4:09
15.	"Gone"	Izzy the Kid	4:40
Total length:			2:13:29
