= Kreep (song) =

Single by Chino XL

from the album Here to Save You All
- Released: July 22, 1996
- Recorded: 1996
- Genre: Hip hop
- Length: 5:20
- Label: American
- Songwriters: Derek Barbosa, Colin Greenwood, Jonny Greenwood, Albert Hammond, Mike Hazlewood, Eric Romero, Philip Selway, Thomas Yorke
- Producer: Eric Romero

Chino XL singles chronology
"Purple Hands in the Air/Dark Night of the Bloodspiller" (1994)	"Kreep (song)" (1996)	"No Complex" (1996)

"Kreep" is the second single from rapper Chino XL's debut album Here to Save You All. It is produced by Eric Romero, who uses elements from "In-A-Gadda-Da-Vida" by Iron Butterfly, "Levitate" by Brecker Brothers, and "Repent Walpurgis" by Procol Harum for the drums. Additionally the song interpolates portions from the song "Creep" by rock group Radiohead and "You Are Everything" by the Stylistics. This is perhaps Chino XL's best-known song and his most successful, reaching number one the Billboard Bubbling Under R&B Singles Chart. It remained number one for two weeks and remained on the chart for 23 weeks from July 1996 to January 1997. Kreep also charted on the Billboard Hot Rap Singles Chart, peaking at number 41 and reached its peak on the week of September 21, 1996.

== Background and Composition ==
The subject matter of the song deals with emotions of love, revenge "Should I take the .380 assassinate her like Selena" and depression "I want her back, but I know that I can't force her thinkin' bout takin' my own life like Marlon Brando's daughter." The chorus contains an interpolation of "Creep" by Radiohead:

I'm a kreep, I'm a loser You're so very special, I wish I was special But I'm a kreep, I'm a loser I wish I was special, I wish I was special But I'm a kreep

The song also contains an interpolation of the song "You Are Everything" by The Stylistics:

"Yesterday I seen someone who looked just like you She walked like you do, so I thought it was you"

== Critical acclaim ==
According to Chino XL the interpolation was cleared by Radiohead in two days. A reason being Radiohead lead singer Thom Yorke's appreciation for the song. Thom Yorke was quoted as saying "Chino made my song better than I made it" in a 1996 interview.

== Music videos ==
Two versions of the music video exist. A version which is intended for the album version and a video intended for the video remix which received the most airplay from MTV. Both videos are similar with minor scenes edited out. The video for the album version is not censored while the video remix version is heavily censored. Both videos were directed by Nancy Bennett.

== Song versions ==
There are several different versions (and duration lengths) of Kreep recorded and released by Chino XL.

- Kreep (Album Version Clean Edit) - 4:34 (Original Album Version)
- Kreep (Album Version Edit Instrumental) - 4:31 (Original Album Version Instrumental)
- Kreep (Video Remix Clean Edit) - 4:30 (Clean Video Remix Shortened)
- Kreep (Video Remix Original Full-Length) - 4:58 (Video Remix Uncensored Full Length)
- Kreep (Video Remix Instrumental) - 4:58 (Video Remix Instrumental)
- Kreep (Kreepappella) - 5:08 (Acapella From Both Versions)
- Kreep (Dirty Linen Remix Original) - 4:45 (Remix With Different Lyrics and instrumental)
- Kreep (Dirty Linen Remix Instrumental) - 4:46 (Instrumental From Dirty Linen Remix)

== Personnel ==
- Writer – Derek "Chino XL" Barbosa
- Original Album Version Producer - Eric Romero
- Video Remix Producer - KutMasta Kurt
- Dirty Linen Remix Producer - Dj Homicide
- Video direction – Nancy Bennet

== Charts ==
Chart (1996–97)	Peak position
US Hot Rap Songs (Billboard)	45
