= Yulianna =

American singer-songwriter (born 1982)

Julie King
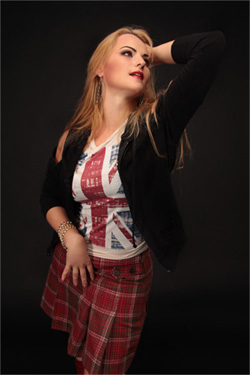
- Born: Yuliya Vladimirovna Zinovieva; May 26, 1982 (age 44); Almaty, Kazakhstan
- Other name: Julie King, Yulia, Yulianna
- Education: California Institute of the Arts
- Occupations: Singer; songwriter; actress; sound healer; musician; breath work facilitator; dancer
- Years active: 2000–present
- Musical career
- Genres: Pop; electronic; Operatic pop; rock
- Instruments: vocals; guitar
- Labels: Zvon Entertainment, LLC.; Jai Key, LLC
- Website: juliekingmusic.com

Julie King (born May 26, 1982), known as Yulianna, is an American singer-songwriter. She achieved popularity in the early 2000s by combining classical training with mainstream pop music, and her song "Don't Take Your Love Away" charted at number 1 on the Billboard Dance/Club Songs Chart in 2013. Yulianna has been credited with coining the term popra for the combination of pop and opera.

== Early life and training ==
Born in Almaty, Kazakhstan, in the former Soviet Union, King was trained as a vocalist and violinist. She grew up in Santa Barbara, California, and earned a master's degree at the California Institute of the Arts before moving to Los Angeles to pursue a career in entertainment.

King's early career included vocal training with Russian opera singer Vladimir Chernov (now a music professor at the University of California, Los Angeles) and the composer Daniel Catán.

== Career ==
In 2009, King met with music producer Robin Nixon, and the two went on to produce her first album, La-La-Land.

In 2012, she released her first single, "Race Car", with help from Nixon. "Race Car" was generally well received by critics, and the music video, directed by Waleed Moursi, won Best Music Video at the 2012 Colorado Film Festival.

King's first hit was "Forgiveness", a collaboration with Walter Afanasieff. The song and video garnered over a million views on YouTube. It was submitted for Best Instrumental Arrangement Accompanying Vocalist for the 55th Annual Grammy Awards in 2012. The video won several awards, including Best Music Video at the Naperville Film Festival and the Las Vegas Film Festival.

In 2013, King released her first full-length dance album, Californ-i-a, written and produced with RAS and Spencer Nezey. Californ-i-a featuring The Game, was well received by critics and was distributed internationally. The single "Don't Take Your Love Away" remixed by DJ Lynwood, Excel Beats and Erik Mota reached the Top 50 Billboard chart.

King's album, Popra Soldier, released in 2014, featured piano player Ruslan Sirota.
