= The Big Payback (book) =

Book by Dan Charnas

The Big Payback: The History of the Business of Hip-Hop
- Author: Dan Charnas
- Subject: Business & Economics, Industries, Entertainment
- Publisher: New American Library
- Publication date: 2011
- Pages: 672
- ISBN: 1101568119

The Big Payback: The History of the Business of Hip-Hop is a book by Dan Charnas chronicling the business history of the hip hop industry.

== Reception ==
The book was generally well-received. The Village Voice described it as "epic." Evelyn McDonnell of the Los Angeles Times named it a "must-read...character-driven narrative" for anyone interested in "the music business or hip-hop." Dan Charnas revealed that his research for The Big Payback included interviewing "over 300 people: record executives, entrepreneurs, artists, managers, producers, DJs, journalists," research which McDonnell praised as "meticulous." She also wrote that the book has a "fine sense of both the macro and the micro," calling out in particular how it highlighted the "intertwining of commerce and art." However, McDonnell also wrote that despite its "ambitious scope," the book was "not always balanced...largely ignoring Atlanta, Houston, Miami, etc." while focusing on hip-hop mostly from an East and West Coast perspective.

Publishers Weekly called the book a "stylish, lavishly detailed love letter to the genre and the industry," and praised it for its "nuanced treatment of the impresarios behind signature sounds."

== Work ==
- Charnas, D. (2011). The Big Payback: The History of the Business of Hip-hop. Penguin.
