= A Song for You (Bizzy Bone album) =

Studio album by Bizzy Bone
- Released: April 22, 2008
- Genre: Midwest rap
- Length: 50:14
- Label: After Platinum, Virgin
- Producer: Mr. Lee, E. Romero, A. Jones

Bizzy Bone chronology
| Ruthless (2008) | A Song for You (2008) | Back with the Thugz (2009) |

Professional ratings
Review scores
| Source | Rating |
|---|---|
| AllMusic | link |
| DJBooth.net | link |
| Rap Central | link |

A Song for You is the twelfth solo studio album by Bizzy Bone. It was released on April 22, 2008, by After Platinum and Virgin Records and distributed by Select-O-Hits. This album features DMX, Chris Notez, Joel Madden, Twista and Jim Jones.

== History ==
In 2006, Bizzy Bone signed a three-album deal with Virgin Records and After Platinum Records. He immediately began recording songs. The single "Money" was released in 2007, with the second single, "A Song For You", following early the next year. Two songs "Back In The High Life", which featured Chris Notez, and "Thug Til I Die" (the original version of "Ballin'" that featured Trae) were not included on the album. After many postponed release dates, the album was released on April 22, 2008. The album entered the Billboard 200 at #148 with first week sales of 4,200.

== Critical reception ==
A Song For You received good reviews from music critics. David Jeffries of AllMusic gave the album 4 out of 5 stars explaining "A Song for You might just be a tad more friendly than his cult would desire, but the idea that Bizzy is his own worst enemy gets tossed out the window after this roaring success. Give him the right time and right place, and Bizzy, surprisingly enough, ends up being the right man for the job." Jeffries also stated "You can argue about how 'eccentric' loose canon Bizzy Bone can be and how it gets in the way of his music, but you can't argue about how his over-prolific release schedule has sadly undermined his better work. The year 2008 had already seen one Bizzy album appear by the time Song for You arrived, but this full-length breaks the pattern, becoming the first end-to-end stunner in the rapper's solo career." Nathan S. of DJBooth.com gave the album 3.5 out of 5 turntables stating "Regardless of A Song For You's sometimes questionable musical choices, Bizzy seems determined to make his music, mainstream radio be damned (literally), and I have to respect him for that. In the end you don't have to be religious to enjoy A Song For You, but it would help. As for me, my idea of the scripture is my original copy of Paid In Full, so take this review accordingly. We all worship in our own ways."

== Track listing ==
| No. | Title | Length |
|---|---|---|
| 1. | "Prelude" (additional vocals by DMX and Chris Notez) | 0:51 |
| 2. | "A Song for You" (featuring DMX and Chris Notez) | 3:58 |
| 3. | "I'm the One" (featuring Joel Madden of Good Charlotte) | 4:14 |
| 4. | "Muddy Waters" (additional vocals by L. Calloway) | 4:08 |
| 5. | "Money" (featuring Twista) | 4:19 |
| 6. | "What Have I Learned" | 3:33 |
| 7. | "Mercy Mary" | 4:01 |
| 8. | "I Truly Believe" (additional vocals by Krys Ivory) | 4:33 |
| 9. | "Ballin'" (featuring Jim Jones) | 3:48 |
| 10. | "I Need You" (additional vocals by Chris Notez) | 3:53 |
| 11. | "Hard Times" (featuring Chris Notez) | 3:46 |
| 12. | "Memories" | 4:17 |
| 13. | "Real" (Freestyle additional vocals by Chris Notez) | 3:24 |
| 14. | "Crossroad Outro" | 1:23 |
