= Sorority Party Massacre =

- DVD released by Anchor Bay Entertainment
- Directed by: Justin Jones; Chris W. Freeman
- Written by: Chris W. Freeman
- Produced by: Justin Jones; Thomas Downey; Anthony Clementi; Chris W. Freeman
- Starring: Ed O'Ross; Eve Mauro; Adrian Kirk; Yvette Yates; Marissa Skell; Alison Mei Lan; Rebecca Grant; Thomas Downey; Casey Fitzgerald
- Cinematography: Steven Parker
- Edited by: Mike Hugo
- Music by: Michael Quinlan
- Production company: Marquis Productions
- Distributed by: Highland Film Group
- Release date: December 1, 2012 (United States)
- Running time: 103 minutes
- Country: United States
- Language: English

Sorority Party Massacre is a 2012 American slasher film written and directed by Chris W. Freeman, co-directed by Justin Jones and starring Eve Mauro and Ed O'Ross.

== Plot ==
Every year, Stella Fawnskin selects seven members of Sigma Phi Pi, a sorority with chapters all over the United States, to compete for the Fawnskin Grant. On her way to Stella's ranch, which is in the isolated resort town of Grizzly Cove, grant contender Holly Fanning is killed at a deserted rest area. The next day, Detective William Watts is informed by Holly's father, Captain Dan Fanning, that he is being suspended from the LAPD due to his repeated use of excessive force. When Dan, who is protective of his daughter, mentions that Holly has not yet checked in with him, Will offers to go to Grizzly Cove to keep an eye on her, in exchange for Dan helping him get back on the force.

Will is ferried to Grizzly Cove by Kreeger, and meets with Sheriff Barney P. Lumpkin, and Deputy Lang. The three go to Stella's ranch, and speak with her, the six other girls (Paige, Brooklyn, Veronica, Jessie Lynn, Kioko, and Sloan) competing for the grant, and Stella's "mongoloid" handyman, Aggo. They all claim to not know where Holly is, so Will does a bit of research, and discovers that sorority girls have been vanishing in and around Grizzly Cove since at least the 1980s, news which shocks Barney, and Lang. Will tries to call Dan, but the police station's line has been sabotaged, leaving the town's only functioning telephones in the possession of Stella, and Mayor Carson. Will, Barney, and Lang travel to Stella's ranch, arriving just as the body of Veronica, who had been murdered with bees, is uncovered. Upon discovering that Stella's phone is dead, Will takes charge, sending Barney to Mayor Carson's house, and Lang to Kreeger, instructing the deputy to have Kreeger ferry her to someone who can get her in touch with Dan.

Barney returns from Carson's house, claiming to have found the mayor's severed head there. He and Will then venture to the dock, where Lang is dead in the water, and the frightened Kreeger is fleeing the scene. The law enforcement duo go back to the ranch, and are unable to stop someone from hanging Stella. Everyone, minus the missing Kioko, gathers in the dining room, but they become separated due to panic caused by the power going out, and Kioko's corpse being found in the refrigerator. During the chaos, Sloan is set on fire, and burns to death.

Elsewhere on Stella's property, Brooklyn stabs Jessie Lynn in the head. Following a bloody trail leading from Jessie Lynn's remains to a hidden chamber, Will finds Brooklyn and Barney tied up. Barney tricks Will into incapacitating himself with a bear trap, and releases and threatens Brooklyn into going after Paige and Aggo. Barney takes Will to the dock, and informs him that he is the one who has been murdering sorority girls over the past several decades, inspired to do so after helping cover up Stella's murder of her rival, who, unbeknownst to Barney and Stella, was the aunt of Brooklyn. Back at the ranch, Paige and Aggo (who is really a con man named Brian) are chased by the axe-wielding Brooklyn, who hates "sorority bitches" and was the one who hanged Stella. Paige fights Brooklyn, and strangles her.

When Barney finishes gloating, Will grabs a speaker and presses it into Barney's chest, causing Barney's pacemaker to malfunction, and seemingly kill him. Will is joined by Paige and Brian, and together they ready Kreeger's boat to take them to aid. Will is content that everything is over, until he notices the bee stings on Paige's arm. Realizing that the detective is on to her, Paige knocks out Aggo, and throws Will overboard while claiming that she only intended to scare Veronica, not kill her. Will manages to knock Paige into the water, and drown her. Later, while using his precincts' washroom, Will is taunted and mocked by an obnoxious rival detective, who he gives a swirly just as Dan walks in.

In a post-credits scene, Barney is shown recovering, and it is announced that "Detective Watts Returns in Bachelorette Party Massacre".

== Cast ==
- Thomas Downey as Detective William Watts
- Ed O'Ross as Sheriff Barney P. Lumpkin
- Marissa Skell as Paige Harrison
- Eve Mauro as Brooklyn
- Yvette Yates as Sloan
- Casey Fitzgerald as Holly Fanning
- Rebecca Grant as Veronica
- Adrian Kirk as Jessie Lynn
- Alison Mei Lan as Kioko
- Keith Compton as Brian "Aggo" Clementi
- Kevin Sorbo as Captain Dan Fanning
- Richard Moll as Kreeger
- Leslie Easterbrook as Stella Fawnskin
- Louis Mandylor as Mayor Bud Carson
- Ron Jeremy as Detective Rico Depinto
- Amanda Barton as Deputy Lang
- Excel Beats as Himself

== Reception ==
While 1nflux Magazine said the direction and writing were patchy and the characters unlikeable despite the decent cast, it admitted that Sorority Party Massacre is "still an acceptable indie put together on an extremely low budget" and warranted a score of 5/10.

A 2/5 was given to the film by Staci Layne Wilson of Dread Central, who wrote, "Sorority Party Massacre is neither a comedic party nor is it a horror-style massacre. But it's not altogether bad. For me, the best thing was discovering a good actor I don't recall having seen before – Keith Compton, whose performance is more nuanced than all the girls put together in a grinder. Some of the death scenes are inventive if, err, poorly executed (the low budget seriously hurts a script as ambitious as this)" and "If you've got nothing better to do, and especially if you're a dude who likes to watch scantily clad scream princesses prancing around, then perhaps Sorority Party Massacre is worth one peek".

Similarly, in a review for Horror News, Dave Gammon concluded that it was "worth a look for fans of slasher fan fare" while giving it a 3/5. The Film Reel's Will Brownridge was highly critical of the picture, writing, "Sorority Party Massacre is little more than scantily clad women, running and screaming, and then dying in the least bloodless way possible. If not for Ed O'Ross as Sheriff Lumpkin, and Thomas Downey as Detective Watts, there would be very little to enjoy. Those two characters manage to be entertaining, and hilarious to watch. Towards the end of the film, the script starts getting filled with so many insane twists, that you'll be left rolling your eyes. The film makes for a great drunken night in, assuming you enjoy yelling at your television with friends, but beyond that, it's better avoided".
