= The Midwest Cowboy =

Studio album by Bizzy Bone
- Released: July 11, 2006
- Recorded: 2005–06
- Studio: Illuminated Studios
- Genre: Hip hop; hardcore hip hop; g-funk
- Length: 56:07
- Label: Real Talk Entertainment
- Producer: Derrick "Sac" Johnson; Playalitical; Pop Sykle

Bizzy Bone chronology
The Story (2006)	The Midwest Cowboy (2006)	Evolution of Elevation (2006)

Professional ratings
Review scores
Source	Rating
AllMusic	3/5 stars

The Midwest Cowboy is the eighth solo studio album by American rapper Bizzy Bone. It was released on July 11, 2006 through Real Talk Entertainment with distribution via Koch Entertainment. Recording sessions took place at Illuminated Studios. Production was handled entirely by Playalitical except for "Thugs Need Love Too", produced with Pop Sykle. It features guest appearances from Playalitical, Spoke-In-Wordz and Young Droop.

It is the third of four albums he had released in the year 2006, as a follow-up to Thugs Revenge and The Story and eventually being followed by Evolution of Elevation. The production on the album is diverse, ranging from g-funk to synth melodies.

== Track listing ==
No.	Title	Writer(s)	Length
1.	"We Come Right Away"	Bryon McCane	1:58
2.	"Around the World"	McCane	4:39
3.	"It's the Light"	McCane	3:35
4.	"Lovey, Dovey"	McCane	4:28
5.	"The Music"	McCane	0:19
6.	"Thugs Need Love Too" (featuring Playalitical)	McCane; Dustin Robbins	4:29
7.	"If the Sky Falls"	McCane; Robbins; Felisha Martinez	4:16
8.	"Wit a $20 Dolla Bill" (featuring Young Droop)	McCane; Devon Bradford	4:49
9.	"Lessons of Life"	McCane	0:55
10.	"I Must Fess Up"	McCane	4:26
11.	"All We Can Be"	McCane; Martinez	4:37
12.	"Doin' It Wrong" (featuring Playalitical)	McCane; Robbins	5:17
13.	"Blown Away" (featuring Spoke-In-Wordz)	McCane; Hector Garcia	3:47
14.	"What Do We Say?"	McCane	3:56
15.	"Come, Go, See, Know"	McCane	4:36
Total length:			56:07

== Personnel ==
- Bryon "Bizzy Bone" McCane II – main performer
- Dustin "Playalitical" Robbins – featured performer (tracks: 6, 7, 12), producer, engineering, mixing, executive producer
- Felisha "Heaven" Martinez – featured performer (tracks: 7, 11)
- Devon "Young Droop" Bradford – featured performer (track 8)
- Hector "Spoke-In Wordz" Garcia – featured performer (track 13), engineering & mixing (track 7)
- Pop Sykle – producer & engineering (track 6)
- Kevin Murray – engineering & mixing (track 3)
- Brian "J Slikk" Mitchell-Sanders – engineering & mixing (track 8)
- Anton Marquez – engineering & mixing (track 9)
- John Cuniberti – mastering
- Derrick A. Johnson – executive producer
- Brian Bonner – art direction, design, photography
- Illuminated Media – design assistant
- Timothy "Beeno" Iinis – A&R

== Charts ==
Chart (2006)	Peak position
US Top R&B/Hip-Hop Albums (Billboard)	41
US Top Rap Albums (Billboard)	22
US Independent Albums (Billboard)	17
