= Brian Whittaker (music producer) =

- Also known as: Excel Beats
- Genres: Hip hop, pop, R&B
- Occupations: Songwriter, record producer
- Years active: 2009–present
- Website: excelbeats.com

Brian Whittaker is an American record producer, songwriter and recording artist. He has worked with numerous artists and musicians, including Bone Thugs-n-Harmony, Lyfe Jennings, Tahj Mowry, Brianna Hildebrand and Dr. Dre.

== Background ==
Whittaker was born in Los Angeles, California and moved with his mother to Michigan when he was three years old. While in elementary school, Whittaker learned how to play the drums and guitar. In 2009, Whittaker produced and co-wrote See Me Shine featuring Lyfe Jennings, the first single of Bone Thugs-n-Harmony's eighth studio album Uni5: The World's Enemy which peaked at #49 on Billboard Hot 100, #30 on Hot R&B/Hip-Hop Songs, and #10 on the US Rap Songs Chart. He was the original creator of the single which was created in 2005. The album peaked at #19 on the New Zealand music chart and at #14 on the Billboard 200 albums chart. In 2013, his remix version of Yulianna’s song, Don't Take Your Love Away peaked at #49 on the Billboard Dance Club Songs Chart. Whittaker composed soundtracks for several American television series and films such as Motives 2, Faster, Keeping up with the Kardashians, Kourtney & Kim Take Miami, Sorority Party Massacre, Love and Hip Hop: Hollywood, and Kourtney and Kim Take New York.

== Composer filmography ==
List of works involving Brian Whittaker
Year	Work	Role
2015	Heir Jordan	TV movie
2015	So You Think You Can Dance	1 episode
2014	Love and Hip Hop: Hollywood	1 episode
2011 - 2014	Shameless	2 episodes
2012	Sorority Party Massacre	Featured film
2012	Freelancers	Featured film
2011	Love Games: Bad Girls Need Love Too	2 episodes
2011	Kourtney and Kim Take New York	1 episode
2010 - 2011	Bad Girls Club	2 episodes
2010	Faster	Featured film
2010	Keeping Up with the Kardashians	2 episodes
2004 - 2010	The Challenge	2 episodes
2009 - 2010	Kourtney & Kim Take Miami	3 episodes
2007	Motives 2	Featured film
