= Speaking in Tongues (Bizzy Bone album) =

Studio album by Bizzy Bone
- Released: September 27, 2005
- Recorded: 2005
- Genre: Hip hop
- Length: 47:05
- Label: SMC Recordings
- Producer: Jarred Weisfeld (exec.); Greg Miller (exec.); Eddie B; Quite Stankable Productions; Studio Rat; Tightanniam Beats

Bizzy Bone chronology
For the Fans Vol. 1 (2005)	Speaking in Tongues (2005)	Only One (For the Fans Vol. 2) (2006)

Professional ratings
Review scores
Source	Rating
AllMusic	3.5/5 stars
Prefix	6/10

Speaking in Tongues is the fifth solo studio album by American rapper Bizzy Bone. It was released on September 27, 2005 via 845 Entertainment/SMC Recordings. The title is in reference to the incident in which Bizzy Bone went on a spiritual rant during an interview on Houston radio station KPFT FM, speaking in tongues.

Production was handled by Eddie B, Quite Stankable Productions, Tightanniam Beats and Studio KRat, with Greg Miller and Jarred Weisfeld serving as executive producer. It features guest appearances from Bambino and Kahnma. The album peaked at number 183 on the Billboard 200, number 59 on the Top R&B/Hip-Hop Albums and number 15 on the Independent Albums in the United States.

== Track listing ==
All tracks are written by Bryon McCane, except tracks 8 and 13 written with Autry Coleman and track 9 written with Ziehwredu Karnga.

No.	Title	Producer(s)	Length
1.	"What U See"	Studio Kat	4:40
2.	"T.T."	Quite Stankable Productions	3:46
3.	"Bald Head Horse Man"	Tightanniam Beats	3:51
4.	"Seeing Things"	Eddie B	4:00
5.	"BB da Thug"	Eddie B	2:10
6.	"Beauty (You Just a Rose)"	Eddie B	4:17
7.	"Carry My Baby"	Eddie B	3:36
8.	"Hold Me Down" (featuring Bambino)	Tightanniam Beats	3:12
9.	"He Told Me" (featuring Kahnma)	Eddie B	3:26
10.	"Represent Da One"	Eddie B	2:13
11.	"Less Fame"	Quite Stankable Productions	3:11
12.	"Shake Ya Stick"	Quite Stankable Productions	4:26
13.	"All Good"	Quite Stankable Productions	4:17
Total length:			47:05

== Charts ==
Chart (2005)	Peak position
US Billboard 200	183
US Top R&B/Hip-Hop Albums (Billboard)	59
US Independent Albums (Billboard)	15
