= Heaven'z Movie =

Studio album by Bizzy Bone
- Released: October 6, 1998
- Recorded: 1997–98
- Studio: Ocean Way (Nashville); Music Grinder (Hollywood); Groove Mine (Nashville); Studio 56 (Los Angeles)
- Genre: Hip hop; horrorcore; gangsta rap; mafioso rap
- Length: 49:07
- Label: Mo Thugs; Ruthless; Relativity; Epic
- Producer: Bizzy Bone; Cat Cody & Jeff Roberson; Erik Nordquist; Johnny "J"; Mafisto; Mike Johnson; Mike Smoov; Nina

Bizzy Bone chronology
Heaven'z Movie (1998)	The Gift (2001)

Heaven'z Movie is the first solo studio album by American rapper Bizzy Bone. It was released on October 6, 1998, via Ruthless/Relativity Records. The recording sessions took place at Ocean Way and at Groove Mine in Nashville, and at Music Grinder and at Studio 56 in Los Angeles. The production was handled by Bizzy Bone himself under his B.B. Gambini alias together with Mike Smoov, Johnny "J", Mafisto, Erik Nordquist, Cat Cody, Nina and Mike Johnson. It features guest appearances from Cat Cody, H.I.T.L.A.H. Capo-Confuscious and Mr. Majesty. The album reached number 3 on the Billboard 200 and number 2 on the Top R&B/Hip-Hop Albums in the United States, selling 130,000 units in its first week. It was certified Gold by the Recording Industry Association of America a month after its release date. The album is dedicated to the memory of Byron "Big B" Carlos McCane.

The songs "Marchin' on Washington", "Roll Call", "Yes Yes Y'all" and "Brain on Drugs" were cut short due to sample clearances not being made on time. Many songs did not make the album in time, leaving Heaven'z Movie incomplete. Songs omitted included the Tupac Shakur tribute "Life Goes On", "Trials & Tribulations", "Walking In Da Cold", "Way 2 Strong" from The PJs: Music from & Inspired by the Hit Television Series, "Relentless", "Retaliation", "Praise The Lord, Pass The Ammunition", "Power", "War Time", "Murder, Murder", "These Are My Family", "Seven", "10 Commandments", "Dying", "Mercenary", "Surrender My Love" and "Confessions".

== Critical reception ==
Professional ratings
Review scores
Source	Rating
AllMusic	3/5 stars
Entertainment Weekly	B−
The New Rolling Stone Album Guide	3/5 stars

Heaven'z Movie received mixed to positive reviews from music critics. Many reviewers criticized the cutting short of four prominent tracks ("Roll Call", "March On Washington", "Yes, Yes Ya'll", "Brain On Drugs") due to sample clearances. Matt Diehl of Entertainment Weekly gave the album a B− rating, stating "Bone Thugs-n-Harmony's youngest member continues their formula of hip-hop harmony, fire-and-brimstone spirituality, and roughneck rhymes on his solo debut. Bizzy Bone also throws in inner-city cautionary tales ("Social Studies") and flirts dangerously with fascism (check out guest H.I.T.L.A.H. Capo — Confucius' handle). Any enlightening messages in Heaven'z Movie are made unintelligible by Bizzy's over-the-speed-limit rapping, which will satisfy Bone Thugs aficionados — but confuse everyone else". AllMusic's Jason Birchmeier wrote: "One of the more troubled members of Bone Thugs-N-Harmony, Bizzy Bone takes the opportunity presented to him by his solo debut to explore much of his personal life. It's a fairly naked album, often confessional and, relative to his work with Bone, very serious. As such, it's an album orientated mostly toward Bone fans curious about the group's respective inner workings".

== Track listing ==
No.	Title	Writer(s)	Producer(s)	Length
1.	"Roll Call"	Bryon McCane; Michelle Foster	Nina; B.B. Gambini; Dave Paisley (co.)	0:52
2.	"Thugz Cry"	McCane; Johnny Jackson	Johnny "J"; B.B. Gambini	3:39
3.	"Marchin' on Washington"	McCane; Harold Durrett	Mafisto; B.B. Gambini	0:58
4.	"Yes Yes Y'all"	McCane; Jackson	Johnny "J"; B.B. Gambini	0:58
5.	"Menensky Mobbin'"	McCane; Michael Bell; Durrett	Mike Smoov; B.B. Gambini; Mafisto (co.)	3:56
6.	"Waitin' for Warfare" (featuring H.I.T.L.A.H. Capo Confuscious)	McCane; Adrian Parlette; Erik Nordquist	Erik Nordquist; B.B. Gambini	5:46
7.	"Mr. Majesty II" (featuring Mr. Majesty)	Cedric Feaster, Jr.; Bell	Mike Smoov; B.B. Gambini	4:21
8.	"Brain on Drugs"	McCane; Mike Johnson; Durrett	Mike Johnson; Mafisto; B.B. Gambini	1:08
9.	"On the Freeway" (featuring Cat Cody)	McCane; Torrance Cody, Jeff Roberson	Cat Cody; B.B. Gambini	4:34
10.	"Demons Surround Me"	McCane; Bell	Mike Smoov; B.B. Gambini	2:49
11.	"(The Roof Is) On Fire"	McCane; Bell	Mike Smoov; B.B. Gambini	3:33
12.	"Nobody Can Stop Me"	McCane; Jackson	Johnny "J"; B.B. Gambini	4:03
13.	"Social Studies"	McCane; Durrett	Mafisto; B.B. Gambini	11:46

Sample credits

- Track 2 contains elements from "My Eyes Adored You" written by Bob Crewe and Kenny Nolan and performed by Frankie Valli, and "When Doves Cry" performed by Prince
- Track 3 contains elements from Ludwig van Beethoven's Piano Sonata No. 14
- Track 6 contains elements from "Sunglasses at Night" written by Corey Hart
- Track 7 contains elements from "My Melody" written by Eric Barrier and William Griffin
- Track 8 contains elements from the Partnership for a Drug-Free America's campaign This Is Your Brain on Drugs.
- Tracks 11 and 13 contain replayed elements from "The Roof Is on Fire" written by Charles Pettiford, Gregory Wigfall, Richard Fowler, C. Evans and Jerry Bloodrock
- Track 12 contains replayed elements from "If Only You Knew" written by Cynthia Biggs, Kenneth Gamble and Dexter Wansel
- Track 13 contains a direct sample of "Gay Spirits" written by David Rose.

== Personnel ==
- Bryon "Bizzy Bone"/"B.B. Gambini" McCane II – main performer (tracks: 1–6, 8–13), producer, mixing assistant (track 1), art direction
- Adrian "H.I.T.L.A.H. Capo-Confuscious" Parlette – featured performer (track 6)
- Cedric "Mr. Majesty" Feaster Jr. – main performer (track 7)
- Torrance "Cat" Cody – additional vocals & producer (track 9)
- Jeff Roberson - co-producer (track 9)
- Ronnie King – keyboards (tracks: 2, 4)
- Michelle Foster – producer (track 1)
- Dave Paisley – co-producer (track 1)
- Johnny "J" Jackson – producer & mixing (tracks: 2, 4, 12), arranger (tracks: 2, 4)
- Harold "Mafisto" Durrett – producer (tracks: 3, 8, 13), co-producer (track 5), mixing (track 13), engineering assistant (track 3)
- Michael "Mike Smoov" Bell – producer (tracks: 5, 7, 10, 11), recording (track 10), mixing (tracks: 5, 10), engineering assistant (track 11)
- Erik "E" Nordquist – producer & mixing (track 6), recording (tracks: 6, 11)
- Mike Johnson – producer (track 8)
- Jupiter Joe – recording (tracks: 1, 7, 9, 10), mixing (tracks: 1, 3, 5–8, 10, 11, 13), engineering assistant (tracks: 2, 4, 12)
- Ian Boxill – recording & mixing (tracks: 2, 4, 12)
- Alvin Williams – recording (track 3)
- Chad Brown – recording (tracks: 5, 8, 13), engineering assistant (tracks: 9, 11)
- Dean Fisher – engineering assistant (tracks: 2, 4, 12)
- Joe Brown – engineering assistant (track 6)
- David Bett – art direction
- Chiu Liu – design
- Randy Ronquillo – design
- Daniel Hastings – cover photo
- United Press International – photography
- Bettmann Corbis – photography
- Agence France-Presse – photography
- Uniphoto – photography

== Charts ==
=== Weekly charts ===
Chart (1998)	Peak position
US Billboard 200	3
US Top R&B/Hip-Hop Albums (Billboard)	2

=== Year-end charts ===
Chart (1998)	Position
US Top R&B/Hip-Hop Albums (Billboard)	92

== Certifications ==
Region	Certification	Certified units/sales
United States (RIAA)	Gold	500,000^{^}
^{^} Shipments figures based on certification alone.
