= Alpha and Omega (Bizzy Bone album) =

Studio album by Bizzy Bone
- Released: September 14, 2004
- Recorded: 2003–04
- Genres: Hip hop; gangsta rap
- Length: 58:58
- Label: Bungalo
- Producers: Anthony M'Shala Moses; Bizzy Bone; Brian Lamb; Danny V. Jones; Darrell L. Johnson; Gary "Geewhiz" Greenberg; Kenny McCloud; Kevin Rowe; Llan (yon); Paul Chase

Bizzy Bone chronology
The Gift (2001)	Alpha and Omega (2004)	The Beginning And The End (2004)

Professional ratings
Review scores
Source	Rating
AllMusic	3.5/5 stars
RapReviews	(5.5/10)

Alpha and Omega is the third solo studio album by American rapper Bizzy Bone. It was released on September 14, 2004, via Bungalo Records with a bonus DVD that showed behind-the-scenes footage of the making of the album. Production was handled by Anthony M'Shala Moses, Darrell L. Johnson, Danny V. Jones, Paul Chase, Brian Lamb, Kevin Rowe, Llan, Kenny McCloud, Gary "Geewhiz" Greenberg, and Bizzy Bone himself. It features guest appearances from Prince Rasu, Big B, the late Adrian "Capo Confuscious" Parlette, King Josiah, Hollis Jae, Kevin Rowe & Llan (yon). The album peaked at number 152 on the Billboard 200, number 27 on the Top R&B/Hip-Hop Albums and number 16 on both Top Rap Albums and Independent Albums charts in the United States. "I Understand" was released as a promotional single with a music video.

== Critical reception ==
Alpha and Omega received generally positive reviews from music critics. AllMusic's David Jeffries gave the album 3.5 out of 5 stars, stating "While his former crew, Bone Thugs-n-Harmony, turned to religion once in a while and mysticism on occasion, Bizzy Bone's solo career has been heavy with prophecy and sky-gazing wonder. It's driven him for a while now, but on Alpha and Omega, it has set him on fire. Lyrically, this is the best Bizzy Bone album, but the subject matter and numerous references to Bizzy's posse, the 7th Sign Regime, are the dividing line -- hard to follow if you're not a fan, rich with insight if you're down. All of the guests on the album are 7th Sign Regime members, and if it weren't for Biggie, 2Pac, and Left Eye getting their shoutouts on "Thug World"—an inspired interpolation of Slick Rick's "Hey Young World"—Alpha and Omega would exist entirely outside the world of mainstream hip-hop. If you even have a passing interest in Bizzy, go right out and pick it up. The urgency of the record is exciting and there's a ton of Bone prose to devour. Is it worth starting here for a newbie? Check fiery numbers like "Capo", "My Niggaz", and the extremely funky "Sit Back Relax", and you'll probably be swayed. That Bizzy doesn't give two flips about current trends and what people think makes him both unique and somewhat unapproachable. Although Alpha and Omega is his strongest album yet, it follows a cryptic rule book and requires a lot of effort for non-7th Sign Regime members".

== Track listing ==
No.	Title	Producer(s)	Length
1.	"No Intro"	Anthony M'Shala Moses	3:40
2.	"Not Afraid"	Anthony M'Shala Moses	4:19
3.	"Died 4 U" (featuring Big B)	B. McCane	4:29
4.	"Murdah" (featuring Prince Rasu, King Josiah, Capo)	Darrell L. Johnson; Danny V. Jones	6:21
5.	"Capo" (featuring Capo)	B. McCane	0:42
6.	"Tha Streets" (featuring Prince Rasu and Capo)	Darrell L. Johnson; Danny V. Jones	4:27
7.	"My Niggaz" (featuring Hollis Jae)	Anthony M'Shala Moses	4:26
8.	"Thug World"	Paul Chase; Brian Lamb	3:47
9.	"I Understand" (featuring Big B)	Anthony M'Shala Moses	5:01
10.	"We Play"	Paul Chase; Brian Lamb	5:04
11.	"All In Together" (featuring Hollis Jae)	Anthony M'Shala Moses; B. McCane	5:00
12.	"Everywhere I Go" (featuring Big B)	B. McCane	4:26
13.	"Sit Back Relax" (featuring Hollis Jae)	Kevin Rowe; Llan (yon)	3:25
14.	"Better Run, Better Hide"	Kenny McCloud; Gary "Geewhiz" Greenberg; Bizzy Bone	3:51
Total length:			58:58

== Charts ==
Chart (2004)	Peak position
US Billboard 200	152
US Top R&B/Hip-Hop Albums (Billboard)	27
US Independent Albums (Billboard)	16
