= The Gift (Bizzy Bone album) =

Studio album by Bizzy Bone
- Released: March 20, 2001
- Recorded: 2000–01
- Genre: Hip hop; gangsta rap
- Length: 59:01
- Label: AMC American Music
- Producer: Darren Vegas; Hoton; Jimmy "JT" Thomas; Tony C

Bizzy Bone chronology
Heaven'z Movie (1998)	The Gift (2001)	Alpha and Omega (2004)

Professional ratings
Review scores
Source	Rating
AllMusic	2.5/5 stars
HipHopDX	3/5
MVRemix Urban	7/10
The New Rolling Stone Album Guide	2/5 stars

The Gift is the second solo studio album by American rapper Bizzy Bone. It was released on March 20, 2001 via AMC American Music. Production was handled by Darren Vegas, Hoton, Jimmy "JT" Thomas and Tony C. The album peaked at number 44 on the Billboard 200, number 19 on the Top R&B/Hip-Hop Albums and number two on Independent Albums, with 36,394 copies sold in the United States in the first week.

The song "Fried Day" initially appeared on the soundtrack of Steve Carr's 2000 film Next Friday, while "Jesus" was featured in Larry Clark's 2001 film Bully.

== Critical reception ==
Though The Gift received mostly positive to mixed reviews from music critics, it is considered by many fans to be Bizzy Bone's best effort. HipHopDX reviewer rated the album 3 out of 5, stating "Overall, The Gift is a pretty well-balanced disk, but as with many presents, a little bit more thought should have been put into it". AllMusic's Jason Birchmeier gave the album 2.5 out of 5 stars, stating "Three years after Bizzy Bone quietly released his largely unheard debut album, Heaven'z Movie, the soon-to-be-ousted Bone Thugs-n-Harmony member followed with a similarly personal and at times confessional album, The Gift. Bizzy's ties to his Bone colleagues had become frayed by this point, and he consequently seems a bit distant and alone here. Bone fans should regardless find Bizzy's perspective interesting, and it's thankfully still easy to appreciate the rapper's versatile style". MVRemix Urban gave "The Gift" a 7 rating out of 10, stating:

The Gift is one of the few Bone albums that offers a variety in topics over a broad spectrum. The albums address social and culture problems, on tracks such as the amazing "Father". On the track Bizzy addresses the problems plaguing our world today. "I see brutality all over niggas killin' niggas. The ghetto got them being born to be killas, Flooded with drugs and trying to get us, so get up. But don't give up, y'all gotta sit up if you last before they kill us". Its soulful approach combined with Bizzy's intelligent lyricism provides a truly memorable experience. "Jesus", "Be Careful" and "Whole Wide World" are similar type tracks that offer more of Bizzy's experiences and personal beliefs. It's tracks like these that make "The Gift" a unique album. Who would have thought Bizzy Bone would drop an album full of depth and insight?

== Track listing ==
Songwriter credits are adapted from ASCAP

No.	Title	Writer(s)	Length
1.	"Schizophrenic"	Bryon McCane; Darren Vegas	4:29
2.	"Don't Be Dumb"	McCane; Vegas	3:51
3.	"Whole Wide World"	McCane; Vegas	3:29
4.	"Never Grow"	McCane; Vegas	4:40
5.	"Murderah"	McCane; Vegas	3:31
6.	"Before I Go"	McCane; Dean Howard Hotop	4:11
7.	"Be Careful"	McCane; Vegas	4:29
8.	"Fried Day"	McCane; James Edward Thomas; Michael Jerome Powell	4:38
9.	"Voices in the Head"	McCane; Amefika Williams	2:20
10.	"Still Thuggish Ruggish"	McCane; Vegas	4:09
11.	"Don't Doubt Me"	McCane; Anthony Eugene Cowan	4:33
12.	"Time Passing Us By"	McCane; Vegas	5:03
13.	"Father"	McCane; Cowan	4:50
14.	"Jesus"	McCane; Hoton	4:48
Total length:			59:01

== Charts ==
Chart (2001)	Peak position
US Billboard 200	44
US Top R&B/Hip-Hop Albums (Billboard)	19
US Independent Albums (Billboard)	2
