= Bizzy Bone =

American rapper (born 1976)

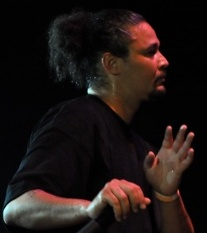
- Bizzy Bone performing in 2009

Background information
- Born: Bryon Anthony McCane II; September 12, 1976 (age 50); Columbus, Ohio, U.S.
- Origin: Cleveland, Ohio, U.S.
- Genre: Hip-hop
- Occupations: Rapper; singer
- Years active: 1992–present
- Labels: Ruthless (1994–2002); Mo Thugs (1996–1998); BTNH Worldwide (2008–present); Virgin (2006–2008); Bungalo; Universal (2003–); Real Talk Ent (2006–present); After Platinum Records (2007–2008); Hi-Power (2008–2009); Warner Bros (2010–2011); Sumerian (2010–2011); 7th Sign (1997–present)
- Member of: Bone Thugs-n-Harmony
- Website: iambizzybone

Bryon Anthony McCane II (born September 12, 1976), better known by his stage name Bizzy Bone, is an American rapper, singer and the youngest member of the Cleveland rap group Bone Thugs-n-Harmony.

== Early life ==
Bryon Anthony McCane II was born in Columbus, Ohio. In 1981, four-year-old McCane and his two sisters were abducted by their mother's ex-husband while their mother was at work and held captive for over two years. McCane recalls that at first, he did not know he had been kidnapped and was made to believe that his mother and grandmother were dead. During the time they were abducted, he and his sisters lived in many homes, apartments, cars, and motels, all in northern Oklahoma. He and his sisters were often beaten, tortured, and sexually assaulted. In 1983, the "family" had been living on the Kaw Indian Reservation in Kaw, Oklahoma, for about a year and a half. A babysitter saw his photo at the end of the made-for-TV film Adam, which dramatized the case surrounding the murder of Adam Walsh, and called the police, resulting in his and his sisters' return to their family.

== Career ==
When he was 13, McCane began living with his oldest sister at her home near Cleveland, Ohio. During this period, he met Layzie Bone, Krayzie Bone, Wish Bone and Flesh-n-Bone. McCane started in hip-hop as a founding member of the group Bone Enterpri$e, which was formed in 1992. The group was noticed by one of the founders of the rap group N.W.A, Eazy-E, who modified the group's name to Bone-Thugs-n-Harmony.

Bizzy Bone began his solo career in 1998, releasing Heaven'z Movie, followed up by The Gift (2001). In 2002, he was dismissed from Bone Thugs-n-Harmony after appearing drunk on stage with them in New York City, but said he had always been a solo artist and was just a guest in the group. That year, McCane appeared on the FOX series America's Most Wanted (hosted by John Walsh, Adam's father) and he revealed his abusive childhood and molestation. McCane also wrote and performed a song, "A.M.W.", on the show in which he thanks Walsh and encourages abused children to come forward.

In 2004, Bizzy released Alpha and Omega which showed a change in his musical and lyrical content. Fans and critics responded positively to the album. Bizzy followed up with the limited-edition leaked album The Beginning and the End. Next, he released Speaking In Tongues in 2005. The title references an incident in which Bizzy Bone went on a spiritual rant during an interview on Houston radio station KPFT-FM (Party 93.3), speaking in tongues. That year, he formed the Bone Brothers with former Bone Thugs-n-Harmony member Layzie Bone, whose first two albums were Bone Brothers (2005) and Bone Brothers 2 (2007). He released four studio albums in 2006. Two of them, The Story and Midwest Cowboy, performed well on the charts, garnering further positive reviews from music critics.

In 2008, Bizzy Bone reunited with Layzie Bone to re-form Bone Brothers and release two new studio albums, Bone Brothers III and Still Creepin' On Ah Come Up (released and credited solely as "Bone Thugs"). That year, Bizzy also released two new solo albums. The first, an independent release Ruthless, features guest appearances from Rick Ross and Pitbull. The other album was his major label release for After Platinum Records distributed through Virgin Records, A Song For You, which featured appearances from DMX, Joel Madden of Good Charlotte, Jim Jones, and Twista. A Song For You was heralded by music critics as Bizzy's best album in years, if not the best of his entire solo career.

In 2010, Bizzy Bone was one of the ensemble of featured artists for the new re-recording of We Are The World 25 for Haiti after the country was devastated, left in ruins by a massive earthquake. The song was critically panned by music critics. The year 2010 would soon see the release of Bizzy Bone's first rap rock album titled Crossroads 2010 on Sumerian Records. The album received positive feedback from fans and critics alike.

On September 12, 2019, Bizzy released his first album in five years, Carbon Monoxide. Its title track is a direct response to the Migos for their disrespect towards Bone Thugs-N-Harmony and other artists from their era, claiming they (Migos), were the "Greatest Group of All-Time." Bizzy's fellow group member Layzie Bone publicly challenged these claims and also released a diss track towards Migos and 21 Savage after the latter came to the defense of Migos, while in the process dissing Layzie Bone. Bizzy reacted apparently intoxicated live on Instagram, threatening to kill Migos and 21 Savage for their disrespect with a double barrel shotgun, which ended abruptly with the police coming to his home in response. Carbon Monoxide debuted at #3 on the iTunes album chart. He released his follow-up album "The Mantra", exactly a year later on his 44th birthday in 2020, debuting at #4 on the iTunes chart. Bizzy released his album "War of Roses" on September 12, 2021, which was on his 45th birthday, making it the third year in a row an album has been released on his birthday.

== Discography ==
- Heaven'z Movie (1998)
- The Gift (2001)
- Alpha and Omega (2004)
- The Beginning and the End (2004)
- Speaking in Tongues (2005)
- Thugs Revenge (2006)
- The Story (2006)
- The Midwest Cowboy (2006)
- Evolution of Elevation (2006)
- Trials and Tribulations (2007)
- Ruthless (2008)
- A Song for You (2008)
- Crossroads: 2010 (2010)
- The Wonder Years (2014)
- Carbon Monoxide (2019)
- The Mantra (2020)
- War of Roses (2021)
- I'm Busy (2022)
- The Waste Lands (2023)
- Bizzy Bone (2024)
- The Book of Bryon (2025)
- Mozaic Art (2026)

== Filmography ==
1. Jacked Up (2000) .... Zach
2. Cutthroat Alley (2003) .... Ghetty
3. Beef III DVD (2006) .... himself
4. What Now (2015) .... B Murda
