= Dan Charnas =

American journalist

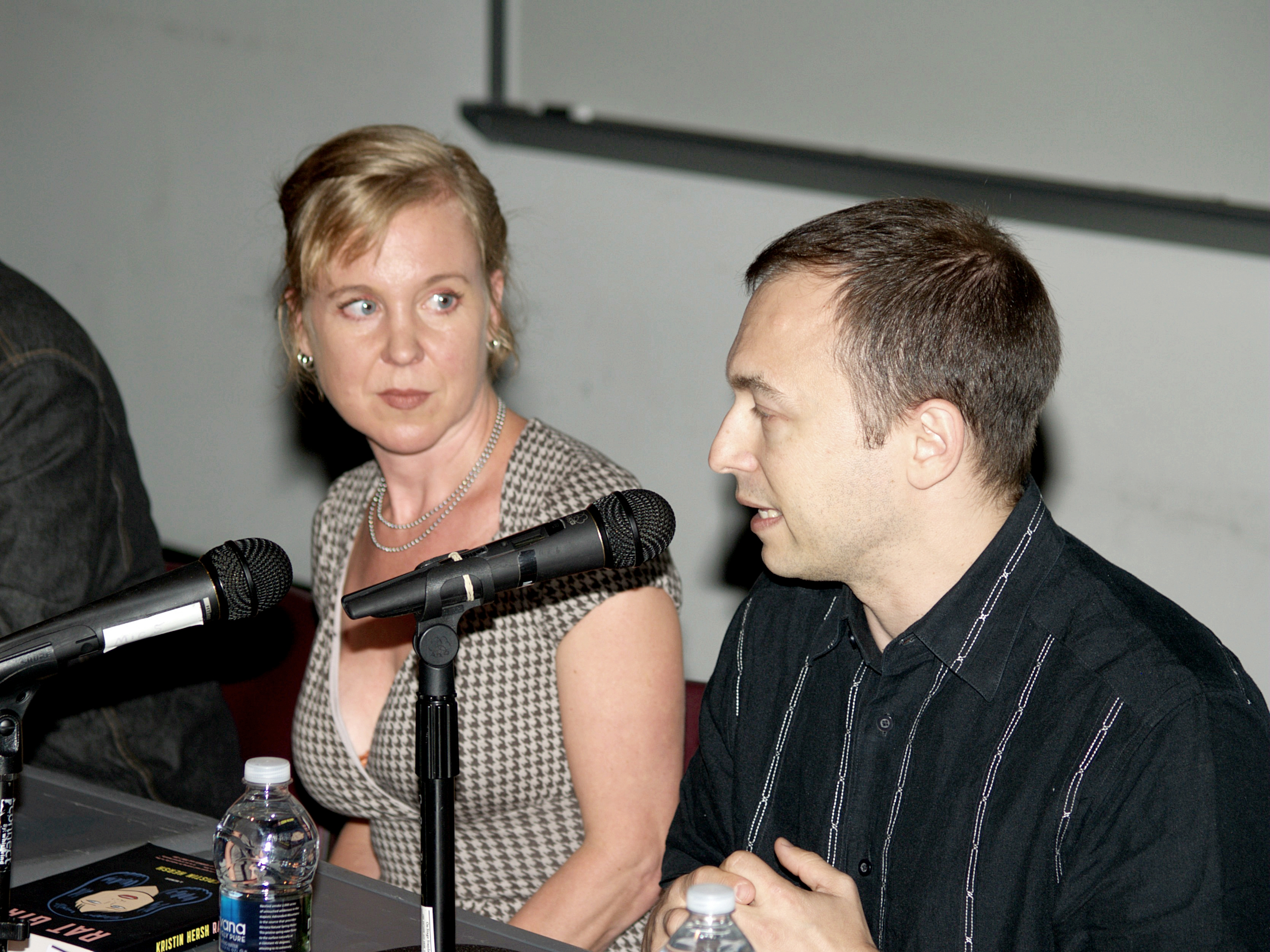
Charnas on a panel at the 2010 Brooklyn Book Festival with Kristin Hersh.

Daniel Louis Charnas (born August 30, 1967) is an American author, radio host and record company executive. He is considered to have played a role in the creation of hip-hop journalism.

A native of New York City, Charnas graduated with honors from Boston University in 1989 with a bachelor's degree in communications. In 2007, Charnas earned a master's degree from the Columbia University Graduate School of Journalism. His master's thesis was titled Shocked: Birthright Unplugged challenges Birthright Israel in an epic battle for the hearts and minds of American Jews.

As a radio personality, Charnas hosted a segment on KPWR in Los Angeles. As a journalist he was a writer for the hip-hop magazine The Source. He became a talent scout for Profile Records and later ran the rap division of American Recordings in a joint venture with Warner Bros. Records.

In 2010 he wrote the book The Big Payback about the history of the hip-hop business.

In 2022 his book Dilla Time, on the life and works of hip-hop producer J Dilla, was published.

Charnas is an associate professor at the Tisch School of the Arts at New York University and has been a thesis advisor at the Columbia University Graduate School of Journalism.

Charnas received the Virgil Thomson Award for Outstanding Music Criticism from the ASCAP Foundation in 2025.
