= Collabs Tape =

Mixtape by Kool Keith
- Released: June 27, 2006
- Recorded: 1991–2006
- Genre: Hip hop
- Length: 2:19:59
- Label: Junkadelic Zikmu
- Producer: Kool Keith (also exec.); DJ Junkaz Lou

Kool Keith chronology
The Lost Masters, Vol. 2 (2005)	Collabs Tape (2006)	In High Definition (2007)

Professional ratings
Review scores
Source	Rating
Allmusic	3.5/5 stars

Collabs Tape is an official mixtape by American rapper and producer Kool Keith. It was released on June 27, 2006 for Junkadelic Zikmu and was produced by Kool Keith and DJ Junkaz Lou. The entire CD consisted of collaborations Keith had done with other artists, including Analog Brothers, Born 2wice, Brainpower, Clayborne Family, Esham, Guru, Princess Superstar, Smut Peddlers, The Cenobites, The Diesel Truckers, The Prodigy, Tim Dog, Viktor Vaughn, and Ol' Dirty Bastard.

== Track listing ==
No.	Title	Length
1.	"Collabs Intro" (featuring DJ Junkaz Lou)	1:11
2.	"Mankind Theme" (featuring Ol' Dirty Bastard)	3:04
3.	"Biology 101" (featuring Sir Menelik)	3:33
4.	"Sugar" (featuring Nancy Des Rose)	3:24
5.	"Return of the B. Girl" (featuring T Love)	3:48
6.	"Freestyle" (featuring Chino XL)	3:11
7.	"Bamboozled (Junkaz Lou Remix)" (featuring Marc Live, Jacky Jasper, Dr. Octopuss & Sinistre)	4:45
8.	"I Ain't Having It" (featuring Tim Dog)	3:13
9.	"Me Showed Up" (featuring Jacky Jasper)	2:19
10.	"Young Ladies" (featuring GuRu, Big Shug & Patra)	3:47
11.	"Voices" (featuring Godfather Don)	2:33
12.	"What's Up Now" (featuring H-Bomb & Marc Live)	3:53
13.	"Doper Skiller" (featuring MF Doom)	2:09
14.	"Exclusive 1"	4:38
15.	"Party Baby" (featuring Roger Troutman)	3:31
16.	"Outtatowniggaz" (featuring Tim Dog & Born 2wice)	3:03
17.	"Untitled"	3:08
18.	"Static" (featuring Sadat X)	2:09
19.	"Destruction Mission" (featuring Earatik Statik & Black Silver)	3:42
20.	"Exclusive 2"	3:06
21.	"Freaks" (featuring El Gant)	4:45
22.	"Diesel Power" (featuring Prodigy)	4:20
23.	"Mental Side Effects" (featuring H & FatHed)	4:05
24.	"Can't Fuck Wit This" (featuring Marc Live)	4:12
25.	"Hands on Experience, Pt. 2" (featuring Bobbito Garcia, The High & Mighty & What? What?)	4:14
26.	"Shake It Baby" (featuring Motion Man)	3:15
27.	"Truck Jewlz" (featuring Black Silver)	2:12
28.	"Kick a Dope Verse (Remix)" (featuring Godfather Don)	3:25
29.	"King of NY" (featuring Dan the Automator)	3:24
30.	"Operation X"	3:10
31.	"Keith n Me" (featuring Princess Superstar)	4:16
32.	"On tha Track" (featuring H-Bomb)	2:26
33.	"Analog Annihilator vs. Silver Surfer" (featuring Ice-T)	3:28
34.	"Stank MC's" (featuring Smut Peddlers)	4:23
35.	"Magnetische Velden" (featuring Brainpower)	3:00
36.	"How We Got It" (featuring Rhymestyle, Black Silver & Mr. Tan)	3:35
37.	"Checkin' tha Doe" (featuring Clayborne Family & Tim Dog)	3:39
38.	"Freestyle" (featuring Ice-T)	1:10
39.	"Supreme Sound" (featuring Nancy Des Rose)	1:23
40.	"Ultra Reunion" (featuring Ced-Gee)	3:25
41.	"You're Late" (featuring Cenobites & Percee P)	3:10
42.	"All Night Everyday" (featuring Esham & Heather Hunter)	4:55
Total length:		2:19:59

== Personnel ==
- Keith Matthew Thornton – main performer, executive producer, producer, photography
- Louis Gomis – performer (track 1), mixing, scratching
- DJ Marrrtin a.k.a. Dirty Dezer – mixing assistant
- Larry Hutch – mastering
- Nator – coordinator
- J. Graphics – artwork & design
- Sean Merrick – performer (tracks: 7, 9, 12, 23, 32, 37)
- Marc Giveand – performer (tracks: 7, 12, 24, 37)
- Timothy Blair – performer (tracks: 8, 16, 37)
- Rodney Chapman – performer (tracks: 11, 28, 41)
- Christopher Rodgers – performer (tracks: 19, 27, 36)
- Nancy Des Rose – performer (tracks: 4, 39)
- Tracy Lauren Marrow – performer (tracks: 33, 38)
- Bobbito Garcia – performer (track 25)
- Cary Guy – performer (track 10)
- Cedric Ulmont Miller – performer (track 40)
- Concetta Kirschner – performer (track 31)
- Daniel Dumile – performer (track 13)
- Derek Barbosa – performer (track 6)
- Derek Murphy – performer (track 18)
- Dorothy Smith – performer (track 10)
- Eric Meltzer – performer (track 25)
- Esham Attica Smith – performer (track 42)
- Gert-Jan Mulder – performer (track 35)
- Heather Keisha Hunter – performer (track 42)
- John Percy Simon – performer (track 41)
- Joshua Adam Gent – performer (track 21)
- Keith Edward Elam – performer (track 10)
- Liam Howlett – performer (track 22)
- Milo Berger – performer (track 25)
- Olan Thompson – performer (track 36)
- Paul Laster – performer (track 26)
- Phillip Collington – performer (track 3)
- Pierre Maddox – performer (track 16)
- Roger Troutman – performer (track 15)
- Russell Tyrone Jones – performer (track 2)
- Taura Taylor-Mendoza – performer (track 5)
- Tsidi Ibrahim – performer (track 25)
- Dr. Octopuss – performer (track 7)
- Earatik Statik – performers (track 19)
- R. Tiano – performer (track 23)
- Rhymestyle – performer (track 36)
- Sinistre – performer (track 7)
- Smut Peddlers – performers (track 34)
