= Slow Your Roll =

"Slow Your Roll" is an expression to instruct someone to reduce the pace or enthusiasm for which they are doing something. It may refer to:

- The motto of the soft drink Drank
- Slow Your Roll (album), by Time Machine (2004)
- "Slow Your Roll", a song from the Barry White album Staying Power (1999)
- "Slow Your Roll", a song from the D12 album D12 World (2004)
- "Slow Your Roll", a song from the Tunnel Rats Tunnel Rats (2004)
- "Slow Your Roll", a song from Tha Dogg Pound album Cali Iz Active (2006)
- "Slow Your Roll", a song from the self-titled album by Bleeding Through (2010)
- "Slow Your Roll", a song from the Dizzee Rascal album Raskit (2017)
- "Slow Your Roll", a song from the Brothers Osborne album Port Saint Joe (2018)
- "Slow Your Roll", an episode from the fourth season of Inside Amy Schumer (2014)

== See also ==
- "Slow Your Role", a song from the Big Mello album Done Deal (2003)
