= The Lost Masters =

The Lost Masters may refer to:

- The Lost Masters (Bucks Fizz album), 2006
- The Lost Masters (Kool Keith album)
  - The Lost Masters, Vol. 2, an album by Kool Keith
- The Lost Masters 1969–1972, a 1997 album by The New Kingston Trio
