= Life Is Expensive =

Studio album by Time Machine
- Released: May 16, 2008
- Studios: The Truth Booth (Los Angeles, California)
- Genre: Hip-hop
- Length: 39:26
- Labels: Glow-in-the-Dark; Miclife
- Producers: Mekalek; Stoerok

Time Machine chronology
| TM Radio (2005) | Life Is Expensive (2008) | Vicious Experiments (2012) |

Life Is Expensive is the second studio album by American hip-hop group Time Machine. It was released by Glow-in-the-Dark Records on May 16, 2008 in the United States, Australia and New Zealand, and by Miclife Recordings in Japan. The album was produced by Mekalek and Stoerok. It features guest appearances from Maya Jupiter, Shawn Jackson, Greg Nice, Cool Calm Pete, Two B. Era, Jahpan, Osandi and Maggie Horn.

== Critical reception ==
Professional ratings
Review scores
| Source | Rating |
|---|---|
| Cokemachineglow | 70% |
| PopMatters | 7/10 |

The album was featured in Billboard's "Your Guide to Unsigned Bands". Katie Hasty stated the album has "more complex lyrical content" compared to the "bouncy jams and old school beats" of their 2004 debut album.

The Source said "By dropping sonic pretense and being sonically adventurous, Time Machine has created of one of the most distinctive rap albums of 2008."

Zoneil Maharaj of XLR8R called the album "a vibrant and bumpin' party album that's also smart and aware". He said it mixes '80s style electropop with golden era hip-hop, and compared the group to Jungle Brothers and early De La Soul.

== Track listing ==
| No. | Title | Producer | Length |
|---|---|---|---|
| 1. | "In The City Of Everything" | Mekalek | 3:56 |
| 2. | "(If You Know) What I Mean" (featuring Maya Jupiter) | Mekalek | 2:48 |
| 3. | "The Groove That Just Won't Stop" | Mekalek | 2:50 |
| 4. | "We're Making A Video" (featuring Shawn Jackson) | Mekalek | 3:26 |
| 5. | "The Unfortunate Twist" (featuring Greg Nice) | Mekalek | 3:48 |
| 6. | "Here Comes That Sound" (featuring Cool Calm Pete and Two B. Era) | Mekalek | 3:26 |
| 7. | "Mountains" | Stoerok | 2:46 |
| 8. | "Life Is Expensive" | Mekalek | 3:59 |
| 9. | "A Little Dirt Of Your Own" (featuring Jahpan) | Mekalek | 3:14 |
| 10. | "Who Cares?" (featuring Osandi) | Stoerok | 3:28 |
| 11. | "Something We're Becoming" (featuring Maggie Horn) | Mekalek | 2:49 |
| 12. | "Survival Kit" | Mekalek | 2:56 |
| Total length: | | | 39:26 |

Japan CD bonus videos
| No. | Title | Length |
|---|---|---|
| 1. | "In The City Of Everything" | 3:19 |
| 2. | "We're Making A Video" | 3:21 |
| 3. | "The Unfortunate Twist" | 3:20 |

Additional vocals

- Cara, Dr. G, Hilton Carter, Jeanie Inna Bottle, SP, Serena and Young Reeses on "We're Making A Video"
- 44, AC The PD, Ameno, Carlos F, Christy Cream, Double K, Emily, Jon Katz, Kado, Katherine, Kristen L, Lady Sha, Mekalek, Mike III, Olde Soul, Rick M, Robin, Roux, Shawn Jackson, Stoerok, Tony M and Two B. Era on "Life Is Expensive"

Other credits

- Recorded and mixed by Mekalek at The Truth Booth in Los Angeles, California
- Mastered by Ricardo Gutierrez at ZoneDigi in Brooklyn, New York
