= Drank =

Drank or purple drank are street names for lean (drug). It may also refer to:

- "Drank", a song by Girlicious from the 2010 album Rebuilt
- "Swimming Pools (Drank)", 2012 song by Kendrick Lamar
- Drank (soft drink), a lean-themed non-narcotic drink

== See also ==
- Drink
- Drunk
