= Time Machine (group) =

American hip hop group

- From left to right: Stoerok, Comel, Jaysonic, Mekalek

Background information
- Origin: Washington D.C., United States
- Genres: Hip-hop, alternative hip-hop
- Years active: 1999–Present
- Labels: Landspeed, Glow-In-The-Dark Records
- Members: Comel; Jaysonic; Mekalek; Stoerok

Time Machine is American hip-hop group composed of rappers Comel and Jaysonic, with producers Mekalek and Stoerok. The group formed in 1999 in Washington, D.C.

== History ==
=== 1993 - 2001: Formation ===
Jaysonic and Mekalek have known each other since 1993, where they attended the same high school in Providence, Rhode Island. Jaysonic went on to attend George Washington University, alongside Stoerok. In 1996, Jaysonic met Comel, who was a student at Brown University.

Active prior to Time Machine, Jaysonic turned Comel on to his body of work, some of which was recorded and produced with Mekalek in Providence. Standing out was a song called "Sneakers" which won Stretch and Bobbito's Battle of the Demos.

In 1999, while sitting in on a bedroom recording session of Jaysonic's album Hot Air, Comel recorded a verse on "Block Troopin" for the project. Produced by Mekalek, it was the group's first recorded song.

Showing promise, Jaysonic decided to hold off on a second solo album and focus on making songs with Comel. On a routine night of block trooping through Washington D.C., Jaysonic presented the idea a being a group to Comel and came up with the name Time Machine. Stoerok was later introduced to Comel and would produce the group's second and third songs, "A Million a One Things to Do" and "Reststop Sweetheart".

=== 2001 - 2004: Vinyl singles ===
With college behind them, Jaysonic would move back home to Providence, where Mekalek also lived, while Stoerok would move back to Boston, and Comel would remain in D.C. Though not living together the group would continue to work on music.

"Reststop Sweetheart" was the group's first 12" single, released on Landspeed Records in 2001. After positive reception of "Reststop Sweetheart", the group would leave Landspeed Records and create their own record label Glow-In-The-Dark Records, headed by Jaysonic and Mekalek. On that label the group released their second and third 12" singles, "Personal Ads" in 2002 and "Night Lights" in 2004. A point of note, "Night Lights" is the only Time Machine song that contains production by Jaysonic.

=== 2004 - 2005: Slow Your Roll ===
Following the singles, all members relocated together to Los Angeles for the release of their debut album Slow Your Roll, which released in 2004. The album included the 12" singles, newly recorded material, and collaborations with Edo G., Romen Rock and Edan. The album received XXL's Chairman's Choice and in 2005, it was a feature album on Triple J.

While in Los Angeles the group would work with the popular hip-hop duo People Under the Stairs, collaborating on stage as their opening touring act and in the studio on a remix of "Tuxedo Rap".

=== 2005 - 2008: "Grime Machine", TM Radio, Life Is Expensive ===
In 2005, they released the 12" single "Grime Machine" and the compilation album TM Radio. The album was a compilation of group members solo, rare and unreleased work. Tracks include collaborations with artists such as The Procussions, Masta Ace, Celph Titled, Ed O.G. and Rashaan Ahmad of Crown City Rockers.

Life Is Expensive is Time Machine's second studio album, released in 2008. While featuring jazz samples similar to Slow Your Roll, it included more electronic based production, samples and dance music tempos. The album was entirely produced by Mekalek and Stoerok, with features from Greg Nice of Nice & Smooth and Cool Calm Pete.

=== 2012 - present: Vicious Experiments, The Test of Time ===
Time Machine released the mixtape Vicious Experiments in 2012. The project features Jaysonic and Comel over popular production, as well as original production from Mekalek and Damu The Fudgemunk. In 2018, the group released their third studio album The Test of Time.

== Musical style ==
A large misconception with Time Machine is that the name actually refers to taking listeners back to another era of hip hop, but this is not the case. The group noted that they have a wide range of musical influences from classic rock, jazz, 1980s dance, soul and R&B they have also been heavily influenced by late 1980s to early 1990s rap an era also known as the Golden Age. The tools used in the group's production such as the ASR-10 and MPC were popular during that era which lends their sound of sample based melodies to bits of nostalgia. Lyrically, they focused on songs with specific themes, often writing songs about "identifiable topics". The group has been compared to acts such as Pharcyde and Ugly Duckling.

== Discography ==
=== Studio albums ===
- Slow Your Roll (2004)
- Life Is Expensive (2008)
- The Test of Time (2018)

=== Compilation albums ===
- TM Radio (2005)

=== Mixtapes ===
- Vicious Experiments (2012)

=== Singles ===
- "Reststop Sweetheart" (2001)
- "Personal Ads" (2002)
- "Night Lights" (2004)
- "On The Moon" (2005)
- "Grime Machine" (2005)
