= Keep My Shit Clean =

Album by Jacky Jasper

Studio album by Jacky Jasper
- Released: March 12, 2002
- Recorded: 2002
- Studio: Green Pale (Toronto, Ontario, Canada); Overture Recording (Detroit, MI); Silent Sounds (Los Angeles, CA)
- Genre: Hip hop
- Length: 55:56
- Label: Number 6 Records
- Producer: Jacky Jasper a.k.a. H-Bomb; Phil Cold; Marc Live

Jacky Jasper chronology
Narcissism (1997)	Keep My Shit Clean (2002)	Game (2002)

Professional ratings
Review scores
Source	Rating
RapReviews	5/10

Keep My Shit Clean (stylized as Keep My Sh*t Clean) is the fifth studio album by American rapper and producer Sean Merrick and his first album under his alias Jacky Jasper. It was released on March 12, 2002 via Number 6 Records and was produced by Phil Cole, H-Bomb and Marc Live. The album featured guest appearances from Kool Keith, Ice-T, Chino XL, Roger Troutman, Dee Bombshell and Trigga tha Gambler. It peaked at number 60 on the Billboard Top R&B/Hip-Hop Albums chart and number 24 on the Independent Albums chart.

== Track listing ==
No.	Title	Length
1.	"Tribute to Sammy"	0:44
2.	"We Showed Up"	3:52
3.	"It's Jacky Jasper Little Bitch" (featuring Ice-T)	3:43
4.	"I Want You" (featuring Kool Keith)	3:03
5.	"You Can't Fuck With This" (featuring Dee Bombshell)	3:51
6.	"So Fly"	3:55
7.	"Game Don't Stop"	3:13
8.	"Westside" (featuring Roger Troutman)	3:29
9.	"I'm Tired" (featuring Chino XL & Trigger Tha Gambler)	3:40
10.	"Sistas Can't Grow Hair"	4:16
11.	"Deliverance"	4:12
12.	"Shining Star"	4:16
13.	"Runnin Them Hoes"	4:29
14.	"Porn Star"	2:42
15.	"Murder Dem"	2:54
16.	"Fuck You" (featuring Kool Keith)	3:37
Total length:		55:56

== Personnel ==
- Sean Merrick – main artist, producer
- Keith Matthew Thornton – featured artist (tracks: 4, 16)
- Tracy Lauren Marrow – featured artist (track 3)
- Derek Keith Barbosa – featured artist (track 9)
- Roger Troutman – featured artist (track 8)
- Dee Bombshell – featured artist (track 5)
- Tawan Smith – featured artist (track 9)
- Phillip Cole – producer
- Marc Giveand – co-producer (tracks: 11, 13, 16)
- Jade Scott Santos – mixing & mastering
- Craig McConnell – mixing

== Charts ==
Chart (2002)	Peak position
US Top R&B/Hip-Hop Albums (Billboard)	60
US Independent Albums (Billboard)	24
