= The Lost Masters (Kool Keith album) =

Compilation album by Kool Keith
- Released: August 26, 2003
- Genre: East Coast hip hop; underground hip hop
- Length: 55:37
- Label: DMAFT Records

Kool Keith chronology
Game (2002)	The Lost Masters (2003)	White Label Mix Series, Vol. 1 (2004)

Professional ratings
Review scores
Source	Rating
AllMusic	2.5/5 stars
The New Rolling Stone Album Guide	2/5 stars

The Lost Masters is the first compilation album by American rapper and producer Kool Keith. It was released on August 26, 2003, via DMAFT Records. A sequel to the album, The Lost Masters, Vol. 2, was released on August 9, 2005.

== Track listing ==
No.	Title	Length
1.	"Tess Shit"	2:21
2.	"Baby Baby"	2:34
3.	"You Can't Go Outside"	3:29
4.	"Robert Perry"	3:19
5.	"Freaks"	4:01
6.	"Girls Want You"	3:56
7.	"New York City"	3:55
8.	"Shit Expands"	4:54
9.	"Cleavage"	3:41
10.	"Girl You Know"	3:18
11.	"Telephone Girlfriend"	3:16
12.	"Everybody Playin' Here"	3:14
13.	"Taking Pictures"	2:47
14.	"Gina Called"	3:08
15.	"Same Sound"	3:14
16.	"Trying to Talk to You"	4:30
Total length:		55:37

== Personnel ==
- Keith Matthew Thornton – main artist
- Jeff May – design & layout
- Carl Caprioglio – photography
