= Roxbury 02119 =

Studio album by Ed O.G. & Da Bulldogs
- Released: June 1993
- Studio: Calliope Studios (New York City); Chaptown Studios (Roxbury, MA); Power Play Studios (Long Island City, NY)
- Genre: Hip hop
- Length: 45:45
- Label: Chemistry Records/Mercury/PolyGram
- Producer: Teddy Ted (exec.); Special K (exec.); Joe Mansfield; Diamond D; Scott Foster; Ed O.G.; Desmond Sharief Powell

Ed O.G. & Da Bulldogs chronology
Life of a Kid in the Ghetto (1991)	Roxbury 02119 (1993)	The Truth Hurts (2000)

Singles from Roxbury 02119
- 1. "Skinny Dip (Got It Goin' On)" Released: 1993; 2. "Love Comes and Goes" Released: 1994

Professional ratings
Review scores
Source	Rating
AllMusic	4/5 stars
RapReviews	6.5/10 stars

Roxbury 02119 is the second studio album by Boston-based rapper Ed O.G. & da Bulldogs. It was released on Chemistry/Mercury/PolyGram Records in June 1993. The album peaked at number 36 on the Top R&B/Hip-Hop Albums chart. The album spawned two singles: "Skinny Dip (Got It Goin' On)", which peaked at number 19 on the Hot Rap Songs, and "Love Comes & Goes", which peaked at number 43 on the Hot Rap Songs.

== Track listing ==
No.	Title	Writer(s)	Producer(s)	Length
1.	"Streets of the Ghetto"	E. Anderson; J. Kirkland; L. McCann	Diamond D	3:22
2.	"Busted"	E. Anderson; J. Kirkland	Diamond D	4:32
3.	"Love Comes and Goes"	E. Anderson; J. Kirkland; E. Simms; J. Moss; O. Redding; A. Walden	Diamond D	4:24
4.	"Skinny Dip (Got It Goin' On)"	E. Anderson; J. Mansfield	Joe Mansfield; Ed O.G.; Smitt Dog	3:47
5.	"I Thought Ya Knew"	E. Anderson; J. Kirkland; E. Harris	Diamond D	4:26
6.	"I'm Laughin'"	E. Anderson; J. Mansfield	Joe Mansfield	4:11
7.	"I'll Rip You"	E. Anderson; S. Foster	Scott Foster	3:21
8.	"Go Up and Up"	E. Anderson; J. Mansfield	Joe Mansfield	3:19
9.	"Try Me"	E. Anderson; D. Powell	Desmond Sharief Powell	5:04
10.	"Dat Ain't Right"	E. Anderson; J. Kirkland	Diamond D	3:31
11.	"Less Than Zero"	E. Anderson; J. Mansfield	Joe Mansfield	3:18
12.	"Check It Out"	E. Anderson; J. Mansfield	Joe Mansfield	2:31
Total length:				45:45

== Personnel ==
- Edward Anderson – main artist, vocals, producer (track 4), mixing (tracks: 4, 8)
- Gee Man – main artist, backing vocals
- T-Nyne – main artist, backing vocals
- DJ Cruz – main artist, scratches
- Dinitry A. Behrmann – additional vocals (track 5)
- Eric Jupiter – additional vocals (track 9)
- Larry Green Jr. – additional vocals (track 9)
- Shane "The Doctor" Faber – guitars & keyboards (track 3)
- Joseph Kirkland – producer (tracks: 1–3, 5, 10), mixing (tracks: 1–2, 5, 10)
- Joe Mansfield – producer (tracks: 4, 6, 8, 11–12)
- Desmond Sharief Powell – producer & mixing (track 9)
- Scott Foster – producer (track 7)
- Smitt Dog – producer (track 4)
- Teddy Whiting – executive producer, mixing (tracks: 6–8)
- Kevin Keaton – executive producer
- Gregory Mann – mixing (tracks: 1–2, 5, 10)
- Richard Keller – mixing (tracks: 1–2, 9)
- Kevin Reynolds – mixing (tracks: 3, 10–12)
- Leo E. Okeke – mixing (track 4), recording
- Ivan "DJ Doc" Rodriguez – mixing (tracks: 6–8), recording
- Chris "The Wolf" Julian – recording
- Tony Dawsey – mastering
- David Brubaker – design
- Peter Bodtke – photography
