= Spankmaster =

Studio album by Kool Keith
- Released: June 5, 2001
- Recorded: 2000–01
- Studio: Overture Recording (Michigan)
- Genre: Hip-hop
- Length: 61:15
- Label: Overcore/Gothom; TVT
- Producer: Kool Keith; Esham; Jacky Jasper; Marc Live; Santos

Kool Keith chronology
Matthew (2000)	Spankmaster (2001)	Game (2002)

Spankmaster is the sixth solo studio album by American rapper and producer Kool Keith. It was released on June 5, 2001, through Overcore/Gothom with distribution via TVT Records. Recording sessions took place at Overture Recording in Michigan. Production was handled by Santos, Jacky Jasper, Esham, Marc Live, and Kool Keith himself, who also served as executive producer. It features guest appearances from Jacky Jasper, Esham, Brittany Hurd, Heather Hunter, Laura Ruby and Mary Santos.

The album did not reach the Billboard 200, however, it peaked at number 48 on the Top R&B/Hip-Hop Albums, number 11 on the Independent Albums and number 16 on the Heatseekers Albums charts in the United States.

== Critical reception ==
Professional ratings
Review scores
Source	Rating
AllMusic	3/5 stars
Robert Christgau	(choice cut)
HipHopDX	3.5/5
RapReviews	3/10
(The New) Rolling Stone Album Guide	3.5/5 stars
Vibe	2/5

Spankmaster was met with mixed or negative reviews from music critics. Jeff Ryce of HipHopDX wrote: "the sound of this album lies somewhere in between Lost In Space and Matthew, the beats usually consist of heavy synthesizers to create a slow spaced out sound", he added, "while the production can get a little mundane and repetitive it doesn't faze the listener too much because his lyrics demand so much attention". AllMusic's Jason Birchmeier found that the album "heads even further toward insanity than his preceding trilogy of albums for Funky Ass foreshadowed", referring to Keith's albums Sex Style, First Come, First Served and Matthew, and concluded: "recommended to the open-minded, particularly if you admire creativity, long for the uncanny, and secretly have a desire for perversity. Definitely not for the lighthearted".

Steve 'Flash' Juon of RapReviews wrote: "his last album Matthew was full of self-produced beats and meandering stream-of-consciousness thoughts that had little to do with what could honestly be called rapping – and the sad fact is that this album picks right up where Matthew left off". Critic Robert Christgau picked "Dark Vadar" song as a "choice cut", indicating a good song on "an album that isn't worth your time or money".

== Track listing ==
No.	Title	Writer(s)	Producer(s)	Length
1.	"Concert Intro"	Keith Matthew Thornton; Sean Merrick; Scott Santos	Kool Keith; Jacky Jasper; Santos	0:49
2.	"I Wanna Play" (featuring Brittany Hurd and Heather Hunter)	Thornton; Merrick; Esham A. Smith; Santos	Kool Keith; Jacky Jasper; Esham; Santos	3:24
3.	"I'm a Tell-U"	Thornton	Kool Keith	2:59
4.	"Mack Trucks"	Thornton	Kool Keith	2:29
5.	"Drugs"	Thornton; Smith; Santos	Kool Keith; Jacky Jasper; Esham; Santos	3:23
6.	"Yes Yes Y'all" (featuring Esham and Jacky Jasper)	Thornton; Smith; Santos	Kool Keith	3:07
7.	"Haters"	Thornton	Kool Keith	3:21
8.	"N.B.A." (featuring Jacky Jasper)	Thornton; Santos	Kool Keith; Santos	2:41
9.	"Jewelry Shine" (featuring Laura Ruby, Mary Santos and Jacky Jasper)	Thornton; Santos	Kool Keith; Santos	3:32
10.	"Eldaradoe's"	Thornton	Kool Keith	2:23
11.	"Maxin in the Shade"	Thornton	Kool Keith	3:11
12.	"Big Frank"	Thornton; Marc Giveand	Kool Keith; L.Seven	3:11
13.	"Jealous"	Thornton; Giveand	Kool Keith; L.Seven	3:49
14.	"Girls Would U Fuck Tonight"	Thornton; Giveand	Kool Keith; L.Seven	2:58
15.	"Stoney Jackson"	Thornton	Kool Keith; Jacky Jasper; Santos	2:47
16.	"Girls in Jail" (featuring Jacky Jasper)	Thornton; Santos	Kool Keith; Jacky Jasper; Santos	2:49
17.	"Blackula" (featuring Jacky Jasper)	Thornton; Merrick; Smith; Santos	Kool Keith; Jacky Jasper; Esham; Santos	3:02
18.	"Dark Vadar"	Thornton; Smith	Kool Keith; Jacky Jasper; Esham; Santos	4:03
19.	"Captain Save 'Em"	Thornton	Kool Keith	3:45
20.	"Spank-Master (Take Off Your Clothes)" (featuring Esham and Jacky Jasper)	Thornton; Smith; Santos	Kool Keith; Jacky Jasper; Esham; Santos	2:32
Total length:				1:00:15

== Personnel ==
- "Kool" Keith Thornton – vocals, producer, executive producer
- Brittany Hurd – vocals (track 2)
- Heather Hunter – vocals (track 2)
- Sean "Jacky Jasper" Merrick – vocals (tracks: 6, 8, 9, 16, 17, 20), producer (tracks: 1, 2, 5, 15–18, 20)
- Esham Smith – vocals (tracks: 6, 20), producer (tracks: 2, 5, 17, 18, 20)
- Laura Ruby – vocals (track 9)
- Mary Santos – vocals (track 9)
- Scott Santos – guitar (track 18), producer (tracks: 1, 2, 5, 8, 9, 15–18, 20), recording & mixing (tracks: 1, 2, 5, 6, 8, 9, 15–18, 20), mastering, design, photography
- Marc Giveand – producer (tracks: 12–14)

== Charts ==
Chart (2001)	Peak position
US Top R&B/Hip-Hop Albums (Billboard)	48
US Independent Albums (Billboard)	11
US Heatseekers Albums (Billboard)	16
