= Life of a Kid in the Ghetto =

Studio album by Ed O.G. & da Bulldogs
- Released: March 5, 1991
- Recorded: 1990–1991
- Studio: Power Play (Long Island, New York)
- Genre: Hip hop
- Length: 44:22
- Label: PWL America; Mercury; PolyGram
- Producer: Teddy Ted; Special K; Joe Mansfield

Ed O.G. & da Bulldogs chronology
Life of a Kid in the Ghetto (1991)	Roxbury 02119 (1993)

Singles from Life of a Kid in the Ghetto
- 1. "Bug-a-Boo" Released: 1991; 2. "I Got to Have It" Released: 1991; 3. "Be a Father to Your Child" Released: 1992

Life of a Kid in the Ghetto is the debut studio album by the Boston-based rap group Ed O.G. & da Bulldogs. It was released on March 5, 1991, via PWL America/Mercury Records/PolyGram. The album peaked at number 166 on the Billboard 200 and number 21 on the Top R&B/Hip-Hop Albums chart. The album spawned three singles: "Bug-a-Boo" (which peaked at No. 25 on Hot Rap Songs), "I Got to Have It" (which peaked at No. 83 on Hot R&B/Hip-Hop Songs and No. 1 on Hot Rap Songs), and "Be a Father to Your Child" (which peaked at No. 58 on Hot R&B/Hip-Hop Songs and No. 5 on Hot Rap Songs). Life of a Kid in the Ghetto has sold more than 500,000 copies.

== Critical reception ==
Professional ratings
Review scores
Source	Rating
AllMusic	4/5 stars
RapReviews	7.5/10

The Plain Dealer labeled the album "a unique blend of politics and party rhymes". The Washington Post concluded that "articulate rapper Ed O. G and noted producers Special K and Teddy Tedd (a k a the Awesome Two) create a masterpiece, using tales from the inner city and smoothly soulful and jazzy rhythm sample arrangements as their canvas."

== Track listing ==
No.	Title	Length
1.	"I'm Different"	4:15
2.	"Speak Upon It" (featuring Def Jef and Ace & Quan)	5:00
3.	"Feel Like a Nut"	3:29
4.	"I Got to Have It"	3:24
5.	"She Said it Was Great"	3:42
6.	"Dedicated to the Right Wingers"	3:25
7.	"Gotta Have Money (If You Ain't Got Money, You Ain't Got Jack)"	4:08
8.	"Let Me Tickle Your Fancy" (featuring Pure Blend)	3:38
9.	"Be a Father to Your Child"	3:45
10.	"Stop (Think for a Moment)"	2:59
11.	"Bug-a-Boo"	3:13
12.	"Life of a Kid in the Ghetto"	3:24
Total length:		44:22
