= Jacky Jasper =

Canadian-American rapper, Hollywood producer and celebrity blogger

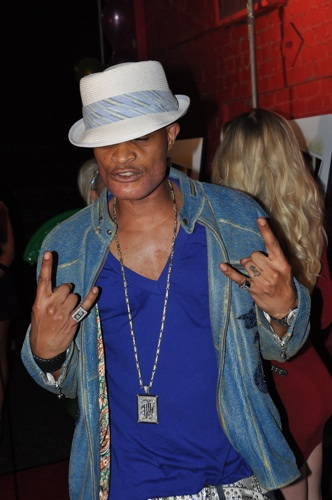

Background information
- Also known as: H-Bomb; HDV
- Born: Sean Merrick; Toronto, Ontario, Canada
- Origin: Hollywood, California
- Genre: G-Funk
- Years active: 1990–2000s
- Label: Sony Records

Sean Merrick, also known by the monikers HDV, H-Bomb, Jacky Jasper and Hollywood Street King, is a rapper and former celebrity blogger. Merrick's catalogue of artistic works showcases features from artists including Ike Turner, Rick James, Roger Troutman, Bootsy Collins, Ohio Players and The Brides of Funkenstien.

== Music career ==
In 1991, as the artist formerly known as Toronto rapper HDV, the "Pimp of the Microphone" emcee made a historical contribution to the revolutionary Can't Repress The Cause Movement.

In 1993—three years before the 1996 release of Tupac's Jesus-inspired Makaveli album cover captioned, "In no way is this portrait an expression of disrespect for Jesus Christ,"—Jacky Jasper marked the release of his album debut as HDV—an acronym for 'Higher Deeper Values' -- with a socially-charged, Jesus-inspired key art album cover that depicted him nailed to the cross above a shocking pictorial of references to the KKK holding up a sign that read "N***ers DIE", alongside a sketched-portrayal of an angry nationalist-feminist-type caricature holding up a sign that read "chauvinist pig!". The fearless visual art statement was the cover that packaged the raw "pimp of the microphone' street-prose of lyrical content presented in rhyme that solidified the artist formerly known as HDV's pioneering role as the first Toronto rapper to openly address the systematic effects of political colonization, racial discrimination and economic oppression -- that he witnessed in Canada, and thereby introduced to the Canadian media and socially conscious Toronto hip hop movement. However, despite the raw and innovative artistic expression contributed to Canadian music, the artist formerly known as HDV was promptly blacklisted in Canada and quietly censored off music store shelves (including Sam The Record Man).

In 1994, Higher Deeper Values, the album, was released through ISBA Records/Sony Records. Recorded at Toronto's Wellesley Sound Studios, album features the productions of Toronto-based music producer Phil Cold and Toronto rappers K-4ce, 10K and Kevin "Ice" White.

In 1996, after being recruited by Eric B to serve as a valuable contributor to the American rap music movement, the censorship of HDV would turn to a situation best described as being a case of that which Canada shunned, American rap innovators recognized and welcomed.

In 1997, H was invited to record his next album in America. The NYC-LA bi-coastal studio production led to the artistic reinvention of HDV to H-Bomb dropping the 1998 studio album titled Narcissism -- a 15 track album featuring Ice T, Coolio, Kool Keith and Domino. The title track of the Narcissism album "Playaz Need No Love," featuring Roger Troutman, charted on Billboard's Hot Rap Tracks for 1999 and peaked at number 33.

In 1998, H Bomb and Roger Troutman co-starred in the Las Vegas film production of "Playaz Need No Love," the official music video.

In 1999, H Bomb introduced the new moniker 'Jacky Jasper' when he teamed up with Kool Keith for the album First Come First Served. The track titled 'Call the Cops' off the First Come First Served album, which featured Jacky Jasper as an uncredited vocalist, was later listed in the movie soundtrack for the 2006 film titled Grandma's Boy.

In March 2002, the artist known as Jacky Jasper dropped the "Keep My Shit Clean" album. Co-produced by Sean Merrick and Toronto music producer Phil Cold, the 16-track studio album includes special homage to Roger Troutman; features Chino XL, Esham and Trigger Tha Gambler; and the return features of Ice T, and Kool Keith. Keep My Shit Clean peaked at number 60 on the Billboard Top R&B/Hip-Hop Albums chart and number 24 on the Independent Albums chart.

In November 2002, the release of the studio album titled Game presented Jacky Jasper as H-Bomb in the debut of the supergroup KHM, the initials for Kool Keith, H-Bomb and Marc Live,

In 2005, production of the Jacky Jasper and Kool Keith joint album-project titled "7th Veil - Stoned" was underway. With Chilly Chill in the production seat, and Phil Cold as a credited producer on the project, the "7th Veil - Stoned" album was recorded at the legendary Hollywood "flower shop" recording studio. Released in 2009, the "7th Veil - Stoned" album features Ike Turner, Rick James, Snoop Dogg, Kurupt, Sillk the Shocker, Jewell, Ice T, Flavor Flav, Roscoe, Coco and Bombshell.

== Blogging career ==
In 2009, the launch of with the artist known as Jacky Jasper as the face of news site Diary of a Hollywood Street King under his pseudonym Jacky Jasper. Merrick would also become the main contributor to the site. The site was the first to publish Charlie Sheen's HIV status in April 2014.

== In the Media ==
On June 15, 2012, Jacky Jasper appeared on Dateline NBC for the featured investigation into 1990's rapper Timothy Blair, aka Tim Dog. The two-part documentary-stye series titled "The Perfect Catch," credited the Diary of a Hollywood Street King blog platform for serving as a noted "message board" that connected a set of alleged online dating scam victims of Tim Dog.

August 2016, mainstream news outlets reported Jacky Jasper had been impersonated by a noted celebrity stalker in order to "get close" to the Kardashian family matriarch, Kris Jenner.

== Discography ==
Studio albums
| Year | Title | Peak chart positions | | | Notes |
| Year | Title | Top R&B/Hip-Hop Albums | Independent Albums | Heatseekers Albums | Notes |
|---|---|---|---|---|---|
| 1990 | Sex, Drugs + Violence: Label: ISBA Records | — | — | — | Credited as HDV |
| 1993 | Higher Deeper Values: Label: ISBA Records | — | — | — | Credited as HDV |
| 1996 | In Yo' Face: Label: Spoiled Brat Entertainment | — | — | — | Credited as H-Bomb |
| 1997 | Narcissism: Label: Insomnia Records | — | — | — | Credited as H-Bomb |
| 2002 | Keep My Shit Clean: Label: Number 6 Records | 60 | 24 | — | Credited as Jacky Jasper |
| 2002 | Game: Label: Number 6 Records | 42 | 33 | 26 | Recorded with Kool Keith and Marc Live; Credited as H-Bomb |
| 2004 | Jacky Who?: Label: Junkadelic Music | — | — | — | Recorded as Jacky Jasper |
| 2004 | Clayborne Family: Label: Threshold Recordings | — | — | — | Recorded with Kool Keith and Marc Live; Credited as Jacky Jasper |
| 2008 | Stoned: Label: L.A. Hill Records | — | — | — | Recorded with Rick James, Kool Keith and Chilly Chill; Credited as H-Bomb |

Singles

| Year | Song | Peak chart positions | Album |
| Year | Song | Hot Rap Songs | Album |
|---|---|---|---|
| 1990 | "Pimp Of The Microphone" | — | Sex, Drugs + Violence |
| 1990 | "Secret" | — | Sex, Drugs + Violence |
| 1992 | "Sex Drugs + Violence" | — | Sex, Drugs + Violence |
| 1993 | "Sindy" | — | Higher Deeper Values |
| 1999 | "Playaz Need No Love" (featuring Roger Troutman) | 33 | Narcissism |
| 2005 | "Whats Up Now" (featuring Kool Keith & Chilly Chill) | — | Collabs Tape |

Guest appearances

| Title | Year | Other artist(s) | Album |
|---|---|---|---|
| "Neighbors Next Door" | 1999 | Kool Keith | First Come, First Served |
| "Call the Cops" | 1999 | Kool Keith | First Come, First Served |
| "War" | 2000 | Analog Brothers, DJ Cisco | Pimp to Eat |
| "We Sleep Days" | 2000 | Analog Brothers | Pimp to Eat |
| "Blackula" | 2001 | Kool Keith | Spankmaster |
| "Mental Side Effects" | 2004 | Kool Keith, KutMasta Kurt, FatHed | Diesel Truckers and Collabs Tape |
| "Bamboozled" | 2004 | Kool Keith, KutMasta Kurt, Marc Live | Diesel Truckers and Collabs Tape |
