= Pimp to Eat =

2000 studio album by the Analog Brothers

Studio album by Analog Brothers
- Released: August 15, 2000
- Genres: Experimental hip-hop; abstract hip-hop
- Length: 60:26
- Label: Ground Control
- Producer: Analog Brothers

Kool Keith chronology
Matthew (2000)	Pimp to Eat (2000)	Masters of Illusion (2000)

Ice-T chronology
The Seventh Deadly Sin (1999)	Pimp to Eat (2000)	Gangsta Rap (2006)

Singles from Pimp to Eat
- 1. "2005" Released: 2000

Alternate cover
- 2016 re-release album cover

Pimp to Eat is the only studio album by American hip-hop supergroup Analog Brothers, which consists of Ice-T as Ice Oscillator, Kool Keith as Keith Korg, Pimp Rex as Rex Roland, Marc Live as Marc Moog, and Black Silver as Silver Synth. It was released on August 15, 2000, via Ground Control Records, and re-released on June 10, 2016, via Mello Music Group. The 16-track record featured guest appearances from Odd Oberheim, H-Bomb, Teflon, Rhymes Syndicate, Synth-A-Size Sisters, and DJ Cisco.

== Background ==
Ice-T and Kool Keith's careers date back to the 1980s, where the latter rose to prominence after his debut studio album Rhyme Pays (1987) along with movie soundtrack hits including "Colors" (1988) and "New Jack Hustler" (1991). Keith was known as a member of the Ultramagnetic MCs before receiving acclaim for his solo albums. Both developed a connection when Keith was in the Ultramagnetic MCs.

The Analog Brothers consisted of Ice-T (as Ice Oscillaor), Kool Keith (as Keith Korg), Pimp Rex (as Rex Roland), Marc Live (as Mark Moog), and Black Silver (as Silver Synth). On July 25, 2000, a few weeks prior to the release of Pimp to Eat, Keith released his solo studio album Matthew.

== Production ==
Pimp Rex had been friends with Ice-T since recording on the latter's "I'm Your Pusher" (1988), and both later developed a connection with Keith, Marc Live, and Black Silver. The Analog Brothers was a concept thought of by Rex for five years, who had known Ice-T before the film Breakin' (1984). He wanted to create the Analog Brothers as a homage to the analog era with analog instrumentals including synthesizers and 808 drum machines. The group members' names were inspired by Rex's ownership of Prophets, Moogs, Korgs, and Rolands, matching the analog names' contrast with the digital production of Pimp to Eat.

According to Josh Kun of CMJ, Pimp to Eat was reportedly produced in less than two weeks, which took place in Ice-T's home studio. During an interview with Thrasher, Ice-T described Keith as setting the creative tone for the project, particularly his style based on his alter ego Dr. Octagon. For the recording process, Pimp to Eat was informal and highly collaborative, with tracks often prepared before Ice-T arrived at the studio, and him being told whether to open a song, contribute a sixteen-bar verse, or not appear on a particular track.

According to the album's credits, Keith provided bass and strings, Ice-T and Rex provided keyboards and drums, Marc Live provided violins and drums, and Black Silver provided synthesizers and lazar bells. Pimp to Eat was mixed by Kutmaster Kurt and mastered by Gene Grimaldi, and features guest appearances from Odd Oberhiem, Jacky Jasper, Sheldon Harris, Rhyme Syndicate, DJ Cisco, and the Synth-A-Size Sisters.

The Analog Brothers revealed on CMJ that the album represents a dissatisfaction with major label productions, prioritizing their artistic vision. The album artwork for Pimp to Eat depicts the Analog Brothers stealing food in a supermarket. During an interview with MTV News, Ice-T considered the album to be as "abstract" as Keith's 1996 solo album Dr. Octagonecologyst (under Dr. Octagon) and stated that the group's album was unconventional for hip-hop.

== Music and lyrics ==
=== Overview ===
Pimp to Eat is an experimental hip-hop and abstract hip-hop album that emphasizes "eerie synthesizer chords". The album's "bleepy, gloopy" production was done by Kutmaster Kurt. Pimp to Eat incorporates the concept of a "scintillatingly scientific five-man crew and a grandiose production" that Christopher R. Weingarten of Ink 19 described as "science-funk". Following a pimp theme, The Big Takeover's Chuck Foster compared the album's production to the styles of record producers Arabian Prince, Egyptian Lover, and RZA.

Keith's lyrics and themes on Pimp to Eat continue elements of his previous works such as Sex Style (1997) and Black Elvis/Lost in Space (1999), which include "robots, aliens, cybernetic sex, the music industry and general weirdness." On various tracks, he informs about an upcoming 32-date tour with James Brown and Madonna, narrates his trip to Wendy's with Darth Vader and R2-D2, brags about having an Earth, Wind & Fire 8-track he has in his Buick Electra 225, and packs "sandwiches for a romantic evening at the Grand Canyon." For Ice-T, his contribution on the album is distinct, with a pitch-shifted voice, and his lyrical style shifts from inner-city street reality to otherworldly subjects.

The album emphasizes absurd themes with the use of "space-age rhymes" and avant-garde flows, featuring various topics including "negative utopias, musical warfare, and sexual mischief". Weingarden described its elements of "buzzing keyboard sweeps" and digital swoops" as similar to Black Elvis/Lost in Space. Keith and Ice-T are prominent on the first half of Pimp to Eat, while they are less involved on the other half.

=== Tracks ===
"Analog Technics" revolves about Keith's absurd humor, where he raps about throwing feces at celebrities at the Billboard Awards, sporting Superman underoos, and driving a lime green Corvette. The following track, "More Freaks", details Keith snorting eight grams of cocaine in Calvin Klein boxer shorts while watching Wide World of Sports, while Ice-T raps about a partnership with Motorola, eating Grand Slams, and asking anyone to meet him at the back of Denny's.

"Analog Annihilator vs. Silver Synth" shares a sound similar to Dr. Octagon's style. "2005" is a battle rap track that fuses Star Wars-esque themes with "observations about street pimping over a club-worthy bassline." "Perms, Baldheads, Afros & Dreds" is described by AllMusic writer Matt Kantor as a "futuristic players ball." "Country Girl", in particular, stands out for its depiction of women based on "beings of love and beauty" rather than "mere sex objects."

== Release ==
In promotion of Pimp to Eat, the group released "2005" as its lead single. Pimp to Eat was initially set to be released on July 4, 2000, but was delayed to August 15, as its master recordings for Kool Keith's vocals were stolen during the melee in Los Angeles after the Lakers' NBA "championship-clinching game". Most of the unrest took place around the Staples Center, attacking police cars and TV vans.

The tapes were housed at a location near the arena, which was where random looting and vandalism took place during the incident. The Analog Brothers' record labels Ground Control and Nu Gruv Alliance issued a statement that they were unclear whether the theft was intentional piracy. Pimp to Eat was eventually released on August 15 without any issues.

=== 2016 re-release ===
In April 2016, Mello Music Group announced the re-release of Pimp to Eat with digital re-mastering, setting its release date to June 10. Keith stated that he was excited about the album's release, seeing it as "a new beginning" and considering it to be "timeless".

Keith stated in a Thrasher interview that "a lot of people missed it", wanting to make it more accessible compared to its initial release. When asked whether he would reunite with the Analog Brothers, Keith remained unsure but was open to the possibility.

On April 28, the Analog Brothers released a music video for "Country Girl", which was directed and edited by Keith and Rex. On June 10, Pimp to Eat was released through digital download, vinyl, and CD. On July 12, the group released a music video for "More Freaks", which was directed by Gorilaman X.

== Critical reception ==
Professional ratings
Review scores
Source	Rating
AllMusic	3/5 stars
HipHopDX	3/5 stars
RapReviews	7.5/10
Record Collector	3/5 stars
The New Rolling Stone Album Guide	3.5/5 stars

Upon its release, Steve Juon of RapReviews gave Pimp to Eat a generally favorable review, emphasizing that the album may not appeal to listeners who expect conventional themes and production. He complimented Ice-T's "scientific and obtuse" rap style while still noticing his voice and style as recognizable. Juon considered the tracks "More Freaks", "So Bad", "Perms, Baldheads, Afros & Dreds", "Country Girls", and "We Sleep Days" to be "unique and enjoyable".

Christopher R. Weingarden of Ink 19 compared Pimp to Eat to Keith's past projects and stated that the album could represent a speculation on the "future of hip-hop". HipHopDX gave a more mixed reception on the album, saying that while it is entertaining and that the "spaced out sound" matches Keith's artistic identity, he found it repetitive by the end of the album and claimed that some tracks including "2005", "Who Wanna Be Down", "War", and "Doubleback" are underwhelming. The New Rolling Stone Album Guide (2004) described Pimp to Eat as "another must of odd excellence" in Keith's discography.

Retrospectively, AllMusic writer Matt Kantor described Pimp to Eat as similar to a "great Marvel Comics supervillain crossover" with the combination of pimp imagery, and said that everyone in the Analog Brothers did well on their own part in making the album. The Big Takeover's Chuck Foster saw Pimp to Eat as an "unheard masterpiece" and hoped for a sequel album to occur. Inky Tuscadero of Record Collector considered Keith to be the "star of the show" and described the album as "cartoonish" while remaining "utterly lightweight and consistently fun". Hip Hop Golden Age ranked Pimp to Eat at number 12 on their "Top 30 Kool Keith Albums" list in 2023, stating that it doesn't appeal to everyone, but considers it a "must-have" for Ice-T and Kool Keith fans.

== Track listing ==
All music is composed by Analog Brothers.

No.	Title	Length
1.	"Analog Brother's Intro"	3:41
2.	"Analog Technics" (featuring Odd Oberhiem)	4:52
3.	"More Freaks"	4:03
4.	"2005" (featuring Odd Oberhiem)	4:29
5.	"So Bad"	4:03
6.	"Analog Annihilator vs. Silver Surfer"	3:49
7.	"Perms, Baldheads, Afros & Dreds"	4:09
8.	"Who Wana Be Down" (featuring Rhyme Syndicate)	4:43
9.	"Country Girl"	4:03
10.	"War" (featuring DJ Cisco and Jacky Jasper)	4:04
11.	"Doubleback"	3:48
12.	"We Sleep Days" (featuring Jacky Jasper)	3:43
13.	"Bionic Oldsmobile"	4:27
14.	"Shut Down Show" (featuring Synth-A-Size Sisters)	3:24
15.	"Once I Get It" (featuring Teflon)	1:04
16.	"Analog Outro"	2:19
Total length:		60:26

== Personnel ==
Credits are adapted from the album's liner notes. (Note: Jacky Jasper is also known as H Bomb, being credited under that name on "War".)

- Christopher Rodgers (Silver Synth) - vocals, synthesizer, lazar bells
- Rex Colonel Doby Jr. (Rex Roland) - vocals, keyboards, drums
- Tracy Lauren Marrow - vocals, keyboards, drums
- Keith Matthew Thornton - vocals, bass, strings
- Marc Giveand (Mark Moog) - vocals, violins, drums
- Kurt Kurzweil Matlin - mixing
- Gene Grimaldi - mastering
- Dr. Dave Stotts - photography
- Odd Oberhiem - featured artist (tracks: 2, 4)
- Jacky Jasper - featured artist (tracks: 10, 12)
- Sheldon Harris - featured artist (track 15)
- Rhyme Syndicate - featured artist (track 8)
- DJ Cisco - featured artist (track 10)
- Synth-A-Size Sisters - featured artist (track 14)
