= Intelligence & Ignorance =

Studio album by Ed O.G.
- Released: February 5, 2013
- Recorded: 2012
- Genre: Hip hop
- Length: 32:09
- Label: Envision Entertainment
- Producer: Oh No, Cam Bluff, Max Mostley, Microphono, RMG

Ed O.G. chronology
A Face In the Crowd (2011)	Intelligence & Ignorance (2013)

Intelligence & Ignorance is the fourth studio album by Ed O.G. It was released on February 5, 2013, through Envision Entertainment. The album features guest appearances by Freestyle (of Arsonists) and Noel Gourdin with the production from Oh No, Cam Bluff, Max Mostley, Microphono and RMG.

== Track listing ==
No.	Title	Producer(s)	Length
1.	"Done Talking"	Oh No	3:19
2.	"What They Say"	Microphono	3:37
3.	"Power"	Microphono	2:08
4.	"Easy"	Microphono	2:26
5.	"Love I Need" (featuring Freestyle)	Microphono	3:16
6.	"Bags & Shoes"	RMG	3:39
7.	"Give It to Me"	Max Mostley	3:28
8.	"Can't Wait" (featuring Noel Gourdin)	Max Mostley	2:55
9.	"Change" (featuring Noel Gourdin)	Cam Bluff	2:53
10.	"Hold U"	Microphono	4:28
