= The Lost Masters, Vol. 2 =

Lost Masters 2

Compilation album by Kool Keith
- Released: August 9, 2005
- Genre: Hip hop
- Length: 56:46
- Label: DMAFT Records
- Producer: Kool Keith

Kool Keith chronology
White Label Mix Series, Vol. 1 (2004)	Lost Masters 2 (2005)	Collabs Tape (2006)

Professional ratings
Review scores
Source	Rating
AllMusic	2/5 stars
RapReviews	4/10 stars

Lost Masters Volume 2 is the second compilation album by American rapper and producer Kool Keith from Ultramagnetic MCs. It was released on August 9, 2005, via DMAFT Records, making it his third effort on the label. The album is a follow-up to The Lost Masters.

== Track listing ==
All lyrics are written by "Kool" Keith Thornton; all music is composed by "Kool" Keith Thornton.

No.	Title	Length
1.	"Move"	3:14
2.	"Women Turn on Your TV"	3:43
3.	"She Likes Your Sex"	3:36
4.	"Varoom"	2:41
5.	"Can't Fuck with This"	4:26
6.	"The Voo Doo"	3:48
7.	"Feel About You"	3:43
8.	"Kiss My Ass"	2:45
9.	"Two Steps"	2:20
10.	"Star Struck"	2:35
11.	"No Stress"	3:05
12.	"Tell Em Bitch"	2:58
13.	"I Want You to Be"	3:54
14.	"14th Song on the Album"	2:29
15.	"Think You're Sexy"	2:50
16.	"Iraqi Verse"	2:12
17.	"Keep on Jumpin'"	3:04
18.	"Dark Thought (Outro)"	3:24
Total length:		56:46

== Personnel ==
- Keith Matthew Thornton – main artist, producer
- Jay – audio engineering
- Mark Likosky – photography
- Jim Rasfeld – graphic design
