= Analog Brothers =

Experimental hip-hop band

Background information
- Genres: Hip-hop
- Years active: 2000, 2014, 2016
- Labels: Ground Control Records; Junkadelic Music; Mello Music Group
- Members: Ice-T; Keith Korg; Rex Roland JX3P; Marc Moog; Silver Synth; Kiew Nikon

Analog Brothers were an experimental hip-hop band featuring Tracy "Ice-T" Marrow (Ice Oscillator) on keyboards, drums and vocals, Keith "Kool Keith" Thornton (Keith Korg) on bass, strings and vocals, Marc Live (Marc Moog) on drums, violins and vocals, Christopher "Black Silver" Rodgers (Silver Synth) on synthesizer, lazar bell and vocals, and Rex Colonel "Pimpin' Rex" Doby Jr. (Rex Roland JX3P) on keyboards, vocals and production.

== Music ==
The group's only studio album Pimp to Eat featured guest appearances by various members of Rhyme Syndicate, Odd Oberheim, Jacky Jasper (who appears as Jacky Jasper on the song "We Sleep Days" and H-Bomb on "War"), D.J. Cisco from S.M., Synth-A-Size Sisters and Teflon.

== Legacy ==
While the group only recorded one album together as the Analog Brothers, a few bootlegs of its live concert performances, including freestyles with original lyrics, have occasionally surfaced online. After Pimp to Eat, the Analog Brothers continued performing together in various line ups. Kool Keith and Marc Live joined with Jacky Jasper to release two albums as KHM. Marc Live rapped with Ice-T's group SMG. Marc also formed a group with Black Silver called Live Black, but while five of their tracks were released on a demo CD sold at concerts, Live Black's first album has yet to be released.

In 2008, Ice-T and Black Silver toured together as Black Ice, and released an album together called Urban Legends.

In 2013, Black Silver and newest member to Analog Brothers, Kiew Kurzweil (Kiew Nikon of Kinetic) collaborated on the joint album called Slang Banging (Return to Analog) with production by Junkadelic Music. In addition to all this, the Analog Brothers continue to make frequent appearances on each other's solo albums.

== Discography ==
- 2000 - 2005 A.D. (single), Ground Control Records/Nu Gruv
- 2000 - Pimp to Eat (LP), Ground Control Records/Mello Music Group
- 2014 - Slang Banging (Return to Analog), Junkadelic Music
