= Earatik Statik =

American hip hop group

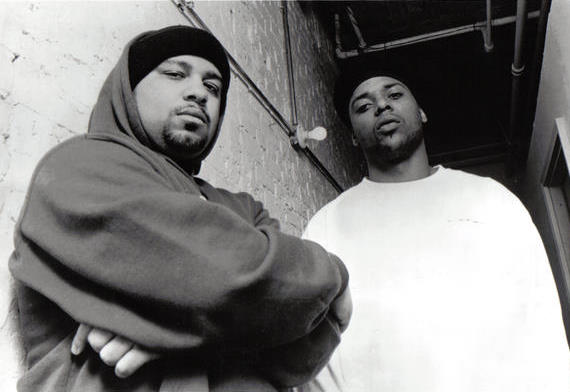

Background information
- Origin: Chicago, Illinois
- Genres: Hip hop
- Years active: 1999 to present
- Label: Gravel Records

Earatik Statik is a Chicago based underground Hip Hop group that has been around since 1999. The group consists of two MCs, Sef Rich and Carlos Polk.

== Early years ==
Between 1999 and 2007 they released nine 12 inch vinyl singles on various labels, as well an EP and two CDs, Lox it Down Suite (2000) produced by Brother El (Lional Freeman) and Feelin Earatik (2005). The Good, the Bad and the Ugly (2009) Feelin Earatik received critical acclaim from top magazines, including four stars in URB. It was also featured in The Source, Independence Day section, and XXL's Chairman Choice.

== Recording history ==
Earatik Statik has recorded with some of the top names in Hip Hop history, including Sadat X, Diamond D, K-Solo, Ed O.G., Sean Price, Pacewon of the Outsidaz and Kool Keith. They have also released their followup to Feelin Earatik entitled The Good, The Bad and The Ugly, on March 17 on Gravel Records, which was originally projected for a June 2007 . The album features a production from legendary Hip Hop producer Pete Rock, as well as a remix by Large Professor. It also features verses from Sadat X, Sean Price, Ed O.G. and Tony Benefit. In 2013 they released the single "Big Fire" on Manta Ray Records.

== Discography ==
Album information
Feelin Earatik
- Released: 2005
- Label: Gravel Records
The Good, the Bad and the Ugly
- Released: 2009
- Label: Gravel Records

=== EPs and singles ===
- "Lox it Down / Stange (12", 1999) Strik9 Records
- "Hot Lava / Natural Disaster (12", 2000) Indus Records
- "Keep Rockin'" (12", 2003) Headnock Records
- "Stop Playin'" (12", 2003) Tuff Luv Ent
- "Evil is Timeless" (12", 2000) Gravel Records
- "Alley Rap / Mission Destruction" (12", 2003) Filthy Habits Recordings
- "Big Fire" (2013) Manta Ray Records

== Appears on ==
- 2002 "Evil Is Timeless" (from 0.0.0.CD, Album) Ozone Music
- 2004 "Get Right" (from Chapter Seven CD, Album) EV Productions
- 2004 "Get Right" (from Chapter Seven Album) EV Productions
- 2004 "It's Our Turn" (from Civil War CD) Molemen Records
- 2004 "Feels So Good, Before ... (From Now On CD) EV Records
- 2004 "Feels So Good" (from Session 3 (12") Street) EV Records
- 2006 "Mission Destruction" (from Collabs Tape 2xCD) Junkadelic Zikmu
- 2006 "Don't Fuck Wit Us" (from Don't Fuck Wit Us 12") Wax Work
- 2007 "Knock Em Out The Box" (from Master P CD, Album) Duck Down Records
