= Heather Hunter =

American pornographic actor (born 1969)

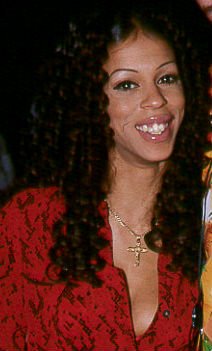
- Hunter at the 2001 AVN Adult Entertainment Expo
- Born: Heather Keisha Hunter; October 1, 1969 (age 57); The Bronx, New York, U.S.
- Other name: Double H
- Occupations: Rapper; painter; author; pornographic actress
- Height: 5 ft 3 in (1.60 m)
- Website: heatherhunter.com

Heather Keisha Hunter (born October 1, 1969), nicknamed Double H, is an American rapper, painter, author, and pornographic actress. She is a member of the AVN, Urban X, and XRCO Halls of Fame.

== Early life ==
Heather Keisha Hunter was born on October 1, 1969, in The Bronx, New York, to a funeral salesman. She left home at 16 and supported herself by working as a clerk at the Latin Quarter, one of the first downtown/midtown clubs to play rap. At the age of 18, she answered an ad in The Village Voice for striptease artists. Pictorials in Players and Swank followed. Subsequently, the offers to appear in pornographic films started to emerge.

== Career ==
=== Film and television ===
Hunter entered the adult film business in 1988 and her career peaked in the mid-'90s. She was one of the few performers to use her actual name rather than a stage alias. She became known for her interracial- and lesbian-themed films. In her hometown she was a mainstay on the Robin Byrd Show and was a frequent performer.

From 1990 to 1992, during her Los Angeles years, Hunter was a dancer on the TV show Soul Train. Hunter has described how she was able to conceal her porn career from Soul Train producer Don Cornelius. She also played the role of a hooker in the black comedy horror film Frankenhooker as Chartreuse.

She got her start while dancing at the Latin Quarter in New York City, where she met adult film actress Hyapatia Lee, who suggested she perform in movies. Her first video, Heather Hunter On Fire, came out in 1988. She did a few low-budget movies for New York-based Vidway before moving to Los Angeles and eventually becoming the first African-American woman to be a Vivid Entertainment contract girl. She has 51 videos and 1 directorial effort to her credit on the Internet Adult Film Database; her final adult video appears to be Honeywood, released in 1999. Old scenes with Hunter continue to be released in numerous compilations.

In 1996, she, Nina Hartley, and Angel Kelly appeared in the music video of Tupac Shakur's How Do U Want It.

Hunter was inducted into the AVN Hall of Fame in 2003. The same year she starred in her own animated cartoon series, Bulletproof Diva, in which she saves the world from the inhabitants of Hell.

In 2004, she and Ginger Lynn appeared in non-sex roles in Hustler's Can You Be A Pornstar?

Hunter was inducted into the Urban X Hall of Fame in 2008 and XRCO Hall of Fame in 2022.

=== Music career ===
Hunter has been involved with music professionally since 1993, when she was under contract with Island Records doing House music. She released a song titled "I Want It All Night Long." Hunter later worked for Tommy Boy Records without much progress, as the company did not know whether to market her as an R&B or pop singer.

Hunter released an 18-track rap music album on July 12, 2005, titled Double H: The Unexpected. She released the music through Blo Records label, owned by her long-time manager, Dave Copeland. Hunter is the company's CEO. In creating the album, she worked with well-known music producers DJ Premier and Scott Storch. Guests on her album include Akinyele, Madison Taylor, plus Chalu and Erin Yes. Hunter's old adult movie friend Janet Jacme appears on the interlude of "My Toolbox." "So Serious" was the only single released from the album. The single and her album's title refers to Hunter's desire to be taken seriously as a hip-hop musician. Hunter said in a VIBE interview:

What people may not expect is how serious I am about this. I really want people to take me seriously. Being retired from the adult industry nearly thirteen years ago, I think I've done enough in the mainstream business and I want to be accepted as an equal, as an artist. I'm going for my respect whether they give it to me or not.

From 1998 to 2000, Hunter hosted The Peep Show on pay-per-view TV. The program was originally hosted by rapper Luther Campbell as Luke's Peep Show. It was a raunchy interview show that aired uncensored music videos. On a 1998 episode, she met rapper Akinyele, who encouraged her to pursue a music career after hearing a sample of her raps. He later appeared with Mr. Cee on Double H: The Unexpected.

Hunter has recorded with Esham ("All Night Everyday" off his album Tongues). Songs also feature Kool Keith ("I Wanna Play" off his album Spankmaster), N.O.R.E. ("Big D" off his album God's Favorite. Also features Akinyele & Khia), Bubba Sparxxx ("Would You Like", which was cut from his album Deliverance), Above the Law ("Freak In Me" and "Playas, Gangstas And Ballers" from their album Sex, Money & Music).

==== Songs ====
- "I Want It All Night Long" (1993)
- "So Serious" (2005)
- "In Love"
- "Orgasmic"

=== Painting and writing ===
Hunter has had an interest in art since she was a child, when she began painting portraits of family members. She furthered this love by majoring in design and illustration at High School of Fashion Industries in New York City. For a short time during her teenage years, she was involved in illegal graffiti art as Ms. 45, but quit after being cited by the police. She enrolled in a special workshop under the direction of renowned street artist, Keith Haring.

In June 2006, Hunter opened her own art gallery, Artcore-NYC, in the DUMBO section of Brooklyn, New York. She debuted her "Hunter Collection" paintings as the gallery's first exhibition. The gallery was located at 111 Front Street, and as of 2007 there was an ongoing search for a new location.

She wrote a novel, Insatiable: The Rise of a Porn Star, by Hunter and Michelle Valentine, which was published on July 24, 2007, by St. Martin's Press. It purports to tell the story of Simone Young, a young woman with a career and background similar to Hunter's. In an interview, Hunter implied that her story would be fictionalized to protect the privacy of others. A plagiarism suit was filed against Hunter by Dianne Miller; Miller claimed she gave a manuscript to Hunter in 2005, and then Hunter copied a number of passages verbatim from the manuscript for her own novel. In November 2008, a judge dismissed most of the claims against Hunter.

== Interviews ==
- Heather Hunter: Not What You'd Expect, MVRemix, June 2005
- Double H-Heather Hunter Interview, Tha Biz, June 2005
- Heather Hunter: Life After Porn Stardom, Black Voices, July 2007
- Inside Out With Heather Hunter, Urban Reviews, August 2007
