= Clayborne Family =

Studio album by Clayborne Family
- Released: October 20, 2004
- Recorded: 2004
- Studio: Clayborne Family Studio (Los Angeles, CA)
- Genre: Underground rap
- Length: 51:00
- Label: Threshold Recordings
- Producer: Kool Keith (also exec.); Marc Live (also exec.); Jacky Jasper a.k.a. H-Bomb (also exec.); Crashman; DJ Junkie Lou

KHM/Clayborne Family chronology
Game (2002)	Clayborne Family (2004)

Kool Keith chronology
Diesel Truckers (2004)	Clayborne Family (2004)	Nogatco Rd. (2006)

Professional ratings
Review scores
Source	Rating
RapReviews	7.5/10 stars

Clayborne Family is the second studio album by KHM, an American rap group consisting of Kool Keith, Jacky Jasper (a.k.a. H-Bomb) and Marc Live. It was released on October 20, 2004, via Threshold Recordings and was produced by Crashman, DJ Junkaz Lou, and all the three members of the group. Tim Dog, Crash Man, Guerilla Black and Black Silver made their guest appearances on the record.

== Track listing ==
No.	Title	Producer(s)	Length
1.	"Clayborne Intro"	DJ Junkie Lou	1:58
2.	"Clayborne Family" (featuring Guerilla Black)	Crashman	4:04
3.	"Let Me Show 'Em"	Crashman	4:19
4.	"You Gonna Get It" (featuring Crashman)	Crashman	2:54
5.	"New York City"	Crashman	4:07
6.	"Need It Like That"	Crashman	3:18
7.	"Checkin Tha Doe!" (featuring Tim Dog)	Marc Live; Kool Keith; Jacky Jasper	4:01
8.	"Stick 'Em" (featuring Tim Dog & Black Silver)	Marc Live; Kool Keith; Jacky Jasper	3:18
9.	"This Is How It's Done"	Marc Live; Kool Keith; Jacky Jasper	3:16
10.	"Gaza Strip"	Marc Live; Kool Keith; Jacky Jasper	3:53
11.	"Can I Touch Your Butt Girl"	Marc Live; Kool Keith; Jacky Jasper	3:43
12.	"Clayborne BBQ"	Marc Live; Kool Keith; Jacky Jasper	3:25
13.	"It's Gonna Be a Problem"	Marc Live; Kool Keith; Jacky Jasper	4:01
14.	"Xecutive Decision 2004"	DJ Junkie Lou	3:36
15.	"Clayborne Outro"	DJ Junkie Lou	1:30
Total length:			51:00

== Personnel ==
- Keith Matthew Thornton – vocals, producer (tracks: 7–13), executive producer
- Marc Giveand – vocals, producer (tracks: 7–13), executive producer
- Sean Merrick – vocals, producer (tracks: 7–13), executive producer
- Crashman – vocals (track 4), producer (tracks: 2–6)
- Charles Williamson – additional vocals (track 2)
- Christopher Rodgers – additional vocals (track 8)
- Timothy Blair – vocals (tracks: 7–8)
- Louis Gomis – producer (tracks: 1, 14–15)
- Shoet – artwork

== Reception ==
South Coast Today stated the album "can feel utterly dysfunctional at times" but praised it for taking chances and noted some good verses. Hip Hop Golden Age gave a positive review, saying that the "album that feels dark, unpredictable, and endlessly replayable."
