= Slow Your Roll (album) =

Studio album by Time Machine
- Released: May 25, 2004
- Studio: Bubbla (Providence, Rhode Island) CNJ (Providence, Rhode Island) Depth Charge Studio (Burke, Virginia) Embedded Studios (New York, New York) Studio 54 (Boston, Massachusetts)
- Genre: Hip-hop
- Length: 60:39 • CD/LP; 64:23 • Digital/Australia; 69:37 • Japan
- Labels: Glow-in-the-Dark; Miclife; Inertia; Earshot
- Producers: Martian Gang; Stoerok; Mekalek; Jaysonic; Edan; Curty Cut

Time Machine chronology
Slow Your Roll (2004)	TM Radio (2005)

Singles from Slow Your Roll
- 1. "Reststop Sweetheart" Released: 2001; 2. "Personal Ads" Released: 2002; 3. "Nights Lights" Released: 2004; 4. "On The Moon" Released: 2005

Slow Your Roll is the debut studio album by American hip-hop group Time Machine. It was released by Glow-in-the-Dark Records on May 25, 2004. The album was produced by Martian Gang (DJ Real and Shin-Ski), Stoerok, Mekalek, Jaysonic, Edan and Curty Cut. It features guest appearances from Edo G., Romen Rock and Edan. It was released by Miclife Recordings in Japan, and by Glow-in-the-Dark, Inertia and Earshot Music in Australia.

== Critical reception ==
Professional ratings
Review scores
Source	Rating
AllMusic	3.5/5 stars
Cokemachineglow	84%
Hip Hop Golden Age	7.5/10
RapReviews	10/10

The album was praised by many critics for its "golden era" sound.

Noel Dix of Exclaim! said "each jam has a distinct flavour to it that you really would have a hard time narrowing Time Machine down to a single sound."

Karl Palma of Resident Advisor expressed "Slow Your Roll is an excellent album - neat production skills, party style rhymes and wicked scratching to boot". He compared the group to The Pharcyde and Ugly Duckling.

The album received XXL's Chairman's Choice and the group was compared to The Pharcyde. In 2005, it was a feature album on Triple J.

Retrospective

In 2018, Phillip Mlynar of Bandcamp Daily noted the albums "jazz-sampling golden age hip-hop production techniques and creative but humble concept-centric lyrics".

In 2020, Hip Hop Golden Age ranked it number 24 on their list of top hip-hop albums of 2004.

== Track listing ==
No.	Title	Producer	Length
1.	"Time's Fly"	Martian Gang	3:00
2.	"A Million And One Things To Do"	Stoerok	3:41
3.	"Let's Not Be Real"	Stoerok	2:56
4.	"Reststop Sweetheart"	Stoerok	3:06
5.	"Spelling Bee" (hosted by Special K of Awesome 2)	Mekalek	3:22
6.	"Mind In A Spin" (featuring Edo G.)	Mekalek	4:08
7.	"The Assembly Line"	Stoerok	1:15
8.	"Who Needs A Mic?"	Stoerok	3:58
9.	"Personal Ads" (featuring Romen Rock)	Mekalek	4:46
10.	"The Mekster"	Mekalek	2:09
11.	"Stoerokinit"	Stoerok	3:28
12.	"Night Lights"	Jaysonic	3:48
13.	"A Cold Day In Hell"	Mekalek	2:59
14.	"Water In Your Cereal"	Mekalek	2:50
15.	"A$$hole" (featuring Edan)	Edan	3:37
16.	"Especially4U"	Curty Cut	3:36
17.	"Thinking About You"	Martian Gang	3:48
18.	"The Way Things Are"	Mekalek	4:12
Total length:			60:39

Digital/Australia bonus track
No.	Title	Producer	Length
19.	"The Wiggle"	Mekalek	3:44
Total length:			64:23

Japan bonus tracks
No.	Title	Producer	Length
19.	"On The Moon"	Martian Gang	4:02
20.	"Personal Ads Remix" (featuring Boomy)	Entity	4:56
Total length:			69:37

Additional vocals

- Pam Jennings on "Let's Not Be Real"
- Folami on "Reststop Sweetheart"
- DJ Deez Nutz on "The Mekster"
- Jahpan on "Night Lights"
- DJ Curty Cut on "Especially4U"

Scratches

- DJ Pre on "A Million And One Things To Do"
- All other scratches by Mekalek

Other credits

- Mixed by David W. Prout and Melalek at Boo Studio in Wakefield, Rhode Island
- Mastered by Ricardo Gutierrez at The Hit Factory in New York, New York
