= Game (KHM album) =

Studio album by KHM
- Released: November 19, 2002
- Recorded: 2002
- Studio: The Crack House West (Hollywood, California); The Flower Shop (Hollywood); The Silent Sound Studios (Hollywood)
- Genre: Underground hip-hop
- Length: 53:26
- Label: Number 6
- Producer: Marc Live; Kool Keith; H-Bomb aka Jacky Jasper

KHM/Clayborne Family chronology
| Game (2002) | Clayborne Family (2004) |

Kool Keith chronology
| Spankmaster (2001) | Game (2002) | Kool Keith Presents Thee Undatakerz (2004) |

Professional ratings
Review scores
| Source | Rating |
|---|---|
| AllMusic | 3/5 stars |
| The New Rolling Stone Album Guide | 2/5 stars |

Game is the debut studio album by KHM, an American rap group consisting of Kool Keith, H-Bomb (aka Jacky Jasper) and Marc Live. It was released on November 19, 2002 via Number 6 Records and was entirely produced by all the three members of the group. English trip hop artist Tricky made guest appearance on the track "Run Dem Red". The album peaked at number 42 on the Top R&B/Hip-Hop Albums, number 33 on the Independent Albums, number 26 on the Heatseekers Albums.

The trio later changed the name to Clayborne Family and released their second album titled Clayborne Family on October 20, 2004 via Threshold Recordings.

== Track listing ==
All music is composed by Marc Live, Kool Keith, H-Bomb.

| No. | Title | Length |
|---|---|---|
| 1. | "Intro" (Skit) | 1:01 |
| 2. | "Really Want U" | 3:49 |
| 3. | "Nice Things" | 3:38 |
| 4. | "Game" | 3:38 |
| 5. | "U Jerk Chickens" | 3:56 |
| 6. | "Run Dem Red" (featuring Tricky) | 3:44 |
| 7. | "Skit 2" | 0:36 |
| 8. | "Copy What U Want" | 4:41 |
| 9. | "New York" | 4:21 |
| 10. | "Rock Is Dead" | 4:41 |
| 11. | "Gotta Do - Main" | 3:44 |
| 12. | "Space" | 3:31 |
| 13. | "Xecutive Decision" | 3:31 |
| 14. | "Sally" | 9:15 |
| Total length: | | 53:26 |

== Personnel ==
- Keith Matthew Thornton – vocals, keyboards, producer, executive producer
- Marc Giveand – vocals, mixing, programming, producer, executive producer
- Sean Merrick – vocals, keyboards, mixing, producer, executive producer
- Davida "The Diva" Sullivan – singing vocals
- Adrian Nicholas Matthews Thaws – featured artist (track 6)
- Darrick Angelone – executive producer
- Gene Grimaldi – mastering
