= Funk 'n Pussy =

Album by Schoolly D

Studio album by Schoolly D
- Released: October 24, 2000
- Recorded: 1999–2000
- Genres: Gangsta rap; hardcore rap
- Label: Chord
- Producers: Schoolly D, DJ Code Money, DJ Chuck Chillout

Schoolly D chronology
Reservoir Dog (1995)	Funk 'n Pussy (2000)	International Supersport (2010)

Singles from Funk 'n Pussy
- 1. "Can You Feel It" Released: 1999; 2. "YahMean" / "Yes, Yes, Ya'll" Released: 2000

Professional ratings
Review scores
Source	Rating
AllMusic	3/5 stars

Funk 'n Pussy is an album by rapper Schoolly D. The album was released in 2000 for Chord Records and was produced by Schoolly D, DJ Code Money, and DJ Chuck Chillout. Reviews for the album were generally mixed, but like his previous albums, the album was a commercial failure.

The album spawned three singles: “Do It, Do It,” “Can You Feel It,” and “Yes Yes Y’all.” The first track, “Yahmean,” featured fellow hip hop emcees Chuck D and Lady B. “Mr. Big Dick 2000” is a remix by the UK trip hop outfit Sneaker Pimps.

== Track listing ==
1. “Yahmean” (feat. Chuck D, Lady B & Rasheed) – 4:05
2. “Our Own Style” – 0:49
3. “Seven Eleven” – 3:12
4. “Do It, Do It” – 3:09
5. “Make Your Money” – 3:34
6. “Funkvibe Get Loose” – :56
7. “Can You Feel It” – 3:10
8. “Yes Yes Y’all” – :50
9. “Doodoobutt” – 3:45
10. “Funk and Pussy” – 4:46
11. “Achydick” – 1:08
12. “Get Butt Naked” – 4:24
13. “Mr. Big Dick 2000” – 5:38
14. “Techno Funk” – 5:00
