= Welcome to America (Schoolly D album) =

Studio album by Schoolly D
- Released: February 1, 1994
- Recorded: 1993
- Genres: Gangsta rap; hardcore hip hop; East Coast hip hop
- Labels: Ruffhouse; Columbia
- Producers: Schoolly D; DJ Code Money; Mike Tyler; Joe Nicolo

Schoolly D chronology
How a Black Man Feels (1991)	Welcome to America (1994)	Reservoir Dog (1995)

Singles from Welcome to America
- 1. "Another Sign" Released: 1993

Welcome to America is an album by the American rapper Schoolly D (Schooly D on the album cover), released in 1994 via Ruffhouse Records. It was a commercial disappointment. Two singles were released: “Welcome to America” and “Another Sign”, which was promoted with a video by director Rich Murray.

== Production ==
The album was created with the assistance of Ruffhouse's house band, and was recorded at Studio 4, in Philadelphia. Joe Nicolo helped to produce and mix Welcome to America.

The beat on "Wanna Get Dusted" is a slower version of the one used on "PSK What Does It Mean?"

== Critical reception ==
Professional ratings
Review scores
Source	Rating
AllMusic	4/5 stars
Chicago Sun-Times	2/4 stars
Robert Christgau	(dud)
The Encyclopedia of Popular Music	3/5 stars
RapReviews	4/10
The Source	2.5/5 stars
Spin Alternative Record Guide	6/10

Westword wrote that "the focus is on dark, bass-driven grooves that give the title track and chillingly effective street fables such as 'I Know You Want to Kill Me' an undeniable immediacy." Trouser Press deemed the album "a hardcore record that sounds miles better than any others Schoolly's made, strapped with psychedelic guitar, thundering bass grooves, tense rhythms, bits of horn, piano and sound effects." The Philadelphia Inquirer wrote that "the most interesting tracks on Welcome to America use creative drum-machine loops as well as live drums, wah-wah guitar and jazz piano to create tense, unusually rich textures that overshadow the narratives of 'No Good Nigga' and 'I Know You Want to Kill Me'." Minya Oh of The Source liked the use of live musicians, but believed that "the vocals ruin the feel". She criticized both the lack of diversity in lyrics and the "choppy rhyme delivery".

== Track listing ==
1. “Intro” – 1:14
2. “I Wanna Get Dusted” – 4:14
3. “I Know You Want to Kill Me” – 3:56
4. “Welcome to America” – 4:10
5. “Niggas Like Me” – 4:19
6. “Gangsta Trippin” – 4:37
7. “Gimme Your Shit Nigga” – 2:52
8. “No Good Nigga” – 3:46
9. “I Shot da Bitch” – 4:27
10. “Motherfuckin D” – 4:32
11. “Stop Frontin” – 4:22
12. “Peace of What” – 2:22
13. “Another Sign” – 4:31

== Samples ==
- "Gimme Your Shit Nigga"
  - "More Bounce to the Ounce" by Zapp
- "Stop Frontin'"
  - "Latoya" by Just-Ice
