= Janice McClain =

American singer

- Born: Janice Michell McClain; 25 January 1964 (age 62)
- Origin: Philadelphia, Pennsylvania United States
- Genres: Dance-pop, disco, pop, R&B
- Occupation: Singer
- Instrument: Vocals
- Years active: 1978–present
- Labels: Warner Bros. Records, RFC Records, Mon-Tab, MCA Records

Janice Michell McClain (born 25 January 1964 in Philadelphia, Pennsylvania) is an American R&B singer, probably best known for her 1979 disco hit "Smack Dab in the Middle".

== Early life and teenage career ==
McClain was raised in North Philly, the only child of a construction father and a mother who worked as a secretary and later as a dressmaker. Singing nearly from infancy in church, McClain grew up in a musical household - both of her parents had themselves cut records as teenagers - McClain becoming conversant at an early age with current Soul hits, showtunes and opera: her early idols included Freda Payne and Diana Ross and as a teenager McClain became an especial fan of Michael Jackson. A student at the Philadelphia High School for the Creative and Performing Arts, McClain also studied at Settlement Music School.

At age 14 McClain's evident vocal prowess led to her professional performing debut singing with the local jazz ensemble Pieces of a Dream: also when McClain was 14, her uncle Milton Tennant, a songwriter and record producer, had McClain cut her first record. Shortly after her fifteenth birthday McClain recorded the track "Smack Dab in the Middle", co-written and co-produced by Tennant and Thom Page (the latter also an uncle of McClain's): the track was successfully shopped to RFC, the recently launched Warner Bros. disco-oriented label, and released October 1979 to become one of the Top Ten most-played tracks in American discothèques for the first five weeks of 1980. However the track would not become a mainstream success - barely crossing over to the R&B chart with a #91 peak - and although McClain did cut tracks for a projected album she had no evident further releases prior to two mid-1980s 12" singles.

== Adult career ==
On 10 July 1982 - a month after her high school graduation - McClain was in the lineup of a Robin Hood Dell benefit concert alongside such Philly soul stars as McFadden & Whitehead, Harold Melvin & the Blue Notes & Billy Paul. Two days before her nineteenth birthday McClain reportedly caused a local sensation making her debut at the premiere North Philly jazz club Jewel's, with McClain rapidly becoming established as a top lounge act, regular gigs at Jewel's leading to engagements at New Jersey venues. McClain also performed at the Kool Jazz Festival "jazz picnic" at Waterloo Village in June 1983, and would serve as opening act for Philly engagements of such top R&B acts as James Brown and the Commodores, also opening for the O'Jays in Atlantic City.

People magazine on the album Janice McClain
"[McClain's] disciplined, wide-ranging voice...carr[ies] her...album, without a lot of production support. She often sounds terrific, but it's almost as if she is singing scales a lot of the time, so amorphous are the songs. It couldn't have helped that the LP lists 19 different producers & arrangers dealing with the work of 20 different composers on its nine tracks. While McClain rings out loudly & clearly above the confusion, it's more to make herself heard than to make music. Even the mild success of the single 'Passion & Pain' is hard to understand."

While performing at the Trump Plaza (Atlantic City) showroom Jezebel's late in 1984 McClain was scouted by Jheryl Busby, head a&r rep for the Soul music division of MCA Records: Busby had been tipped off re McClain by Patti LaBelle after the latter had caught McClain's act either at Jezebel's or at Harrah's Marina where McClain had made her Atlantic City debut that September. Mcclain was signed to MCA in July 1985 with her self-titled album originally scheduled for a 30 April 1986 release with a March release for the balladic track "Let's Spend the Night" as advance single: however the album's release was delayed until the year's end with the dance track "Passion & Pain" as lead single, "Let's Spend the Night" being issued as the second single in April 1987: neither the album nor its singles were successful with only "Passion and Pain" charting, stalling at #75 on the R&B chart.

Subsequent to a 1994 12" single release, McClain's recording resume has comprised chorale duties for Philly-area sessions, contributing to the albums It's Long Overdue by Keith Martin (1994), All the Way From Philadelphia by the Three Tenors of Soul (William Hart, Ted Mills, Russell Thompkins Jr.) (2007), Love, Niecy Style by Deniece Williams (2007), and George Clinton & His Gangsters of Love (2008), plus the 2010 seasonal EP Ronnie Spector's Best Christmas Ever. She remains an active live performer in Philadelphia and its surrounding area.

== Discography ==
=== Studio albums ===
- Janice McClain (MCA Records, 1986)

=== Singles ===
Year	Song	Peak chart positions	
Year	Song	US R&B	US Dance
1979	"Smack Dab in the Middle"	91	6
1983	"Giving My Love"	—	—
1984	"Burnin' Up"	—	—
1986	"Passion and Pain"	75	—
1986	"Let's Spend the Night"	—	—
1994	"Peace of Mind"	—	—
"—" denotes releases that did not chart.
