= Schoolly D (album) =

Studio album by Schoolly D
- Released: April 17th, 1985
- Recorded: 1984 - 1985
- Genres: Hip hop; gangsta rap
- Length: 38:04
- Labels: Schoolly D Rhythm King (UK); Jive/RCA; 1338-J
- Producers: Schoolly D DJ Code Money

Schoolly D chronology
Schoolly D (1985)	Saturday Night! – The Album (1986)

Singles from Schoolly D
- 1. "P.S.K. What Does It Mean? / Gucci Time" Released: 1985; 2. "Put Your Fila's On" Released: 1986; 3. "Free Style Rapping" Released: 1986; 4. "I Don't Like Rock 'N' Roll" Released: 1986

Schoolly D is the debut studio album by American rapper Schoolly D. It was released on Schoolly D Records possibly in April 17th, 1985 and reissued in 1990 by Jive Records. It was produced by Schoolly D and DJ Code Money.

The album is considered to be the predecessor of gangster rap and a major influence on the first albums of Ice-T and Public Enemy as well as an influence and sample source for Beastie Boys and countless others.

== Reception ==
Professional ratings
Review scores
Source	Rating
AllMusic	4/5 stars

Simon Reynolds of Melody Maker described the debut in 1986 as "the most extreme hardcore hip-hop record I have ever encountered." and that "It is so far from r'n'b and from funk, so far from ingratiating pleasantness, that the only comparisons I can think of are white ones, groups like the Swans or Killing Joke – precision machine music, a pop abattoir, it can rightly be considered avant-garde." Reynolds went on to state that the strongest track was "P.S.K. (What Does It Mean)" and that "Put Your Filas On" was "another standout."

== In popular culture ==
"Gucci Time" was sampled in E-40's song "Stilettos & Jeans" featuring Bobby V, taken from his 2010 album Revenue Retrievin': Night Shift.

“PSK (What Does it Mean?)” was sampled in Siouxsie & the Banshees’ track “Kiss Them for Me,” taken from its 1991 album Superstition.

== Track listing ==
All tracks written by Schoolly D.

No.	Title	Length
1.	"I Don't Like Rock & Roll"	5:56
2.	"Put Your Filas On"	7:16
3.	"Free Style Rapping"	7:16
4.	"P.S.K. What Does It Mean?"	6:32
5.	"Gucci Time"	6:10
6.	"Free Style Cutting"	5:16
Total length:		38:04
