= Larr =

Larr or LARR may refer to:

- &larr;, the HTML entity for ← (left arrow symbol)
- Larr (region), linguistic and geographical region in Sindh, Pakistan
- LARR Act, abbreviation for the Right to Fair Compensation and Transparency in Land Acquisition, Rehabilitation and Resettlement Act, 2013 Act of Indian Parliament
- Latin American Research Review, academic journal established in 1965

== People ==
- Timothea Larr (born 1940), naval architect
- Larry Larr (stage name of Lawrence Hill, born 1971), American rapper
