= Saturday Night! – The Album =

Studio album by Schoolly D
- Released: 1986
- Recorded: 1986
- Studios: INS, New York
- Genre: Hip hop
- Label: Schoolly-D
- Producer: Schoolly D

Schoolly D chronology
Schoolly D (1985)	Saturday Night! – The Album (1986)	Smoke Some Kill (1988)

Singles from Saturday Night! – The Album
- 1. "Saturday Night" Released: 1986; 2. "Dedication To All B-Boys / I Don't Like Rock 'N' Roll" Released: 1987

Saturday Night! – The Album is the second studio album by hip hop artist Jesse Weaver under the alias of Schoolly D. The album was recorded at INS Studios in New York where Weaver created an album of seven tracks that included rapping and instrumentals that were both inspired by and sampled various funk musicians from the 1970s. The album was released independently in 1986. Singles from the album included the tracks "Saturday Night" and "Dedication to All B-Boys".

Saturday Night! – The Album was re-issued by Jive Records in 1987 with several extra tracks that were originally intended for Weaver's follow-up album Smoke Some Kill. The album charted on the Billboard's Black Albums chart and the UK Top Indie Album chart on its release. The album content was described by AllMusic as putting Weaver "in hot water with many critics and community leaders." Critical reception on its release was mixed with the album being referred to as "artless" by The Washington Post while other critics such as Robert Christgau gave it a positive review. The NME placed it on its list of the top albums of 1987.

== Production ==
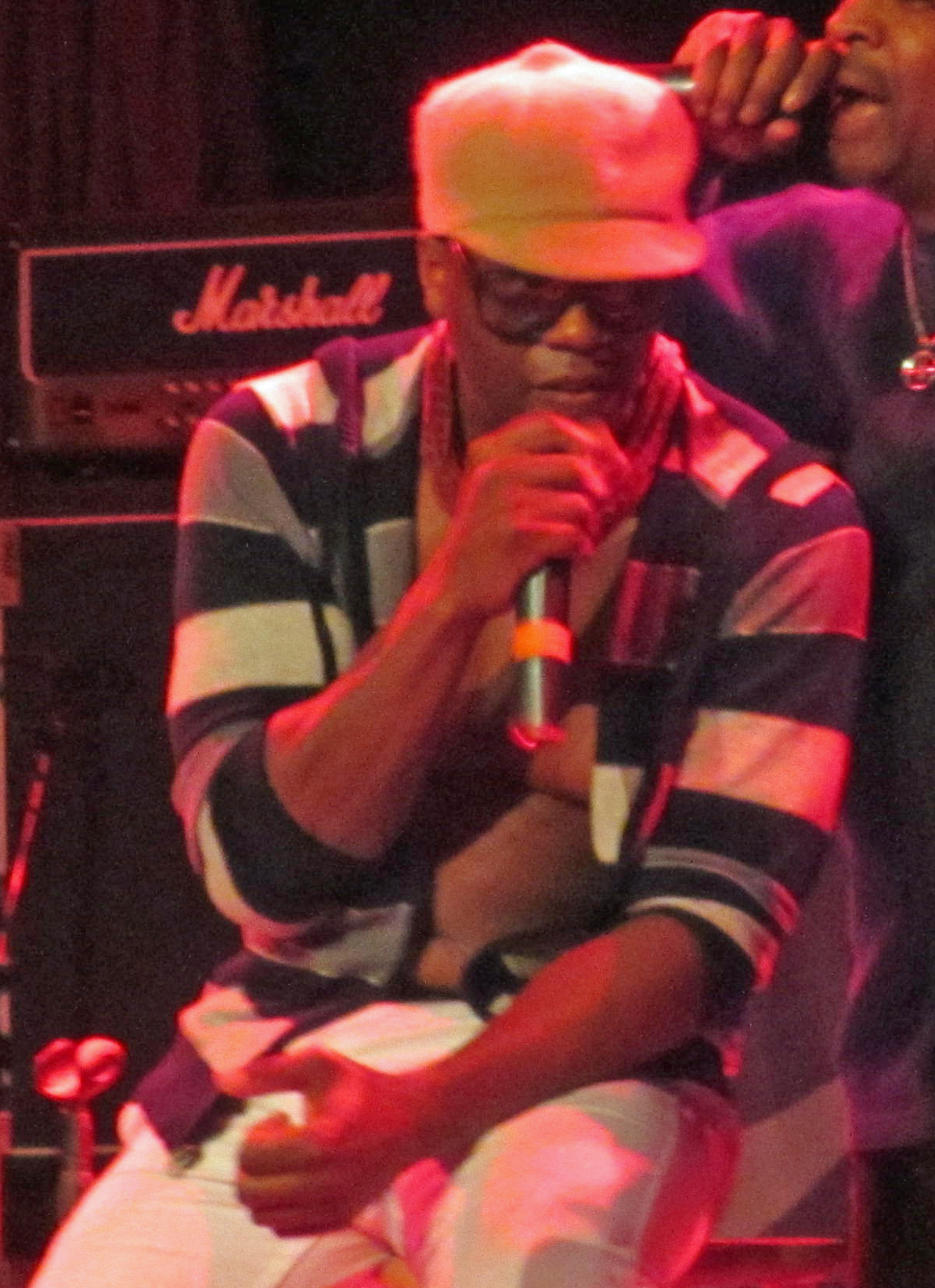
Schooly D in 2012.

Weaver began recording Saturday Night! – The Album in 1986. He was being barred from the studio where he originally recorded his single for "P.S.K. What Does It Mean?" and went to INS Studios in New York. To compose the music, Weaver first started working on the drums, stating that "by 1985 I had mastered the [Roland TR-]909." After completing the drums, Weaver worked on lyrics and vocals when he "smoked and drank until we got silly enough. At that point, the first thing that hit my mind-that was the song". Some songs were performed with live musicians such as "B-Boy Rhyme and Riddle" which had a live drummer brought in by engineer Joe Nicolo. The music on "Saturday Night" was the result of DJ Codemoney forgetting a plug for the 909. Weaver used the drum machine at the studio to record the song without the 909 on hand and accidentally pushed a button that sent the kick and snare to go to the timbales sound. This new sound was used for the song "Saturday Night".

The initial release of Saturday Night! – The Album consisted of seven songs and was released through Weaver's own Schoolly-D Records. Weaver signed with Jive Records to "pay a lot of bills" as the distributors of his previous work were not paying him for the records that were sold. Saturday Night! – The Album was re-released by Jive in 1987 with extra tracks including "Parkside 5-2", "Housing the Joint" and "Get N' Paid". These three tracks were originally intended for Weaver's next album Smoke Some Kill. Weaver was upset after finding these new tracks added to the album, stating that "it was a total scam to reissue Saturday Night like they did, with those tracks, because it had already sold hundreds of thousands of copies." and that if these tracks were released on Smoke Some Kill, his follow-up album would have "been an even better record".

== Style ==
Brian Coleman, author of Check the Technique described Saturday Night! – The Album as "what everything that Schoolly D was all about: funk, loose rhymes and attitude." "We Get Ill" was reviewed by Spin, which called it "a seamy celebration of bad habits and bad language. The track was inspired by Bootsy Collins and initially was going to be an instrumental. "Do It, Do It" was developed in DJ Code Money’s basement when he was working on a break involving Funkadelic's song "You'll Like It Too". The song samples the nursery rhyme "Who's Afraid of the Big Bad Wolf?" taken from a children's record. "Dedication to All B-Boys" was inspired by the group The Commodores. The track features a Weaver's disc jockey, DJ Code Money, performing a long break at the end. Weaver explained this part of the song by stating that in "rock and funk groups, everybody who was part of the band got to do their thing. And Code was part of the band."

AllMusic writer David Jeffries noted songs such as "Saturday Night", stating it as "the kind of sleazy tale of misogyny that put Schoolly in hot water lwith many critics and community leaders." Mat Snow of Sounds wrote that Weaver said his lyrics commanding a woman to "do it doggy style" in his song "Do It Do It", are a reflection of his background and audience, and not necessarily how he feels about others. Weaver reflected on the song "Saturday Night" as being about "my 17 year old Saturday night" which consisted of going down to the Parkside Inn, drinking, and "watching the bitches on the corner" and that the song was not meant to be taken literally, but that he "did come home once with a girl and I forgot my key and my mom was pissed off, but she didn't pull a gun; she's never owned a gun in her life".

"Housing the Joint" was influenced by a trip to California when he heard the song "Thank You (Falettinme Be Mice Elf Agin)" by Sly and the Family Stone. Upon hearing it, Weaver booked studio time and recorded the song in a day. The track's lyrics involve a conflict Weaver had with rapper Spoonie Gee and his song "That's My Style" where he claims that Weaver was appropriating his technique. Weaver has since performed with Spoonie Gee on stage and later stated he "never felt comfortable" performing this track in concert.

== Release ==
Saturday Night! – The Album was first released on Schooly-D Records in 1986. On the album's Jive Records re-release, it charted on Billboard's Top Black Albums for ten weeks peaking at number 59. In the United Kingdom, the album was released by Mute Records affiliate called Rhythm King where it charted on the UK Indie Charts for 10 weeks peaking at number four. Singles for the album included "Saturday Night" and "Dedication to All B-Boys" released on Schooly-D Records and Flame Records. Both "Saturday Night" and "Dedication to All B-Boys" appeared on the UK Indie Charts. On its release, Philadelphia's city officials had the album removed from store shelves after public outrage over the violent content in the songs.

Saturday Night! – The Album was released for the first time on compact disc by Funky Town Grooves on July 21, 2014. The CD release included radio edits, remixes and instrumentals of songs from the album as bonus tracks.

== Reception ==
Professional ratings
Review scores
Source	Rating
AllMusic	4/5 stars
Robert Christgau	B
New York Daily News	3/4 stars
Sounds	3/5 stars
Spin Alternative Record Guide	8/10 [Independent release]
Spin Alternative Record Guide	9/10 [Jive release]

From contemporary reviews, The Washington Post gave the album a mixed review, stating that "even by rap standards, [Schooly D's] work is artless." The review compared the album negatively to other rappers, noting that they "construct complex hip-hop concertos for voice, beat-box and borrowed sounds, Schooly's best-known work is little more than a beat accompanying his foul-mouthed, ill-tempered rants". The review also found that "there's no denying that his harsh communiqués crackle with a mean-streets vitality as fascinating as his confrontational world view is disturbing." Robert Christgau gave the Jive reissue of the album a B, stating "What other rapper would write a rhyme about the night his mother pulled a gun on him—or make it so clear that, just like in West Side Story, he's depraved on account of he's deprived. This doesn't speak too well of white critics, obviously, but it also doesn't take away his raps, his rips, or his muscleman groove." Spin stated that it "can't sustain an album with just reverb and a cowbell. Even if it is killer reverb and a way funky cowbell." The NME placed Saturday Night! – The Album at number 20 on its list of the top albums of 1987.

The single "Saturday Night" was also listed at number 28 on its list of Top 50 tracks of the year. David Hinckley of the New York Daily News gave the album a three-star rating, stating that "while everything doesn't match [the title track "Saturday Night"]" there's plenty here to establish him as a solid rap citizen." declaring that the artist "may take the most consistently unsparing look at the streets since "The Message". James Brown gave the album a three star rating in Sounds, stating that "Musically, Saturday Night has all the makings of a rough and ready street LP but it falls far short of the calibre of Public Enemy's records." Brown continued that Schooly D would "rather rant on about bitches, guns and mutha******s, as loud and sneering as possible, than use alliteration, wit or onomatopoeia to spice his rhymes. He'd rather whine like a man who's just put his finger through the toilet paper than put any sense of feeling or emotion into his delivery."

Spin Alternative Record Guide (1995) gave the original release an eight out of ten and the Jive re-release a nine out of ten. The review concluded that Jive's release was superior as it included "some of Schoolly's best cuts ("Housing the Joint," "Park-side 5-2")" AllMusic gave the album a four-star rating, finding it better than Weaver's previous album Schooly D due to "higher production values and more direct songs.

== Track listing ==
All songs are written and produced by Schooly D (J.B. Weaver Jr.).

Original Schooly-D Records release

Side A

1. "We Get Ill" – 4:06
2. "Do It Do It" – 2:56
3. "Dedication to All B-Boys" – 4:02
4. "We Get Paid" – 2:58

Side B

1. "B-Boy Rhyme and Riddle" – 5:06
2. "Saturday Night" – 5:26
3. "It's Crack" – 5:30

Track listing adapted from Saturday Night! – The Album back cover and vinyl sticker.

Jive Records re-release

Side A

1. "Housing the Joint" – 5:06
2. "We Get Ill" – 4:06
3. "Do It Do It" – 2:56
4. "Dedication to All B-Boys" – 4:02
5. "Get n' Paid" – 2:58
6. "Dis Groove is Bad" – 4:30

Side B

1. "Parkside 5-2" – 5:48
2. "B-Boy Rhyme and Riddle" – 5:48
3. "Saturday Night" – 5:26
4. "It's Krack" – 5:30

Track listing from Jive's Saturday Night! – The Album back cover and vinyl sticker.

== Personnel ==
=== Original Schooly-D Records release ===
- Schooly D – music, words, writer, producer, artwork
- Joe "The Butcher" – engineer

Credits adapted from Saturday Night! – The Album front and back cover and vinyl sticker.

=== Jive Records release ===
- Schooly D—music, lyrics, writer, producer, artwork
- Joe "The Butcher"—engineer
- Arthur Mann—executive producer
- Herb Powers Jr.—mastering engineer
- Rick Cohn—executive producer

Credits adapted from Jive's Saturday Night! – The Album front cover, back cover, dead wax, and vinyl sticker.

== Charts ==
=== Album ===
Chart (1987)	Peak position
US Top Black Albums	59
UK Indie Chart	4

=== Singles ===
Chart (1987)	Title	Peak position
UK Indie Chart	"Saturday Night"	18
UK Indie Chart	"Dedication to All B-Boys"	11

== See also ==
- 1986 in music
- New school hip hop
