= Reservoir Dog =

Studio album by Schoolly D
- Released: 1995
- Recorded: 1994–1995
- Genres: Gangsta rap; hardcore hip hop
- Label: PSK
- Producers: Schoolly D Grizz Bear & Devine

Schoolly D chronology
Welcome to America (1994)	Reservoir Dog (1995)	Funk 'N Pussy (2000)

Singles from Reservoir Dog
- 1. "Nigger Entertainment" Released: 1995

Professional ratings
Review scores
Source	Rating
AllMusic	3/5 stars
The Encyclopedia of Popular Music	3/5 stars

Reservoir Dog is the seventh album by rapper Schoolly D. The album was released in 1995 via PSK Records and was produced by Schoolly D and Grizz Bear & Devine. Reviews were mostly positive; however, like his previous albums, the album was a commercial failure and did not chart on any album charts. The album featured one single, “Nigger Entertainment.”

== Track listing ==
1. “Welcome to Funkadelica”
2. “Nigger Entertainment”
3. “Reservoir Dog”
4. “Big Fat Bytches”
5. “Ghettofunkstylistic”
6. “Hustler Life”
7. “Gotta Hustle to Survive”
8. “Date with Death”
9. “If You See My Little Brother”
10. “Schoolly-D Live”
11. “Eternity”
