= How a Black Man Feels =

How A Black Man Feels

Studio album by Schoolly D
- Released: 1991
- Recorded: 1991
- Genres: Gangsta rap; political hip hop
- Length: 45:45
- Label: Capitol
- Producer: Schoolly D

Schoolly D chronology
Am I Black Enough for You? (1989)	How A Black Man Feels (1991)	Welcome to America (1994)

Singles from How a Black Man Feels
- 1. "King of New York" Released: 1990; 2. "Original Gangster" Released: 1991; 3. "Where'd You Get That Funk From" Released: 1991

How a Black Man Feels is the fifth album by the American rapper Schoolly D. It was released in 1991 via Capitol Records, his first album for the label. The album spawned three singles, "Original Gangster", “Where’d You Get That Funk From”, and “King of New York”.

== Production ==
KRS-One contributed to the production of the album. Schoolly D considered How a Black Man Feels to be a guide on living, and escaping from, the ghetto.

== Critical reception ==
Professional ratings
Review scores
Source	Rating
AllMusic	3/5 stars
The Encyclopedia of Popular Music	3/5 stars
The Rolling Stone Album Guide	2/5 stars
Spin Alternative Record Guide	3/10

Trouser Press wrote that "other than the unfashionable stripped-down beats (complete with Run-DMC samples), Schoolly’s ugly and all-too-common gangsta threats ... sound like a sorry-ass imitation jackin’ for bucks."

== Track listing ==
1. “Run” – 4:12
2. “Your Worst Nightmare” – 4:52
3. “King of New York” – 4:35
4. “Original Gangster” – 3:39
5. “Die Nigger Die” – 4:56
6. “Where’d You Get That Funk From” – 4:43
7. “How a Black Man Feels” – 3:50
8. “Just Another Killer” – 5:32
9. “Peace to the Nation” – 4:45
10. “Sometimes It’s Got to Be That Way” – 4:41
