= List of gangsta rap artists =

The following is a list of gangsta rap artists.

Contents
0–9 A B C D E G H J K L M N P S T U W X Y Z

== 0–9 ==
- 11/5
- 187 Fac
- 213
- 21 Savage
- 3X Krazy
- 40 Glocc
- 50 Cent

== A ==
- Above the Law
- AMG
- AZ
- Ant Banks

== B ==
- B.G.
- Bone Thugs-n-Harmony
- Boo-Yaa T.R.I.B.E.
- Boss
- Brotha Lynch Hung
- Bun B
- Bushwick Bill

== C ==
- C-Bo
- Chief Keef
- C-Murder
- Cold 187um (aka Big Hutch)
- Comethazine
- Compton's Most Wanted
- Cypress Hill

== D ==
- Detroit's Most Wanted
- Daz Dillinger
- DJ Quik
- Do or Die
- Doggy's Angels
- Dr. Dre
- Dru Down

== E ==
- E-40
- Eazy-E

== G ==
- The Game
- Gangsta Boo
- Geto Boys
- Freddie Gibbs

== H ==
- Hard Boyz
- Havoc & Prodeje

== I ==
- Ice Cube
- Ice-T
- Illslick

== J ==
- Ja Rule
- Just-Ice
- Jay-Z
- Juvenile
- Juicy J
- Young Jeezy
- Jim Jones
- Juice WRLD
- Julio Foolio

== K ==
- Kendrick Lamar
- King Von
- Knight Owl
- Kurupt

== L ==
- Lil Rob
- Lunasicc
- Lil Durk

== M ==
- Mac Dre
- Mac Mall
- Mack 10
- Master P
- MC Eiht
- MC Ren
- Mia X
- Mobb Deep
- Mozzy
- Mac Miller
- Mr. Capone-E
- Mr. Serv-On

== N ==
- N.W.A
- N2Deep
- Nardo Wick
- Nate Dogg
- The Notorious B.I.G.

== P ==
- Pimp C
- Pop Smoke

== R ==
- Ray Luv

== S ==
- Scarface
- Schoolboy Q
- Schoolly D
- Tupac Shakur
- Silkk the Shocker
- Skee-Lo
- Snoop Dogg
- Soulja Slim
- South Central Cartel
- South Park Mexican
- Spice 1
- Sidhu Moose Wala

== T ==
- Tay-K
- Tha Dogg Pound
- Thug Life
- Too Short
- TRU
- Three 6 Mafia

== U ==
- UGK

== W ==
- Warren G
- Westside Connection
- WC
- WC and the Maad Circle
- Willie D

== X ==
- X-Raided
- XXXTentacion

== Y ==
- Ya Boy
- YoungBoy Never Broke Again
- Yungeen Ace

== Z ==
- Z-Ro
