= The Goats =

American hip hop group from Philadlphia, PA

Background information
- Origin: Philadelphia, Pennsylvania, United States
- Genres: Hip hop, rap rock
- Years active: 1991–1994
- Label: Ruffhouse/Columbia
- Past members: Madd; OaTie Kato; Swayzack
- Website: http://jimmyluxury.com/thegoats.htm

The Goats were an American alternative hip hop trio from Philadelphia, Pennsylvania.

== History ==
The group formed in 1991 with founding vocalists and rappers Oatie Kato (James D'Angelo) and Swayzack (Patrick Shupe). The group's early lineup also included sisters Love and Rucyl Mills, along with Oatie's brother, Vinnie Angel. Following an introduction to Madd (also known as "the M-A-the-double-D", Maxx Stoyanoff Williams) through dance musician King Britt, the group released a self-titled cassette featuring this lineup. The group took its name from a combination of the word "scapegoats" and the expression "Don't get my goat." According to Swayzack, the name reflected the members' frustration with the government, which they felt had "gotten their goat" at the time.

The Goats had a full musical band as well, which included drummer Chuck Treece and multi-instrumentalists Pierce Ternay and bassist E.J. Simpson. Mark Boyce ( Boss Hogg, Delta 72, and G. Love and Special Sauce) contributed keyboards and voiced many of the characters on "Tricks of the Shade" A Ruff House promotion photo shows an eight-piece lineup.

The group recorded on Columbia Records / Ruffhouse Records, and their first album, Tricks of the Shade (1992), has been called one of the best Philadelphia albums of all time.

They released two studio albums. Tricks of the Shade (1992) was produced by OaTie Kato and producer Joe "the Butcher" Nicolo) and released by Ruffhouse Records. It peaked at No. 58 in the UK Albums Chart in August 1994. Their follow-up album was No Goats, No Glory (1994), released by Columbia Records.

The Goats toured with Urge Overkill, Dog Eat Dog, Cypress Hill, Public Enemy, Beastie Boys and Luscious Jackson.

In 1994, OaTie Kato departed The Goats, reportedly because he missed a plane flight to a tour date. He was replaced by vocalist and drummer Derek "D'Recka" Pierce. Later projects have included working alongside his brother directing and writing the 2007 film, The Orange Thief, which won a number of festival circuit awards, and founding the group Jimmy Luxury in 2009 which was signed to Sony Records. He has since left the music business and now holds seminars on the use of Bitcoin and various other topics such as climate change. Swayzack would cease all musical activity after the band broke up. Remaining member Madd continues to perform and produce music, first with the Goats spin-off group Incognegro and later with Black Landlord and SPK.

In 2019, a live album by the Goats, Live at Khyber Pass — July 4th, 1993, was released and featured on the iTunes UK landing page for a week. In the introduction to the 2019 book about Ruffhouse Records, by Chris Schwartz, The Roots lead man QuestLove writes that the Goats requested his band to warm up for them, resulting in their first live show.

== Discography ==
=== Albums ===
- Tricks of the Shade - Ruffhouse/Columbia – 1992
- No Goats, No Glory - Ruffhouse/Columbia – 1994
- Live at Khyber Pass — July 4th, 1993 – 2019
