= Tricks of the Shade =

Studio album by the Goats
- Released: 1992
- Genres: Alternative rock; hip hop; rap rock
- Label: Ruffhouse
- Producers: OaTie Kato; Joe "The Butcher" Nicolo

The Goats chronology
Tricks of the Shade (1992)	No Goats, No Glory (1994)

Tricks of the Shade is the debut album by American hip hop group the Goats, released in 1992 though Columbia Records sub-label Ruffhouse Records. It was produced by OaTie Kato and Joe "The Butcher" Nicolo. The artwork was done by Oatie's brother and former Goats member Vinnie Angel.

Two singles were released from the album, "¿Do the Digs Dug?" and "Typical American", the latter of which appeared on Ruffhouse Records' final release in 1999, the greatest hits compilation Ruffhouse Records Greatest Hits. "¿Do the Digs Dug?" was included on the 1992 Columbia Records Zebrahead soundtrack.

== Content ==
Although largely touted as a theme album with a backstory following the two characters Chicken Little and Hangerhead as they make their way through Uncle Scam’s Federally Funded Welfare & Freakshow to find their mother who was jailed for attempting an illegal abortion, Tricks of the Shade features politically charged lyrics. It takes aim at such figures as then-US President George H. W. Bush, Christopher Columbus, and Daryl Gates. Criticism and observations were made upon topics such as militarism, police brutality, patriotism, classism, and racism. Other persons mentioned in songs include Nelson Mandela, Willie Horton, Yusef Hawkins, Minnesota Fats and Leonard Peltier.

== Critical reception ==
Professional ratings
Review scores
Source	Rating
AllMusic	4/5 stars
Chicago Tribune	3/4 stars
Robert Christgau	A
Rolling Stone	4/5 stars

Tricks of the Shade earned some critical acclaim, including 4 of 5 stars in its review by Rolling Stone, and an A from Robert Christgau. The Chicago Tribune opined that "the bulk of the collection features some hard-hitting music, freshened by the presence of five distinct rap voices."

In 2016, NME named it the 12th best album of 1993.

== Track listing ==
1. "We Got Freaks" – 1:00
2. "Typical American" – 4:36
3. "Hangerhead Is Born" – 1:24
4. "Whatcha Got Is Whatcha Gettin'" – 4:13
5. "Columbus' Boat Ride" – 1:17
6. "Ru Down wit da Goats" – 4:21
7. "Cumin' in Ya Ear" – 3:51
8. "Noriega's Coke Stand" – 1:30
9. "Got Kinda Hi" – 3:23
10. "Unodostresquattro" – 1:21
11. "Georgie Bush Kids" – 1:17
12. "Wrong Pot 2 Piss In" – 3:42
13. "Hip-Hopola" – 4:42
14. "Leonard Peltier in a Cage" – 1:24
15. "¿Do the Digs Dug?" – 4:31
16. "Carnival Cops" – 1:46
17. "TV Cops" – 4:23
18. "Tattooed Lady" – 1:36
19. "Tricks of the Shade" – 4:19
20. "Not Not Bad" – 3:29
21. "Rovie Wade, the Sword Swallower" – 1:09
22. "Aaah D Yaaa" – 3:26
23. "Drive-By Bumper Cars" – 1:48
24. "Burn the Flag" – 3:53
25. "Uncle Scam's Shooting Gallery" – 2:46
