= Larry Larr =

American rapper

- Born: Lawrence Hill; September 4, 1971 (age 54); Logan, Philadelphia, Pennsylvania U.S.
- Genres: Hip hop
- Occupation: Rapper
- Years active: late 1980s–early 1990s
- Labels: Ruffhouse; Columbia

Lawrence Hill (born September 4, 1971), better known by his stage name Larry Larr, is an American rapper. He first came in the music wave with other Philadelphia rappers such as Schooly D, Steady B and DJ Jazzy Jeff & The Fresh Prince in the mid eighties. He first signed his deal with Ruffhouse Records and released his debut album entitled "Da Wizzard Of Odds" in 1991 with the lead single "Larry, That’s What They Call Me" which only charted on the Hot Rap Songs at the position 7 and his second single "Confused" only made it at 10 on the Hot Rap Songs as well. However the album didn't sell well only making 67 on Top R&B/Hip-Hop Albums chart.

== Studio albums ==
Year	Title	Chart positions
Year	Title	U.S. R&B
1991	Da Wizzard of Odds: Released: July 16, 1991; Label: Ruffhouse, Columbia	67
