= Validated (album) =

Studio album by Keith Martin
- Released: March 23, 2004
- Genre: R&B
- Length: 60:02
- Label: Orchard
- Producer: Greg Gali-Rivera

Keith Martin chronology
Love of My Life (2004)	Validated (2004)	I'm Not Alone (2005)

Validated is an album by Keith Martin, released on March 23, 2004 by the Orchard label. The song "Whateva U Need" was released as a single. This was his last U.S. album to be released during his lifetime.

== Track listing ==
No.	Title	Writer(s)	Length
1.	"Validated"	Lyka Santos; Keith Martin; Charles Richards	5:19
2.	"Groove On"	Martin	4:20
3.	"Let Me Be the One"	Martin	4:36
4.	"My Thang"	Jesse Johnson; Martin	4:16
5.	"Keepin It Real"	Martin; Keith Nisby	4:05
6.	"The Only One"	Martin; Kenneth Michaels	3:56
7.	"Cry No More"	Christopher Thornton	5:23
8.	"Coming Home"	Martin; Kowan Paul	4:40
9.	"Whateva U Need"	Greg Gali-Rivera; Martin	3:31
10.	"That Women Is You"	Martin; Sanfus Reeves	4:58
11.	"Work It Out"	Martin; Nisby	4:44
12.	"Starship"	Norman Connors; Gali-Rivera; Martin	3:21
13.	"Thank You"	Martin	4:52
14.	"Because of You"	Martin	4:07

== Album credits ==
Executive Producer: Greg Gali-Rivera
Producers: Keith Martin, Christopher Thornton, Charles Richards, Kowan "Q" Paul, Jesse Johnson's Revue and others.
