= Dyslexicon =

Studio album by Dandelion
- Released: August 1, 1995
- Genre: Grunge
- Length: 41:41
- Label: Ruffhouse
- Producer: Phil Nicolo

Dandelion chronology
I Think I'm Gonna Be Sick (1993)	Dyslexicon (1995)

Dyslexicon is the second and final album by the Philadelphia grunge band Dandelion, released in 1995.

The band promoted the album by touring with Quicksand; they also played the 1995 Lollapalooza festival. Its first single, "Weird-Out", reached No. 14 on the Billboard Modern Rock Tracks chart.

== Critical reception ==
Professional ratings
Review scores
Source	Rating
Robert Christgau	(neither)

The Philadelphia Inquirer determined that "the band rages through every cliche in the modern- rock lexicon yet manages to make each one as invigorating as a cold shower in a heat wave." Trouser Press wrote: "Despite the extra instrumentation ... Dyslexicon is bland, and an anticlimactic false ending provides a poetic inkling of the sputtering fade-out soon in store for this over-hyped band."

The Hartford Courant stated: "Cut through the trippy fuzz that gives this album such a homogeneous throwback acid-rock feel, and you're into some seriously hard-core rock 'n' roll." The Record concluded that "there is an intriguingly ever-present babble of raw noise just beneath the surface of Dyslexicon, but the vague cliches of the song titles—'Super Cool', 'Weird-Out', 'Whatever'—bespeak a group directionless and muddled."

== Track listing ==
All tracks by Dandelion

1. "Pass the Stone" – 2:45
2. "Weird-Out" – 3:41
3. "Trailer Park Girl" – 3:16
4. "What a Drag" – 3:03
5. "Super Cool" – 4:31
6. "Retard" – 2:30
7. "False Alarm" – 2:00
8. "Tapped" – 5:17
9. "Whatever" – 1:47
10. "Snow Job" – 4:16
11. "Viva Kneval" – 3:44
12. "Melon from Heaven" – 4:51

Two promotional singles from the album were released, "Weird-Out" and "Trailer Park Girl." Both of these singles feature at least one or two remixes.
