= Ruffhouse Records =

American record label

- Founded: 1989; 37 years ago July 12, 2012; 14 years ago (relaunch)
- Status: Active
- Distributors: Columbia Records (1989–present; back catalogue only); EMI (2012–2013); Universal Music Group (2013–present)
- Genre: Hip-hop; R&B
- Location: Philadelphia, Pennsylvania, U.S.
- Official website: ruffhouserecords.com

Ruffhouse Records is an American record label founded in 1989 by Chris Schwartz and Joe Nicolo as a joint venture with Columbia Records. In 1999, Schwartz and Nicolo closed the label, and Schwartz and Kevon Glickman continued with RuffNation Records. Ruffhouse's artist roster at the time of its original closing included The Fugees, Cypress Hill, Kris Kross, Wyclef Jean, Lauryn Hill, and Leela James.

The label was relaunched on July 12, 2012, through EMI, with Beanie Sigel as the first artist to be out through its relaunch with the release of his album This Time (2012).

== Notable artists ==
- Beanie Sigel
- Cheba
- Cypress Hill
- Dandelion
- DMX
- John Forté
- Fugees
- The Goats
- Glenn Lewis
- Larry Larr
- Lauryn Hill
- Pras
- Leela James
- Wyclef Jean
- Keith Martin
- King Britt
- Kool Keith
- Kris Kross
- Lin Que
- Mountain Brothers
- Nas
- Pacewon
- Psycho Realm
- Schoolly D
- Sporty Thievz
- Tim Dog
- Armand Van Helden
- Josh Wink

== Discography ==
Artist	Album	Details
Larry Larr	Da Wizzard of Odds (released with Columbia)	Released: July 16, 1991; Chart position: —; RIAA certification: —
Cypress Hill	Cypress Hill (released with Columbia)	Released: August 13, 1991; Chart position: 31 U.S.; RIAA certification: 2× Platinum
Tim Dog	Penicillin on Wax (released with Columbia)	Released: November 12, 1991; Chart position: 155 U.S.; RIAA certification: —
Kris Kross	Totally Krossed Out (released with So So Def/Columbia)	Released: March 31, 1992; Chart position: 1 U.S.; RIAA certification: 4× Platinum
The Goats	Tricks of the Shade (released with Columbia)	Released: November 1992; Chart position: —; RIAA certification: —
Dandelion	I Think I'm Gonna Be Sick (released with Columbia)	Released: March 1993; Chart position: —; RIAA certification: —
Tim Dog	Do or Die (released with Columbia)	Released: April 20, 1993; Chart position: —; RIAA certification: —
C.E.B.	Countin' Endless Bank (released with Columbia)	Released: July 6, 1993; Chart position: —; RIAA certification: —
Cypress Hill	Black Sunday (released with Columbia)	Released: July 20, 1993; Chart position: 1 U.S.; RIAA certification: 4× Platinum
Kris Kross	Da Bomb (released with Columbia)	Released: August 3, 1993; Chart position: 13 U.S.; RIAA certification: Platinum
The Fugees	Blunted on Reality	Released: January 25, 1994; Chart position: —; RIAA certification: —
Schoolly D	Welcome to America (released with Columbia)	Released: February 1, 1994; Chart position: —; RIAA certification: —
The Goats	No Goats, No Glory (released with Columbia)	Released: September 20, 1994; Chart position: —; RIAA certification: —
Keith Martin	It's Long Overdue (released with SME)	Released: April 18, 1995; Chart position: —; RIAA certification: —
Dandelion	Dyslexicon (released with Columbia)	Released: August 1, 1995; Chart position: —; RIAA certification: —
Cypress Hill	III: Temples of Boom (released with Columbia)	Released: October 31, 1995; Chart position: 3 U.S.; RIAA certification: Platinum
Kris Kross	Young, Rich & Dangerous (released with So So Def/Columbia)	Released: January 9, 1996; Chart position: 15 U.S.; RIAA certification: Gold
The Fugees	The Score (released with Columbia)	Released: February 13, 1996; Chart position: 1 U.S.; RIAA certification: 7× Platinum
Wyclef Jean	The Carnival (released with Columbia)	Released: June 24, 1997; Chart position: 16 U.S.; RIAA certification: 2x Platinum
Psycho Realm	The Psycho Realm (released with Columbia)	Released: October 28, 1997; Chart position: 183 U.S.; RIAA certification: —
Armand van Helden	Sampleslaya: Enter the Meatmarket (released with Columbia)	Released: November 10, 1997; Chart position: —; RIAA certification: —
King Britt Presents Sylk 130	When The Funk Hits The Fan (released with Ovum Recordings/Columbia)	Released: January 27, 1998; Chart position: —; RIAA certification: —
Josh Wink	Herehear (released with Ovum Recordings/Columbia)	Released: March 1998; Chart position: —; RIAA certification: —
John Forté	Poly Sci (released with Columbia)	Released: June 23, 1998; Chart position: 84 U.S.; RIAA certification: —
Sporty Thievz	Street Cinema	Released: August 18, 1998; Chart position: —; RIAA certification: —
Lauryn Hill	The Miseducation of Lauryn Hill (released with Columbia)	Released: August 25, 1998; Chart position: 1 U.S.; RIAA certification: 10× Platinum (Diamond)
Cypress Hill	IV (released with Columbia)	Released: October 6, 1998; Chart position: 11 U.S.; RIAA certification: Gold
Pras	Ghetto Supastar (released with Columbia)	Released: October 27, 1998; Chart position: 55 U.S.; RIAA certification: —
Kool Keith	Black Elvis/Lost in Space (released with SME/Columbia)	Released: August 10, 1999; Chart position: 180 U.S.; RIAA certification: —
Beanie Sigel	This Time (released with State Property/EMI)	Released: August 28, 2012; Chart position: —; RIAA certification: —
Glenn Lewis	Moment of Truth (released with EMI)	Released: October 15, 2013; Chart position: —; RIAA certification: —
