= No Goats, No Glory =

Studio album by the Goats
- Released: 1994
- Genre: Hip hop
- Label: Ruffhouse/Columbia

The Goats chronology
Tricks of the Shade (1992)	No Goats, No Glory (1994)	Live at Khyber Pass (2019)

No Goats, No Glory is the second album by the American hip hop group the Goats, released in 1994 through Ruffhouse Records. It was the group's final studio album.

== Production ==
The album was produced by the Goats and Joe "The Butcher" Nicolo. Oatie Kato had left the group; Madd and Swayzack recorded the album as a duo, incorporating more of a live band sound. Compared to the debut, the album contained fewer lyrics that dealt with politics, instead embracing "gangster" and party themes.

== Critical reception ==
Professional ratings
Review scores
Source	Rating
AllMusic	2.5/5 stars
Robert Christgau	(choice cut)
The Encyclopedia of Popular Music	3/5 stars
Entertainment Weekly	A
MusicHound R&B: The Essential Album Guide	2.5/5 stars
Rolling Stone	2.5/5 stars
Seventeen	3/4 stars

Entertainment Weekly wrote: "Musically fluid and lyrically poetic, choice cuts like 'Lincoln Drive' exemplify these Philadelphians’ punk-funk sound." Robert Christgau singled out "Butcher Countdown" for praise. The Washington Post thought that "because they're following the trend toward softer, jazzier beats, most of the album has little urgency." Rolling Stone opined that "the athletic scratching and murky, bass-heavy rumble of 'Mutiny' recall prime Eric B. and Rakim jams."

AllMusic thought that "for a perfect example of the hip-hop slide—the notion that an artist's sophomore effort is vastly inferior to the debut—start here."

== Track listing ==
1. "Wake 'n' Bake"- 4:24
2. "Philly Blunts"- 4:04
3. "The Boom"- 3:47
4. "Lincoln Drive"- 4:16
5. "Butcher Countdown"- 0:57
6. "Mutiny"- 4:30
7. "Rumblefish"- 3:01
8. "Blind with Anger"- 3:49
9. "Revolution 94"- 8:24
10. "Times Runnin Up"- 2:50
11. "Idiot Business- 6:33
