= I'm Not Alone (album) =

Studio album by Keith Martin
- Released: March 14, 2005
- Genre: R&B
- Length: 60:00
- Label: EMI
- Producer: Chris Sy

Keith Martin chronology
Validated (2004)	I'm Not Alone (2005)	Let Me Take Control (2007)

I'm Not Alone is the fifth studio album by American recording artist Keith Martin. It was his second Filipino album and was released on 14 March 2005 by EMI.

The song "I Don't Wanna Think About It", written and produced by Shawn Stockman, was released as the album's first single. The song was previously recorded by Japanese singer Yuki Koyanagi on her album Intimacy. "Now and Forever" is a cover of the song by Richard Marx.

== Track listing ==
1. "Now and Forever" (Lyrics by: Richard Marx / Arranged by: Ferdie Marquez) – 3:54
2. "Here in Heaven" (Lyrics by: Keith Martin & Rocky Ramirez / Arranged by: Keith Martin) – 4:11
3. "I Don't Wanna Think About It" (Lyrics by: Shawn Stockman / Arranged by: Keith Martin) – 4:49
4. "I Will Love You" (Lyrics by: Keith Martin / Arranged by: Keith Martin) – 5:54
5. "Your Memory" (Lyrics by: Keith Martin & Diana Dayao / Arranged by: Keith Martin) – 5:12
6. "Why Can't It Be" (Lyrics by: Rannie Raymundo / Arranged by: Ferdie Marquez) – 4:02
7. "Find It All in Me" (Lyrics by: Keith Martin & Kawan Paul / Arranged by: Keith Martin) – 4:35
8. "Letting You Go" (Lyrics by: Keith Martin & Diana Dayao / Arranged by: Keith Martin) – 4:45
9. "Tell Me" (Lyrics by: Keith Martin / Arranged by: Keith Martin) – 5:52
10. "It's My Time" (Lyrics by: Keith Martin & Dennis Walters / Arranged by: Keith Martin) – 4:18
11. "My Song for You" (Lyrics by: Keith Martin / Arranged by: Keith Martin) – 4:34
12. "I'm Not Alone" (Lyrics by: Keith Martin & Kawan Paul / Arranged by: Keith Martin) – 3:46
13. "Tears I Cry for You" (Lyrics by: Keith Martin / Arranged by: Keith Martin) – 4:36

== Album credits ==
Executive Producer: Chris Sy
A&R Manager: Francis Guevarra
Sleeve Design: Willie A. Monzon
Sleeve Photography: Xander Angeles
Make-up & Grooming: Tonnette Chua

Background vocals on \"Find It All in Me\", Mike Luis & Keith Martin
Background vocals on \"Here in Heaven\", Melanie Enerva & Keith Martin
Acoustic Guitar on \"Here in Heaven\" Gereon Arcay
Keith Martin - Keyboards, bass guitar and drum programming, background vocals and arrangement

Recorded and mixed by: Keith Martin at Back Room Studio, Mandaluyong
\"Here in Heaven\" recorded at Pink Noice Studios, Quezon City and Back Room Studio, Mandaluyong
Masterez by Ferdie Marquez @ Freq Studio
