= Rucyl =

American artist and musician

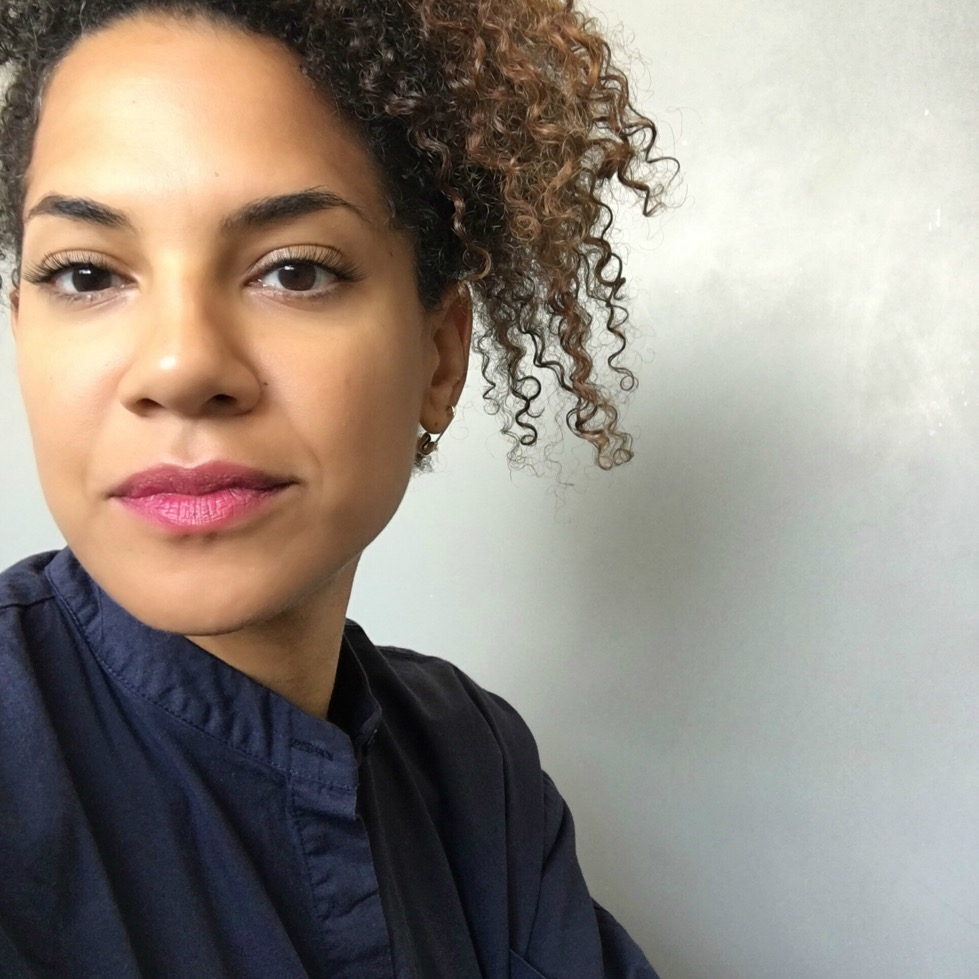
- Born: Rucyl Mills; Philadelphia, PA
- Style: sound art, experimental bass, avant R&B, music technology, interactive performance
- Website: http://rucyl.com

Rucyl is a new media and sound artist, singer, musician, and producer. Her interests involve experimentation and process as performance, time-based analog effects systems, and using sound to represent concepts that are non-tactile (time, natural forces, emotion, identity, and physics). Her earlier experimental works incorporated vocal improvisation and computer generated algorithmic music in tandem with generated visual projections, using Max MSP and VJ software. Rucyl improvises during her live performances using MIDI controllers, loopers, diy software and hardware, and effects processors.

== Biography ==
Rucyl was an original member of underground hip-hop group The Goats (Ruffhouse/Columbia Records) from 1992-1994. The Goats toured and performed internationally with bands like Bad Brains, Fishbone, and The Beastie Boys.

Her first interactive pieces included the Chakakhantroller, a wearable interface MIDI controller for audio and visual performance, and installation Watch What You Are, in collaboration with Justin Downs, which was featured as part of Eyebeam Interactive Art Gallery's "Double Take" exhibition in July 2008.

Rucyl co-founded Saturn Never Sleeps (SNS), a futuretronic label and audiovisual group created during the resurgence of the contemporary Afrofuturism movement, with DJ/producer King Britt. Saturn Never Sleeps was founded on the principles of process as performance, inspired greatly by the media and music of the great experimental jazz musician, Sun Ra. These collaborative, audiovisual live performances were featured at The Institute of Contemporary Art, Philadelphia, Painted Bride Art Center, The River To River Festival at the World Financial Center in New York City, Art Basel in Miami, and Moogfest in Asheville, NC. Rucyl traveled internationally with SNS to Istanbul, Berlin, Madrid, Switzerland (Stadtmusik Festival) and Tokyo (Micro-cosmos). Curated performances in Philadelphia and Brooklyn included artists Taylor McFerrin, Ras G, Sarah White, Teebs, Ben Neill, Flying Lotus, Stef Eye, Shabazz Palaces, and Tokimonsta. In June 2010, the Leeway Foundation featured Rucyl on a "Women in Indie Music" panel where she discussed the re-emerging lo-fi/DIY aesthetic in music, digital distribution and the place of activism within her art. In spring 2011, Saturn Never Sleeps opened for TV on the Radio, and appeared with the Sun Ra Arkestra at Eyebeam's event "Past Futures." SNS released a series of works and podcasts from under-the-radar POC artists from 2009-2011. SNS's full-length album, Yesterday's Machine, was released in summer 2011.

After SNS disbanded in 2011, Rucyl continued with collaborative performances highlighting POC women and artists of the experimental electronic genre under the moniker Woman + Machine. She is a 2025 Hermitage Greenfield Prize Fellow and a 2025 Simons Foundation Art & Science Open Interval Winner. She has a special interest in frontier technologies and often embeds data research and algorithms into her sound compositions.

She currently resides in Brooklyn, NY.

== Discography ==
- Caveat, 2016
- Uma Kanya, 2011
- Yesterday's Machine, 2011
- Sarah White - I Wanna Be With You (Rucyl Bass Mix), 2009
- Ursula Rucker - Ruckus Soundsysdom at Discogs, 2008
- The Goats - Outtakes Of The Goats at Discogs, 2007
- Olu Dara - Neighborhoods at Discogs, 2001
- The Goats - ¿Do The Digs Dug? at Discogs, 1993
- The Goats - Tricks Of The Shade at Discogs, 1992
- Full Rucyl discography at Discogs
- http://rucyl.bandcamp.com
- http://soundcloud.com/rucyl

== Education ==
M.P.S., Interaction Design - ITP, Tisch at NYU, NYC, Dean’s Fellowship, 2008

B.S., New Media - New School University, NYC, 2006

The New School Jazz Program, NYC, 1996-1997

== Residencies ==
Organizmo Design Center Residency 2016, Bogotá, Colombia

Artist U Residency via Creative Capital 2011, Philadelphia, Pennsylvania

Painted Bride Art Center 2009 (with Saturn Never Sleeps), Philadelphia, Pennsylvania

Hardware for Hacking: Eyebeam Art & Technology Residency 2008, New York City, New York
