= I Think I'm Gonna Be Sick =

Studio album by Dandelion
- Released: 1993
- Recorded: 1992
- Studios: Studio 4, New York City, New York
- Genre: Rock
- Length: 52:18
- Labels: Columbia, Ruffhouse
- Producers: David M. Johnson, Dandelion

Dandelion chronology
| Silver (1990) | I Think I'm Gonna Be Sick (1993) | Dyslexicon (1995) |

I Think I'm Gonna Be Sick is the debut album by the Philadelphia band Dandelion. The album includes an untitled hidden track, which band member Mike Morpurgo has referred to as "Tuesday". A European tour followed shortly after the album was released. "Under My Skin" was released as a single and appeared on the soundtrack to Brainscan.

== Critical reception ==
The Washington Post said that "many of the album's songs are pithy rockers that recall both the elementary attack and the adolescent attitude of the Stooges." The Philadelphia Inquirer wrote: "On the masterfully developed 'Onion Field', ominous sustained-guitar sounds establish the framework, while vocalist Kevin issues attitude-heavy pronouncements that energize the rhythm section."

== Track listing ==
1. "Waiting for a Ride" (4:07)
2. "Under My Skin" (2:55)
3. "Nothing to Say" (3:03)
4. "Outside" (3:20)
5. "Onion Field" (6:02)
6. "Diggin' a Hole" (2:19)
7. "Thorn" (3:54)
8. "Play That Song" (3:12)
9. "I Can Remember" (4:53)
10. "In My Room" (5:20)
11. "Weight of the World"/untitled hidden track (13:15)
