= Love of My Life (album) =

Studio album by Keith Martin
- Released: March 22, 2004
- Genre: R&B
- Label: EMI
- Producers: Chris Sy, Ramon Chuaying

Keith Martin chronology
All the Hits (2003)	Love of My Life (2004)	Validated (2004)

Love of My Life is an album by Keith Martin, released on 22 March 2004 by EMI. It is his third album, and first album produced in the Philippines. The songs "Because of You", "Love of My Life" and "Coming Home" were released as singles.

== Track listing ==
1. "Because of You" (acoustic version)
2. "Coming Home"
3. "Whateva' You Need"
4. "Love of My Life"
5. "Love Doesn't Care"
6. "Silly Heart"
7. "I'm Sorry"
8. "Can We Go Back"
9. "Can't Get Over You"
10. "Only One"
11. "To You, Oh Lord"
12. "I Can't Bear"
13. "Because of You" (original version)
14. "Closer I Get to You" (feat. Noah) (bonus track)
15. "Boyz II Men Medley" (feat. Mark Laygo & Christian Puerto) (bonus track)
16. "Because of You" (VCD)
17. "Closer I Get to You" (feat. Noah) (VCD)
18. "Boyz II Men Medley" (feat. Mark Laygo & Christian Puerto) (VCD)

== Album credits ==
Executive producer: Chris Sy, Ramon Chuaying
Album Producer: Keith Martin, Greg Gali-Rivera

== "Because of You" cover versions ==
The popular hit song "Because of You" has been covered by at least ten Filipino artists, including Jolina Magdangal, Kyla, Gary Valenciano, Jed Madela, Martin Nievera, and Guji Lorenzana (in a Tagalog version titled "Dahil Sa Iyo").
