= Am I Black Enough for You? (album) =

Studio album by Schoolly D
- Released: July 27, 1989
- Recorded: 1989
- Genres: Hardcore hip hop; political hip hop; East Coast hip hop
- Length: 53:41
- Label: Jive/RCA
- Producers: Schoolly D, DJ Code Money

Schoolly D chronology
| Smoke Some Kill (1988) | Am I Black Enough for You? (1989) | How a Black Man Feels (1991) |

Singles from Am I Black Enough for You?
- 1. "Livin' in the Jungle / Gucci Again" Released: 1989; 2. "Pussy Ain't Nothin'" Released: 1989

Am I Black Enough for You? is the fourth album by rapper Schoolly D, released in 1989 via Jive Records/RCA. It was produced by Schoolly D and DJ Code Money. The album did not chart, although three singles were released: "Gangster Boogie", "Pussy Ain't Nothin'", and "Livin' in the Jungle", which featured a music video directed by Rich Murray. It was Schoolly D's last album for Jive Records.

"Am I Black Enough for You?" appears in the 1990 film King of New York.

== Critical reception ==
Professional ratings
Review scores
| Source | Rating |
|---|---|
| AllMusic | 3/5 stars |
| Robert Christgau | B |
| The Encyclopedia of Popular Music | 4/5 stars |
| The Rolling Stone Album Guide | 2/5 stars |
| Spin Alternative Record Guide | 7/10 |

Trouser Press called Am I Black Enough for You? "a loud and proud album that uses spoken-word bites (political speeches, Star Trek dialogue, Richard Pryor crack-horror routines) to increase the consciousness." The Washington Post wrote that "the raised consciousness and subtler production only make this the rapper's least distinctive effort: There's nothing on this one as abrasively hilarious, or as indubitably Schooly [sic], as the previous platter's 'No More Rock and Roll.'"

== Track listing ==
1. "Black" – 0:29
2. "Gangster Boogie" – 4:06
3. "It's Like Dope" – 3:46
4. "D. Is For" – 3:47
5. "Black Is..." – 0:30
6. "Gucci Again" – 3:42
7. "Pussy Ain't Nothin'" – 3:04
8. "Black Attack" – 0:40
9. "Who's Schoolin' Who?" – 3:17
10. "Mama Feelgood" – 3:30
11. "Get off Your Ass and Get Involved" – 1:53
12. "Education of a Black Man" – 2:29
13. "Black Education" – 1:03
14. "Livin' in the Jungle" – 3:34
15. "Black Jesus" – 3:50
16. "Super Nigger" – 1:53
17. "Am I Black Enough for You?" – 4:24
18. "Don't Call Me Nigger" – 3:36
19. "Black Power" – 1:03
20. "Godfather of Funk" – 3:05
