= Smoke Some Kill =

Studio album by Schoolly D
- Released: 1988
- Recorded: 1988
- Genres: East Coast hip hop; hardcore hip hop
- Label: Jive/RCA
- Producer: Schoolly D

Schoolly D chronology
| Saturday Night! – The Album (1986) | Smoke Some Kill (1988) | Am I Black Enough for You? (1989) |

Singles from Smoke Some Kill
- 1. "Smoke Some Kill" Released: 1988; 2. "No More Rock n' Roll" Released: 1988

Smoke Some Kill is the third album by rapper Schoolly D. The album was released in 1988 on Jive Records and was produced by Schoolly D.

== Release ==
Though the album was not as successful as Saturday Night! – The Album, it made it to No. 180 on the Billboard 200 and No. 50 on the Top R&B/Hip-Hop album chart.

== "Signifying Rapper" ==
The song "Signifying Rapper" was based upon the "signifying monkey" character of African-American folklore. A version of this story was performed by Rudy Ray Moore. Schoolly D's adaptation of the story is recited over the rhythm guitar figure from Led Zeppelin's "Kashmir". The song was featured in the film Bad Lieutenant, and inspired the title of (and is discussed in) the book Signifying Rappers: Rap and Race in the Urban Present.

"Signifying Rapper" was the target of several lawsuits following its use in the 1992 film Bad Lieutenant, in multiple scenes.

In 1994, Live Home Video and distributor Aries Film Releasing were ordered to destroy any unsold copies of Bad Lieutenant as part of a copyright infringement ruling. Director Abel Ferrara was angered by the incident, which he felt "ruined the movie":

"Signifying Rapper" was out for five years, and there wasn't a problem. Then the film had already been out for two years and they start bitching about it. [...] It cost Schoolly like $50,000. It was a nightmare. And meanwhile, "Signifying Rapper" is 50 million times better than "Kashmir" ever thought of being. [...] Why sue? You should be happy that somebody is paying homage to your work.

— Abel Ferrara, The A.V. Club interview

== Critical reception ==
Professional ratings
Review scores
| Source | Rating |
|---|---|
| AllMusic | 2/5 stars |
| Robert Christgau | B− |
| Los Angeles Daily News | B |
| Rolling Stone | 1/5 stars |

The album received generally mixed reviews from most music critics. The Los Angeles Daily News gave the album a B. Rolling Stone reviewer Cary Darling panned the album, writing "With its images of gun-toting bluster, mushrooming genitals and rampant drug use – backed by thuddingly dull beats – Smoke Some Kill should be played for every prospective rapper so he'll know what not to do." AllMusic reviewer Ron Wynn called the album "more chaotic than creative". In his consumer guide for The Village Voice, critic Robert Christgau called Schoolly D "the white audience's paranoid-to-masochistic fantasy of a B-boy" and commended him for "realizing the fantasy so scarily, and for commanding his own tough-guy sound".

== Track listing ==
Schoolly D "Signifying Rapper" (1988)
Excerpt of main riff and break

1. "Smoke Some Kill" – 3:28
2. "Here We Go Again" – 2:43
3. "Mr.Big Dick" – 4:36
4. "Gangster Boogie II" – 3:43
5. "This Is It (Ain't Gonna Rain)" – 3:56
6. "Another Poem" – 4:20
7. "We Don't Rock, We Rap" – 3:17
8. "Signifying Rapper" – 4:51
9. "No More Rock n' Roll" – 3:52
10. "Same White Bitch (Got You Strung Out on Cane)" – 4:19
11. "Treacherous" – 4:27
12. "Black Man" – 4:19
13. "Coqui 900" – 3:30
14. "Fat Gold Chain" – 3:01

== Personnel ==
- Schoolly D – producer
- DJ Code Money – sampling, scratching
- Joe "The Butcher" Nicolo – engineer, mix on "Mr. Big Dick", "Gangster Boogie II", "This Is It (Ain't Gonna Rain)", "Another Poem", "Same White Bitch (Got You Strung Out on Cane)", "Treacherous", "Black Man"
- Nigel Green – mix on "Smoke Some Kill", "Here We Go Again", "We Don't Rock, We Rap", "Signifying Rapper", "No More Rock n' Roll", "Coqui 900", "Fat Gold Chain"
- Andy "Funky Drummer" Kravitz – drums on "Signifying Rapper" and "No More Rock n' Roll"
- Mike Tyler – guitar on "Signifying Rapper" and "No More Rock n' Roll"
- Doug Grigsby – bass on "Signifying Rapper" and "No More Rock n' Roll"
- Big Tim – bass on "Another Poem"
