= Let Me Take Control =

Studio album by Keith Martin
- Released: August 13, 2007
- Recorded: 2006–2007
- Genre: R&B
- Length: 40 minutes
- Label: Galaxy Music
- Producer: Ramon Chuaying, William Lim

Keith Martin chronology
I'm Not Alone (2005)	Let Me Take Control (2007)

Let Me Take Control is an album by Keith Martin, released on 13 August 2007. It is his sixth overall album, and third album produced in the Philippines. The song "Lady", a cover of the Kenny Rogers song, was released as its first single. The album contains two other covers, of the Carpenters' "We've Only Just Begun" and Kenny Loggins' "Forever".

== Track listing ==
1. "Lady" (Lyrics by: Lionel Richie) – 4:32
2. "Overloved" (Lyrics by: Keith Martin and Diana S. Dayao) – 5:33
3. "We've Only Just Begun" (Lyrics by: Paul Williams and Roger Nichols) – 3:16
4. "My Dream" (Lyrics by: Keith Martin) – 5:02
5. "Compromise" (Lyrics by: Courtney McBride and Keith Martin) – 4:30
6. "Forever" (Lyrics by: Kenny Loggins, David Foster and Eva Ein) – 4:51
7. "Happy That You're Mine" (Lyrics by: Keith Martin) – 3:54
8. "Let Me Take Control" (Lyrics by: Keith Martin and Kowan Paul) – 3:57
9. "Because of You" (Live Acoustic) (Lyrics by: Keith Martin) – 4:08

== Credits ==
- Executive Producers: Ramon Chuaying and William Lim
- All songs mixed and mastered by: Keith Martin
- Overall creative and musical supervision by: Keith Martin
- A&R Supervision: Mike Monsod
- Photography: Xander Angeles
- Cover Concept, Lay-out and Design: Keith Martin/Josef Laureano
