= Jimmy Luxury =

American hip hop group

- Also known as: Jimmy Luxury and the Tommy Rome Orchestra
- Origin: Philadelphia and San Francisco, U.S.
- Genres: Hip hop, swing revival
- Label: Sony
- Website: jimmyluxury.com

Jimmy Luxury, also known as Jimmy Luxury and the Tommy Rome Orchestra, is a swing-hop duo with its two main members based in Philadelphia and San Francisco. The group features vocalists Jimmy Luxury (James Kelleher), Brett "Songbird" Abramson, Rucyl Mills and producer/singer Tommy Rome (James D’Angelo, formerly known as Oatie Kato of The Goats).

The group pioneered a new style of music that involves rapping over music of the 1950s. The vocalist has been described as a cross between Frank Sinatra and Flavor Flav. Jimmy Luxury has released three albums. The first was released in 1999 as both A Night in the Arms of... and My True Love is.... The second album, Hotels, Limousines and Lawn Chairs, was released in 2002. Their third album, The Music Comes from Rome, is an instrumental and was released in 2007. The group has songs featured in the films Me, Myself & Irene, Go and Ocean's Eleven although the songs only appear on the Go soundtrack. "Cha Cha Cha" appears frequently in national television commercials, including adverts by Chevrolet and Corona. Two of their songs ("Volare" and "Kick in the Head") from their initial release were removed due to sample clearance issues. Sony produced videos for "I Love Life", and "Cha Cha Cha".

The band has performed shows with The Cure, Iggy Pop, Run-DMC, Blondie, and No Doubt.
