= King Britt =

American DJ, producer and educator

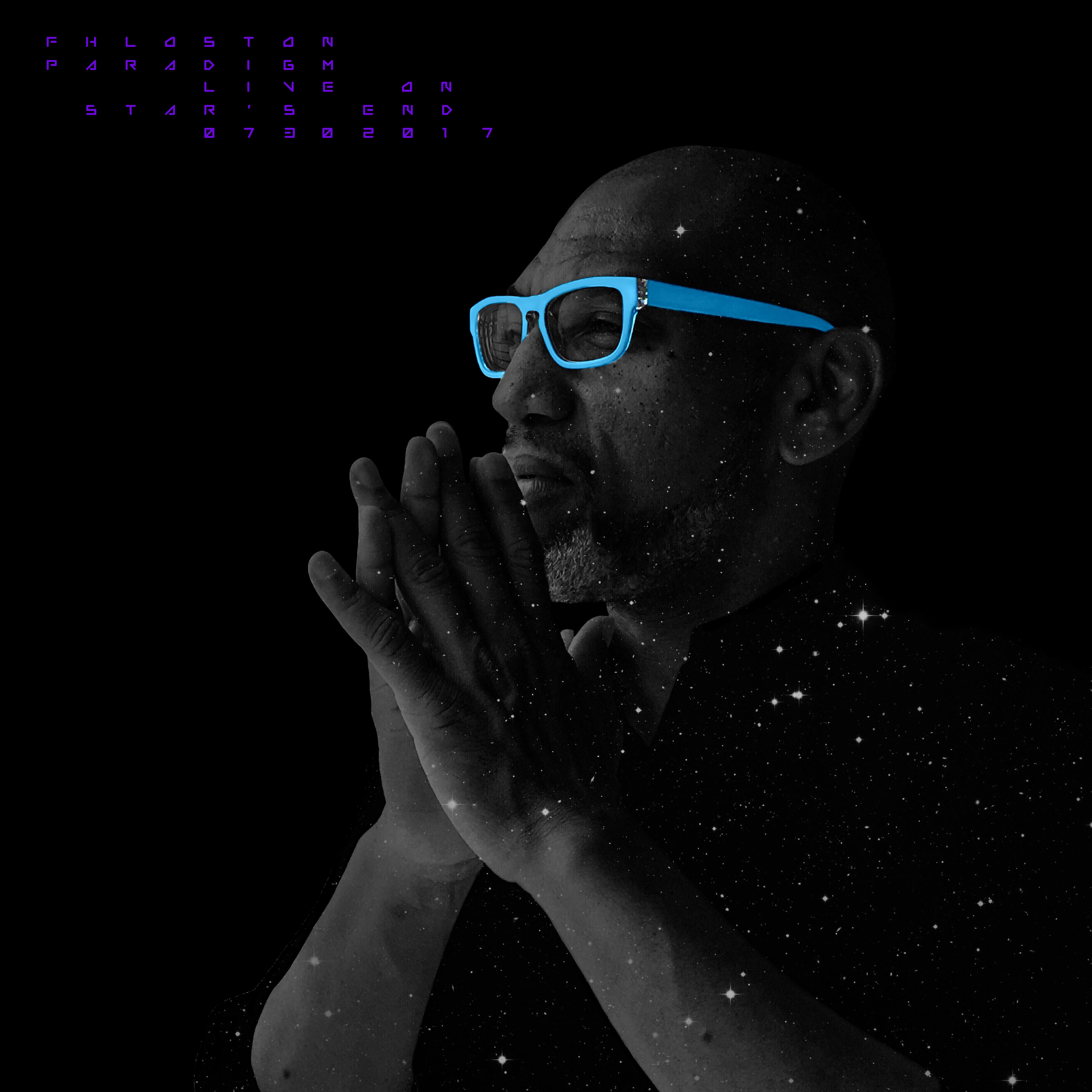
- King Britt by Olinda Del Mar

Background information
- Also known as: Fhloston Paradigm, Sylk130, Scuba, The Nova Dream Sequence
- Born: 1968 (age 57–58)
- Origin: Philadelphia, Pennsylvania, U.S.
- Genres: Electronic; trip hop; broken beat
- Occupations: DJ, producer, professor
- Years active: 1988–present
- Label: Barely Breaking Even
- Website: kingbritt.com

King Britt (born 1968) is an American record producer, composer, performer, educator and DJ from Philadelphia. Britt is known for his eclectic mix of electronic, house, disco, techno, rave, experimental music, and other genres across his projects. He is also a Professor in Computer Music at University of California San Diego, with a research focus of Afrofuturism in music and the pioneering role of people of color in electronic music.

King Britt was the original DJ for Digable Planets and toured with the group 1992-1994. He has released music as leader of the project Sylk 130 and as Fhloston Paradigm, Scuba, and The Nova Dream Sequence. As a composer and producer, Britt has collaborated with artists including De La Soul, Madlib, Kathy Sledge, and director Michael Mann. He has remixed for musicians Tori Amos, Miles Davis, Saul Williams, Meredith Monk, Solange, Calvin Harris, and Dua Lipa.

== Biography ==
Britt is a 1986 graduate of Central High School in Philadelphia, Pennsylvania. In 1987, he started working at Tower Records, as a buyer for the singles/import section. His extensive knowledge of dance music made him an in demand buyer in the company. He went on to make many connections in the music community, bringing in records and new labels from all over the world. King attended Temple University.

In 1990, King Britt began his first DJ residency at the Silk City in Philadelphia and the now defunct Revival. In collaboration with music partner Josh Wink, King also produced his first commercial release "Tribal Confusion" on dance label Strictly Rhythm. Their musical partnership continued until 2001.

In 1992, he toured with started touring worldwide for the group Digable Planets for the Digable Planets World Tour. He toured again with the band 1993-1994 two years with including a three-month opening slot with Sade. Britt also performed at the 1993 Grammy Awards with Digable Planets, the year Digable Planets won the Grammy Award for Best Rap Performance by a Duo or Group.

In 1994, Britt and Josh Wink started the label Ovum Recordings. Their first release was a collaboration between King and spoken word artist Ursula Rucker, called "Supernatural". The song became a staple tune in the US rave scene and is revered as a classic in many countries. Ovum Recordings is still in operation but King resigned from his position in 2001. Ovum signed with Sony in 1996 as part of a deal through Philadelphia label, Ruffhouse Records. Ovum established was the first label in Sony’s Electronic Music Division. Britt and Wink served as CEOs of Ovum, and Ovum released 6 albums and numerous single releases under Sony, including the Josh Wink album, Hear Here. Ovum departed from Sony in 2002.

In early 1998, under Sylk130, King released the neo soul album When the Funk Hits the Fan on Ovum/Columbia Records. This album went to sell over 500,000 copies worldwide and was scheduled to be re-released in 2012 as part of a box set collection for Sylk130. In a favorable review of the 1998 album When the Funk Hits the Fan, Billboard compared his sound to Soul II Soul and De La Soul.

In 2001, Britt released Sylk130 Re-Member's Only, which features Alison Moyet, Martin Fry from ABC, Kathy Sledge, Grover Washington Jr, De La Soul and others. It was his last album for Ovum Recordings and Columbia Records as he began to pursue doing more production work.

Britt released Adventures in Lo Fi on London's BBE label in 2003. Guests on the album included Madlib as Quasimoto, De La Soul, Dice Raw, Ivana Santilli and Butterfly from Digable Planets. He produced King Britt Presents: Sister Gertrude Morgan in 2005. A recreation of self-proclaimed bride of christ, Sister Gertrude's original Preservation Hall album gets new life. The record was included in the Michael Mann's 2006 film Miami Vice, on the AdBusters compilation, Live Without Dead Time and the HBO television show True Blood. Still continuing to DJ/produce, King changed his direction and began focusing on techno music and in 2006 released Interpretation under the moniker The Nova Dream Sequence. Released on Munich based label Compost, this record was praised by Derrick May and Carl Craig, including many of the songs in their sets. May also contributed to the liner notes.

Britt won the Pew Fellowship in the Arts for composition in 2007.

Britt and multimedia artists Rucyl started the project 'Saturn Never Sleeps' in 2009. It is an electronic improvisational group as well as a label. They curated a musical event for the Institute of Contemporary Art in Philadelphia to coincide with a Sun Ra touring exhibit, and continued the project as residents at The Painted Bride Art Center in Philadelphia. Saturn Never Sleeps went on to become a band, label and is curated monthly in Philadelphia.

Intricate Beauty by Britt was released in 2010 on Nervous Recordings. Special guests included Lady Alma, RYAT and Astrid Suryanto, who sings on the club hit "Now". Tim Conley a.k.a. MAST played guitar on the title track "Intricate Beauty". Britt also produced for Canadian rock stars Bedouin Soundclash on the album Light the Horizon.

Britt has remixed for musicians Tori Amos, Miles Davis, Saul Williams and Meredith Monk and Wendy & Lisa.

In 2014, he produced The Phoenix by Fhloston Paradigm for the Hyperdub label. 2016 brought two album projects, Donna by Cassy and Pendulous Moon by the German singer, Clara Hill.

In 2017, Britt’s project Fhloston Paradigm released the album After... It featured guest appearances by Nosaj Thing, Ryat, Jacqueline Constance, Moor Mother, Pia Ercole, Stephanie Yu, Alexa Barchini, Kate Faust, Petra, Puerto Rican Space Program and Tim Motzer. In 2017, he also contributed to Gonjasufi's album Mandela Effect.

In 2022, Britt organised the Blacktronika: Now Is The Time Festival at the Museum of Modern Art (MOCA) in Los Angeles. The event featured artists including 700Bliss (Moor Mother / DJ Haram), Xenia Rubinos, Suzi Analogue, Chimurenga Renaissance and amongst others.

In 2025, Britt was named the MacArthur Foundation Endowed Chair in Digital Media and Learning.

== Curatorial ==
- Moondance: A Night in the Afrofuture, MoMA PS1, Guest Music Curator, 2014.
- The Divine Feminine, FringeArts, Philadelphia, curated by King Britt and Kate Watson-Wallace, February 6
- Blacktronika: Now is the Time Festival, The Geffen Contemporary at Museum of Contemporary Art, Los Angeles, October 30, 2022
- Afrofuturism Festival, Carnegie Hall, February-March, 2022.

== Discography ==
=== Albums and production ===
- 1998: When the Funk Hits the Fan
- 2001: Re-Members Only
- 2002: The Philadelphia Experiment Remixed
- 2002: Hidden Treasures by Scuba
- 2002: Black to the Future
- 2002: Cosmoafrique by ObaFunke
- 2003: Adventures in Lo-Fi (BBE Records)
- 2005: Late Night with King Britt
- 2005: King Britt Presents: Sister Gertrude Morgan
- 2006: Nova Dream Sequence: Interpretations
- 2007: Cosmic Lounge
- 2007: This Is King Britt
- 2009: Deep and Sexy 4
- 2010: The Intricate Beauty
- 2011: Yesterday's Machine by Saturn Never Sleeps
- 2014: The Phoenix by Fhloston Paradigm
- 2015: Cosmosis #1 by Fhloston Paradigm
- 2015: Cosmosis #2 by Fhloston Paradigm
- 2016: Pendulous Moon by Clara Hill
- 2016: Donna by Cassy
- 2016: What Happened Was...
- 2017: After... by Fhloston Paradigm
