= Keith Martin (musician) =

American R&B singer-songwriter (1966–2022)

- Born: Keith Eric Martin; September 22, 1966; Washington, D.C., U.S.
- Died: March 25, 2022 (aged 55) (date found) Quezon City, Philippines
- Genres: R&B
- Occupations: Singer-songwriter, producer
- Instruments: Vocals, keyboards, bass guitar, drums, percussion
- Years active: 1995–2022
- Labels: Sony, Ruffhouse, Orchard, EMI/PolyEast, Galaxy Music, Rhyme Scene

Keith Eric Martin (September 22, 1966 – March 25, 2022) was an American R&B singer-songwriter and record producer. He was best known for writing and singing romantic love songs.

== Career ==
=== Early years ===
Martin was the second son of three children. Growing up, he listened to the Jackson 5, Prince and the production of Jimmy Jam and Terry Lewis, and Stevie Wonder. He was also influenced by jazz and gospel music. Martin started playing piano, bass guitar, drums and singing when he was 10. He started writing music when he was nineteen.

Martin was a force among local artists in the late 1980s, growing up with close friends Johnny Gill and Stacy Lattisaw and bassist Oteil Burbridge and Kenny Lattimore. He was a member of the group, Masquerade, which included twins, Art and Scott Powell, Sharif Walters and D'Extra Wiley, who later became a member of the 1990s new jack R&B group II D Extreme.

Con Funk Shun founder and drummer Louis A. McCall, Sr. signed Martin to his Gaithersburg, MD artist management company he owned with his wife Linda Lou McCall, a music business consultant and songwriter. Linda Lou McCall was hired by MC Hammer in 1990 to help set up his corporate operations and administration in Oakland, California. When she became Vice President of Hammer's artist management company, Linda and her husband arranged for Martin to come to California and got him on as part of MC Hammer's Please Hammer, Don't Hurt 'Em and Too Legit to Quit world tours.

When the McCalls relocated to Los Angeles in 1990, Martin followed, enabling him to work with Boyz II Men producers (Shovani and Buster), Grammy Award winning songwriters and producers Marti Sharron and Danny Sembello, Oji Pierce, Ian Prince and The Time's Jesse Johnson.

=== First album ===
Michael McCary of Boyz II Men, brought Martin to Ruffhouse/Columbia Sony. Martin was signed to Columbia Ruffhouse Records by his then manager, Adrian Taylor, who had previously managed Martin when he was the lead singer of Masquerade. The group included members Scott and Art Powell and Sharif Walters. Washington, D.C. promoter James T. (Time 2 Jamm) brought the group to Night Flight studios, owned by singer/recording artist Stacy Lattisaw and her husband Kevin Jackson. The group was popular in Washington DC. Martin's friend, R&B recording star Johnny Gill, also supported the fledgling band. Later, Charlie Singleton, member of the hit pop/R&B band Cameo, produced demos for the group, which allowed Martin to record songs in Atlanta, Georgia. David Franklin, Richard Pryor's manager at the time, worked with Adrian Taylor on arranging recording sessions. The demos were presented to Epic Records, however, Kenny Lattimore's group, Maniquin was signed instead of the band Masquerade.

Ruffhouse president Chris Schwartz, Inerge Barrett and attorney Kevon Glickmon were all present at the 1994 signing of Martin in Philadelphia, PA. The budget for the first album was $350,000. The budget was approved by Columbia Records President, Donny Ienner. Songwriter Marti Sharron and Danny Sembello, brother of Michael Sembello, wrote the track "Never Find Someone Like You". The song was also placed on the Bad Boys movie soundtrack and went on to sell over 1 million copies.

Martin released his first album, It's Long Overdue in 1995, which peaked at No. 82 on the US Billboard R&B Albums chart. His first single, "Never Find Someone Like You" (which was also independently recorded by Backstreet Boys before) peaked at No. 53 on the Billboard Hot 100 and at No. 43 on the R&B Singles chart, and was included in the platinum-selling Bad Boys soundtrack. The album's second single, "Moment in Time" reached No. 103 on the R&B Singles chart.

For the next decade, Martin stayed busy in the music industry producing, writing and releasing several solo albums, gaining him a large fan base throughout the world. His ballad, "Because of You", is still a major favorite in the US and Asia.

=== Move to the Philippines ===
In 2004, Martin came to the attention of EMI Philippines, who hired him as an in-house producer in Manila, producing and writing for artists in the Philippines and Indonesia. He collaborated with Filipino singer Kyla on her albums Not Your Ordinary Girl and Beautiful Days, with Gloc-9 on his album Ako Si…, with Agnes Monica on her album Whaddup A.. '?!, and with Gary V., among others.

=== 2009–2019 ===
In 2009, Martin returned from the Philippines and worked with POSH, an all-girl group signed to Viva Records. Martin produced "Missing You", one of the singles off their album My Heart.

In 2010, Martin released a new album This Road including the song "You Are My Life", which was released as a single in 2012 and became a popular wedding theme.

In 2011, Martin wrote and produced two songs for Australian recording artist Ron Kingston. The first song was a duet called "My Friend" which features Kingston and Indonesian singer Mia. The Disney inspired and animated music video was completed by Empire Films in Australia and released to the public in September 2011. Martin recorded duets with Indonesian artists Marybeth and Dira Sugandi Zulham and Singaporean artist Shun Ng.

In 2013, Martin released another album, The Vision, available as digital download only.

In 2018, Martin released a new single, "Return to Me", available in all the digital platforms and as an official videoclip on YouTube.

=== Death ===
On March 25, 2022, Martin was found dead in his private residence in Quezon City, Philippines, after neighbors had alerted the condominium's manager. The exact date of his death has yet to be confirmed, although reports had stated that Martin had been dead for a week before he was found. His last public appearance was at the wedding of Daryl Ong and Dea Formilleza on March 12. He was 55. His death was determined to be caused by acute myocardial infarction.

== Discography ==
=== Albums ===
- 1995: It's Long Overdue (US album)
- 2003: All the Hits (US album)
- 2004: Love of My Life (Filipino album)
- 2004: Validated (US album)
- 2005: I'm Not Alone (Filipino album)
- 2007: Let Me Take Control (Filipino album)
- 2010: This Road (Filipino album)
- 2013: The Vision (Filipino album)

=== Singles ===
- 1995: "Never Find Someone Like You"
- 1995: "Moment in Time"
- 2004: "Because of You"
- 2004: "Love of My Life"
- 2004: "Coming Home"
- 2004: "Whateva U Need"
- 2005: "I Don't Wanna Think About It"
- 2007: "Lady"
- 2009: "California 1"
- 2012: "You Are My Life"
- 2018: "Return to Me"
