= Lady B =

American rapper

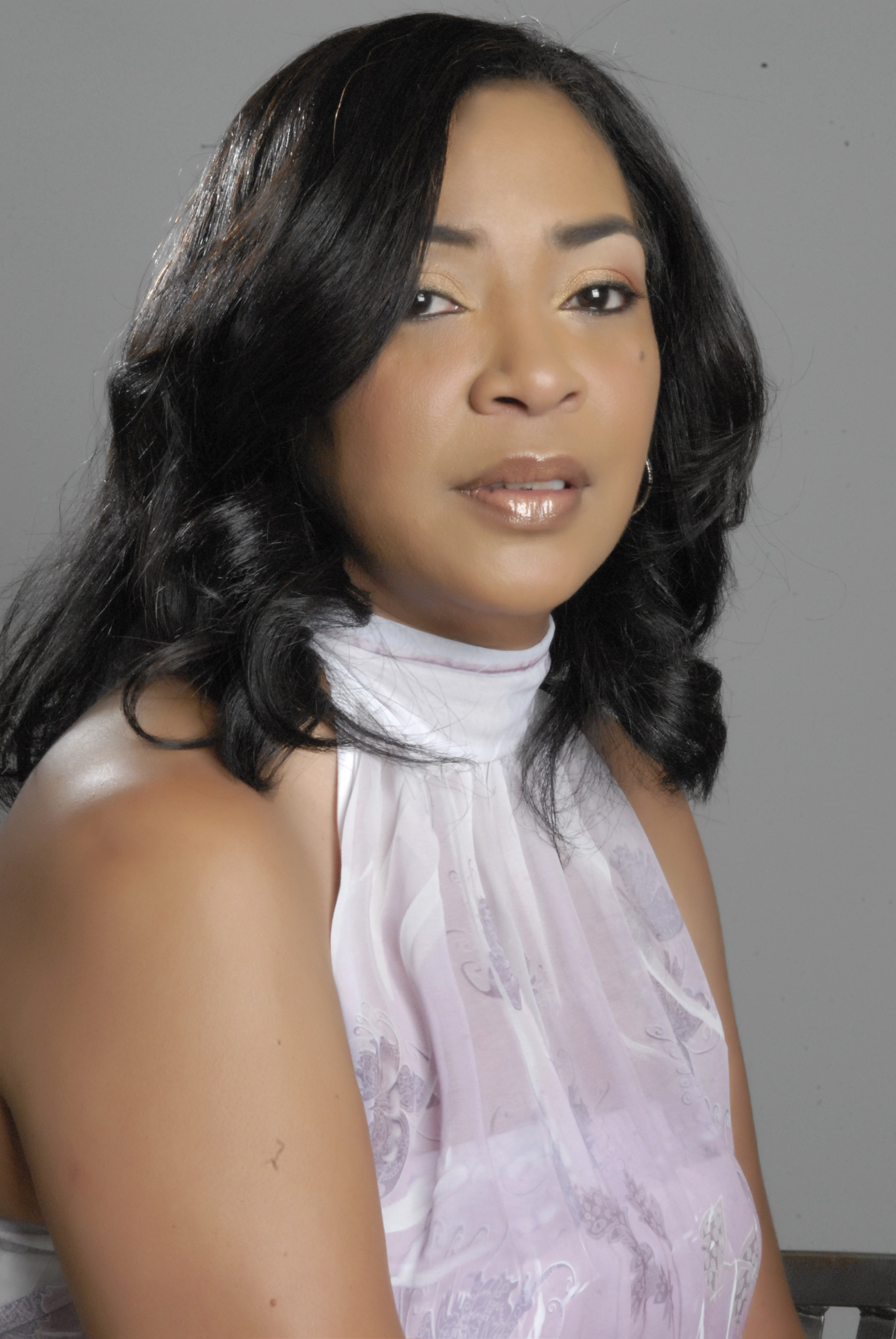

Background information
- Also known as: Bahiyyah Clark
- Born: Wendy Clark
- Origin: Philadelphia, Pennsylvania
- Genres: Hip hop
- Occupation: Radio DJ

Bahiyyah Clark, born Wendy Clark (c. 1962), better known by her stage name Lady B, is an American radio DJ and rapper from Philadelphia, Pennsylvania. She is one of the earliest female rappers in hip hop, and the first female hip hop artist to record a single, "To the Beat, Y'all", in 1979. Clark's rise and long influence in the genre earned her the title as "Godmother of Hip Hop". She was one of the first DJs to play rap records on the radio outside New York, playing artists such as Will Smith, Run-DMC, Queen Latifah, LL Cool J, and Public Enemy at the start of their careers.

== Career ==
Clark was born in Wynnefield, Philadelphia and attended Overbrook High School along with actor Will Smith. In her late teens, she began going by her Islamic name, Bahiyyah. At one point, Clark was dating the Philadelphia 76ers basketball star World B. Free, with whom she was freestyling during a trip to New York City after encountering the rap scene and "Rapper's Delight" for the first time. Mimicking the style back in Philadelphia, Clark was discovered by a local radio personality who persuaded her to record her first song, "To the Beat Y'all".

Her career started with radio station WHAT in 1979, and later that year, Clark recorded "To the Beat Y'all." The song, the title of which became a stock rap phrase, was first released by TEC, a local Philadelphia-based record label, and released again in 1980 by Sylvia Robinson's rap label, Sugar Hill Records.

In 1979, Mary Mason on WRNB 100.3 gave Lady B her own weekend show, which transformed into a success and brought hip-hop to the radio in Philly. In 1984, Lady B moved to Philadelphia's Power 99 FM and started The Street Beat program, which blew the radio station's ratings through the roof. She ran this program until 1989. She later broadcast for Sirius Satellite Radio in New York City. She also worked for WRNB 100.3 in Philadelphia until she was dismissed in December 2017.

Lady B joined the on-air lineup at Classix 107.9 on February 11, 2019, a role she continues to serve as of 2024.

== Awards and recognitions ==
Lady B has received numerous awards throughout her career. In 2002, she received the "Philly Urban Legend Award," which acknowledges pioneers in Philadelphia's rap music scene, The World Renowned Entertainment, Role Model of Excellence Award, two Lifetime Achievement Awards (including the Douglass ”Jocko” Henderson award). She is also listed in Vibe magazine's History of Hip-Hop as “maybe the most influential female in hip-hop radio history”.

On August 13, 2022, the city of Philadelphia renamed the 5700 block of Wyndale Avenue “Lady B Way” in recognition of her accomplishments.

=== See also ===
- Sha-Rock
