= It's Long Overdue =

Studio album by Keith Martin
- Released: April 18, 1995
- Recorded: 1994–1995
- Genre: R&B
- Length: 60:04
- Label: Sony; Ruffhouse
- Producer: Various

Keith Martin chronology
It's Long Overdue (1995)	All the Hits (2003)

It's Long Overdue is the debut album by Keith Martin, released on 18 April 1995 by Sony and Ruffhouse, which peaked at number 82 on the Billboard Top R&B/Hip-Hop Albums chart. The song "Never Find Someone Like You" was released as the album's first single and peaked at number 53 on the Billboard Hot 100 and at number 43 on the Hot R&B/Hip-Hop Songs chart. "Moment in Time" was released as the second single. "Never Find Someone Like You" was included on the Bad Boys soundtrack. This song was also independently recorded by the Backstreet Boys beforehand, which was to be included on their debut album, but was replaced with "I'll Never Break Your Heart" and was not released until 1997 when it was included as a B-side of the single "Anywhere for You".

== Track listing ==
No.	Title	Writer(s)	Length
1.	"Never Find Someone Like You"	Danny Sembello; Marty Sharron	4:33
2.	"Any Kind of Reason"	Parker; Bobby Brown	5:13
3.	"Somehow, Someway"	Hanton; Portee	4:40
4.	"If Love Feels So Good (Why Does It Hurt So Bad)"	Sembello; Sharron	4:43
5.	"One Mile from Paradise"	Michael McCary; Thompson; Keith Martin	4:01
6.	"Moment in Time"	Martin	4:58
7.	"Operator"	Thompson; Martin	4:12
8.	"Forever Will Be"	Clifford Jones	5:00
9.	"Give It Up"	Parker; Brown	4:39
10.	"You'll Never Be Alone"	Johnson; Martin; Chris Arms	4:09
11.	"Real Love"	Dennis Walters; Martin	4:14
12.	"L.O.V.E. Love"	Richards; Walton; Martin	4:05
13.	"Think of You All the Time"	Martin	5:17
14.	"Because of You"	Martin	3:56

== Album credits ==
Producers: Clifford "Snags" Jones, Keith Martin, John Oates, Michael McCary, Danny Sembello, Marti Sharron and others. Dennis Walters
Executive producers : Inerje Barrett and Michael McCary for Black Panther Productions Inc.
