= P.S.K. What Does It Mean? =

Single by Schoolly D

from the album Schoolly D
- B-side: "Gucci Time"
- Released: 1985
- Recorded: 1985
- Genre: East Coast hip-hop; hardcore hip-hop; gangsta rap
- Length: 6:02
- Label: Schoolly D
- Songwriter: J.B. Weaver Jr.
- Producer: J.B. Weaver Jr.

Schoolly D singles chronology
"Gangster Boogie" (1984)	"P.S.K. What Does It Mean?" (1985)	"C.I.A." (1985)

"P.S.K. What Does It Mean?" (also written as "P.S.K. (What Does It Mean?)") is a song released in 1985 by Philadelphia rapper Schoolly D on his independent label Schoolly D Records. P.S.K. is the abbreviation for Park Side Killas, a street gang with which Schoolly D was affiliated. The highly influential song is considered the first gangsta rap and hardcore rap song and features descriptions of graphic sex, gun violence, drug references, along with one of the first uses of the word "nigga" in a rap song (earlier uses include "Scoopy Rap" and "Family Rap" in 1979 and "New York New York" in 1983).

It would be critical to the rise of West Coast gangsta rap when the street hustler, gang member and upcoming rapper by the name of Ice-T released his hardcore anthem "6 in the Mornin'" that he has said in interviews was written after he heard Schoolly D's "P.S.K." Eazy-E's first song "Boyz-N-The-Hood" is also heavily influenced by "P.S.K." Another fan of the song is musician Moby and Danny Diablo, who covered it with the Lordz of Brooklyn.

The influential beat was performed by a Roland TR-909 drum machine. It would later be the basis of Siouxsie and the Banshees' song "Kiss Them for Me" and Strike's "I Have Peace" while "Pearl" by Chapterhouse and a remix of "Ain't Nobody Stupid", written by Ne-Yo, amongst many other acts. Schoolly D has said that the distinctive large amount of reverb on the drums on the track was influenced by him and his crew's heavy use of marijuana while recording, and that they kept calling out for "more reverb" during the session.

== Reception ==
The Atlantic said, "Schoolly D's wild-night narrative is a criminal picaresque: drugs, guns, prostitution, all of that. He raps in dissociated singsong, each line descending in pitch, downwardly curving like a sneer or an arc of desensitization. Groundbreaking stuff, at the time. The rapping was one thing, but then there was the icy futurism of the beat. It's a masterpiece."
