= Schoolly D =

American rapper (born 1962)

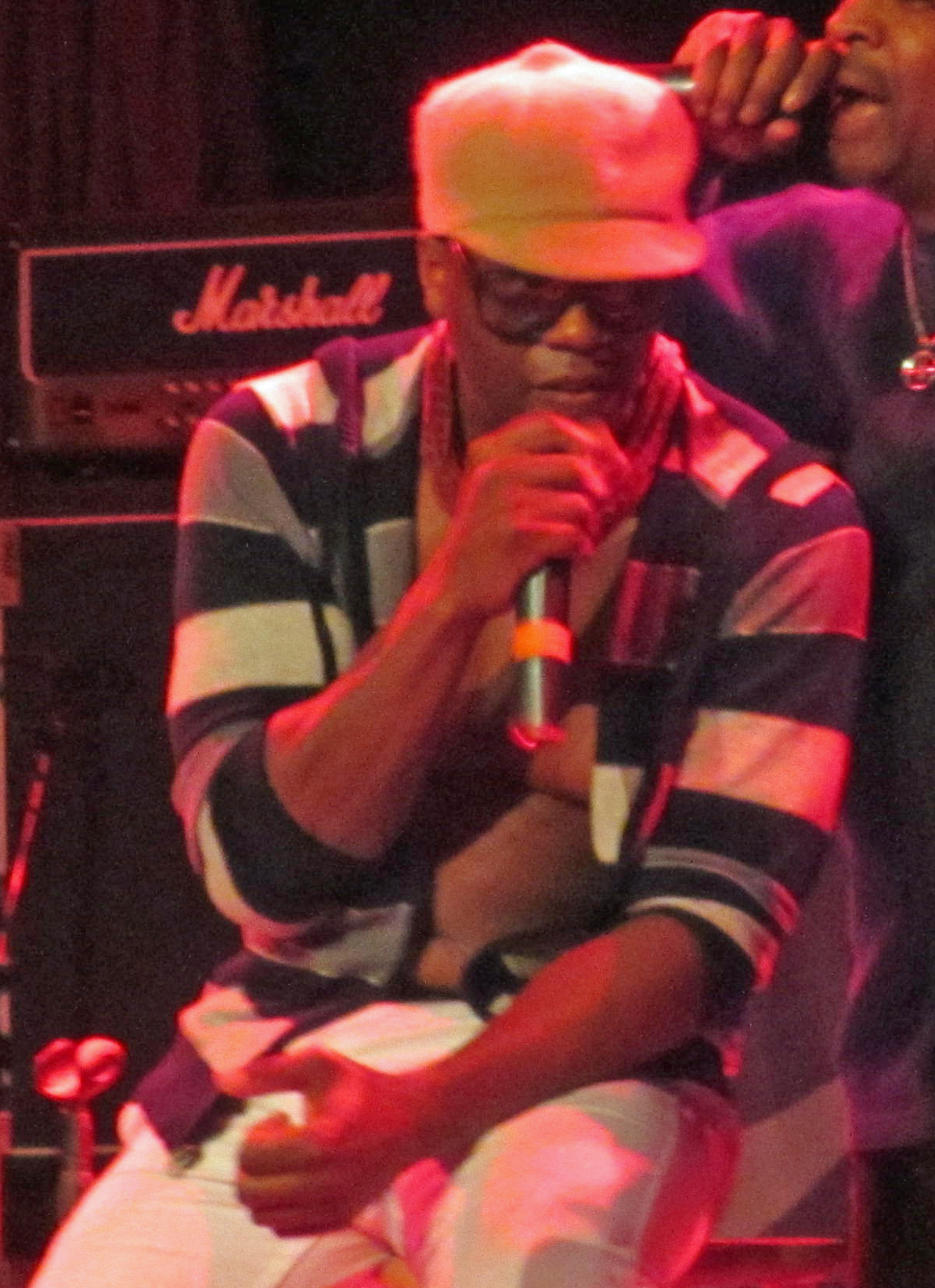
- Schoolly D at the House of Blues in 2012

Background information
- Born: Jesse Bonds Weaver Jr. June 22, 1962 (age 64); Philadelphia, Pennsylvania, U.S.
- Genres: East Coast hip hop; gangsta rap; hardcore hip hop
- Occupations: Rapper; musician; composer; DJ; voice-over artist; actor
- Years active: 1984–present
- Labels: Jive/BMG; Capitol/EMI; Ruffhouse/Columbia/SME

Jesse Bonds Weaver Jr. (born June 22, 1962), better known by the stage name Schoolly D, is an American rapper from Philadelphia, Pennsylvania.

== Early life ==
Schoolly D was born Jesse Bonds Weaver Jr. in West Philadelphia, Pennsylvania, and raised in Philadelphia as well as Georgia.

== Career ==
In the mid-1980s, Schoolly D teamed up with DJ Code Money with lyrics reflecting urban realism, violence, and sexual bravado. He was interviewed in the 1986 documentary Big Fun in the Big Town. He later embraced an Afrocentric style, bringing Afrocentric culture to hip hop along with KRS-One.

Schoolly D contributed songs and music to many Abel Ferrara films, including "P.S.K." and "Saturday Night" (from Saturday Night! – The Album) as well as "King of New York" to Ferrara's film of the same name and the title track from Am I Black Enough For You? that was played during the climactic shoot-out in that film, the title track from How a Black Man Feels, and "Signifying Rapper" (from Smoke Some Kill), which was used in Ferrara's film Bad Lieutenant. Because Led Zeppelin successfully sued because of an uncleared interpolation of its song "Kashmir" in "Signifying Rapper", the song was omitted from the soundtrack of the film and from subsequent releases of the film.

Composer Joe Delia tapped Schoolly to co-write and record "The Player" for Ferrara's film The Blackout, which Delia scored. Schoolly also wrote the score to Ferrara's 'R Xmas. In 2006, Schoolly D co-wrote the indie film soundtrack of the historical science fiction thriller Order of the Quest with Chuck Treece. The project series is produced by Benjamin Barnett, and Jay D Clark of Media Bureau. His eighth album, Funk 'N Pussy, on Jeff "Met" Thies' Chord Recordings features guest appearances by Public Enemy's Chuck D, Chuck Chillout, Lady B and a drum and bass remix of the classic Schoolly D track "Mr. Big Dick" (remixed by UK trip hop crew The Sneaker Pimps).

Schoolly also performed the music and occasional narration for the cult animated series Aqua Teen Hunger Force on the Cartoon Network's Adult Swim programming block. He was a guest on a first-season episode of Space Ghost Coast to Coast. He also created the song "Sharkian Nights" for the Adult Swim series 12 oz. Mouse.

== Legacy ==
Rapper Ice-T, who is often given credit for the creation of gangsta rap, discussed Schoolly D's influence on him in his autobiography:

The first record that came out along those lines was Schoolly D's "P.S.K." Then the syncopation of that rap was used by me when I made "6 in the Mornin'." The vocal delivery was the same: "...P.S.K. is makin' that green," "...six in the morning, police at my door." When I heard that record I was like, "Oh shit!" and call it a bite or what you will but I dug that record. My record didn't sound like "P.S.K.," but I liked the way he was flowing with it. "P.S.K." was talking about Park Side Killers but it was very vague. That was the only difference, when Schoolly did it, it was "...one by one, I'm knockin' em out." All he did was represent a gang on his record. I took that and wrote a record about guns, beating people down, and all that with "6 in the Mornin'."

== Discography ==
=== Studio albums ===
Schoolly D "P.S.K. 'What Does It Mean'?" (1985)
25-second sample from Schoolly D's first album.

- 1985: Schoolly D
- 1986: Saturday Night! – The Album
- 1988: Smoke Some Kill
- 1989: Am I Black Enough for You?
- 1991: How a Black Man Feels
- 1994: Welcome to America
- 1995: Reservoir Dog
- 2000: Funk 'N Pussy
- 2008: Schoolly D's Out Cold
- 2010: International Supersport
- 2019: The Real Hardcore
- 2024: ’Cuz that Nigga’s Crazy, That’s Why!

=== Compilations ===
- 1987: The Adventures of Schoolly D
- 1995: The Jive Collection, Vol. 3
- 1996: A Gangster's Story: 1984–1996
- 2000: Best on Wax (5 Years of Schoolly D)
- 2003: The Best of Schoolly D
- 2019: The Official Adventures of... Schoolly D
