= Gangsta rap =

Subgenre of hip-hop

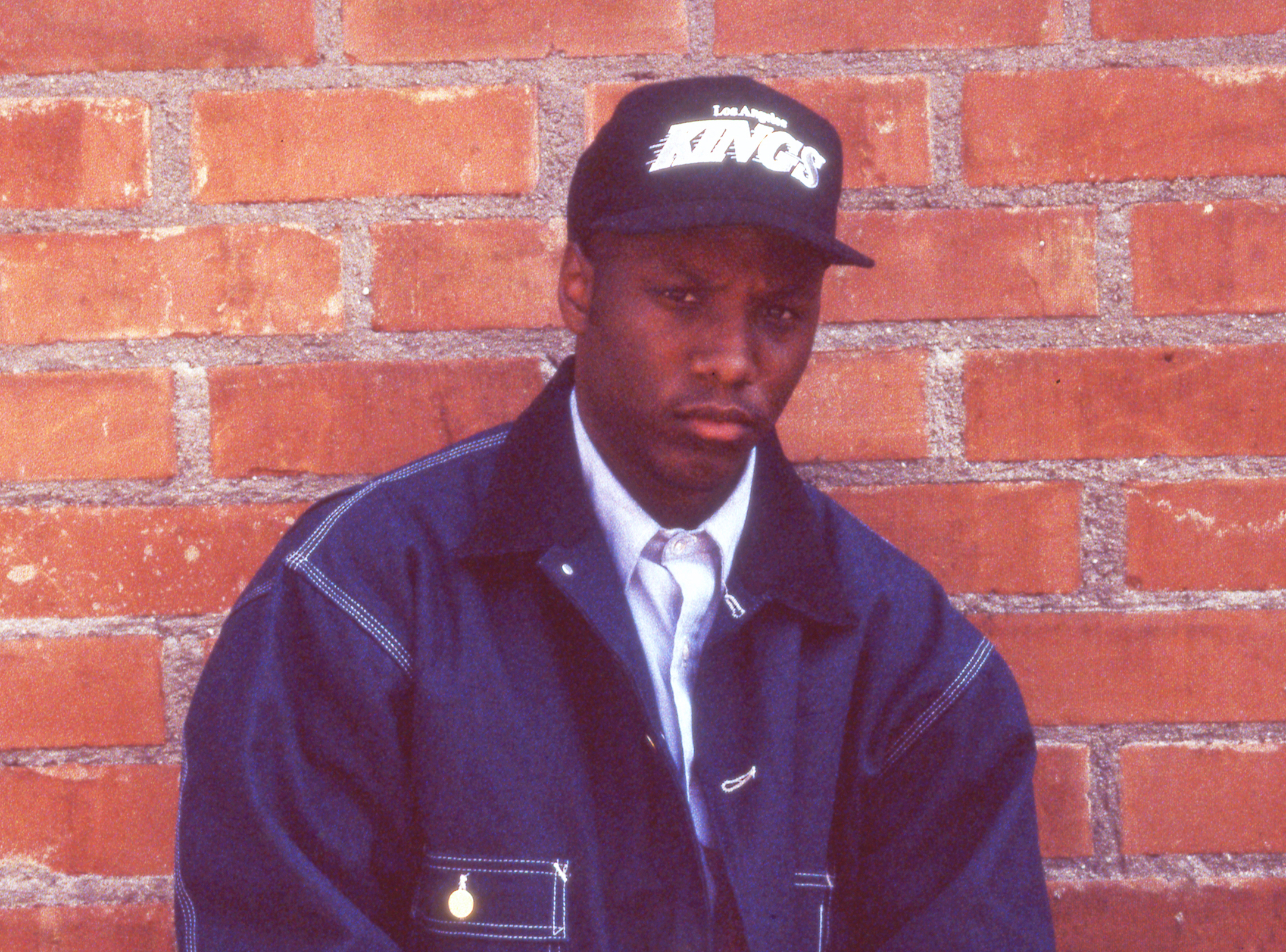
- MC Ren of N.W.A. in Los Angeles, 1990
- Stylistic origins: Hip-hop; hardcore hip-hop; political hip-hop
- Cultural origins: Mid-to-late 1980s; Oakland; Los Angeles; Philadelphia; New York

Subgenres
- Drill; mafioso rap; trap; road rap

Fusion genres
- G-funk

Regional scenes
- West Coast hip-hop; East Coast hip-hop; Southern hip-hop; Northwest hip-hop; Midwestern hip-hop; Canadian hip-hop; Irish hip-hop; British hip-hop (including Scottish hip-hop and Welsh hip-hop); Australian hip-hop; New Zealand hip-hop; Samoan hip-hop

Other topics
- Horrorcore; progressive rap

Gangsta rap (also spelled gangster rap), initially called reality rap, is a subgenre of hip-hop that conveys the culture, values, and experiences of urban gangs and street hustlers, frequently discussing unpleasant realities of the world in general through an urban lens. Emerging in the mid-to-late 1980s, gangsta rap's pioneers include Schoolly D and Ice-T, later expanding with artists such as N.W.A. In early-mid 1990s, via record producer and rapper Dr. Dre, rapper Snoop Dogg, and their G-funk sound, gangsta rap broadened to mainstream popularity.

Gangsta rap has been recurrently accused of promoting disorderly conduct and broad criminality, especially assault, homicide, and drug dealing, as well as misogyny, promiscuity, and materialism. Gangsta rap's defenders have variously characterized it as artistic depictions but not literal endorsements of real life in American ghettos, or suggested that some lyrics voice rage against social oppression or police brutality, and have often accused critics of hypocrisy and racial bias. Still, gangsta rap has been assailed even by some black public figures, including Spike Lee, pastor Calvin Butts and activist C. Delores Tucker.

== 1985–1988: Early years ==
=== Schoolly D and Ice-T ===
Philadelphia rapper Schoolly D is generally considered the first "gangsta rapper", significantly influencing the more popular early gangsta rap originator, Ice-T. Ice-T was born in Newark, New Jersey in 1958. As a teenager, he moved to Los Angeles where he rose to prominence in the West Coast hip-hop scene. An early case of using "gangsta" as an adjective and a compliment came in his 1984 single Body Rock. In 1986, Ice-T released "6 in the Mornin'", which is regarded as the second gangsta rap song. Ice-T had been MCing since the early 1980s, but first turned to gangsta rap themes after being influenced by Schoolly D's self-titled debut album, and especially the song "P.S.K. What Does It Mean?" (1985), which is regarded as the first gangsta rap song. In an interview with PROPS magazine, Ice-T said:

Here's the exact chronological order of what really went down: The first record that came out along those lines was Schoolly D's "P.S.K." Then the syncopation of that rap was used by me when I made "6 in the Mornin'". The vocal delivery was the same: ' ... P.S.K. is makin' that green', ' ... six in the morning, police at my door'. When I heard that record I was like "Oh shit!" and call it a bite or what you will but I dug that record. My record didn't sound like P.S.K., but I liked the way he was flowing with it. P.S.K. was talking about Park Side Killers but it was very vague. That was the only difference, when Schoolly did it, it was "... one by one, I'm knockin' em out." All he did was represent a gang on his record. I took that and wrote a record about guns, beating people down and all that with "6 in the Mornin'". At the same time my single came out, Boogie Down Productions hit with Criminal Minded, which was a gangster-based album. It wasn't about messages or "You Must Learn", it was about gangsterism.

In 2011, Ice-T repeated in his autobiography that Schoolly D was his inspiration for gangsta rap. Ice-T continued to release gangsta albums for the remainder of the 1980s: Rhyme Pays in 1987, Power in 1988 and The Iceberg/Freedom of Speech...Just Watch What You Say in 1989. Ice-T's lyrics also contained strong political commentary, and often played the line between glorifying the gangsta lifestyle and criticizing it as a no-win situation.

Schoolly D's works would heavily influence not only Ice-T, but also Eazy-E and N.W.A (most notably in the song "Boyz-n-the-Hood"), as well as the Beastie Boys on their seminal hardcore hip-hop-inspired album Licensed to Ill (1986). Schoolly D would continue to release hardcore hip-hop with the albums Smoke Some Kill (1988) and Am I Black Enough for You? (1989).

=== Boogie Down Productions ===
Boogie Down Productions released their first single, "Say No Brother (Crack Attack Don't Do It)", in 1986. It was followed by "South Bronx/P is Free" and "9mm Goes Bang" in the same year. The latter is the most gangsta-themed song of the three; in it, KRS-One boasts about shooting a crack dealer and his posse to death (in self-defense). The album Criminal Minded followed in 1987, and was the first rap album to have firearms on its cover. Shortly after the release of this album, BDP's DJ, Scott LaRock was shot and killed.

=== Other early influences ===
The New York–based Run-DMC and LL Cool J, though originating prior to the establishment of "gangsta rap" as a cohesive genre, were influential in the formation of gangsta rap, often producing early aggressive hardcore hip-hop songs and being among the first rappers to dress in gang-like street clothing. The seminal Long Island–based group Public Enemy featured aggressive, politically charged lyrics, which had an especially strong influence on gangsta rappers such as Ice Cube. The duo Eric B. & Rakim would further influence gangsta rap with aggressive, street-oriented raps, especially on the 1987 album Paid in Full.

The hip-hop group Beastie Boys also influenced the gangsta rap genre with their 1986 album Licensed to Ill, with an early reference to being a "gangster" mentioned in the song "Slow Ride". In 1986, the Los Angeles–based group C.I.A. (consisting of Ice Cube, K-Dee, Sir Jinx) rapped over the Beastie Boys' tracks for songs such as "My Posse" and "Ill-Legal", and the Beastie Boys' influence can be seen significantly in N.W.A's early albums. The Beastie Boys had started out as a hardcore punk band, but after introduction to producer Rick Rubin and the exit of Kate Schellenbach they became a hip-hop group. According to Rolling Stone Magazine, the Beastie Boys' 1986 album Licensed to Ill is "filled with enough references to guns, drugs and empty sex (including the pornographic deployment of a Wiffleball bat in "Paul Revere") to qualify as a gangsta-rap cornerstone."

== 1989–1997: Golden age ==
=== N.W.A and Ice Cube ===
The first blockbuster gangsta rap album was N.W.A's Straight Outta Compton (1989). It established West Coast hip-hop as a vital genre and Los Angeles as a legitimate rival to hip-hop's long-time capital, New York City. Straight Outta Compton sparked the first major controversy regarding hip-hop lyrics when their song "Fuck tha Police" earned a letter from FBI Assistant Director, Milt Ahlerich, strongly expressing law enforcement's resentment of the song. Due to the influence of Ice-T, N.W.A, and Ice Cube's early solo career, gangsta rap is often somewhat erroneously credited as being a mostly West Coast phenomenon, despite the contributions of East Coast acts like Boogie Down Productions in shaping the genre and despite Philadelphia rapper Schoolly D being generally regarded as the first gangsta rapper.

In the early 1990s, former N.W.A member Ice Cube would further influence gangsta rap with his hardcore, socio-political solo albums, which suggested the potential of gangsta rap as a political medium to give voice to inner-city youth. Ice Cube's early solo albums and EPs, including AmeriKKKa's Most Wanted (1990), Death Certificate (1991), the Kill at Will EP (1991) and The Predator (1992) all contributed significantly to the development of gangsta rap. N.W.A's second album, Efil4zaggin (1991) (released after Ice Cube's departure from the group), broke ground as the first gangsta rap album to reach No. 1 on the Billboard pop charts.

Aside from N.W.A and Ice-T, Too Short (from Oakland), Kid Frost and the South Gate–based Latino group Cypress Hill were pioneering West Coast rappers with gangsta rap songs and themes. Above the Law also played an important role in the gangsta rap movement, especially with their 1990 debut album Livin' Like Hustlers.

=== Ice-T's solo career ===
Ice-T released one of the seminal albums of the genre, OG: Original Gangster in 1991. It also contained a song by his new thrash metal group Body Count, who released a self-titled album in 1992. Particular controversy surrounded one of its songs "Cop Killer". The rock song was intended to speak from the viewpoint of a police target seeking revenge on racist, brutal cops. Ice-T's rock song gained controversy, with observers ranging from President George H.W Bush and his Vice President Dan Quayle, the National Rifle Association of America, police organizations across the nation to various police advocacy groups. Consequently, Time Warner Music refused to release Ice-T's upcoming album Home Invasion and dropped Ice-T from the label. Ice-T suggested that the furor over the song was an overreaction, telling journalist Chuck Philips "... they've done movies about nurse killers and teacher killers and student killers. Arnold Schwarzenegger blew away dozens of cops as the Terminator. But I don't hear anybody complaining about that." In the same interview, Ice-T suggested to Philips that the misunderstanding of "Cop Killer", the misclassification of it as a rap song (rather than a rock song), and the attempts to censor it had racial overtones: "The Supreme Court says it's OK for a white man to burn a cross in public. But nobody wants a black man to write a record about a cop killer."

Ice-T's next album, Home Invasion, was postponed as a result of the controversy, and was finally released in 1993. While it contained gangsta elements, it was his most political album to date. After a proposed censoring of the Home Invasion album cover art, he left Warner Bros. Records. Ice-T's subsequent releases went back to straightforward gangsta rap, but were not as popular as his earlier releases.

=== G-funk and Death Row Records ===
In 1992, former N.W.A member Dr. Dre released The Chronic (1992) include "Nuthin' but a 'G' Thang", a massive seller (eventually going triple platinum) which showed that explicit gangsta rap could hold as much mass commercial appeal as the pop-oriented rap styles of MC Hammer, the Fresh Prince and Tone Lōc. The album established the dominance of West Coast gangsta rap and Dre's new post-N.W.A label, Death Row Records (owned by Dr. Dre along with Marion "Suge" Knight), as Dre's album showcased a stable of promising new Death Row rappers. The album also popularized the subgenre of G-funk, a slow, drawled form of hip-hop that dominated the rap charts for some time.

G-funk's sound was built on samples from P-Funk bands, especially Parliament and Funkadelic. It's multi-layered and danceable, with lyrics that often talk about guns, alcohol and marijuana, as solutions to life's problems. The single "Nuthin' but a 'G' Thang" became a crossover big hit, with its House Party-influenced video becoming an MTV staple despite that network's historic orientation towards rock music.

Another success was Ice Cube's Predator album, released at about the same time as The Chronic in 1992. It sold over 2 million copies and was No. 1 in the charts, propelled by the hit single "It Was a Good Day", despite the fact that Ice Cube was not a Death Row artist. One of the genre's biggest crossover stars was Dre's protégé Snoop Doggy Dogg (Doggystyle), whose exuberant, party-oriented themes made songs such as "Gin and Juice" club anthems and top hits nationwide. In 1996, 2Pac signed with Death Row and released the multi-platinum double album All Eyez on Me. Not long afterward, his murder brought gangsta rap into the national headlines and propelled his posthumous The Don Killuminati: The 7 Day Theory album (released under the alias "Makaveli") to the top of the charts. Lill 1/2 Dead released gangsta album. Warren G and Nate Dogg were other musicians at the forefront of G-funk. Successful G-funk influenced artists also included Spice 1, MC Lyte and MC Ren, all of them reaching decent positions on the Billboard 100, or soul chart in spite of not being associated with Death Row. Ray Luv released G single "Last Nite" in 1995.

=== Mafioso rap ===
Mafioso rap is a hardcore hip-hop subgenre founded by Kool G Rap in the late 1980s. East Coast mafioso rap was partially the counterpart of West Coast gangsta rap and G-funk. Mafioso rap is characterized by references to famous mobsters and mafiosi, racketeering and organized crime (particularly the Sicilian Mafia, the Italian-American Mafia, African-American organized crime, and Latin American organized crime or drug cartels) or has subject matter that would relate to the mafia. Though a significant amount of mafioso rap was grittier and more street-oriented, focusing on street-level organized crime, other mafioso rap artists frequently focused on lavish, self-indulgent, materialistic, and luxurious subject matter associated with crime bosses and high-level mobsters, such as expensive drugs, cars, champagne, and semi-legitimate businesses.

Though the genre receded for several years, it re-emerged in 1995 when Wu-Tang Clan member Raekwon released his critically acclaimed solo album Only Built 4 Cuban Linx... That year also saw the release of Doe or Die by AZ and the release of the album 4,5,6 by subgenre originator Kool G Rap. His album featured other mafioso rap artists, including MF Grimm, Nas, and B-1. These albums brought the genre to mainstream recognition, and inspired other East Coast rappers, such as Jay-Z, Notorious B.I.G., and Nas to adopt similar themes with their albums Reasonable Doubt, Life After Death, and It Was Written respectively.

In 1997, the supergroup the Firm emerged, composed of Nas, AZ, Cormega (replaced by Nature), and Foxy Brown, and released their debut album The Album, notably with production from Dr. Dre. Following the 1990s, many rappers such as T.I., Fabolous, Jadakiss, Jim Jones, and Cassidy have maintained popularity with lyrics about African-American organized crime. Lil' Kim's mafioso album La Bella Mafia, released in 2003, was a commercial success, receiving platinum certification.

In the 2000's, the term "coke rap" would be used to describe the style of rappers such as Freddie Gibbs and the Griselda Records artists. This variation incorporating heavy use of sampling jazz and R&B vocals from producers such as Conductor Williams, Madlib, and The Alchemist.

=== East Coast hardcore hip-hop and the East Coast–West Coast feud ===
Meanwhile, rappers from New York City, such as Wu-Tang Clan, Black Moon and Boot Camp Clik, Onyx, Big L, Mobb Deep, Nas, the Notorious B.I.G., DMX and the Lox, among others, pioneered a grittier sound known as hardcore hip-hop. In 1994, both Nas and the Notorious B.I.G. released their debut albums Illmatic (April 19) and Ready to Die (September 13) respectively, which paved the way for New York City to take back dominance from the West Coast. In an interview for The Independent in 1994, the Wu-Tang Clan's GZA commented on the term "gangsta rap" and its association with his group's music and hip-hop at the time:

Our music is not "gangsta rap". There's no such thing. The label was created by the media to limit what we can say. We just deliver the truth in a brutal fashion. The young black male is a target. Snoop (Doggy Dogg) has gone four times platinum and makes more money than the president. They don't like that, so you hear "ban this, ban that". We attack people's emotions. It's a real live show that brings out the inside in people. Like I said, intense.

— GZA

It is widely speculated that the ensuing East Coast–West Coast hip-hop rivalry between Death Row Records and Bad Boy Records resulted in the deaths of Death Row Records' 2Pac and Bad Boy Records' the Notorious B.I.G.. Even before the murders, Death Row had begun to unravel, as co-founder Dr. Dre had left earlier in 1996; in the aftermath of 2Pac's death, label owner Suge Knight was sentenced to prison for a parole violation, and Death Row proceeded to sink quickly as most of its remaining artists, including Snoop Dogg, left. Dr. Dre, at the MTV Video Music Awards, claimed that "gangsta rap was dead". While Puff Daddy's Bad Boy Entertainment fared better than its West Coast rival, it eventually began to lose popularity and support by the end of the decade, due to its pursuit of a more mainstream sound, as well as challenges from Atlanta and New Orleans–based labels, especially, Master P's No Limit stable of popular rappers.

=== Southern and Midwestern gangsta rap ===
Houston first came on to the national scene in the late 1980s with the violent and disturbing stories told by the Geto Boys (hit single "Mind Playing Tricks On Me"), with member Scarface achieving major solo success in the mid-1990s. After the deaths of Tupac Shakur and the Notorious B.I.G. and the media attention surrounding them, gangsta rap became an even greater commercial force. However, most of the industry's major labels were in turmoil, bankrupt, or creatively stagnant, and new labels representing the rap scenes in new locations sprang up.

Master P's No Limit Records label, based out of New Orleans, became quite popular in the late 1990s, though critical success was very scarce, with the exceptions of some later additions like Mystikal (Ghetto Fabulous, 1998). No Limit had begun its rise to national popularity with Master P's The Ghetto Is Trying to Kill Me! (1994), and had major hits with Silkk the Shocker (Charge It 2 Da Game, 1998) and C-Murder (Life or Death, 1998). No Limit released Mia X, Mr. Serv-On and TRU albums also. Cash Money Records, also based out of New Orleans, had enormous commercial success with Juvenile, B.G., Hot Boys, beginning in the late 1990s with a similar gangsta rap style like No Limit.

Memphis collective Hypnotize Minds, led by Three 6 Mafia and Project Pat, have taken gangsta rap to some of its darker extremes. Led by in-house producers DJ Paul and Juicy J, the label became known for its pulsating, menacing beats and uncompromisingly thuggish lyrics. However, in the mid-2000s, the group began attaining more mainstream popularity, eventually culminating in the Three 6 Mafia winning an Academy Award for the song "It's Hard out Here for a Pimp" from Hustle & Flow.

The chopped and screwed genre was developed in Houston, Texas, the location which is still most associated with the style. DJ Screw is credited with the creation of and early experimentation with the genre. DJ Screw began making mixtapes of the slowed-down music in the early 1990s and began the Screwed Up Click. This provided a significant outlet for MCs in the South-Houston area, and helped local rappers such as Willie D, Big Moe, Lil' Flip, E.S.G., UGK, Lil' Keke, South Park Mexican, and Z-Ro gain regional and sometimes national prominence.

=== Narco-rap ===
Narco-rap is a music scene, similar to the early underground gangsta rap scene, that emerged in north-eastern Mexico and southern Texas. Its lyrical content, popular among Latino youth, is violent and focuses on the power of drug cartels and the gruesomeness of the Mexican drug war. Narco-rap emerged in the urban areas of Tamaulipas, a Mexican state currently subject to a turf war between Los Zetas and the Gulf Cartel. Narco-rappers sing about the life of mobsters and the reality of the cities under the cartel's rule. Some of the key players of the genre are Cano y Blunt, DemenT and Big Los.

== 1997–2008: Bling era/crunk ==
Before the late 1990s, gangsta rap, while a huge-selling genre, had been regarded as well outside of the pop mainstream, committed to representing the experience of the inner-city and not "selling out" to the pop charts. However, the rise of Bad Boy Records, propelled by the massive crossover success of Bad Boy head Sean "Puffy" Combs's 1997 ensemble album, No Way Out, on the heels of the media attention generated by the murders of Tupac Shakur and the Notorious B.I.G., signaled a major stylistic change in gangsta rap (or as it is referred to on the East Coast, hardcore rap). It morphed into a new subgenre of hip-hop which would become even more commercially successful and popularly accepted. Gangsta Boo, Gangsta Blac, and Ghetto Twinz released Gangsta rap albums.

The earlier, somewhat controversial crossover success enjoyed by popular gangsta rap songs like "Gin and Juice" gave way to gangsta rap's becoming a widely accepted staple on the pop charts in the late 1990s. R&B-styled hooks and samples of well-known soul and pop songs from the 1970s and 1980s were the staples of this sound, which was showcased primarily in Sean "Puffy" Combs's latter-day production work for The Notorious B.I.G. ("Mo Money Mo Problems"), Mase ("Feels So Good") and non-Bad Boy artists such as Jay-Z, Jah and Amil ("Can I Get A..."). Also achieving similar levels of success with a similar sound at the same time as Bad Boy was Master P and his No Limit label in New Orleans, as well as the New Orleans upstart Cash Money label. Three 6 Mafia, Lil Jon, Pitbull, and Crime Mob released "crunk" CDs.

By the turn of the century, the style of gangsta rap pioneered by N.W.A. had long given way to materialism regarding money, women and cars. Gangsta rap remained popular in the early-mid 2000s, propelled by 50 Cent's influential Get Rich or Die Tryin' album, which contained "catchy" and melodic music that helped its success on pop charts, while rapping about themes of guns and wealth. In 2008, Gangsta Rap Maintained a Significant Presence on Music Charts. That year, Ice Cube released the album Raw Footage, Which Reached Number One on The Billboard Top Rap Albums chart and entered the top 10 of the Billboard 200. Snoop Dogg gained prominence with the album Ego Trippin', which debuted within the top 10 of the Billboard 200. 50 Cent remained present on rap charts with the single "Get Up", while the group G-Unit released the album T.O.S. (Terminate on Sight), which debuted among the top five positions on the Billboard 200. These Performances indicate that Gangsta rap Continued to achieve Commercial success and broad Visibility in 2008, among other artists of the genre.

== 2008–2019: Kanye vs. 50 Cent battle, mainstream decline ==
By the late 2000s, alternative hip-hop had secured its place within the mainstream, due in part to the declining commercial viability of gangsta rap. Industry observers view the sales race between Kanye West's Graduation and 50 Cent's Curtis, both released on September 11, 2007, as a turning point for hip-hop. West emerged the victor by selling nearly a million copies in the first week alone, proving alternative rap's commercial viability. Cyhi the Prynce called it the "biggest shift in our culture" and that it led to the sound of new rappers like Drake in 2009. Although he designed it as a melancholic pop album rather than a rap album, West's subsequent release 808s & Heartbreak in late 2008, would have a significant effect on hip-hop music. While his decision to sing about love, loneliness, and heartache for the entirety of the album was at first criticized by music audiences and the album was predicted to be a flop, its subsequent critical acclaim and commercial success encouraged other mainstream rappers to take greater creative risks with their music.

During the release of The Blueprint 3, New York rap mogul Jay-Z revealed that next studio album would be an experimental effort, stating, "... it's not gonna be a #1 album. That's where I'm at right now. I wanna make the most experimental album I ever made." Jay-Z elaborated that like Kanye, he was unsatisfied with contemporary hip-hop, was being inspired by indie-rockers like Grizzly Bear, and asserted his belief that the indie rock movement would play an important role in the continued evolution of hip-hop.

== Since 2019: Rise of drill, trap, chicano rap ==
In the 2010s, a new form of gangsta rap known as drill emerged from the Midwest, gaining popularity via rappers such as Lil Durk, Chief Keef, Lil Reese, King Von, Polo G and G Herbo. West Coast rapper Vince Staples is part of the new generation of rappers that is influenced by G-funk. Vince Staples' conscious rap album Summertime '06 (2015) reflects the "challenges of racism, injustice, and violent fallouts in his childhood neighborhood". T.I, Rick Ross, Future, and Gucci Mane released new rap style "trap" CDs.

Charlie Row Campo released "Stop Studio Gangstas" album. Other Afro-American and Chicano gangsta rappers who gained small success or big success include XXXTentacion, Kendrick Lamar, Ms Krazie, Knight Owl, Chino Grande, Lil Rob, Mr. Criminal, Mr. Capone-E, Mr. Sancho, ShooterGang Kony, Mozzy, YNW Melly, Pusha T, Nsanity, Jeezy (Young Jeezy), YG, Nipsey Hussle, Migos, Freddie Gibbs, Meek Mill, A$AP Mob, Jay Rock, ScHoolboy Q, 21 Savage, Kodak Black, 6ix9ine, Blueface, NBA Youngboy, NLE Choppa, Pop Smoke, Young Dolph and BlocBoy JB.

Gangsta rap's pioneers have met success in other forms of pop culture as well. In 2016, N.W.A was inducted to the Rock and Roll Hall of Fame. They were followed up by the late Tupac Shakur in 2017 who was inducted as the first solo hip-hop act, under his first year of eligibility as a nominee. Other Rock and Roll Hall of Fame Hip-Hop Acts include the 2007 induction of Grandmaster Flash and the Furious Five, who are considered pioneers of expanding the sound of Hip-Hop from disco inspired partying, to street reality that inspired social change. The 2009 induction of Run-DMC to the Rock and Roll Hall of Fame opened the door for more Hip-Hop inductions, as they were followed up by the 2012 induction of Beastie Boys, and the 2013 induction of Public Enemy.

== Criticism and debate ==
The explicit nature of gangsta rap's lyrics has made it heavily controversial. There is also debate about the causation between gangsta rap and violent behavior. A study by the Prevention Research Center of the Pacific Institute for Research and Evaluation in Berkeley, Calif., finds young people who listen to rap and hip-hop are more likely to abuse alcohol and commit violent acts. The study did not find a causal relationship between rap music and alcohol abuse and violent acts, noting that young people who engage in this behavior may listen to rap music for any number of reasons, including to fit into a subculture or to find relatable content that reflects their life experiences and trauma. A 2020 study found no causal relationship between drill music, a gangsta rap genre with notoriously violent lyrics, and real-world violence when compared to police-recorded violent crime data in London.

Critics of gangsta rap hold that it glorifies and encourages criminal behavior, and may be at least partially to blame for the existence of street gangs. Those who are supportive or at least less critical of gangsta rap hold that crime on the street level is for the most part a reaction to poverty and that gangsta rap reflects the reality of lower class life. Many believe that the blaming of crime on gangsta rap is a form of unwarranted moral panic; The World Development Report 2011, for instance, confirmed that most street gang members maintain that poverty and unemployment is what drove them to crime; none made reference to music. Ice Cube famously satirized the blame placed on gangsta rap for social ills in his song "Gangsta Rap Made Me Do It". Many gangsta rappers maintain they are playing a "role" in their music like an actor in a play or film, and do not encourage the behavior in their music.

Moreover, English scholar Ronald A.T. Judy has argued that gangsta rap reflects the experience of blackness at the end of political economy, when capital is no longer wholly produced by human labor but in a globalized system of commodities. In this economy, gangsta rap traffics blackness as a commodifiable effect of "being a nigga". In other words, gangsta rap defines the experience of blackness, in which he locates in gangsta rap's deployment of the word "nigga", in this new global economic system as "adaptation to the force of commodification". For Judy, nigga (and gangsta rap) becomes an epistemologically authentic category for describing the condition of being black in the modern "realm of things".

Despite this, many who hold that gangsta rap is not responsible for social ills are critical of the way many gangsta rappers intentionally exaggerate their criminal pasts for the sake of street credibility. Rick Ross and Slim Jesus among others have been heavily criticized for this.

=== 2Pacalypse Now controversy ===
In 1992, then-U.S. Vice President Dan Quayle blasted the recording industry for producing rap music he believed led to violence. Quayle called on Time Warner Inc. subsidiary, Interscope Records, to withdraw Tupac Shakur's 1991 debut album 2Pacalypse Now from stores. Quayle stated, "There is absolutely no reason for a record like this to be published—It has no place in our society." Quayle's motivation came in light of the murder of a Texas state trooper Bill Davidson, who had been shot by Ronald Ray Howard after he had been pulled over. Howard was driving a stolen vehicle while songs from 2Pacalypse Now were playing on the tape deck when he was stopped by the officer. The family of Davidson filed a civil suit against Shakur and Interscope Records, claiming the record's violent lyrics incite "imminent lawless action". District Judge John D. Rainey held that Shakur and the record companies did not have the duty to prevent distributing his music when they could not reasonably foresee violence arising from the distribution, nor was there any intent for the usage of the music as a "product for purposes of recovery under a products liability theory". Judge Rainey concluded the suit by ruling the Davidsons' argument that the music was unprotected speech under the First Amendment was irrelevant.

=== C. Delores Tucker ===
Politicians such as C. Delores Tucker have cited concerns with sexually explicit and misogynistic lyrics featured in hip-hop tracks. Tucker claimed the explicit lyrics used in hip-hop songs were threatening to the African-American community. Tucker, who once was the highest-ranking African American woman in the Pennsylvania state government, focused on rap music in 1993, labeling it as "pornographic filth" and claiming it was offensive and demeaning to black women. Tucker stated, "You can't listen to all that language and filth without it affecting you." Tucker also handed out leaflets containing lyrics from rap music and urged people to read them aloud. She picketed stores that sold the music and handed out petitions. She then proceeded to buy stock in Time Warner, Sony and other companies for the sole purpose to protest rap music at shareholders meetings. In 1994, Tucker protested when the NAACP nominated rapper Tupac Shakur for one of its image awards as Outstanding Actor in a Motion Picture from his role in Poetic Justice.

Some rappers labeled her "narrow-minded", and some ridiculed her in their lyrics, notably Shakur, who mentions her multiple times in his diamond certified 1996 album All Eyez on Me. Shakur mentions Tucker in the tracks "Wonda Why They Call U Bitch" and "How Do U Want It", where Shakur raps "Delores Tucker, you's a motherfucker/Instead of trying to help a nigga you destroy a brother." Tucker filed a $10 million lawsuit against Shakur's estate for the comments made in both songs. In her lawsuit, she claimed that the comments were slanderous, caused her emotional distress and invaded her personal privacy. The case was eventually dismissed. Shakur was not the only rap artist to mention her in his songs, as Jay-Z, Eminem, Lil' Kim, the Game and Lil Wayne have all previously criticized Tucker for her opposition of the genre.

=== First Amendment rights ===
Gangsta rap has also raised questions of whether it is protected speech under the First Amendment to the United States Constitution, since lyrics may express violence and may be considered true threats. The Supreme Court ruled in Elonis v. United States (2015) that mens rea, the intent to commit a crime, is necessary to convict someone of a crime for using threatening words in a rap song.

In a notable case, rapper Jamal Knox, performing as "Mayhem Mal", wrote a gangsta rap song named "F*** the Police" shortly after he was arrested for gun and drug charges in Pittsburgh. The song's lyrics specifically named the two arresting officers, and included explicit violent threats including "Let's kill these cops cuz they don't do us no good". One of the officers, believing to be threatened, subsequently left the force.

Knox was convicted of making terroristic threats and of witness intimidation in a bench trial, and the conviction was affirmed by the Supreme Court of Pennsylvania, which held that the song's lyrics amounted to a true threat. Knox petitioned the Supreme Court of the United States to hear the case, and academics joined rappers Killer Mike, Chance the Rapper, Meek Mill, Yo Gotti, Fat Joe and 21 Savage in an amicus curiae brief arguing that Knox's song should be seen as a political statement and thus is protected speech. The Supreme Court declined review in April 2019.

== International influence ==
=== German gangsta-rap ===
The gangsta-rap movement in Germany derived its roots from the 1990s; since 2003–2004, it has become a successful subgenre of German hip-hop. Contextually and musically, it borrows its influences from the French and US-based gangsta rap and battle rap. Although there is a certain correlation between street-rap and gangsta-rap, gangsta-rap is not considered as a derivative genre since it is only partially related to street-rap and has contextually little to do with the other subgenre.

==== History ====
Pioneers of the subgenre gangsta-rap, who have been active since the 1990s, are Kool Savas and Azad. Within the genre, they implemented an incredibly explicit, broken and aggressive text, that originally still had much influence from English text elements. This style of rap, after the turn of the century, was implemented by the majority of gangsta-rappers in Germany and is, therefore, a very well respected form on the approach of German gangsta-rap. On the other hand, Savas distanced himself from these vulgar and explicit texts. One of the founding fathers of German gangsta-rap, Charnell, the little-known rapper and martial-arts artist, thematized growing up in the midst of a social renaissance. Gangsta-rap in other countries, that resembled the music of the Rödelheim Hartreim Projekt in Germany, was commercially successful in the 2000s. Germany at the time, however, had few rappers active in this subgenre; allowing certain artists in the Berlin underground-hip-hop scene an opportunity to establish themselves with their lyrics representing a certain hardship acquired through the criminal lifestyle which had previously been popularized. Recognizable names from the underground scene are Bass Sultan Hengzt, Fler, MC Bogy or MOK. Another notable rapper and pioneer of gangsta-rap in Germany is Azad. Although he came from the rural Frankfurt am Main, he was a big reason this subgenre became popular in Germany. In his lyrical text, he thematized the rigid and rough lifestyle of living in the northwest district of Frankfurt.

At the beginning of 2003, the process of commercialization of this subgenre began. Contrary to popular belief, a variable of the German gangsta-rap became popular before the actual subgenre itself did. When Sido, a notoriously known rapper from Berlin, released his album Maske which thematized gangs, drugs and violence, this album became the first of its genre to sell 100,000 copies. Following that album Sido released another two named Ich and Ich und meine Maske which both had over 100,000 sold copies and emphasized the success of his first album.

Following the success of Sido and his albums, Bushido became the next artist to emerge from the German gangsta-rap scene. He established himself a career and became the most important representative of German gangsta-rap of his time. Aggro Berlin, the label those two artists were both represented by, stated that this version of rap was the second, more aggressive evolution of German hip-hop. Bushido's albums Carlo Cokxxx Nutten with Fler and Bushido's debut album Vom Bordstein bis zur Skyline had relatively little success although the prominent topics on his album reflected directly with the themes that made Sido popular.

Following the continuous success of Sido and Bushido came a wave of rappers who were trying, with the help of major-labels, to establish themselves and be recognized by the populace. Eventually came Massiv, who was signed with Sony BMG, and was crowned by his label to be the German 50 Cent. This artist did not reach the success of 50 Cent. Further artists such as Baba Saad or Kollegah have since then established themselves as relatively successful in the German charts. As of recently, names such as Farid Bang, Nate57, Majoe & Jasko and Haftbefehl have appeared on the charts regularly.

=== Road rap ===
Road rap (also known as British gangsta rap or simply UK gangsta rap) is a genre of music pioneered in South London, primarily in Brixton and Peckham. The genre was pioneered by groups such as PDC, SMS, SN1, North Star, MashTown, U.S.G. and artists such as Giggs, K Koke, Nines and Sneakbo. The genre came to the fore as a backlash against the perceived commercialisation of grime in the mid-late 2000s in London. The genre came to prominence around 2007 with the rise of Giggs. Road rap retained the explicit depictions of violence and British gang culture found in some early grime music and combines it with a musical style more similar to American gangsta rap than the sound system influenced music of grime, dubstep, UK garage, jungle, reggae and dub.

Gangs played a large part in the genre, with gangs such as the Peckham Boys (with its various sets such as SN1, PYG and OPB), based in Peckham and GAS Gang, based in Brixton, becoming notable in the road rap scene during the 2000s.

The road rap scene centres around mixtape releases and YouTube videos with some of the genre's more popular acts getting mainstream recognition. The genre has been criticised for the relentless nihilism and violence in its lyrics as well as its links to gangs and gun crime with many rappers serving prison sentences. In keeping with grime, road rap has suffered from pre-emptive policing with Giggs claiming that the Metropolitan Police have set out to deny him the opportunity to make a living from music having banned him from touring. In 2011, Stigs was served the first ever gang injunction that banned him from rapping about anything that may encourage violence.

In the early 2010s, the American genre drill began to emerge in the UK, pushed by groups such as 150, 67 and Section Boyz. UK drill has been referred to as subgenre of road rap due to the influence it has had on the genre. Road rap also went on to influence afroswing, which emerged in the mid-2010s.

== See also ==
- List of gangsta rap artists
- List of criminal enterprises, gangs, and syndicates
- List of murdered hip-hop musicians
- Narcocorrido
- Road rap

== Sources ==
- Judy, R. A. T. (1994). "On the Question of Nigga Authenticity". Boundary 2. 21 (3). Duke University Press: 211–230. doi:10.2307/303605. JSTOR 303605.
