= DJ Code Money =

Deejay for rap artist Schoolly D

DJ Code Money was the deejay for noted 1980s rap artist Schoolly D of Philadelphia.

Their first single, "P.S.K. What Does It Mean?", is sometimes viewed as the first gangsta rap record. The track includes hypnotic beats, rough scratching, and Schoolly's unflinching tales of the Park Side Killers: "I said 'You sucka-ass nigga, I should shoot you dead.'" Other singles released by the pair include "Gucci Time" (sampled by the Beastie Boys on "Time to Get Ill"), "Put Your Filas On", and "Saturday Night".
