= Ice-T discography =

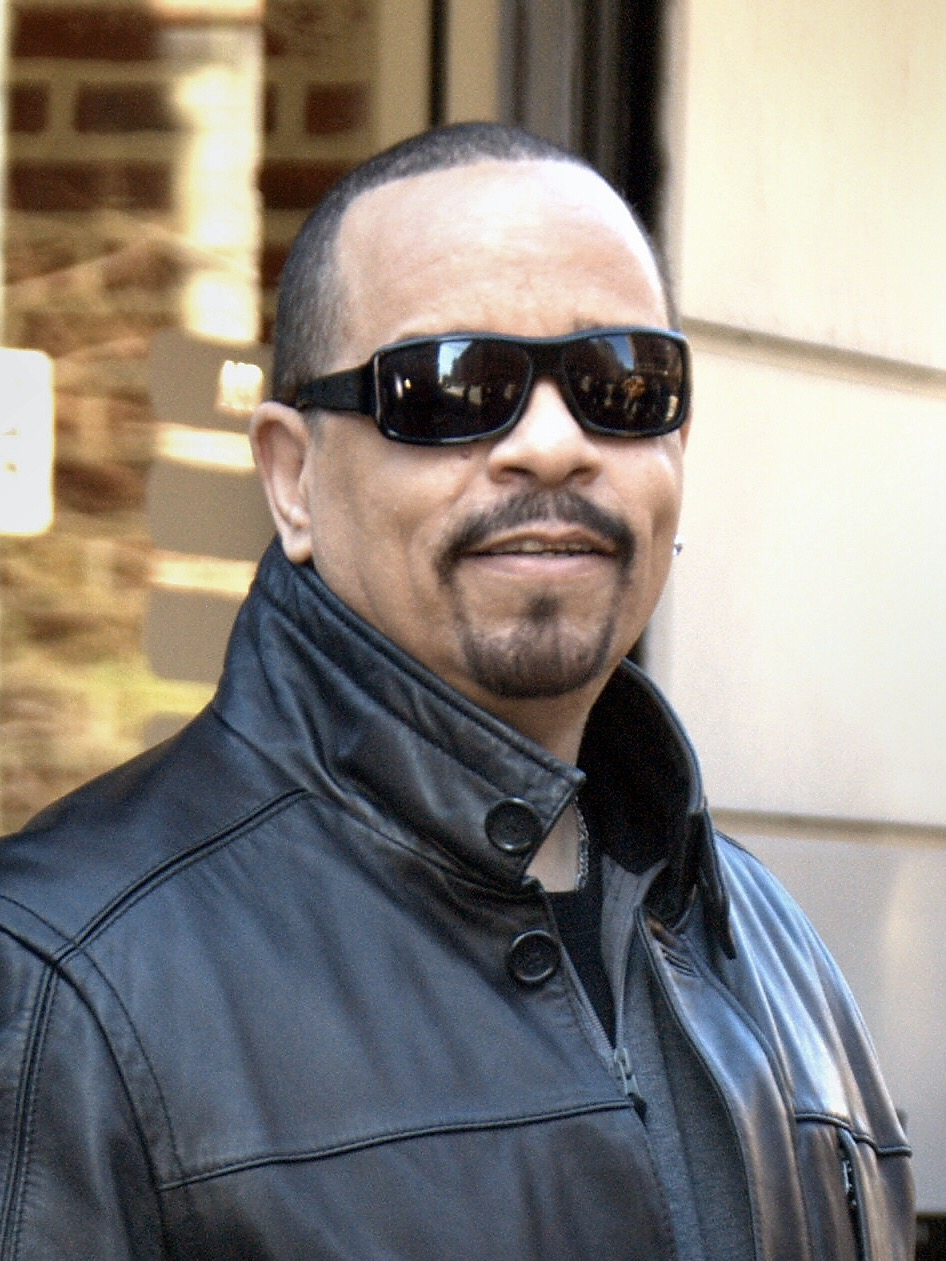
- Studio albums: 8
- Extended plays: 1
- Soundtrack albums: 1
- Live albums: 3
- Compilation albums: 7
- Singles: 51
- Video albums: 5
- Music videos: 50

The discography of American rapper and actor Ice-T consists of eight studio albums, ten compilation album, 51 singles, and 80 music videos. Ice-T has sold over 20 million albums in the US alone. Ice has been known to collaborate with Ice Cube, 2 Live Crew, South Central Cartel, DJ Evil E, Everlast, Donald D, Kool Keith, West Coast All-Stars, Brotha Lynch Hung, 2Pac, The Notorious B.I.G., DJ Aladdin, Afrika Bambaataa, Too Short, Snoop Dogg, Public Enemy, Mobb Deep and many more.

== Albums ==
=== Studio albums ===
Title	Album details	Peak chart positions				Certifications
Title	Album details	US	US R&B	AUS	UK	Certifications
Rhyme Pays	Released: July 28, 1987; Label: Sire / Warner Bros.; Format: CD, cassette, digital download, LP	93	26	—	—	RIAA: Gold
Power	Released: September 13, 1988; Label: Sire / Warner Bros.; Format: CD, cassette, digital download, LP	36	6	65	—	RIAA: Platinum; ARIA: Gold; MC: Gold
The Iceberg/Freedom of Speech... Just Watch What You Say!	Released: October 10, 1989; Label: Sire / Warner Bros.; Format: CD, cassette, digital download, LP	37	11	81	42	RIAA: Gold; MC: Gold
O.G. Original Gangster	Released: May 14, 1991; Label: Sire / Warner Bros.; Format: CD, cassette, digital download, LP	15	9	42	38	RIAA: Gold; MC: Gold; BPI: Silver
Home Invasion	Released: March 23, 1993; Label: Priority; Format: CD, cassette, digital download, LP	14	19	16	15	RIAA: Gold; BPI: Gold
Ice-T VI: Return of the Real	Released: June 4, 1996; Label: Priority; Format: CD, cassette, digital download, LP	89	19	31	26	
The Seventh Deadly Sin	Released: September 12, 1999; Label: Coroner / Roadrunner; Format: CD, cassette, digital download	—	—	—	—	
Gangsta Rap	Released: October 31, 2006; Label: Melee / Rhyme Syndicate; Format: CD, digital download	—	—	—	—	
Criminal Migraine	Released: August 17, 2026; Label: Self-released / Independent (IceT.com); Format: digital download	—	—	—	—	

=== Live albums ===
Title	Album details
Check This Out	Released: 1993; Label: International Broadcast Recordings
Gang Culture	Released: 2004; Label: Charly Records
Live in Montreaux	Released: 2006; Label: Charly Films

=== Compilation albums ===
Title	Album details
The Classic Collection	Released: 1993; Label: Excello, Rhino Records
Cold as Ever	Released: April 1996; Label: Blue Dolphin Entertainment; Label: Rhino Records
The Early Years	Released: 1997; Label: Okido Records
Greatest Hits: The Evidence	Released: August 8, 2000; Label: Atomic Pop
Westside	Released: 2002; Label: Priority
The Pimp Penal Code	Released: 2008; Label: Finallevel
Greatest Hits	Released: April 19, 2014; Label: Warner Bros.

=== Audio books ===
Title	Album details
The Ice Opinion	Released: 1994; Label: The Publishing Mills, Inc.

== Extended plays ==
Title	Album details
Ice-T Presents The West Coast Rydaz - What Really Goes On	Released: 1998; Label: Explicit Records

== Singles ==
=== As lead artist ===
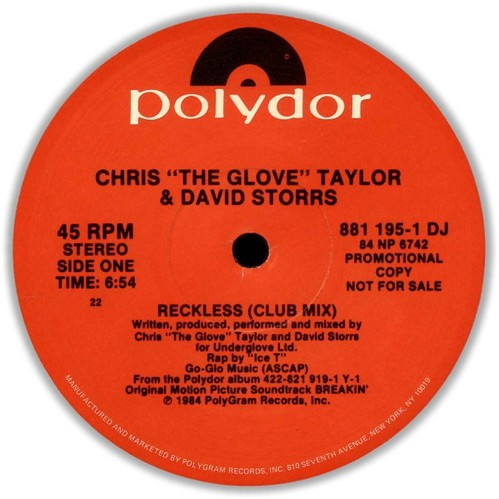
"Reckless" was one of Ice-T's early electro-influenced records that was featured on the Breakin' soundtrack.

Year	Title	Peak chart positions							Album
Year	Title	US Hot 100	US Rap	US R&B	US Dance	AUS	NZ	UK	Album
1983	"The Coldest Rap"/"Cold Wind Madness"	–	–	–	–	–	–	–	Non-album single
1983	"Body Rock"	–	–	–	–	–	–	–	Non-album single
1984	"Killers"	–	–	–	–	–	–	–	Non-album single
1984	"Reckless"	–	–	–	–	–	–	–	Breakin' (Soundtrack)
1985	"Ya Don't Quit"	–	–	–	–	–	–	–	Non-album single
1986	"Dog'n the Wax"/"6 'n the Mornin'"	–	–	–	–	–	–	–	Rhyme Pays
1987	"Make It Funky"	–	–	–	–	–	–	–	Rhyme Pays
1987	"Somebody Gotta Do It"	–	–	–	–	–	–	–	Rhyme Pays
1988	"Colors"	70	–	77	–	–	–	–	Colors (Soundtrack)
1988	"I'm Your Pusher"	–	–	13	21	–	17	–	Power
1988	"High Rollers"	–	9	76	–	–	38	63	Power
1989	"Heartbeat"	–	–	–	–	–	–	–	Power
1989	"Lethal Weapon"	–	12	–	–	161	22	98	The Iceberg/Freedom of Speech... Just Watch What You Say!
1989	"What Ya Wanna Do"	–	–	–	–	167	–	–	The Iceberg/Freedom of Speech... Just Watch What You Say!
1989	"The Girl Tried to Kill Me" (Promo)	–	–	–	–	–	–	–	The Iceberg/Freedom of Speech... Just Watch What You Say!
1990	"You Played Yourself"	–	–	–	–	–	–	64	The Iceberg/Freedom of Speech... Just Watch What You Say!
1990	"We're All in the Same Gang" (with West Coast All-Stars)	–	–	–	–	–	–	–	Non-album single
1990	"Dick Tracy"	–	–	–	–	–	–	–	Dick Tracy (Soundtrack)
1990	"Superfly 1990" (with Curtis Mayfield)	–	–	–	–	–	45	48	The Return of Superfly (Soundtrack)
1991	"New Jack Hustler (Nino's Theme)"	67	3	49	–	73	27	–	New Jack City (Soundtrack)
1991	"O.G. Original Gangster" (Platinum)	–	7	–	–	71	38	–	O.G. Original Gangster
1991	"Lifestyles of the Rich and Infamous"	–	–	–	–	168	–	–	O.G. Original Gangster
1991	"Ricochet"	–	–	–	–	–	–	–	Ricochet (Soundtrack)
1992	"Trespass" (with Ice Cube)	–	–	–	–	–	–	–	Trespass (soundtrack)
1993	"I Ain't New Ta This"	–	–	–	–	–	49	62	Home Invasion
1993	"That's How I'm Livin'"	–	–	–	–	56	–	21	Home Invasion
1994	"Gotta Lotta Love"	–	–	–	–	90	–	24	Home Invasion
1996	"I Must Stand"	–	21	83	–	75	–	23	Ice-T VI: Return of the Real
1996	"The Lane"	–	–	–	–	–	–	18	Ice-T VI: Return of the Real
1999	"Don't Hate the Playa"	–	–	–	–	–	–	–	The Seventh Deadly Sin
1999	"Always Wanted to Be a Hoe"	–	–	–	–	–	–	–	The Seventh Deadly Sin
1999	"Exodus" (Promo)	–	–	–	–	–	–	–	The Seventh Deadly Sin
1999	"Valuable Game" (Promo)	–	–	–	–	–	–	161	The Seventh Deadly Sin
2000	"Money, Power, Women"	–	–	–	–	–	–	–	Greatest Hits: The Evidence
2000	"Pimping Ain't Easy"	–	–	–	–	–	–	–	WWF Aggression
2002	"Police Story"	–	–	–	–	–	–	–	Rise Above
2003	"Get On Down"(featuring Xzibit, Kurupt, Mac Mall & King T)	–	–	–	–	–	–	–	Still More Bounce - A Tribute To Roger Troutman
2006	"Walking in the Rain"	–	–	–	–	–	–	–	Gangsta Rap
"—" denotes releases that did not chart or were not released.

=== As featured artist ===
Year	Title	Peak chart positions							Album
Year	Title	US Hot 100	US Rap	US R&B	US Dance	AUS	GER	UK	Album
1989	"Alice" (Hugh Harris featuring Ice-T)	–	–	–	–	–	–	–	Non-album single
1990	"The Rhythm" (Everlast featuring Donald D and Diva)	–	–	–	–	–	–	–	Forever Everlasting
1991	"Tip of the Iceberg" (Black Uhuru featuring Ice-T)	–	–	–	–	–	–	–	Iron Storm
1994	"Born to Raise Hell" (Motörhead featuring Ice-T and Whitfield Crane)	–	–	–	–	–	–	47	Airheads soundtrack
1996	"Afrika Jam" (Afrika Islam featuring Ice-T)	–	–	–	–	–	–	–	Non-album single
1998	"The Real One" (2 Live Crew featuring Ice-T)	–	9	60	–	–	–	–	The Real One
1998	"Suzy Rose" (DJ Polo featuring Ice-T)	–	–	–	–	–	–	–	Polo's Playhouse
1998	"Gettin' It On" (Players featuring Ice-T, Smoothe Da Hustler, Positive K)	–	–	–	–	–	–	–	Non-album single
2001	"The World Is a Ghetto" (Liroy featuring Ice-T)	–	–	–	–	–	–	–	Bestseller
2003	"Beat of Life" (DJ Tomekk featuring Ice-T, Sandra Nasić and Trigga Tha Gambla)	–	–	–	–	52	12	–	Beat of Life Vol. 1
2017	"Arctic II" (DJ Supreme featuring Ice-T and The Icepick)	–	–	–	–	–	–	–	
2022	"Night Stalkers" (Megadeth featuring Ice-T)	–	–	–	–	–	–	–	The Sick, the Dying... and the Dead!
2024	"Sucks 2 Suck" (Alpha Wolf featuring Ice-T)	–	–	–	–	–	–	–	Half Living Things

== Guest appearances ==
Title	Year	Other performer(s)	Album
"Lost in a Freestyle"	1989	Donald D	Notorious
"Back on the Block"	1989	Quincy Jones, Kool Moe Dee, Grandmaster Melle Mel, Big Daddy Kane	Back on the Block
"Last Wordz"	1993	2Pac, Ice Cube	Strictly 4 My N.I.G.G.A.Z...
"Put the Lights Out"	1994	Pro-Pain	The Truth Hurts
"Gangsta Team"	1994	South Central Cartel, 2Pac, MC Eiht, Spice 1	'N Gatz We Truss
"Sticka"	1994	Terminator X, Chuck D, MC Lyte, Ice Cube	Super Bad
"No Peace"	1995	South Central Cartel, Powerlord JEL, Spice 1, Ant Banks, Bo$$, Treach, Dori	Murder Squad Nationwide
"The Illusion of Power"	1995	Black Sabbath	Forbidden
"Where Ya At"	1995	Ice Cube, Kam, Mobb Deep, Da Smart, Insane, Shorty, Smooth B, Chuck D, RZA, Killah Priest	One Million Strong
"6 InaMornin"	1996	Born 2wice	Portrait of a $erial Player
"Loco"	1997	Frost	When Hell.A. Freezes Over
"Your Hustle Ain't On"	1997	Laylaw	The Lawhouse Experience, Volume One
"Gamblin' wit' Ice-T"	1997	Ant Banks	Big Thangs
"Secondz Away"	1997	Brotha Lynch Hung, First Degree	Loaded
"Choose Fee"	1997	H-Bomb	Narcissism
"Recognize Game"	1997	Spice 1, Too $hort	The Black Bossalini
"Big Playaz"	1997	PSK-13	Born Bad?
"Dead End"	1999	Insane Clown Posse	Psychopathics From Outerspace
"Ice-T Skit"	1999	Tash	Rap Life
"Roll wit Gee's"	2000	King George	Playas & Hustlas II
"One Bullet Left"	2001	Six Feet Under	True Carnage
"Colors 2000"	2001	187	Furious
"Underground Connections"	2001	Guru	Baldhead Slick & da Click
Hit Me Slime	2002	N.O.R.E.	God's Favorite
"Intro"	2002	King T	The Kingdom Come
"Politics of the Business"	2003	Prince Paul, Chuck D	Politics of the Business
"Coast 2 Coast"	2004	Triple Seis, Trigga tha Gambler	Only Time'll Tell
"Real Recognizes Real"	2006	Icepick	Violent Epiphany
"Freestyle"	2006	Kool Keith	Collabs Tape
"Shut Up, Be Happy" [P.A. Intro]"	2007	Megadeth, Jello Biafra	Eve-Olution
"Earl"	2008	E-40	The Ball Street Journal
"Turn Down for What (DJ Snake and Lil Jon cover)"	2014	Upon A Burning Body	Punk Goes Pop 6
"Un-Natural Disaster"	2018	Michael Ciravolo, Doug Pinnick	Finding Beauty In Chaos
"Evil Ways"	2018	Madball	For the Cause
"Celebrate"	2018	Boo-Yaa T.R.I.B.E., Kid Frost, Ice Cube, King Tee	Godfather's Top Picks
"Porn from Spain 3"	2019	Callejon, K.I.Z	Hartgeld im Club
"One Time"	2022	The Game	Drillmatic – Heart vs. Mind
"The Horns of Abraxas"	2022	Roc Marciano & Alchemist	The Elephant Man's Bones
"The Formula"	2023	Kool Keith	Black Elvis 2
"Sucks 2 Suck"	2024	Alpha Wolf	Half Living Things
"Here's Some Homicide"	2024	Czarface	Everybody Eats
"Nightmare Walking"	2026	D12, Xzibit	D12 Forever Vol. 1

== Soundtrack appearances ==
- "Reckless" (1984, from Breakin')
- "Colors" (1988, from Colors)
- "Dick Tracy" (1990, from Dick Tracy)
- "Superfly 1990" (1990, from The Return of Superfly)
- "New Jack Hustler" (1991, from New Jack City)
- "Ricochet" (1991, from Ricochet)
- "Trespass" (1992, from Trespass) [with Ice Cube]
- "Disorder" (1993, from Judgment Night) [with Slayer]
- "Born to Raise Hell" (1994, from Airheads) [with Motörhead, Whitfield Crane]
- "Big Gun" (1995, from Tank Girl)
- "How Does It Feel" (1996, from Original Gangstas)
- "Below Utopia: The Lost Score" (1998, unused musical score without vocals from Below Utopia)
- "Pimpin Ain't Easy" (Godfather) (2000, from WWF Aggression)
- "Get on Down" (2002, from Still More Bounce - A Tribute To Roger Troutman) [with Xzibit, Kurupt, Mac Mall and King T]

== Videography ==
=== Video albums ===
Title	Album details
The Iceberg Video	Released: 1989; Label: Sire/Warner Bros.
O.G. Original Gangster	Released: 1991; Label: Sire/Warner Bros.
The Repossession Live	Released: 2002; Label: STS Media/BMG/Image Entertainment
Body Count - Live in L.A.	Released: 2005; Label: Escapi Music
Smokeout Festival Presents: Body Count and Ice-T	Released: 2005; Label: Eagle Vision

=== Music videos ===
Year	Title	Director	Artist(s)
As main performer
1988	"Colors"		—N/a
1988	"I'm Your Pusher"	Howard Woffinden, Rick Elgood	Pimpin' Rex
1988	"High Rollers"	Mitchell Sinoway	—N/a
1989	"Lethal Weapon"	Ice-T, Mitchell Sinoway	—N/a
1989	"You Played Yourself"	Ice-T, Mitchell Sinoway	—N/a
1989	"What Ya Wanna Do?"		Rhyme $yndicate
1990	"Ricochet"		—N/a
1990	"Superfly 1990"		Curtis Mayfield
1991	"Home of the Bodybag"	Ice-T, Kenneth Doty	—N/a
1991	"First Impression"	Ice-T, Kenneth Doty	—N/a
1991	"Ziplock"	Ice-T, Kenneth Doty	—N/a
1991	"Mic Contract"	Ice-T, Kenneth Doty	Donald D
1991	"Mind Over Matter"	Ice-T, Kenneth Doty	—N/a
1991	"New Jack Hustler (Nino's Theme)"	Ice-T, Kenneth Doty	DJ Aladdin
1991	"Ed"	Ice-T, Kenneth Doty	—N/a
1991	"Bitches 2"	Ice-T, Kenneth Doty	Charlie Jam
1991	"Straight Up Nigga"	Ice-T, Kenneth Doty	DJ Aladdin
1991	"O.G. Original Gangster"	Ice-T, Kenneth Doty	—N/a
1991	"The House"	Ice-T, Kenneth Doty	—N/a
1991	"Evil E-What About Sex?"	Ice-T, Kenneth Doty	DJ Evil E
1991	"Fly By"	Ice-T, Kenneth Doty	Nat The Cat, Donald D
1991	"Midnight"	Ice-T, Kenneth Doty	Randy Mac
1991	"Fried Chicken"	Ice-T, Kenneth Doty	Prince Whipper Whip
1991	"Lifestyles of the Rich and Infamous"	Ice-T, Kenneth Doty	—N/a
1991	"Body Count"	Ice-T, Kenneth Doty	Body Count
1991	"Prepared to Die"	Ice-T, Kenneth Doty	—N/a
1991	"Escape From the Killing Fields"	Ice-T, Kenneth Doty	DJ Evil E
1991	"Street Killer"	Ice-T, Kenneth Doty	Special K
1991	"Pulse of the Rhyme"	Ice-T, Kenneth Doty	—N/a
1991	"The Tower"	Ice-T, Kenneth Doty	Sean E Sean, Al Patrome & Mello
1991	"Ya Shoulda Killed Me Last Year/M.V.P.s"	Ice-T, Kenneth Doty	—N/a
1992	"Trespass"		Ice Cube
1993	"I Ain't New Ta This"		—N/a
1993	"G Style"		—N/a
1993	"Gotta Lotta Love"		—N/a
1993	"That's How I'm Livin'"		—N/a
1996	"I Must Stand"		San Man, Angela Rollins
1999	"Always Wanted To Be A Ho"	Albert Pyun	Ice's Ho
2006	"Walking In The Rain"		—N/a
As featured performer
1990	"The Rhythm"		Everlast, Donald D, Diva
1990	"We're All In The Same Gang"		The West Coast All-Stars
1992	"Body Count's in the House"		Body Count
1992	"The Winner Loses"		Body Count
1992	"There Goes the Neighborhood"		Body Count
1993	"Don't Call Me Nigger, Whitey"	Perry Farrell, Casey Niccoli	Body Count, Jane's Addiction
1994	"Born to Raise Hell"		Motörhead, Whitfield Crane
1994	"Born Dead"		Body Count
1994	"Hey Joe"		Body Count
1994	"Necessary Evil"		Body Count
1994	"Medley"		Body Count
1995	"No Peace"		South Central Cartel, Powerlord JEL, Bo$$, Spice 1, Ant Banks, Treach
1995	"Where Ya At?"		Ice Cube, Kam, Mobb Deep, Da Smart, Insane, Shorty, Smooth B, Chuck D, RZA, Killah Priest
1996	"Afrika Jam"		Afrika Islam
1997	"I Used to Love Her"		Body Count
1998	"The Real One"		2 Live Crew
2000	"Pimp"		Jay Capone
2001	"The World Is a Ghetto"		Liroy
2002	"The Fifth Element"		The Legends of Hip Hop
2003	"The Beat of Life"		DJ Tomekk, Trigga Tha Gambla, Sandra Nasić
2006	"Relationships"		Body Count
2007	"Black Ice"		Black Ice, Marc Live, Fedie Demarco
2007	"So Fly"		Black Ice
2008	"Hood Technology"		Black Ice, RBX
2008	"Ayayaya"		F.I.L.T.H.E.E., Grandmaster Caz
2008	"Earl"		E-40
2009	"Chevy 6'4"		Black Ice, Fedie Demarco, Tash
2011	"Cake"		Certified
2014	"Talk Shit, Get Shot"		Body Count
2014	"Turn Down for What"		Upon a Burning Body
2015	"Institutionalized"		Body Count
2017	"Black Hoody"		Body Count
2017	"No Lives Matter"		Body Count
2017	"Raining In Blood / Postmortem"		Body Count
Cameo appearances
1984	"Don't Waste Your Time"		Yarbrough and Peoples
1989	"F.B.I."		Donald D
1989	"Pay Ya Dues"		Low Profile
1990	"I Got That Knack"		Everlast
1991	"At Your Own Risk"		King Tee
1992	"Gotta Get Over"		Gang Starr
1993	"Who's The Man?"		House of Pain
1993	"Hittin' Switches"		Eric Sermon
1996	"Big Time"		Ultra
1998	"Ghetto Fabulous"		Ras Kass, Dr. Dre, Mack 10
2000	"Lovačke Priče"		Sick Rhyme Sayaaz
2001	"Fight Music"		D12
2006	"The Funhouse Adventure"		Dynamax, Donald D
2007	"Still In Love With You"		Five A.M., Rumer Willis, Edward Furlong
2009	"The Legacy"		Deams
2011	"Welcome To California"		40 Glocc, E-40, Snoop Dogg, Too Short, Xzibit, Sevin
2011	"Flags"		Naughty By Nature, Bilal, Jaheim
2011	"The Funhouse Adventure (DJ Sound Mix)"		The Bronx Syndicate
2012	"O.G. Brandy"		Kmaculent
2012	"Smoovin"		KnightPKF, Bonkaz
2012	"109 MC's"		Smoothe Da Hustler
2014	"6 AM"		Papoose, Jadakiss, Jim Jones

== See also ==
- Body Count Discography
