= What Ya Wanna Do =

Single by Ice-T

from the album The Iceberg/Freedom of Speech... Just Watch What You Say!
- B-side: "The Girl Tried To Kill Me"
- Released: 1989
- Studio: Syndicate Studios West (Los Angeles, CA); Wide Tracks (Los Angeles, CA)
- Genre: Hip hop
- Length: 8:56 (LP version); 4:20 (edited)
- Label: Sire Records
- Songwriters: Tracy Lauren Marrow; Bob Khalil; Mark Richardson; Donald Lamont; Erik Francis Schrody; Henry D. Garcia; Todd Howard; Charles Andre Glenn; Harry Wayne Casey; Richard Finch
- Producer: Afrika Islam

Ice-T singles chronology
"Lethal Weapon" (1989)	"What Ya Wanna Do" (1989)	"You Played Yourself" (1990)

Music video
- "What Ya Wanna Do" on YouTube

"What Ya Wanna Do?" is a single by American recording artist Ice-T from his third studio album The Iceberg/Freedom of Speech...Just Watch What You Say. It was released in 1989 via Sire Records. The song served as a posse cut and featured several artists from hip hop collective Rhyme Syndicate: Bronx Style Bob, Divine Styler, Donald D, Everlast, Hen-Gee, M.C. Taste, Nat The Cat, Randy Mac, Shakell Shabazz, Toddy Tee, and DJ Evil E. It was produced and programmed by Afrika Islam and co-produced and arranged by Ice-T himself for Rhyme Syndicate Productions. The song was recorded at Syndicate Studios West & Wide Tracks, in Los Angeles, California, and mastered at Future Disc Systems, also in L.A.

The length of the original song is 8 minutes and 56 second on the LP version, while the edited version of the song shortened to 4 minutes and 20 seconds, and its instrumental version is 4 minutes and 45 seconds long.

B-side of the 12", vinyl single is another song from The Iceberg/Freedom of Speech... Just Watch What You Say! titled "The Girl Tried To Kill Me", which was also released the same year as a one-song promotional CDS.

In the "What Ya Wanna Do" music video, all the featured rappers spit verses by turn, recording their posse cut in the studio.

The song contains a sample from "Do You Wanna Go Party" as written by Harry Wayne Casey and Richard Finch and performed by KC and the Sunshine Band on their sixth studio album Do You Wanna Go Party.

== Track listing ==
Adapted from Discogs

CD single, promo
No.	Title	Length
1.	"What Ya Wanna Do" (Edit)	4:20
2.	"What Ya Wanna Do" (Instrumental)	4:45

12", vinyl, 33 ⅓ RPM, maxi-single
No.	Title	Length
1.	"What Ya Wanna Do" (Edit)	4:20
2.	"What Ya Wanna Do" (Instrumental)	4:45
3.	"What Ya Wanna Do" (LP Version)	8:56
4.	"The Girl Tried To Kill Me" (Radio Remix)	4:26

== Personnel ==
- Eric 'DJ Evil E' Garcia – turntables
- Ernie C – guitar
- Mooseman (credited as Lloyd) – bass
- Charles Andre Glenn – programming, production
- Jorge Hinojosa – management
- Karen Jones – A&R
- Tracy Lauren Marrow – arrangement, production
- Aaron Rapoport – photography

== Charts ==
Chart (1990)	Peak position
Australia (ARIA)	167
