= Lethal Weapon (song) =

Single by Ice-T

from the album The Iceberg/Freedom of Speech... Just Watch What You Say!
- B-side: "Heartbeat"; "This One's For Me"
- Released: September 21, 1989
- Studio: Syndicate Studios West (Los Angeles, CA); Wide Tracks (Los Angeles, CA)
- Genre: Gangsta rap
- Length: 4:35
- Label: Sire
- Songwriter(s): Tracy Lauren Marrow; Charles Andre Glenn
- Producer(s): Afrika Islam; Ice-T

Ice-T singles chronology
"High Rollers" (1988)	"Lethal Weapon" (1989)	"What Ya Wanna Do?" (1989)

Music video
- "Lethal Weapon" on YouTube

"Lethal Weapon" is a song by American recording artist Ice-T. It was released on September 21, 1989 as a single from the rapper's third studio album The Iceberg/Freedom of Speech...Just Watch What You Say through Sire Records. The song was written and produced by Ice-T and Afrika Islam, who used a sample from Little Royal and The Swingmasters' "Razor Blade". The single peaked at number 22 in New Zealand and number 98 in the UK.

== Track listing ==
7", cassette
No.	Title	Writer(s)	Producer(s)	Length
1.	"Lethal Weapon" (LP Version)	T. Marrow	Afrika Islam; Ice-T	4:35
2.	"Heartbeat (Remix Edit)" (featuring WAR)	T. Marrow; C. Glenn; M. Dickerson; C. Miller; H. Brown; H. Scott; L. Oskar; L. Jordan; T. Allen	Afrika Islam; Ice-T; Jerry Goldstein	4:10

12", Maxi single
No.	Title	Writer(s)	Producer(s)	Length
1.	"Lethal Weapon" (LP Version)	T. Marrow	Afrika Islam; Ice-T	4:35
2.	"Lethal Weapon" (Instrumental)	T. Marrow	Afrika Islam; Ice-T	4:35
3.	"This One's For Me" (LP Version)	T. Marrow	Afrika Islam; Ice-T	4:35
4.	"Heartbeat (12" Remix)" (featuring WAR)	T. Marrow; C. Glenn; M. Dickerson; C. Miller; H. Brown; H. Scott; L. Oskar; L. Jordan; T. Allen	Afrika Islam; Ice-T; Jerry Goldstein	7:52

== Personnel ==
- Tracy Lauren Marrow – lyrics, vocals, producer, arranging
- Charles Andre Glenn – producer, programming
- Gerald "Jerry" Goldstein – producer on "Heartbeat (Remix)"
- Mark Wolfson – engineering on "Heartbeat (Remix)"
- Eric Garcia – scratches
- Bilal Bashir – editor

== Chart positions ==
Chart (1989)	Peak position
Australia (ARIA)	161
New Zealand (Recorded Music NZ)	49
UK Singles (OCC)	62
US Hot Rap Songs (Billboard)	12
