= You Played Yourself =

Single by Ice-T

from the album The Iceberg/Freedom of Speech... Just Watch What You Say!
- B-side: "Freedom Of Speech"; "My Word Is Bond"
- Released: April 5, 1990
- Recorded: 1989
- Studio: Syndicate Studios West (Los Angeles, CA); Wide Tracks (Los Angeles, CA)
- Genre: West Coast hip hop; gangsta rap
- Length: 4:12
- Label: Sire Records
- Songwriters: Tracy Lauren Marrow; Charles Andre Glenn; James Brown; Fred Wesley; Charles A. Bobbit
- Producers: Afrika Islam; Ice-T

Ice-T singles chronology
"What Ya Wanna Do" (1989)	"You Played Yourself" (1990)	"Dick Tracy" (1990)

Music video
- "You Played Yourself" on YouTube

"You Played Yourself" is a song performed by American recording artist Ice-T. It was released on April 5, 1990, as a single from the rapper's third studio album The Iceberg/Freedom of Speech...Just Watch What You Say through Sire Records. The song was written and produced by Ice-T and Afrika Islam, who sampled James Brown's "The Boss", which was written by James Brown, Charles Bobbit and Fred Wesley. The single peaked at number 64 in the UK.

== Background ==
The song tells details several failures through hubris. One goes uneducated thinking he is a gangster when really he is nothing. Another is a rapper who offends his fans because he thinks he is above them but they turn on him - he is left unemployed with no one because he has offended them all. Another is a drug addict, paranoid and doesn't eat. He rips off his family for drug money and they disown him. He then tries to do an armed robbery to get money but accidentally kills someone and ends up on death row.

== Track listing ==
7" (UK version)
No.	Title	Writer(s)	Producer(s)	Length
1.	"You Played Yourself"	T. Marrow; C. Glenn; J. Brown; C. Bobbit; F. Wesley	Afrika Islam; Ice-T
2.	"My Word Is Bond"	T. Marrow; C. Glenn	Afrika Islam; Ice-T

12", Maxi single (UK version)
No.	Title	Writer(s)	Producer(s)	Length
1.	"You Played Yourself" (Remix)	T. Marrow; C. Glenn; J. Brown; C. Bobbit; F. Wesley	Afrika Islam; Ice-T
2.	"You Played Yourself" (Instrumental)(Remix)	T. Marrow; C. Glenn; J. Brown; C. Bobbit; F. Wesley	Afrika Islam; Ice-T
3.	"You Played Yourself" (LP Version)	T. Marrow; C. Glenn; J. Brown; C. Bobbit; F. Wesley	Afrika Islam; Ice-T
4.	"Freedom Of Speech" (featuring Jello Biafra)	T. Marrow	Afrika Islam; Ice-T

12", Maxi single
No.	Title	Writer(s)	Producer(s)	Length
1.	"You Played Yourself"	T. Marrow; C. Glenn; J. Brown; C. Bobbit; F. Wesley	Afrika Islam; Ice-T	4:12
2.	"Freedom Of Speech" (featuring Jello Biafra)	T. Marrow	Afrika Islam; Ice-T	4:10
3.	"You Played Yourself" (Remix)	T. Marrow	Afrika Islam; Ice-T; DJ Aladdin (add.); King Tee (add.)	5:10
4.	"You Played Yourself" (Dub)	T. Marrow	Afrika Islam; Ice-T; DJ Aladdin (add.); King Tee (add.)	4:30

== Personnel ==
- Tracy Lauren Marrow – lyrics, vocals, producer, arranging
- Eric Reed Boucher – guest vocals on "Freedom Of Speech"
- Eric Garcia – scratches
- Charles Andre Glenn – producer, programming
- Alphonso Henderson – additional producer (re-mixing)
- Roger McBride – additional producer (re-mixing)
- Tom Baker – mastering
- Glen E. Friedman – photography
- Frank Mike Jones – photography

== Chart positions ==
Chart (1990)	Peak position
UK Singles (Official Charts)	64
