= Colors (soundtrack) =

Soundtrack album by Various artists
- Released: April 26, 1988
- Recorded: 1987–1988
- Genres: Contemporary R&B; hip hop
- Length: 44:51
- Label: Warner Bros. Records
- Producers: Benny Medina (exec.); Dennis Hopper (exec.); Marley Marl; Afrika Islam; Decadent Dub Team; Eric B; Hurby Luv Bug; Ice-T; Johnny Rivers; Rakim; Rick James

Warner Bros. soundtrack albums chronology
Full Metal Jacket OST (1987)	Colors (1988)	Bright Lights, Big City OST (1988)

Singles from Colors
- 1. "Colors" Released: 1988

Professional ratings
Review scores
Source	Rating
Allmusic	3/5 stars
Robert Christgau	(B+)

Colors is the soundtrack album to the Dennis Hopper-directed 1988 action crime film Colors. It was released on April 26, 1988 via Warner Bros. Records and mostly consisted of hip hop music. The album found success, peaking at number 31 on the Billboard 200 and was certified gold on July 12, 1988, but it is best remembered for its title track performed by Ice-T. The single wasn't a huge success on the charts, only making it to #70 on the Billboard Hot 100, although it was later ranked the 19th best hip-hop song of all time by VH1 in 2008. The second song on the album, "Six Gun" by Decadent Dub Team was remixed for the album by Dr. Dre of NWA.

== Track listing ==
No.	Title	Writer(s)	Producer(s)	Length
1.	"Colors" (performed by Ice-T)	C. Glenn; T. Marrow	Afrika Islam; Ice-T	4:25
2.	"Six Gun (44Mag Mix)" (performed by The Decadent Dub Team)	D. Williams; J. Liles; P. Quigg	Decadent Dub Team	4:57
3.	"Let the Rhythm Run" (performed by Salt-n-Pepa)	H. Azor	Hurby Luv Bug	3:22
4.	"Raw" (performed by Big Daddy Kane)	A. Hardy; M. Williams	Marley Marl	4:06
5.	"Paid in Full (Coldcut Remix)" (performed by Eric B. & Rakim)	E. Barrier; W. Griffin	Eric B. & Rakim	7:07
6.	"Butcher Shop" (performed by Kool G Rap)	M. Williams; N. Wilson	Marley Marl	3:44
7.	"Mad Mad World" (performed by The 7A3)	B. Bouldin; J. Rivers; S. Bouldin	Johnny Rivers; Mark Wolfson (co.)	4:48
8.	"Go on, Girl" (performed by Roxanne Shanté)	A. Hardy	Marley Marl	3:03
9.	"A Mind is a Terrible Thing to Waste" (performed by MC Shan)	M. Williams; S. Moltke	Marley Marl	4:28
10.	"Everywhere I Go (Colors)" (performed by Rick James)	R. James	Rick James	4:34
Total length:				44:51

== Personnel ==
- Benny Medina – executive producer
- Dennis Hopper – executive producer
- Steve Hall – mastering
- Gary Goetzman – music supervisor
- Sharon Boyle – music supervisor
- Deborah Norcross – art direction & design
- Jeri Heiden – art direction
- David Skernick – photography
- Merrick Morton – photography

== Certifications ==
Region	Certification	Certified units/sales
United States (RIAA)	Gold	500,000^{^}
^{^} Shipments figures based on certification alone.
