= The Iceberg/Freedom of Speech... Just Watch What You Say! =

Studio album by Ice-T
- Released: October 10, 1989
- Genre: West Coast hip-hop; hardcore hip-hop; gangsta rap
- Length: 55:42
- Label: Sire
- Producer: Ice-T; Afrika Islam

Ice-T chronology
Power (1988)	The Iceberg/Freedom of Speech... Just Watch What You Say! (1989)	O.G. Original Gangster (1991)

Singles from The Iceberg/Freedom of Speech...Just Watch What You Say
- 1. "Lethal Weapon" Released: 1989; 2. "What Ya Wanna Do" Released: 1989; 3. "You Played Yourself" Released: April 5, 1990

Professional ratings
Review scores
Source	Rating
AllMusic	5/5 stars
Chicago Tribune	3/4 stars
The Rolling Stone Album Guide	4/5 stars
Spin Alternative Record Guide	9/10
The Village Voice	A−

The Iceberg/Freedom of Speech... Just Watch What You Say! is the third studio album by American rapper Ice-T, released on October 10, 1989, by Sire Records. The album has an uncharacteristically gritty sound, featuring some of the darkest tracks that Ice-T ever released. The Iceberg also contains the recorded debut of Ice-T's heavy metal band Body Count who perform on three songs.

== Background ==
The album was released after Ice-T was encountering censorship problems on tour. In The Ice Opinion: Who Gives a Fuck? the rapper states that "People had already told me what I could not say onstage in Columbus, Georgia. You couldn't say anything they called a 'swear' word. You couldn't touch yourself. They were using the same tactics they used on everyone from Elvis and Jim Morrison to 2 Live Crew".

The album's cover, featuring a B-boy with a shotgun shoved in his mouth, and two pistols pressed against each side of his head, reflected Ice-T's experiences with the concept of freedom of speech. "The concept of that picture is, 'Go ahead and say what you want. But here comes the government and here come the parents, and they are ready to destroy you when you open your mouth'".

== Accompanying VHS ==
The album was accompanied by a VHS entitled The Iceberg. This mixed footage of Ice-T's gigs with his own commentary. In the first section, he said that some of the footage was of poor quality because it was filmed on equipment from a pawnbroker or stolen from a mall. The video featured some footage of the Dope Jam tour, including Doug E Fresh, KRS-One and Kool Moe Dee.

== Track listing ==
No.	Title	Length
1.	"Shut Up, Be Happy" (featuring Jello Biafra)	2:36
2.	"The Iceberg"	4:21
3.	"Lethal Weapon"	4:33
4.	"You Played Yourself"	4:14
5.	"Peel Their Caps Back"	3:42
6.	"The Girl Tried to Kill Me"	4:10
7.	"Black 'n' Decker"	1:16
8.	"Hit the Deck"	3:46
9.	"This One's for Me"	4:33
10.	"The Hunted Child"	4:27
11.	"What Ya Wanna Do?" (featuring Bronx Style Bob, Donald D, Everlast, Hen Gee, Nat The Cat, Randy Mac, Shakell Shabazz, Toddy Tee, MC Taste, and Divine Styler.)	8:57
12.	"Freedom of Speech" (featuring Jello Biafra)	4:11
13.	"My Word Is Bond"	5:07
Total length:		55:42

Sample credits

- "Shut Up, Be Happy" contains a sample of "Black Sabbath" performed by Black Sabbath.
- "Hit the Deck" contains a sample of "Coonskin No More" performed by Scatman Crothers.
- "The Hunted Child" contains a sample of "Bring the Noise" performed by Public Enemy.
- "My Word Is Bond" contains a sample of "La Di Da Di" performed by Slick Rick.

=== Personnel ===
- Afrika Islam - producer, programming (tracks 1, 3–13)
- Arnold Turner - photographer
- Beat Master V - drums (track 6)
- Devious Doze - artwork
- D.J. Evil "E" The Great - scratches
- Ernie C - guitar (track 6, 11)
- Ice-T - main artist, executive producer, producer
- Johnny (Sleepy John) Rivers - programming (track 2)
- Lloyd Roberts - bass (tracks 8, 11)
- Mark Wolfson - engineer mix
- Mary Ann Dibs - design
- Vachik Aghaniawtz - engineer mix

== Charts ==
Chart (1989)	Peak position
Australian Albums (ARIA Charts)	81
US Billboard 200	37
US Top R&B/Hip-Hop Albums (Billboard)	11

== Certifications ==
Region	Certification	Certified units/sales
Canada (Music Canada)	Gold	50,000^{^}
United States (RIAA)	Gold	500,000^{^}
^{^} Shipments figures based on certification alone.
