= 6 in the Mornin' =

Single by Ice-T

from the album Rhyme Pays
- A-side: "Dog 'n the Wax (Ya Don't Quit-Part II)"
- Released: 1986
- Genre: Gangsta rap
- Length: 3:45 (original B-side); 7:11 (extended album version)
- Label: Techno Hop Records; Sire/Warner Bros. (re-release)
- Songwriters: Andre Pierre; Ice-T
- Producer: The Unknown DJ

Ice-T singles chronology
"Ya Don't Quit" (1985)	"6 in the Mornin'" (1986)	"Colors" (1988)

"6 in the Mornin'" is a song by American rapper Ice-T. Released in 1986 as the B-side of "Dog 'n the Wax (Ya Don't Quit-Part II)", the song is considered to be one of the defining tracks of the gangsta rap genre. It also appeared (as "6 'N the Mornin'") on Ice T's debut album Rhyme Pays in 1987. The song was produced by Compton's Most Wanted associate the Unknown DJ.

"Midnight", from Ice T's 1991 album O.G. Original Gangster, is a prequel of this song. "Midnight" ends with the lyric "looked at my watch, it was six in the morning", and "6 in the Mornin'" opens with the lyric "six in the morning, police at my door."

A version of the song was later recorded by the Tennessee horrorcore group Three 6 Mafia on its Chapter 2: World Domination album, and was aptly renamed "3-6 in the Mornin'" and features occasional samples from the original. The song was re-recorded by Ice T for the 2020 Body Count album Carnivore.

In the documentary series Hip-Hop Evolution, Ice-T explains that he was inspired by the rapper Schoolly D and his 1985 song P.S.K.
