= Sevin (rapper) =

American rapper

- Born: Marques Adams; November 14, 1981 (age 44); San Jose, California
- Origin: Sacramento, California
- Genres: Christian hip hop, gangsta rap
- Occupations: Singer, songwriter
- Instruments: Vocals, guitar, piano
- Years active: 1999–present
- Labels: God Over Money, Hog Mob
- Website: hogmob.com godovermoney.com

Marques Adams (born November 14, 1981), who goes by the stage name Sevin, is an American Christian hip hop rapper. He has released over 20 studio albums. Commissary was his breakthrough release on the Billboard magazine charts.

== Early life ==
Marques Adams was born on November 14, 1981, in San Jose, California, the son of Tracy and Debra Adams (née; Pflugrad), where his two younger siblings were born, Danielle and Justus. They were raised in Sacramento, California, a place he considers to be his hometown. His parents run a ministry there.

== Music career ==
Sevin's music recording career began in 1999, and he subsequently released over 20 studio albums He also released two mixtapes, Nine 1 Sikk Mixtape volume 2 : City Of Kingz in 2006 and 9 1 Sikk Mixtape volume 3: Hunterz Moon in 2007; and a greatest hits album, Street Legal, in 2006.

The album All or None was reviewed by Cross Rhythms magazine and Gospelflava. Finally Home was reviewed by Indie Vision Music. The album Commissary charted on the Billboard magazine Gospel Albums chart at No. 22.

Bizzle signed Sevin to a recording contract with God Over Money Records in 2016.

The acronym HOG MOB means "Hooked On God, Ministry Ova Business."

Purple Heart charted on four Billboard magazine charts, Christian Albums, Rap Albums, Independent Albums, and Heatseekers Albums, where it peaked at Nos. 13, 19, 37, and 5, correspondingly.

His return to the music scene after a 7 year hiatus was a collaboration with Bizzy Cardoza a Phoenix rapper and Producer on a song and video entitled “Grave 2 The Cradle”.

== Ministry ==
Sevin wants to utilize his Christian hip hop to impact the urban communities of the United States with the gospel message.

== Discography ==
Studio albums

- All or None (1999 and 2001)
- Evin Angelz Kry (2004)
- Holy Mictramony (2004 and 2006)
- Feel me... (2004 and 2006)
- Father Forgive Me (2005)
- Sevin presentz: Hog Life: The LP (2005 and 2006)
- Work of Art: The R&B EP (2007)
- B 4 I Wake (2007)
- We Die (2007)
- Str8 frum tha Dragonz Mouth (2008)
- Unreleased aka Rezin (2010)
- HOG MOB: Tha LP (2008)
- Faith, Love & Lust (2009)
- Finally Home (2010)
- Finally Home Vol. 2 (2011)
- Purple Reign (2011)
- Commissary (2013)
- Pray 4 My Hood (2015)
- I'll Wait (2015)
- Purple Heart (2016)
- Rather Die Than Deny (2018)
- 4eva Mobn (2018)
- Ghetto Gospel, Vol. 3 (2019)
- Mozes (2025)

Mixtapes

- HOG MOB Mixtape Vol. 1 Genesis
- Nine 1 Sikk Mixtape volume 2: City Of Kingz (2006)
- 9 1 Sikk Mixtape volume 3: Hunterz Moon (2007)
- 91 Sikk Mixtape volume 4: Kakoon (2008)
- HOGMOB Muzik Presentz: Freedom (2009)

Featured singles

- "Go For Mine ft. Jay Rich" NBA 2K7
- "Welcome to California" by 40 Glocc ft. Snoop Dogg, Too Short, Xzibit and Sevin (2010)
