= Below Utopia =

- Film poster
- Directed by: Kurt Voss
- Written by: Richard Shepard; David Diamond
- Produced by: Lisa M. Hansen; Paul Hertzberg; Alyssa Milano
- Starring: Justin Theroux; Alyssa Milano; Ice-T; Tommy 'Tiny' Lister
- Production company: Subutopian Films
- Distributed by: CineTel Films
- Release date: September 26, 1997
- Running time: 88 minutes
- Country: United States
- Language: English

Below Utopia (also known as Body Count) is a 1997 American independent crime-drama/thriller film directed by Kurt Voss. The movie stars Justin Theroux, Alyssa Milano and Ice-T. Milano was also the executive producer of the film.

Ice-T had composed an instrumental musical score for this film that was not used. The compositions instead appeared on a CD entitled "Below Utopia: The Lost Score".

== Plot ==
Daniel returns to his family's mansion for the holidays along with his girlfriend Susanne. His family's seemingly utopian existence is overshadowed by not only the death of Daniel's brother, but also by Daniel's failure to live up to his brother's potential. However, this quickly becomes inconsequential, as blood-thirsty killers soon show up to steal the artwork, and whatever else they can find in the house. As the family members are killed, Daniel flees with Susanne in the basement, hoping for survival. Daniel reveals that he not only knows the blood-thirsty killers and is in on the whole thing, but was also responsible for the death of his brother. Daniel kills all the "art thieves" and starts to stage the scene when one of his siblings "rises from the dead" to foil his plan. He is caught in the act of trying to strangle him by Susanne and what ensues is a battle not only for her life, but the life of his last-surviving family member.

== Release ==
The video release was on March 17, 1998. The DVD release was followed on October 23, 2001. Below Utopia is also one of the films on a two-pack DVD, the other being Out-of-Sync.

As of 2025, the film is available to stream on the Starz Apple TV Channel, Amazon Video, the Plex Player, the Plex streaming service and Philo, in which the current rights to it are held by Lionsgate.

== Cast ==
- Alyssa Milano as Susanne
- Justin Theroux as Daniel Beckett
- Ice-T as Jim
- Tommy 'Tiny' Lister as "Tiny"
- Robert Pine as Uncle Wilson
- Marta Kristen as Marilyn Beckett
