= Hugh Harris (singer) =

English musician (1964–2019)

- Born: Hugh Albert Harris; 2 August 1964; London, England
- Died: 1 January 2019 (aged 54)
- Genres: Pop, Rock, Funk, Soul, R&B
- Occupations: Singer, musician, songwriter
- Instruments: Vocals, Piano, Guitar
- Years active: 1989–2002, 2013–2018
- Label: Capitol Records (1989) / Airwave (2002) / Not Them Again Music (2013)

Hugh Albert Harris (2 August 1964 – 1 January 2019) was an English musician, most known for his song "Rhythm of Life".

== Career ==
Hugh Harris was born in London in 1964. He released his first album, Words for Our Years in 1989, that featured his only hit "Rhythm of Life"; it was featured in the film Uncle Buck. In July 1990, "Rhythm of Life" peaked at No. 92 in the UK Singles Chart. His first album garnered critical acclaim, and Harris' style was compared to Prince, Terence Trent D'arby and female vocalist Tracy Chapman.

In the late 1980s and early 1990s, Harris was in a low-key relationship with Sinéad O'Connor. His song "Seven Days" was on the soundtrack for Kalifornia, and was subsequently included on his 2002 album Flowers.

Throat cancer caused Harris to disappear from the music scene soon after his success, thus stalling what could be regarded as a promising musical career.

Harris emerged from a 12-year hiatus, in 2002, to release, Flowers, an album originally recorded in 1992 before throat cancer forced him to retreat from music. He has worked with Ice-T, Wendy Melvoin (of Wendy & Lisa), Amp Fiddler, record producers Gary Katz and David Z, and Planet Funk.

In September 2013, two albums were released via iTunes. These albums, titled The Captain's Tales Vol 1 & 2, were released on his own label 'Not Them Again Music', and brought to an end an 11-year musical hiatus.

Hugh Harris died of cancer on 1 January 2019. His humanist funeral was held at the West London Crematorium in Kensal Green, London. His song "Flowers" was played.

== Album discography ==
- 1989: Words for Our Years - Capitol Records
- 2002: Flowers (recorded in 1992) - Airwave
- 2013: The Captain's Tale, Vol. 1 - Not Them Again Music
- 2013: The Captain's Tale, Vol. 2 - Not Them Again Music
