= Afrika Islam =

American hip hop DJ and producer (born 1967)

- Birth name: Charles Andre Glenn
- Also known as: Mr. X
- Born: June 19, 1967 (age 57); The Bronx, New York City, U.S.
- Genres: Hip hop; gangsta rap
- Occupations: DJ; record producer
- Labels: Rhyme $yndicate; Sire; Warner Bros.
- Formerly of: Rock Steady Crew

Charles Andre Glenn (born June 19, 1967 in The Bronx, New York), professionally known by his stage name Afrika Islam, is an American hip hop DJ and producer. He was one of the pioneers of hip hop culture and the hip hop radio station.

He began his musical career in 1977 as a ten-year-old, joining the group Rock Steady Crew. He started as an apprentice to Afrika Bambaataa, from whom he learned the art of remixing tracks. He was responsible for the events that the Zulu Nation held during the 1970s. A few years later, he moved to Los Angeles where he began working with Ice-T, for whom he produced four gold albums, all of which were released on Sire Records. He went on to remix artists including Michael Jackson and New Order.

Originally, he held the esteemed title of the 13th b-boy within the Zulu Kings. Pioneering the hip-hop movement, he launched the inaugural radio program dedicated to the genre, Zulu Beats, broadcasting on WHBI - FM 105.9 in 1981. Following his radio tenure, he joined forces with the Supreme Team for a period. His acclaim soared in 1983 when he emerged victorious in the NMS DJ championship, Battle For World Supremacy. Later in the 1980s, he co-founded Rhyme Syndicate Records alongside Ice-T. Transitioning into the late 1990s, he collaborated with WestBam on the dynamic electro project known as Mr. X & Mr. Y.

Afrika Islam is also known for compositions that he wrote for the Soul Sonic Force and his own group called Funk Machine. For two years he hosted the radio program Zulu Beats. In his career as a DJ, he was famous for the art of mixing on four turntables simultaneously. He worked as a DJ and MC for the Rock Steady Crew.

In 1997 he released the EP Afrika Jam, which AllMusic rated 3/5.

In Europe, he is known for his performances in duet with Westbam during big techno festivals such as Mayday and Soundtropolis. He also recorded a song from the Polish duo of DJ State Kalwi & Remi.

== Notable production discography ==
Albums

- 1987:
  - Ice-T – Rhyme Pays
- 1988:
  - Ice-T – Power
  - Colors (soundtrack)
  - Rhyme $yndicate - Rhyme Syndicate Comin' Through
- 1989:
  - Ice-T – The Iceberg/Freedom of Speech... Just Watch What You Say!
  - Donald D – Notorious
- 1991:
  - Ice-T – O.G. Original Gangster

Singles

- 1986:
  - Afrika & The Zulu Kings – "The Beach"
- 1987:
  - Afrika & The Zulu Kings – "Cars"
  - Ice-T – "Make It Funky"
- 1988:
  - Ice-T – "I'm Your Pusher"
  - Ice-T – "Colors"
  - Toddy Tee – "I Need a Rolex"
- 1989:
  - Ice-T – "Lethal Weapon"
  - Ice-T – "High Rollers"
  - Donald D – "F.B.I."
  - Ice-T – "You Played Yourself"
  - Ice-T – "Dick Tracy"
  - Ice-T & Rhyme Syndicate – "What Ya Wanna Do?"
- 1997:
  - Tricky – "Makes Me Wanna Die"
