= Rhyme Pays =

Studio album by Ice-T
- Released: July 28, 1987
- Recorded: 1986–87
- Genre: West Coast hip-hop; hardcore hip hop; gangsta rap
- Length: 44:55
- Label: Sire
- Producer: Afrika Islam

Ice-T chronology
| Rhyme Pays (1987) | Power (1988) |

Singles from Rhyme Pays
- 1. "6 'N The Mornin'" Released: 1986; 2. "Make It Funky" Released: 1987; 3. "Somebody Gotta Do It (Pimpin' Ain't Easy)" Released: 1987

Rhyme Pays is the debut studio album by American rapper Ice-T, released on July 28, 1987, by Sire Records. The album peaked at number 93 on the US Billboard 200 and number 23 on the Top R&B/Hip-Hop Albums charts, and was certified gold by the Recording Industry Association of America (RIAA).

== Music and lyrics ==
The album, especially tracks like "6 In the Morning", is considered to have defined the gangsta rap genre. Ice-T claims that this would be his first hip hop album to be carrying a parental advisory warning label, although, it was years before the industry-standard explicit-lyrics sticker was developed and Too $hort's first album that also had to be carried with an "Explicit Lyrics" warning back in 1985. The 1988 CD release included four bonus tracks.

Ice-T stated on his autobiography that Seymour Stein took exception to the song "409" for the line "Guys grab a girl, girls grab a guy/If a guy wants a guy, please take it outside", which he saw as homophobic. Ice-T insisted that those lines were not meant to be homophobic, but simply a statement of his own preferences. An article by Dennis Hunt noted that this lyric "may rub gays the wrong way" in an interview on the album's release. Ice-T would later become one of the first hardcore rappers to condemn homophobia.

== Critical reception ==
Professional ratings
Review scores
| Source | Rating |
|---|---|
| AllMusic | 3.5/5 stars |
| The Rolling Stone Album Guide | 3/5 stars |
| The Village Voice | B |

In a contemporary review for The Village Voice, Robert Christgau gave Rhyme Pays a "B" and credited DJ Afrika Islam for helping flesh out Ice T's crime-themed raps: "Can't know whether his streetwise jabs at Reagan and recidivism will make a permanent impression on his core audience, but his sexploitations and true crime tales are detailed and harrowing enough to convince anybody he was there." According to AllMusic's Alex Henderson, "the West Coast was well on its way to becomining a crucial part of hip-hop" when Rhyme Pays was released. Los Angeles Times writer Dennis Hunt said the album helped popularize gangsta rap.

== Commercial performance ==
Rhyme Pays debuted at number 93 on the US Billboard 200 and number 26 on the Billboard Top R&B/Hip Hop Albums charts. It also became the first hip-hop album to be released on Sire and Warner Bros. Records. The album was eventually certified gold by the Recording Industry Association of America (RIAA) for sales of over 500,000 copies in the United States.

== Track listing ==
| No. | Title | Writer(s) | Length |
|---|---|---|---|
| 1. | "Intro/Rhyme Pays" (interpolates "Tubular Bells" and samples "War Pigs") | Ice-T; Dave Storrs | 6:30 |
| 2. | "6 'n the Mornin'" | Ice-T | 7:16 |
| 3. | "Make It Funky" (samples "Make It Funky") | Ice-T; James Brown; Charles Bobbitt; MC Shan | 5:10 |
| 4. | "Somebody Gotta Do It (Pimpin' Ain't Easy)" | Ice-T | 3:04 |
| 5. | "409" | Ice-T | 5:22 |
| 6. | "I Love Ladies" | Ice-T | 4:45 |
| 7. | "Sex" | Ice-T | 2:58 |
| 8. | "Pain" | Ice-T | 3:36 |
| 9. | "Squeeze the Trigger" | Ice-T | 6:14 |

CD bonus tracks
| No. | Title | Writer(s) | Length |
|---|---|---|---|
| 10. | "Make It Funky" (12" mix) | Ice-T | 5:57 |
| 11. | "Sex" ("bonus beat"; instrumental) | Ice-T | 3:52 |
| 12. | "Somebody Gotta Do It (Pimpin' Ain't Easy)" (12" mix) | Ice-T | 3:28 |
| 13. | "Our Most Requested Record" (long version; samples "Heartbreaker" and "Whole Lotta Love") | Ice-T | 6:43 |

== Charts ==
=== Weekly charts ===
| Chart (1987) | Peak position |
|---|---|
| US Billboard 200 | 93 |
| US Top R&B/Hip-Hop Albums (Billboard) | 26 |

== Certifications ==
| Region | Certification | Certified units/sales |
|---|---|---|
| United States (RIAA) | Gold | 500,000^{^} |
^{^} Shipments figures based on certification alone.
