= Colors (Ice-T song) =

Single by Ice-T

from the album Colors
- B-side: "Squeeze the Trigger"
- Released: 1988
- Recorded: 1987
- Genre: Gangsta rap
- Length: 4:25
- Songwriters: Ice-T; Afrika Islam

Ice-T singles chronology
"Somebody Gotta Do It" (1987)	"Colors" (1988)	"I'm Your Pusher" (1988)

"Colors" is a song by American rapper Ice-T, co-produced by Afrika Islam, featuring DJ Eric Garcia, or Evil E. It was issued as the title track for the soundtrack to the film of the same name. The song was released as a single in 1988. In 2008, it was named the 19th-greatest hip hop song of all time by VH1. The song was Ice-T's first to chart on the US Billboard Hot 100, where it peaked at number 70.The song samples "Ain't We Funkin' Now" by The Brothers Johnson.

Ice-T himself re-recorded the song with his band Body Count in 2020 for the album, Carnivore.

In 2021, gang scholar and sociology professor Stefano Bloch, aka "Cisco," called "Colors" "the greatest sociological text ever written on gang activity and identity".

== Charts ==
Chart (1988)	Peak position
U.S. Billboard Hot 100	70
U.S. Billboard Hot Black Singles	77

== Cover versions ==
- In 1996, the song was covered by Society Burning for the electro-industrial various artists compilation, Operation Beatbox.
- The song was covered by the groove metal band Machine Head and released on the 1997 bonus disc version of their album, The More Things Change...
- C-Murder made a remake called "Cluckers" (featuring Fiend) on his debut album, Life or Death, in 1998.
