= Gangsta Rap (album) =

Studio album by Ice-T
- Released: October 31, 2006
- Studio: Silent Sound Studios (Atlanta, GA); Henry Street Music (Brooklyn, New York)
- Genre: West Coast hip hop; gangsta rap
- Length: 75:39
- Label: Melee Entertainment
- Producer: LaVaba Mallison (co-exec.); Alonzo Williams; Ariel Caban; DJ Ace; Grand Daddy I.U.; Mad Rome; Marc Live; The Mayor From Presidential Beats

Ice-T chronology
Pimp to Eat (2000)	Gangsta Rap (2006)	Urban Legends (2008)

Singles from Gangsta Rap
- 1. "Walking in the Rain" Released: 2006

Professional ratings
Review scores
Source	Rating
AllMusic	2.5/5 stars
RapReviews	8.5/10 stars

Gangsta Rap is the eighth studio album by American rapper Ice-T. It was released on October 31, 2006 via Melee Entertainment.

== Background ==
Production was handled by several record producers, including Alonzo "Justice" Williams, Ariel Caban, DJ Ace, Grand Daddy I.U., Mad Rome, Marc Live, Mayor, and LaVaba Mallison as executive producer. It also features guest appearances from Smoothe da Hustler, DV Alias Kryst, Fedie Demarco, Marc Live, Trigga tha Gambler, Corte, and Coco. Before its release, shopping for a deal, several record companies wanted to censor the album cover, depicting Ice-T and his wife Nicole "Coco" Austin naked in bed.

== Track listing ==
No.	Title	Producer(s)	Length
1.	"Gangsta Rap"	Grand Daddy I.U.	3:49
2.	"Ridin' Low" (featuring Fedie Demarco)	Mad Rome	4:07
3.	"New Life"	Alonzo Williams	4:00
4.	"Dear God Can You Hear Me" (featuring D.V. Alias Khrist)	Alonzo Williams	3:51
5.	"Please Believe Me" (featuring Corte & Smoothe da Hustler)	Mayor For Presidential Beats	4:32
6.	"Pimp or Die" (featuring Marc Live)	Marc Live	3:57
7.	"Pray" (featuring Coco)	Ariel Caban	2:50
8.	"Step Your Game Up" (featuring Marc Live)	Ariel Caban; Marc Live	4:07
9.	"Real Talk" (featuring D.V. Alias Kryst)	DJ Ace	4:49
10.	"Walking in the Rain"	Mad Rome	4:36
11.	"The Game's Real" (featuring Trigger tha Gambler, Marc Live & Smoothe da Hustler)	Marc Live	4:32
12.	"It's All Love" (featuring D.V. Alias Kryst)	Alonzo Williams	4:14
13.	"Code of the Streets"	Alonzo Williams	4:48
14.	"Everything Is Going to be Alright" (featuring Smoothe da Hustler)	Mad Rome	4:18
15.	"My Baby"	Alonzo Williams	3:57
16.	"Twice the Game"	DJ Ace	4:24
17.	"It's the Gangsta Sound" (featuring C.O.C. & Fedie DeMarco)		4:26
18.	"West Coast G Ship" (featuring Fedie DeMarco)		4:22
Total length:			66:50

== Personnel ==
- Tracy Lauren Marrow – main artist, model
- Kenneth Scranton – featured artist (tracks: 4, 9, 12)
- Damon Smith – featured artist (tracks: 5, 11, 14)
- Marc Giveand – featured artist & producer (tracks: 6, 8, 11)
- Feddi De Marco – featured artist (tracks: 2, 17, 18)
- Tawan Smith – featured artist (track 11)
- Nicole Natalie Marrow Austin – featured artist (track 7), model
- Corte – featured artist (track 5)
- Alonzo "Justice" Williams – producer (tracks: 3, 4, 12, 13, 15)
- Romy Geroso Jr. – producer (tracks: 2, 10, 14)
- Ariel "The Cartel" Caban – producer (tracks: 7, 8)
- Richard Ascencio – producer (tracks: 9, 16)
- Grand Daddy I.U. – producer (track 1)
- The Mayor from Presidential Beats – producer (track 5)
- LaVaba Mallison – executive producer
- Hernan Santiago – engineering
- Taurez – engineering
- Tony Dawsey – mastering
- Steve Vaccariello – photography
- Jorge Hinojosa – management
- Mike Regen – marketing
