= Ice-T =

American rapper and actor (born 1958)

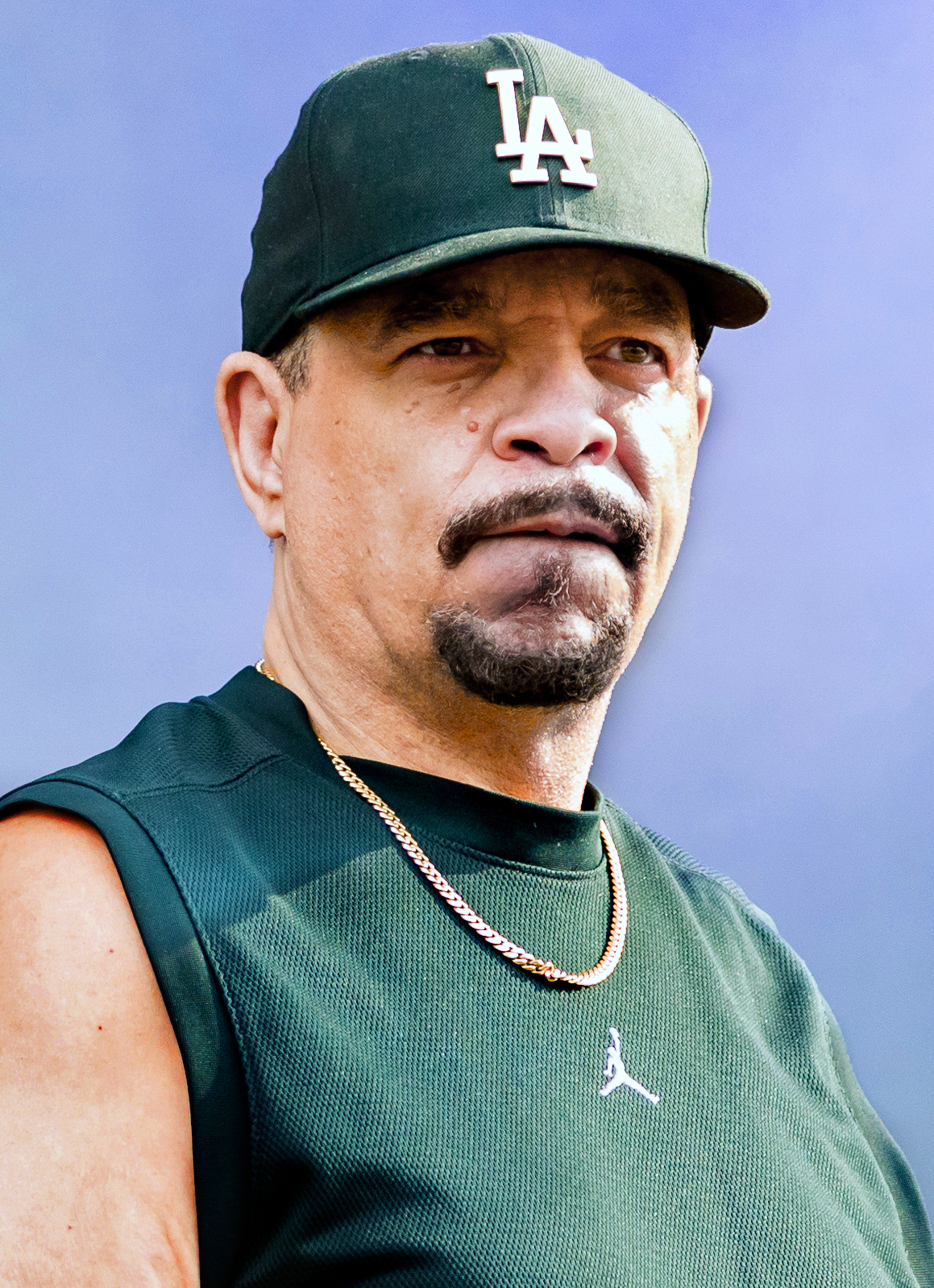
- Ice-T performing with Body Count in 2019
- Born: Tracy Lauren Marrow; February 16, 1958 (age 68); Newark, New Jersey, U.S.
- Occupations: Rapper; actor; songwriter; producer; author
- Years active: 1982–present
- Works: Discography
- Spouse: Coco Austin (m. 2002)
- Partner: Darlene Ortiz (1984–2001)
- Children: 3
- Musical career
- Origin: Los Angeles, California, U.S.
- Genres: West Coast hip-hop; gangsta rap; political rap; heavy metal; rap metal
- Instrument: Vocals
- Labels: Saturn; Sire; Warner Bros.; Priority; Rhyme Syndicate; Sumerian; Century Media
- Member of: Body Count
- Formerly of: Uncle Jamm's Army
- Website: icet.com

Tracy Lauren Marrow (born February 16, 1958), known professionally as Ice-T (or Ice T), is an American rapper and actor. He is active in both hip-hop and heavy metal. Ice-T began his career as an underground rapper in the 1980s and was signed to Sire Records in 1987, when he released his debut album Rhyme Pays. The following year, he founded the record label Rhyme $yndicate Records (named after his collective of fellow hip-hop artists called the "Rhyme $yndicate") and released another album, Power (1988), which is Ice-T's only album to be certified platinum by the RIAA. His next three albums, The Iceberg/Freedom of Speech... Just Watch What You Say! (1989), O.G. Original Gangster (1991) and Home Invasion (1993), were also critically acclaimed and commercially successful, and were all certified gold in the US.

Ice-T co-founded the heavy metal band Body Count in 1990, which he introduced on O.G. Original Gangster, on the track titled "Body Count". The band released its self-titled debut album in 1992. Ice-T encountered controversy over his track "Cop Killer", the lyrics of which discussed killing police officers. He asked to be released from his contract with Warner Bros. Records, and his follow-up solo album, Home Invasion, was released through Priority Records. Ice-T released two more albums in the late 1990s and one in the 2000s before focusing on both his acting career and Body Count, who have released eight studio albums to date, the latest being 2024's Merciless.

As an actor, Ice-T played small parts in the films Breakin' (1984) and its sequels, Breakin' 2: Electric Boogaloo and Rappin' (1984 and 1985 respectively), before his major role debut, starring as police detective Scotty Appleton in New Jack City (1991). He received top billing for his role in Surviving the Game (1994) and continued to appear in small roles in TV series and other films throughout the 1990s. Since 2000, he has portrayed NYPD detective/sergeant Odafin Tutuola on the NBC police drama Law & Order: Special Victims Unit, making him the longest-running male series actor in American TV history, according to Deadline. A reality television show titled Ice Loves Coco ran for three seasons (2011–2013) on E!, featuring the home life of Ice-T and his wife Coco Austin. In 2018, he began hosting the true crime documentary In Ice Cold Blood on the Oxygen cable channel, which ran for three seasons.

== Early life ==
Tracy Lauren Marrow, the son of Solomon and Alice Marrow, was born in Newark, New Jersey on February 16, 1958. Solomon's family was originally from Virginia and Philadelphia, and Alice's family was originally from Louisiana. Both of his parents were African American. Ice-T states that his father was a "dark-skinned brother" while his mother was a "fair-skinned" black woman who looked like Dorothy Dandridge or Lena Horne. For decades, Solomon worked as a conveyor belt mechanic at the Rapistan Conveyor Company. When Marrow was a child, his family moved to upscale Summit, New Jersey. The first time race played a major part in Marrow's life was at the age of seven, when he became aware of the racism leveled by his white friends towards black children. Marrow surmised that he escaped similar treatment because they thought that he was white due to his lighter skin. Relaying this incident to his mother, she told him, "Honey, people are stupid"; her advice and this incident taught Marrow to control the way the negativity of others affected him.

His mother died of a heart attack when he was in third grade. Solomon raised Marrow as a single father for four years, with help from a housekeeper. Marrow's first experience with illicit activity occurred after a bicycle that his father bought him for Christmas was stolen. After Marrow told his father, Solomon shrugged, "Well, then, you ain't got no bike". Marrow stole parts from bicycles and assembled "three or four weird-looking, brightly-painted bikes" from the parts; his father either did not notice or never acknowledged this. When Marrow was 13 years old, Solomon also died of a heart attack.

Following his father's death, the orphaned Marrow briefly lived with a nearby aunt, then was sent to live with his other aunt and her husband in View Park-Windsor Hills, an upper middle-class Black neighborhood in South Los Angeles. While his cousin Earl was preparing to leave for college, Marrow shared a bedroom with him. Earl was a fan of rock music and listened only to the local rock radio stations; sharing a room with him sparked Marrow's interest in heavy metal music.

External videos
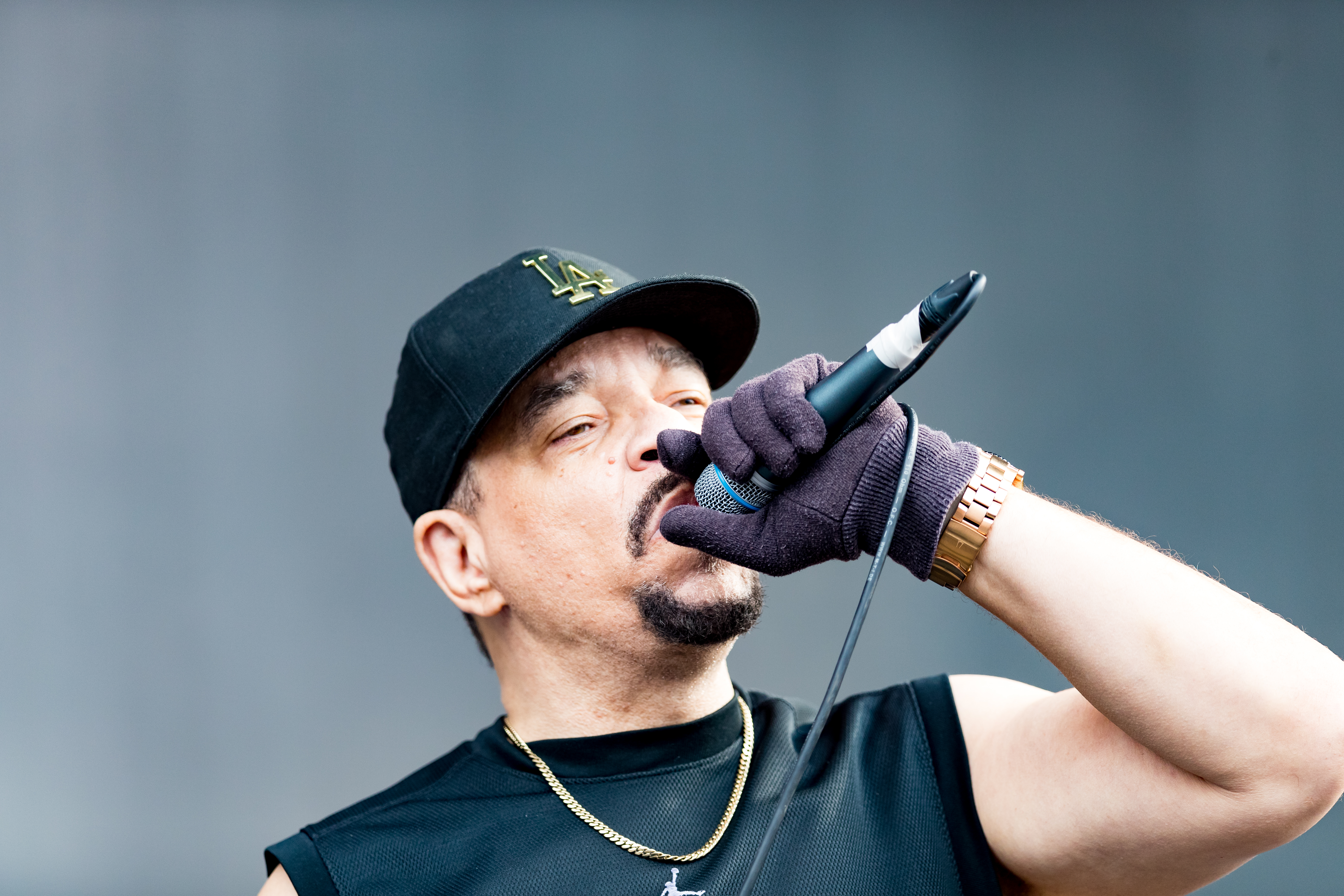
- Ice-T - Wikipedia: Fact or Fiction? (Part 1), Loudwire
- Ice-T - Wikipedia: Fact or Fiction? (Part 2), Loudwire

=== High school, early criminal activity, military service ===
Marrow moved to the Crenshaw District of Los Angeles when he was in the eighth grade. He attended Palms Junior High, which was predominantly made up of white students, and included black students who traveled by bus from South Central to attend. He then attended Crenshaw High School, which was almost entirely made up of black students.

Marrow stood out from most of his friends because he did not drink alcohol, smoke tobacco, or use drugs. During Marrow's time in high school, gangs became more prevalent in the Los Angeles school system. Students who belonged to the Crips and Bloods gangs attended Crenshaw, and fought in the school's hallways. Marrow, while never an actual gang member, was affiliated with the former. Marrow began reading the novels of Iceberg Slim, which he memorized and recited to his friends, who enjoyed hearing the excerpts and told him, "Yo, kick some more of that by Ice, T", giving Marrow his nickname. Marrow and other Crips wrote and performed "Crip Rhymes".

His music career started with the band of the singing group The Precious Few of Crenshaw High School. Marrow and his group opened the show, dancing to a live band. The singers were Thomas Barnes, Ronald Robinson and Lapekas Mayfield.

In 1975, at the age of seventeen, Marrow began receiving Social Security benefits resulting from the death of his father and used the money to rent an apartment for $90 a month. He sold cannabis and stole car stereos to earn extra cash, but he was not making enough to support his pregnant girlfriend. After his daughter was born, Marrow enlisted in the United States Army in October 1977. Following basic training, Marrow was assigned to the 25th Infantry Division. During his time in the army Marrow was involved with a group of soldiers charged with the theft of a rug. While awaiting trial, he received a $2,500 bonus check and went absent without leave (AWOL), returning a month later, after the rug had been returned. Marrow received a non-judicial punishment as a consequence of his dereliction of duty.

During his spell in the Army, Marrow became interested in hip-hop. He heard The Sugarhill Gang's newly released single "Rapper's Delight" (1979), which inspired him to perform his own raps over the instrumentals of this and other early hip-hop records. The music, however, did not fit his lyrics or form of delivery.

When he was stationed in Hawaii (where prostitution was not a heavily prosecuted crime) as a squad leader at Schofield Barracks, Marrow met a pimp named Mac. Mac admired that Marrow could quote Iceberg Slim, and he taught Marrow how to be a pimp himself. Marrow was also able to purchase stereo equipment cheaply in Hawaii, including two Technics turntables, a mixer, and large speakers. Once equipped, he then began to learn turntablism and rapping.

Marrow learned from his commanding officer that he could receive an early honorable discharge because he was a single father. Taking advantage of this, Marrow was discharged as a Private First Class (PFC - E3) in December 1979 after serving for two years and two months.

During an episode of The Adam Carolla Podcast that aired on June 6, 2012, Marrow claimed that after being discharged from the Army, he began a career as a bank robber. Marrow claimed he and some associates began conducting take-over bank robberies "like [in the film] Heat". Marrow then elaborated, explaining, "Only punks go for the drawer, we gotta go for the safe." Marrow also stated he was glad the United States justice system has statutes of limitations, which had likely expired when Marrow admitted to his involvement in multiple Class 1 Felonies in the early-to-mid 1980s.

In July 2010, Marrow was mistakenly arrested. A month later when Marrow attended court, the charges were dropped and the prosecution stated "there had been a clerical error when the rapper was arrested". Marrow gave some advice to young people who think going to jail is a mark of integrity, saying, "Street credibility has nothing to do with going to jail, it has everything to do with staying out."

== Career ==
=== Music ===
==== Early career (1980–1981) ====
After leaving the Army, Marrow wanted to stay away from gang life and violence and instead make a name for himself as a DJ. As a tribute to Iceberg Slim, Marrow adopted the stage name Ice-T. While performing as a DJ at parties, he received more attention for his rapping, which led Ice-T to pursue a career as a rapper. However, he soon returned to a life of crime and robbed jewelry stores with his high school friends. Ice-T's raps later described how he and his friends pretended to be customers to gain access before smashing the display glass with small sledgehammers.

Ice-T's friends Al P. and Sean E. Sean went to prison. Al P. was caught in 1982 and sent to prison for robbing a high-end jewelry store in Laguna Niguel for $2.5 million in jewelry. Sean was arrested for possession of not only cannabis, which Sean sold, but also material stolen by Ice-T. Sean took the blame and served two years in prison. Ice-T stated that he owed a debt of gratitude to Sean because his prison time allowed him to pursue a career as a rapper. Concurrently, he wound up in a car accident and was hospitalized as a John Doe because he did not carry any form of identification due to his criminal activities. After being discharged from the hospital, he decided to abandon the criminal lifestyle and pursue a professional career rapping. Two weeks after being released from the hospital, he won an open mic competition judged by Kurtis Blow at the Carolina West nightclub. According to Michael Khalfani (known as Disco Daddy), Ice-T won the first week of the competition under the name of DJ Tracy, but got beaten by Disco Daddy the second week, which led to the name change of Ice-T (Khalfani got signed to Rappers Rapp Records).

==== Professional career (1982–2021) ====
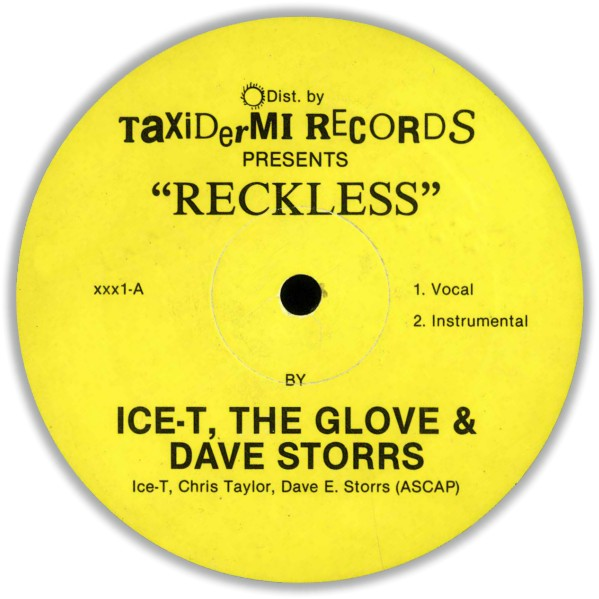
Ice-T released a string of Electro records, including the 1984 single "Reckless" (pictured), before recording gangsta rap music.

In 1982, Ice-T met producer Willie Strong from Saturn Records. In 1983, Strong recorded Ice-T's first single, "Cold Wind Madness", also known as "The Coldest Rap", an electro hip-hop record that became an underground success, becoming popular even though radio stations did not play it due to the song's explicit lyrics about taking a woman to the Snooty Fox motel in Los Angeles. That same year, Ice-T meets Alex Jordanov to set up one of the first hip-hop clubs in Los Angeles, The Radio, where he also meets DJ Chris "The Glove" Taylor. He released "Body Rock", another electro hip-hop single that found popularity in clubs. In 1984, Ice-T was a featured rapper on "Reckless", a single by DJ Chris "The Glove" Taylor and (co-producer) David Storrs that gained widespread popularity as a featured track via the motion picture Breakin' and its soundtrack album. This song was almost immediately followed up with a sequel entitled "Reckless Rivalry (Combat)", which was featured in the Breakin' sequel, Breakin' 2: Electric Boogaloo, however, it was never featured on the soundtrack album and was only released as a single on Taxidermi Records. In 1985, he appeared in the film Rappin' by performing two verses of his track "Killers", which was his first political rap. Ice later recorded the songs "Ya Don't Quit" and "Dog'n the Wax (Ya Don't Quit-Part II)" with Unknown DJ, who provided a Run-DMC–like sound for the songs.

Ice-T received further inspiration as an artist from Schoolly D's gangsta rap single "P.S.K. What Does It Mean?", which he heard in a club. Ice-T enjoyed the single's sound and delivery, as well as its vague references to gang life, although the real life gang, Park Side Killers, was not named in the song.

Ice-T decided to adopt Schoolly D's style, and wrote the lyrics to his first gangsta rap song, "6 in the Mornin'", in his Hollywood apartment, and created a minimal beat with a Roland TR-808. He compared the sound of the song, which was recorded as a B-side on the single "Dog'n The Wax", to that of the Beastie Boys. The A-side caused some controversy for the lyrics, which were unusually violent by the standards of hip-hop at the time. The B-side was more successful and was later released as an extended rap on his first album. He intentionally did not represent any particular gang, and wore a mixture of red and blue clothing and shoes to avoid antagonizing gang-affiliated listeners, who debated his true affiliation.

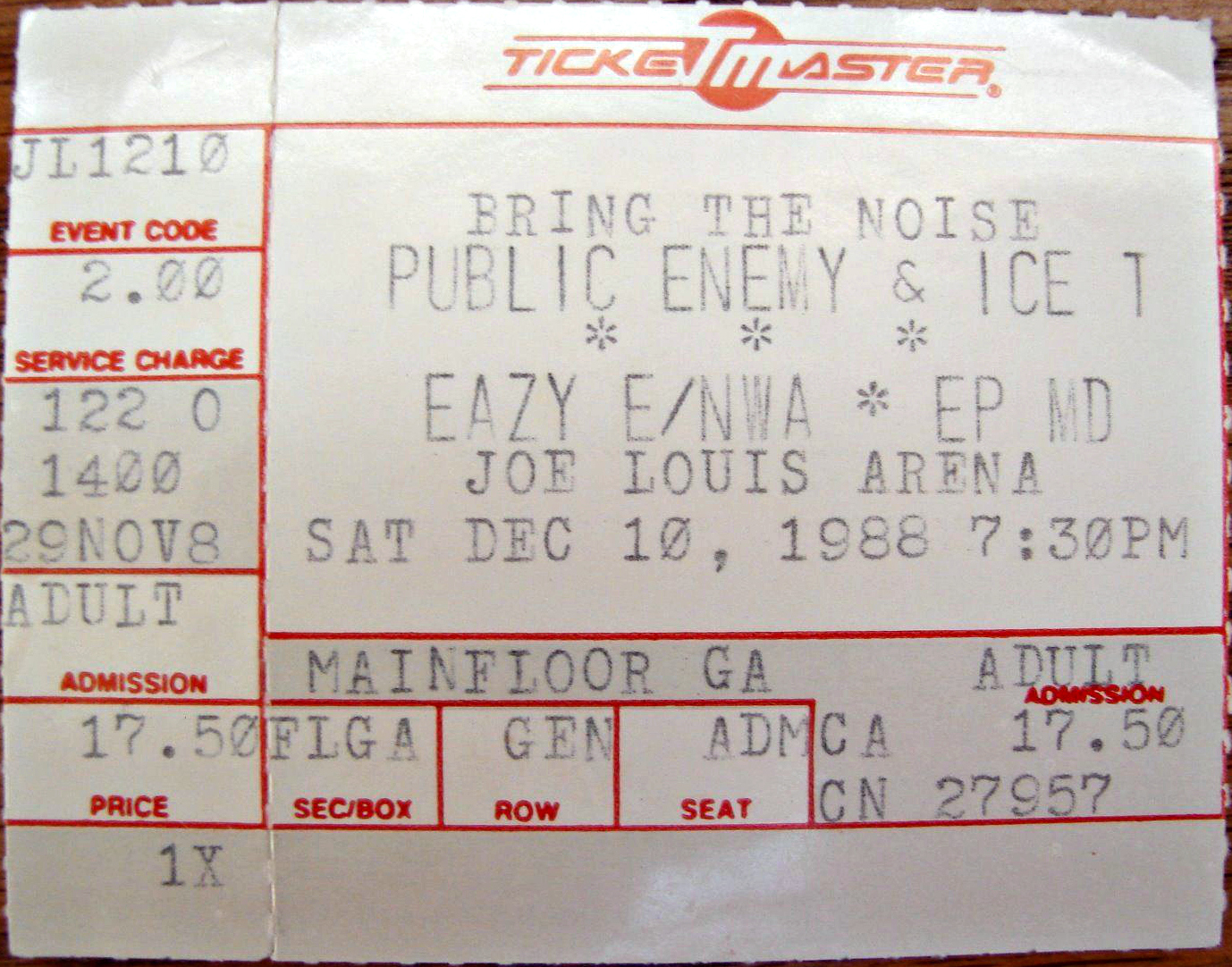
In support of Power, Ice-T co-headlined Public Enemy's 1988 "Bring the Noise" concert tour, which was supported by then up-and-coming acts Eazy-E and EPMD.

Ice-T finally landed a deal with a major label Sire Records. When label founder and president Seymour Stein heard his demo, he said Ice-T sounded like Bob Dylan. Shortly after, he released his debut album Rhyme Pays in 1987 supported by DJ Evil E, DJ Aladdin and producer Afrika Islam, who helped create the mainly party-oriented sound. The record wound up being certified gold by the Recording Industry Association of America. That same year, he recorded the title theme song for Dennis Hopper's Colors, a film about inner-city gang life in Los Angeles. His next album Power was released in 1988, under his own label Rhyme Syndicate, and it was a more assured and impressive record, earning him strong reviews and his second gold record. Released in 1989, The Iceberg/Freedom of Speech... Just Watch What You Say! established his popularity by matching excellent abrasive music with narrative and commentative lyrics. In the same year, he appeared on Hugh Harris' single "Alice".

In 1991, he released his album O.G. Original Gangster. On OG, he introduced his heavy metal band Body Count in a track of the same name. Ice-T toured with Body Count on the first annual Lollapalooza concert tour in 1991, gaining him appeal among middle-class teenagers and fans of alternative music genres. The album Body Count was released in March 1992. For his appearance on the heavily collaborative track "Back on the Block", a composition by jazz musician Quincy Jones that "attempt[ed] to bring together black musical styles from jazz to soul to funk to rap", Ice-T won a Grammy Award for the Best Rap Performance by a Duo or Group, an award shared by others who worked on the track including Jones and fellow jazz musician Ray Charles.

Controversy later surrounded Body Count over its song "Cop Killer". The rock song was intended to speak from the viewpoint of a criminal getting revenge on racist, brutal cops. Ice-T's rock song infuriated government officials, the National Rifle Association of America, and various police advocacy groups. Consequently, Time Warner Music refused to release Ice-T's upcoming album Home Invasion because of the controversy surrounding "Cop Killer". Ice-T suggested that the furor over the song was an overreaction, telling journalist Chuck Philips "...they've done movies about nurse killers and teacher killers and student killers. Arnold Schwarzenegger blew away dozens of cops as the Terminator. But I don't hear anybody complaining about that". In the same interview, Ice-T suggested to Philips that the misunderstanding of Cop Killer, the misclassification of it as a rap song (not a rock song), and the attempts to censor it had racial overtones: "The Supreme Court says it's OK for a white man to burn a cross in public. But nobody wants a black man to write a record about a cop killer".

Ice-T split amicably with Sire/Warner Bros. Records after a dispute over the artwork of the album Home Invasion. He then reactivated Rhyme Syndicate and formed a deal with Priority Records for distribution. Priority released Home Invasion in the spring of 1993. The album peaked at No. 9 on Billboard magazine's Top R&B/Hip-Hop Albums and at No. 14 on the Billboard 200, spawning several singles including "Gotta Lotta Love", "I Ain't New Ta This" and "99 Problems" – which would later inspire Jay-Z to record a version with new lyrics in 2003. In 2003 he released the single "Beat of Life" with Sandra Nasić, Trigga tha Gambler and DJ Tomekk and placed in the German charts.

Ice-T had also collaborated with certain other heavy metal bands during this time period. For the film Judgment Night, he did a duet with Slayer on the track "Disorder". In 1995, Ice-T made a guest performance on Forbidden by Black Sabbath. Another album of his, VI – Return of the Real, was released in 1996, followed by The Seventh Deadly Sin in 1999.

His first rap album since 1999, Gangsta Rap, was released on October 31, 2006. The album's cover, which "shows [Ice-T] lying on his back in bed with his ravishing wife's ample posterior in full view and one of her legs coyly draped over his private parts", was considered to be too suggestive for most retailers, many of which were reluctant to stock the album. Some reviews of the album were unenthusiastic, as many had hoped for a return to the political raps of Ice-T's most successful albums.

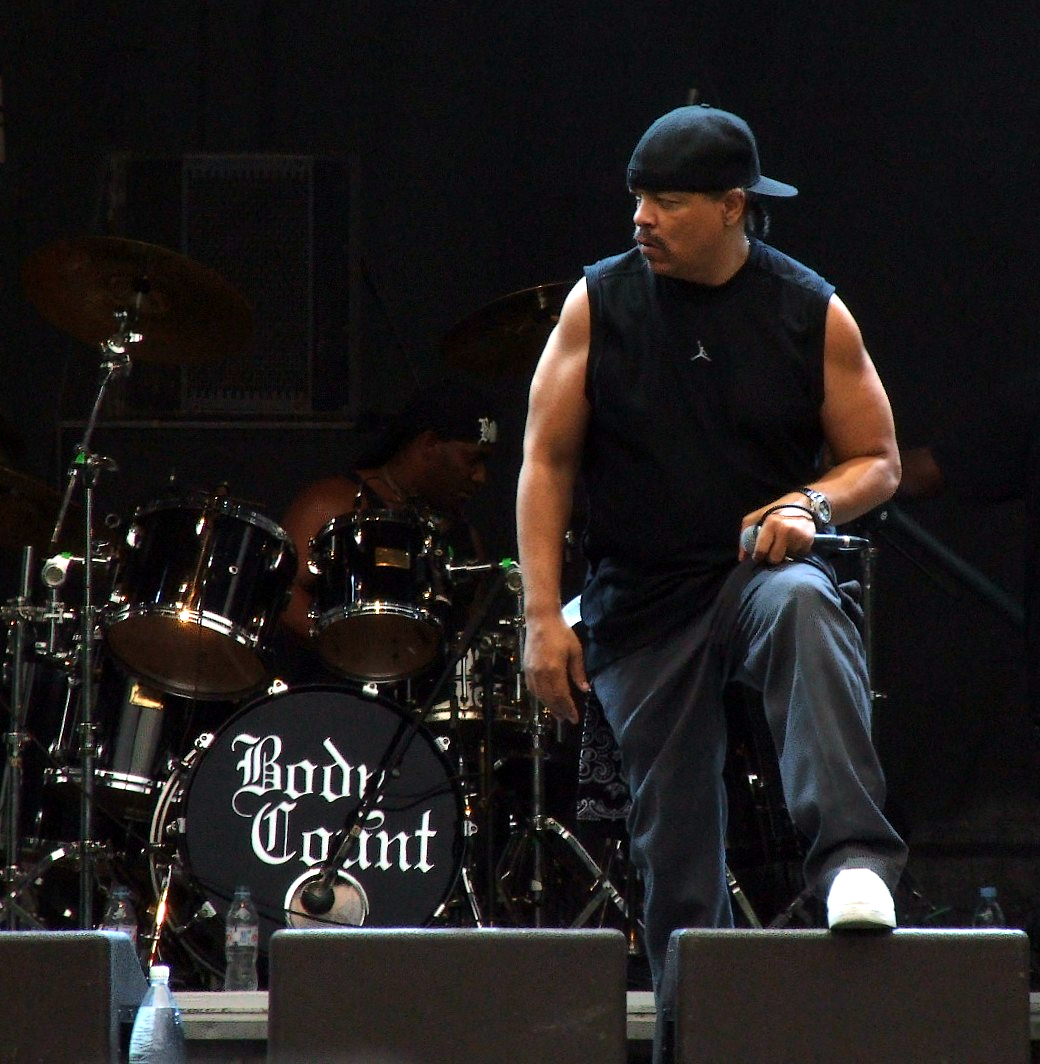
Ice-T performing with Body Count in 2006

Ice-T appears in the film Gift. One of the last scenes includes Ice-T and Body Count playing with Jane's Addiction in a version of the Sly and the Family Stone song "Don't Call Me Nigger, Whitey".

Besides fronting his own band and rap projects, Ice-T has also collaborated with other hard rock and metal bands, such as Icepick, Motörhead, Megadeth, Pro-Pain, and Six Feet Under. He has also covered songs by hardcore punk bands such as the Exploited, Jello Biafra, and Black Flag. Ice-T made an appearance at Insane Clown Posse's Gathering of the Juggalos (2008 edition). Ice-T was also a judge for the 7th annual Independent Music Awards to support independent artists. His 2012 film Something from Nothing: The Art of Rap features a who's who of underground and mainstream rappers.

In November 2011, Ice-T announced via Twitter that he was in the process of collecting beats for his next LP which was expected sometime during 2012, but as of October 2014, the album has not been released. A new Body Count album, Bloodlust, was released in 2017. After the release of the album, responding to an interview question asking if he's "done with rap", he answered "I don't know" and noted that he's "really leaning more toward EDM right now". Body Count received their second Grammy nomination and later won the award at the 63rd Annual Grammy Awards in 2021 for "Best Metal Performance" with their song "Bum-Rush" from the album Carnivore.

In July 2019, Ice-T released his first solo hip-hop track in 10 years, titled "Feds in My Rearview". The track is the first in a trilogy, with the second track, "Too Old for the Dumb Shit", described as a prequel to "Feds in My Rearview", and released in September 2019. Ice-T was also featured on the 2020 hip-hop posse cut "The Slayers Club" alongside R.A. the Rugged Man, Brand Nubian and others.

Ice-T performed at New Year's Eve Toast & Roast 2021, Fox broadcast.

==== New album: Criminal Migraine (2026–present) ====
On August 17, 2026, Ice-T released a new double album, Criminal Migraine, for digital download independently through his website. This is Ice's first new rap album in 20 years, since Gangsta Rap was released in 2006. The new album is not available on any streaming service and features guest appearances by Treach, Smoothe Da Hustler, CJ Mac and Ras Kass.

=== Acting ===
==== Television and film ====
Ice-T was prominently featured as both a rapper and a breakdancer in Breakin' 'n' Enterin' (1983), a documentary about the early West Coast hip-hop scene.

Ice-T's first film appearances were in the motion pictures, Breakin' (1984), and its sequel, Breakin' 2: Electric Boogaloo (1984). These films were released before Ice-T released his first LP, although he appears on the soundtrack to Breakin'. He has since stated he considers the films and his own performance in them to be "wack".

In 1991, he embarked on a serious acting career, portraying police detective Scotty Appleton in Mario Van Peebles' action thriller New Jack City, gang leader Odessa (alongside Denzel Washington and John Lithgow) in Ricochet (1991), gang leader King James in Trespass (1992), followed by a notable lead role performance in Surviving the Game (1994), in addition to many supporting roles, such as J-Bone in Johnny Mnemonic (1995), and the marsupial mutant T-Saint in Tank Girl (1995). He was also interviewed in the Brent Owens documentary Pimps Up, Ho's Down, in which he claims to have had an extensive pimping background before getting into rap. He is quoted as saying "once you max something out, it ain't no fun no more. I couldn't really get no farther." He goes on to explain his pimping experience gave him the ability to get into new businesses. "I can't act, I really can't act, I ain't no rapper, it's all game. I'm just working these niggas." Later he raps at the Players Ball.

In 1993, Ice-T, along with other rappers and the three Yo! MTV Raps hosts Ed Lover, Doctor Dré, and Fab 5 Freddy starred in the comedy Who's the Man?, directed by Ted Demme. In the film, he is a drug dealer who gets really frustrated when someone calls him by his real name, "Chauncey", rather than his street name, "Nighttrain".

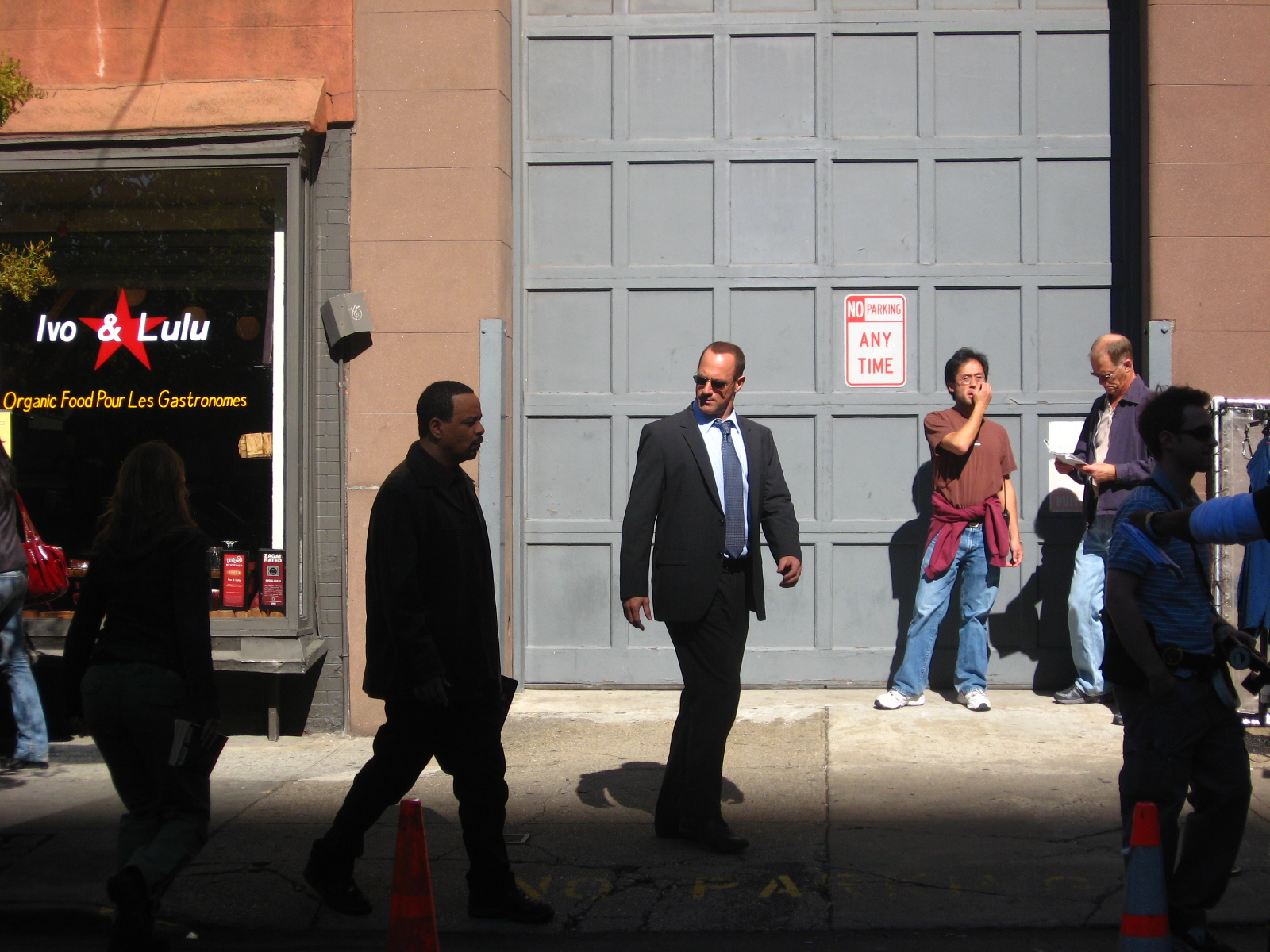
Ice-T with Christopher Meloni shooting Law & Order: SVU on Broome Street in SoHo, New York City, 2008

In 1995, Ice-T had a recurring role as vengeful drug dealer Danny Cort on the television series New York Undercover, co-created by Dick Wolf. His work on the series earned him the 1996 NAACP Image Award for Outstanding Supporting Actor in a Drama Series. In 1997, he co-created the short-lived series Players, produced by Wolf. This was followed by a role as pimp Seymour "Kingston" Stockton in Exiled: A Law & Order Movie (1998). These collaborations led Wolf to add Ice-T to the cast of Law & Order: Special Victims Unit. Since 2000, he has portrayed Odafin "Fin" Tutuola, a former undercover narcotics officer transferred to the Special Victims Unit. In 2002, the NAACP awarded Ice-T with a second Image Award, again for Outstanding Supporting Actor in a Drama Series, for his work on Law & Order: SVU.

Around 1995, Ice-T co-presented a UK-produced magazine television series on black culture, Baadasss TV.

In 1997, Ice-T had a pay-per-view special titled Ice-T's Extreme Babes which appeared on Action PPV, formerly owned by BET Networks.

In 1999, Ice-T starred in the HBO film Stealth Fighter as a United States Naval Aviator who fakes his own death, steals an F-117 stealth fighter, and threatens to destroy United States military bases. He also acted in the film Sonic Impact, released the same year.

Ice-T made an appearance on the comedy television series Chappelle's Show as himself presenting the award for "Player Hater of the Year" at the "Player-Haters Ball", a parody of his own appearance at the Players Ball. He was dubbed the "Original Player Hater".

Beyond Tough, a 2002 documentary series, aired on Discovery Channel about the world's most dangerous and intense professions, such as alligator wrestlers and Indy 500 pit crews, was hosted by Ice-T.

In 2007, Ice-T appeared as a celebrity guest star on the MTV sketch comedy show Short Circuitz. Also in late 2007, he appeared in the short-music film Hands of Hatred, which can be found online.

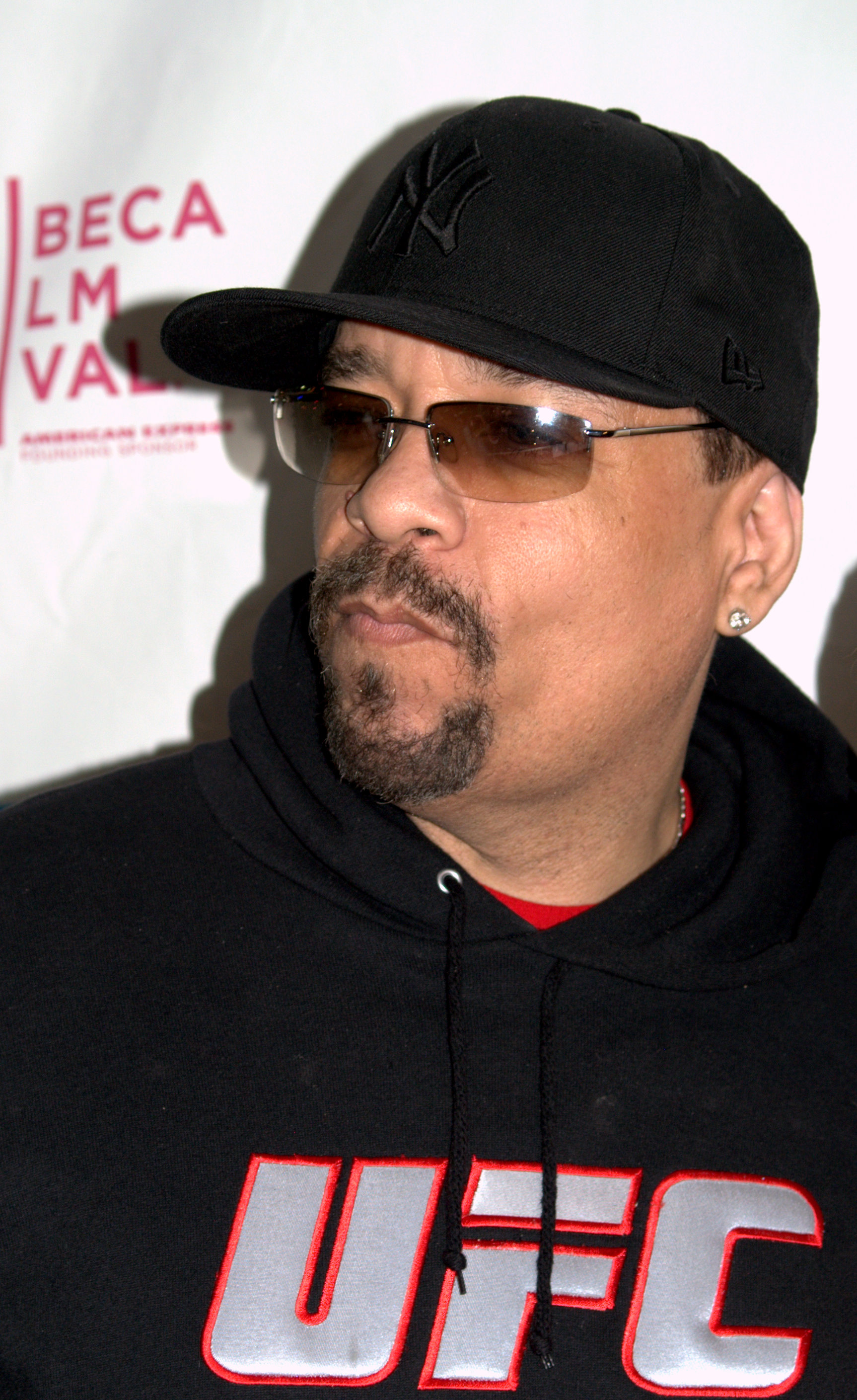
Ice-T at the 2009 Tribeca Film Festival for the premiere of Burning Down the House

Ice-T was interviewed for the Cannibal Corpse retrospective documentary Centuries of Torment, as well as appearing in Chris Rock's 2009 documentary Good Hair, in which he reminisced about going to school in hair curlers.

A 2016 advertisement for GEICO features Ice-T behind a lemonade stand run by children. When people ask if it is Ice-T, the actor yells back, "No, it's lemonade!"

In 2020, Ice-T competed on The Masked Singer spin-off The Masked Dancer where he portrayed "Disco Ball" and was the first to be eliminated.

==== Voice acting ====
Ice-T's voice acting roles include Madd Dogg in the video game Grand Theft Auto: San Andreas, as well as Agent Cain in Sanity: Aiken's Artifact. He also appears as himself in Def Jam: Fight for NY and UFC: Tapout fighting video games. He also voiced the character Aaron Griffin in the video game Gears of War 3. Marrow also made an appearance in the 2019 video game Borderlands 3, in which he voices the character of BALEX. On August 22, 2023, it was revealed at Gamescom 2023 that he would be voicing the contractor, Mac in Payday 3.

=== Other ventures ===
==== Podcasting ====
In 2013, Ice-T began co-hosting the Ice-T: Final Level podcast with his longtime friend, Mick Benzo (known as Zulu Beatz on Sirius XM). The duo interviewed many guests from the early days of hip-hop. The last episode was released in 2017.

==== Reality television ====
On October 20, 2006, Ice-T's Rap School aired and was a reality television show on VH1. It was a spin-off of the British reality show Gene Simmons' Rock School, which also aired on VH1. In Rap School, rapper/actor Ice-T teaches eight teens from York Preparatory School in New York called the "York Prep Crew" ("Y.P. Crew" for short). Each week, Ice-T gives them assignments and they compete for an imitation gold chain with a microphone on it. On the season finale on November 17, 2006, the group performed as an opening act for Public Enemy.

On June 12, 2011, E! reality show Ice Loves Coco debuted. The show is mostly about his relationship with his wife, Nicole "Coco" Austin.

== In popular media ==
- In the Rick and Morty episode "Get Schwifty", the character "Ice-T", voiced by show creator Dan Harmon, is portrayed as secretly being alien royalty exiled to Earth, whose natural shape is a letter T made of water. Ice-T reacted on Twitter by saying "This happens with cartoonists after lots of drugs…. Fn Crazy!!". Despite this, he would later voice the character Magma-Q, the fictional father of Ice-T, in the season 7 Rick and Morty episode "Rise of the Numbericons".
- Stand-up comedian John Mulaney dedicates a long segment on his comedy special New in Town to the humorous expositional nature of Ice-T's role on Special Victims Unit, saying that his function on the show is to be perpetually amazed by bad things, despite being in a sex crimes unit.

== Style and influence ==
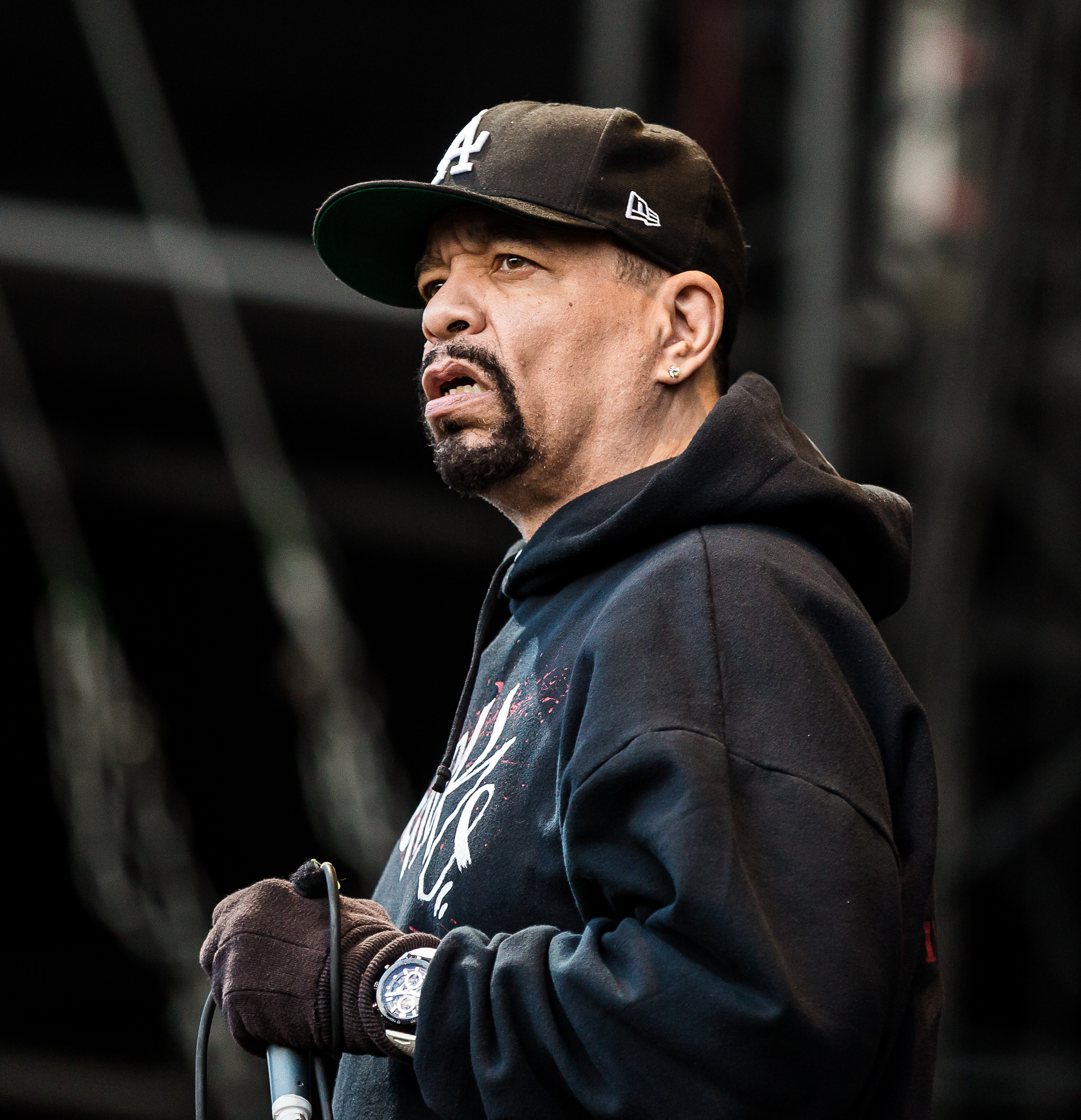
Ice-T at With Full Force 2018

Ice-T cites writer Iceberg Slim and rapper Schoolly D as influences, with Iceberg Slim's novels guiding his skills as a lyricist. His favorite heavy rock acts are Edgar Winter, Led Zeppelin and Black Sabbath. His hip-hop albums helped shape gangsta rap, with music journalists tracing works of artists such as Tupac Shakur, Notorious B.I.G., Eminem and N.W.A to "6 in the Mornin'".

A love of rock led Ice to use guitar in his albums, to provide his songs with edge and power, and to make his raps harder. He drew on the fusion of rock and hip-hop by Rick Rubin-produced acts such as Beastie Boys, Run-DMC, and LL Cool J, who featured rock samples in their songs.

Body Count – whose 1992 debut album Ice described as a "rock album with a rap mentality" – is described as paving the way for the success of rap rock fusions by acts like Kid Rock and Limp Bizkit. However, Ice-T states that the band's style does not fuse the two genres, and that Body Count is solely a rock band.

In Hip Hop Connection, Ice listed his favorite rap albums:

10. Beastie Boys, Licensed to Ill
9. Eric B. & Rakim, Paid in Full
8. N.W.A, Straight Outta Compton
7. Wu-Tang Clan, Enter the Wu-Tang (36 Chambers)
6. The Notorious B.I.G., Ready to Die
5. Dr. Dre, The Chronic
4. Boogie Down Productions, Criminal Minded
3. Ultramagnetic MCs, Critical Beatdown
2. Public Enemy, It Takes a Nation of Millions to Hold Us Back
1. Run-DMC, Run-DMC

== Personal life ==
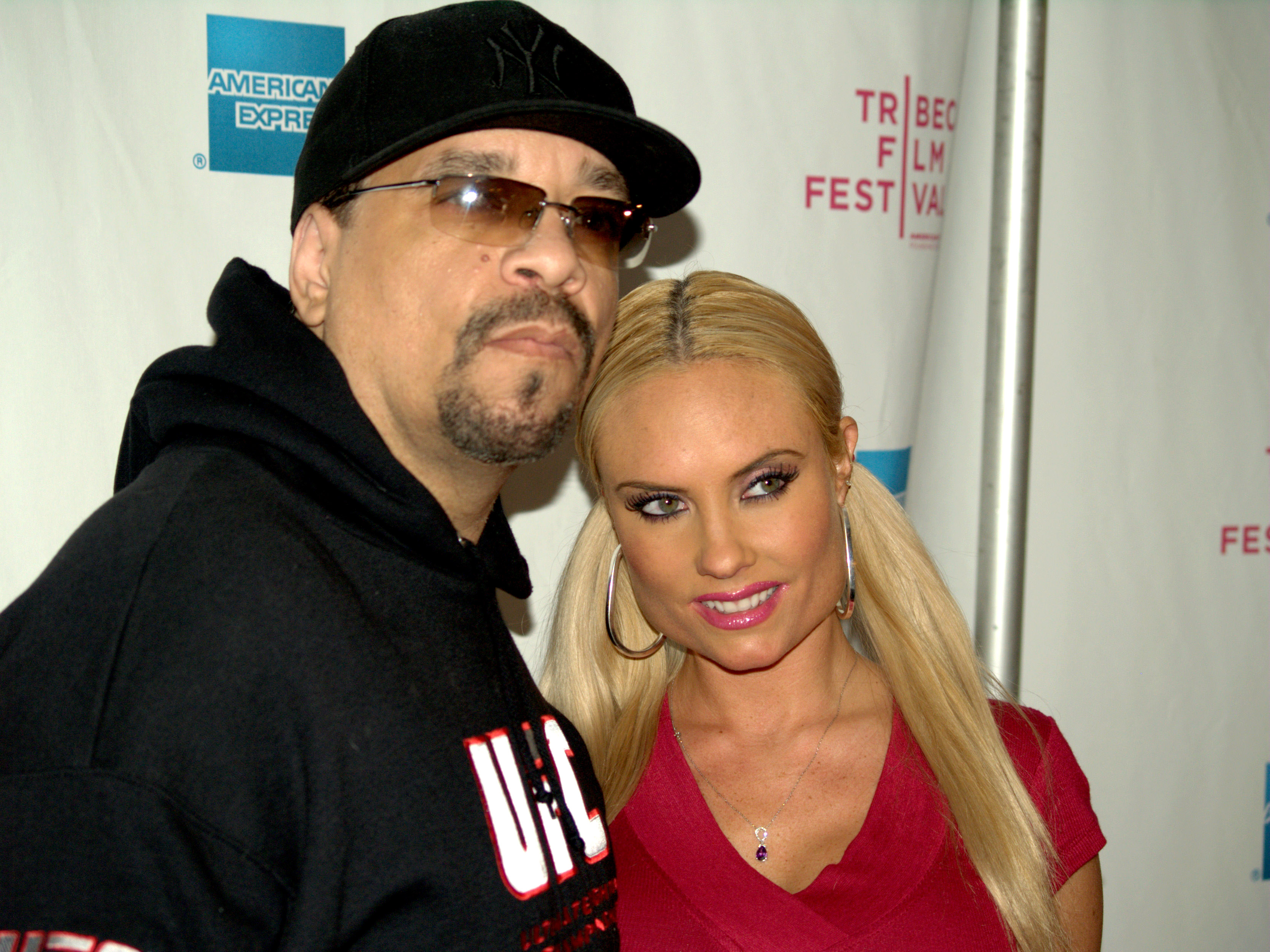
Ice-T with his wife Coco Austin

On March 20, 1976, Marrow's high school girlfriend Adrienne gave birth to their daughter LeTesha Marrow, and they continued attending high school while raising her. While filming Breakin' in 1984, he met his second girlfriend Darlene Ortiz, who was at the club where the film was shot. They began a relationship and Ortiz was featured on the covers of Rhyme Pays and Power. Ice-T and Ortiz had a son, Ice Tracy Marrow Jr., on November 23, 1991; Ice Marrow, aka "Little Ice", became a backing vocalist with Body Count in time for the recording of their album Carnivore.

Ice-T married swimsuit model Coco Austin in January 2002. In celebration of their impending ninth wedding anniversary, the couple renewed their wedding vows on June 4, 2011. As of 2006, they owned a penthouse apartment in North Bergen, New Jersey. In 2012, they were building a five-bedroom house in Edgewater, New Jersey, that was expected to be completed by the end of the year. In 2015, the couple had their first child together, a daughter.

Ice-T has stated on numerous occasions that he is a teetotaler, and lives a straight edge lifestyle. He is a long time practitioner of Brazilian Jiu-Jitsu and boxing, and is a big fan of the UFC.

=== Activism ===
During the popularity of Public Enemy, Ice-T was closely associated with the band and his recordings of the time showed a similar political viewpoint. He was referred to as "The Soldier of the Highest Degree" in the booklet for Fear of a Black Planet and mentioned on the track "Reggie Jax". Ice-T's track This One's For Me included a defense of Professor Griff after the antisemitism controversy and attacked other rappers for not speaking out in his defense. At the Hollywood Walk of Fame ceremony for Ice-T, Chuck D appeared on stage alongside his longtime friend.

Ice-T also collaborated with fellow vocalist and anti-censorship campaigner Jello Biafra on his album The Iceberg/Freedom of Speech... Just Watch What You Say!. He and Biafra appeared on The Oprah Winfrey Show in 1990 to debate Tipper Gore on censorship in music. After the controversy of the Body Count song Cop Killer, Ice-T became an icon for free-speech campaigners, which led to a doubling in album sales. The song was condemned by both George H. W. Bush and Dan Quayle during the 1992 United States presidential election. When he decided to withdraw the song from his album, he replaced it with a metal version of his rap Freedom of Speech. A 2004 Guardian article wrote, "He's toured universities lecturing on first amendment rights and civil liberties and is vocal about the billions wasted on the Iraq war. He insists, however, he'd never get involved in politics."

The last track of OG Original Gangster condemned both the Gulf War and mass incarceration. In 2017, Ice-T signed a petition to Congress for criminal-justice reform.

His 1994 book, The Ice Opinion, was largely focused on his view on politics. Writing in the aftermath of the 1992 Los Angeles riots, he was one of the only rappers who criticized the targeting of Koreans by some Black rioters.

On June 5, 2008, Ice-T joked that he would be voting for John McCain in the 2008 American elections, speculating that his past affiliation with Body Count could hurt Barack Obama's chances if he endorsed him, so he would choose instead to ruin McCain's campaign by saying he supported him. In 2015, Ice-T said that he admired Obama "just for the simple fact he took the shot and went all the way to be president" and included Obama in the list of people who he would like to have for a dream dinner party.

On September 22, 2022, Ice-T narrated an advertisement for the Foundation for Individual Rights and Expression.

=== Personal disputes ===
==== LL Cool J ====
Ice-T had a feud with LL Cool J in the late 1980s and early 1990s. Apparently, this was instigated by LL's claim to be "the baddest rapper in the history of rap itself". Ice-T recorded disses against LL on his 1988 album Power. On the album was the track, "I'm Your Pusher", in which a rap music addict declines to buy an LL Cool J record. In the book Check the Technique: Liner Notes for Hip-Hop Junkies, Ice-T said that the song "Girls L.G.B.N.A.F." was also intended as a diss to LL Cool J, by making a crude song to contrast with the love songs that LL was making at the time.

On LL's response, "To da Break of Dawn" in 1990, he dissed Kool Moe Dee (whose feud with LL was far more publicized) as well as MC Hammer. He then devoted the third verse of the song to dissing Ice-T, mocking his rap ability ("take your rhymes around the corner to rap rehab"), his background ("before you rapped, you was a downtown car thief"), and his style ("a brother with a perm deserves to get burned"). He also suggested that the success of Power was due to the appearance of Ice-T's girlfriend Darlene on the album cover. Ice-T appeared to have ignored the insults and he had also defended LL Cool J after his arrest in the song "Freedom of Speech".

In August 2012, Ice-T said that the rivalry was "never serious" and that he needed a nemesis to create "an exciting dispute".

==== Soulja Boy ====
In June 2008, on DJ Cisco's Urban Legend mixtape, Ice-T criticized Soulja Boy (whose name is DeAndre Way) for "killing hip hop" and called his song "Crank That" "garbage" compared to the works of other hip-hop artists such as Rakim, Das EFX, Big Daddy Kane and Ice Cube. One of the comments exchanged was Ice-T telling Way to "eat a dick". The two then traded numerous videos back and forth over the Internet. These videos included a cartoon and video of Ice-T dancing on Way's behalf and an apology, but reiteration of his feelings that Way's music "sucks", on Ice-T's behalf. Musician Kanye West defended Way saying, "He came from the 'hood, made his own beats, made up a new saying, new sound and a new dance with one song".

== Discography ==
Studio albums

- Rhyme Pays (1987)
- Power (1988)
- The Iceberg/Freedom of Speech...Just Watch What You Say (1989)
- O.G. Original Gangster (1991)
- Home Invasion (1993)
- Ice-T VI: Return of the Real (1996)
- Seventh Deadly Sin (1999)
- Gangsta Rap (2006)
- Criminal Migraine (2026)

with Body Count

- Body Count (1992)
- Born Dead (1994)
- Violent Demise: The Last Days (1997)
- Murder 4 Hire (2006)
- Manslaughter (2014)
- Bloodlust (2017)
- Carnivore (2020)
- Merciless (2024)

Collaboration albums

- Breaking and Entering with The Radio Crew (1983)
- Rhyme Syndicate Comin' Through with Rhyme $yndicate (1988)
- Pimp to Eat with Analog Brothers (2000)
- Repossession with SMG (2004)
- Urban Legends with Black Ice (2008)
- Uncut with Afrika Islam (2021)

== Filmography ==
=== Film ===
Year	Title	Role	Notes
1984	Breakin'	Rap Talker	
1984	Breakin' 2: Electric Boogaloo	Radiotron Rapper	
1985	Rappin'	Himself	
1991	New Jack City	Detective Scotty Appleton	
1991	Ricochet	Odessa	
1992	Trespass	James "King James"	
1992	Why Colors?	Himself	Short
1993	CB4	Himself	
1993	Who's the Man?	Chauncey "Nighttrain" Jackson	
1993	Gift	Himself	Video
1994	Surviving the Game	Jack Mason	
1995	Tank Girl	"T-Saint"	
1995	Johnny Mnemonic	"J-Bone"	
1996	Frankenpenis	Himself	Video
1997	Below Utopia	Jim	
1997	Mean Guns	Vincent Moon	
1997	The Deli	Phil, The Meat Man	
1998	Crazy Six	Raul	
1998	Exiled: A Law & Order Movie	Seymour "Kingston" Stockton	TV movie
1998	Judgment Day	Matthew Reese	Video
1999	Jacob Two Two Meets the Hooded Fang	The Judge	
1999	Urban Menace	The Narrator	Video
1999	Stealth Fighter	Owen Turner	
1999	Final Voyage	Josef	
1999	Sonic Impact	Agent Taja	
1999	The Disciples	The Sensei	TV movie
1999	Corrupt	"Corrupt"	
1999	Frezno Smooth	"DJ Superfly"	
2000	The Wrecking Crew	"Menace"	
2000	Leprechaun in the Hood	"Mack Daddy O'Nasses"	Video
2000	Luck of the Draw	MacNeilly	
2000	The Alternate	Agent Williams	
2000	Point Doom	Ringman	
2001	3000 Miles to Graceland	Hamilton	
2001	Deadly Rhapsody	Wilson	
2001	Tara	Grady	Video
2001	'R Xmas	The Kidnapper	
2001	Kept	Jack Mosler	
2001	Air Rage	Matt Marshall	Video
2001	Guardian	Max	
2001	Ablaze	Albert Denning	
2001	Ticker	Vincent Cruichshank	
2001	Out Kold	"Goldie"	
2001	Gangland	Officer Dunn	
2001	The Heist	"C-Note"	
2002	Stranded	Jeffries	Video
2002	On the Edge	Jim "Slim Jim"	
2003	Crime Partners	"King" Fischer	
2004	Lexie	Rasheed	Video
2004	Up in Harlem	Himself	
2005	Tracks	Officer Brian Clark	
2006	Copy That	Himself	Short
2007	BelzerVizion	Himself	Short
2007	Apartment 309	Detective Shearod	Short
2009	Tommy and the Cool Mule	Jackie A. (voice)	Video
2009	The Magic 7	Dr. Scratch (voice)	TV movie
2010	The Other Guys	The Narrator (voice)	
2013	Santorini Blue	Dr. Lewis	
2013	Once Upon a Time in Brooklyn	Tyler Moss	
2014	Crossed the Line	Miguel	
2015	What Now	Himself	
2015	The Ghetto	Victor	
2016	How We Met	The Narrator	
2017	Bloodrunners	Chesterfield	
2019	Clinton Road	R.J.	
2019	UglyDolls	Peggy (voice)	
2020	Equal Standard	Croft	
2026	Misty Green	Himself	
2027	Snoop	TBA	Filming

=== Television ===
Year	Title	Role	Notes
1983	Fame	Enforcer	Episode: "Break Dance"
1988	MusiCalifornia	Himself	Episode: "L.A. Country"
1990	It's Showtime at the Apollo	Himself	Episode: "Episode 3.24"
1991	Soul Train	Himself	Episode: "Run D.M.C./Ice-T/Oleta Adams"
1991	Sex in the '90s	Himself	Episode: "More Sex in the 90's"
1994	Without Walls	Himself / Host	Episode: "Kiss My Baad Assss Ice-T's Guide to Blaxploitation"
1994–1996	Baadasss TV	Himself / Co-Host	Recurring Co-Host
1995	The History of Rock 'n' Roll	Himself	Episode: "Up from the Underground"
1995	New York Undercover	Danny Up / Danny Cort	Recurring Cast: Season 1, Guest: Season 2
1996	Saturday Night Special	Himself / Host	Episode: "Episode 1.4"
1996	MADtv	Himself / Host	Episode: "Episode 2.2"
1996	Swift Justice	Earl Borgese	Episode: "Takin' Back the Street"
1997	Space Ghost Coast to Coast	Himself	Episode: "Needledrop"
1997	L.A. Heat	Cage	Episode: "Rap Sheet"
1997	Duckman	Himself / Taanzi (voice)	Episode: "A Star Is Abhorred" & "Ebony, Baby"
1997–98	Players	Isaac "Ice" Gregory	Main Cast
1998	Welcome to Paradox	Revell	Episode: "The Winner"
1999	Batman Beyond	Ramrod (voice)	Episode: "Splicers"
1999	V.I.P	The Prophet	2 episodes
1999	Sin City Spectacular	Himself	Episode: "Episode 1.21"
2000	I Love the '70s	Himself	Episode: "I Love 1973"
2000	Behind the Music	Himself	Episode: "Ice-T"
2000–Present	Law & Order: Special Victims Unit	Detective/Sergeant Odafin "Fin" Tutuola	Main Cast: Season 2–
2001	I Love the '80s	Himself	Recurring Guest
2001	Say It Loud! A Celebration of Black Music in America	Himself	Recurring Guest
2001	I Love the '90s	Himself	Recurring Guest
2001	Weakest Link	Himself	Episode: "Scene Stealers Edition"
2001	Hollywood Squares	Himself	Recurring Guest
2002	Beyond Tough	Himself / Host	Main Host
2003	Chappelle's Show	Himself	Episode: "Blackzilla & Playa Haters' Ball"
2003	Star Search	Himself / Guest Judge	Episode: "The One with Guest Judge Ice-T"
2004	I Love the '90s	Himself	Episode: "1992"
2004	And You Don't Stop: 30 Years of Hip-Hop	Himself	Episode: "Back in the Day"
2005	E! True Hollywood Story	Himself	Episode: "Snoop Dogg"
2005	Law & Order	Detective Odafin "Fin" Tutuola	Episode: "Flaw"
2006	The Drug Years	Himself	Episode: "Just Say No! (1980s-Present)"
2006	Hip Hop Honors	Himself / Host	Main Host
2006	Ice-T's Rap School	Himself / Host	Main Host
2007	Comedy Central Roast of Flavor Flav	Himself / Roaster	Episode: "Comedy Central Roast of Flavor Flav"
2007	Sesame Street	Himself	Episode: "Maria the Chicken"
2008	The Greatest	Himself	Episode: "100 Greatest Hip Hop Songs"
2008	Celebrity Family Feud	Himself	Episode: "Episode 1.1"
2009	The Heyman Hustle	Himself	Episode: "Episode 1.15"
2009	TV Land Moguls	Himself	Episode: "The '90s"
2009	Black to the Future	Himself	Episode: "Hour 4: The 00s"
2009	I Get That a Lot	Himself	Episode: "Episode 1.1"
2010	All Star Mr & Mrs	Himself	Episode: "Episode 3.2"
2010	30 for 30	Himself	Episode: "Straight Outta L.A."
2010	Kathy Griffin: My Life on the D-List	Himself	Episode: "Kathy With a Z"
2011–2013	Ice Loves Coco	Himself	Main Cast
2011–2013	30 Rock	Detective Odafin "Fin" Tutuola	Episode: "¡Qué Sorpresa!" & "Hogcock!"
2011	Full Throttle Saloon	Himself	Episode: "Episode 2.9"
2011	Celebrity Close Calls	Himself	Episode: "Ice-T/Cheryl Tiegs/Ed Begley Jr/Yancy Butler"
2012	E! True Hollywood Story	Himself	Episode: "Ice-T & Coco"
2013	Criss Angel Believe	Himself	Episode: "Cement Grave"
2013	Chrissy & Mr. Jones	Himself	Episode: "Popping Off"
2014	Celebrities Undercover	Himself	Episode: "Ice-T & Coco"
2014	Celebrity Crime Files	Himself / The Narrator	Main Narrator
2014	Amp'd Up	Himself	Episode: "Beat Poetry"
2014–2016	Chicago P.D.	Detective Odafin "Fin" Tutuola	Guest Cast: Season 1–3
2015	Ice & Coco	Himself / Co-Host	Main Co-Host
2015	Randy Cunningham: 9th Grade Ninja	Superintendent (voice)	Episode: "The Fresh Principal of Norrisville High"
2016	Love & Hip Hop: New York	Himself	Episode: "Love & Hip Hop: New York"
2016	Hip-Hop Evolution	Himself	Recurring Guest: Season 1
2016	Younger	Himself	Episode: "Secrets & Liza"
2016	Unbreakable Kimmy Schmidt	Himself	Episode: "Kimmy Sees a Sunset!"
2016–2017	Unsung Hollywood	Himself	Recurring Guest
2017	Hollywood Medium	Himself	Episode: "Nico Tortorella/Ice-T & Coco Austin/Alan Thicke"
2017	Party Legends	Himself	Episode: "Sexy Kurt Cobain"
2017	Unsung	Himself	Episode: "Ice-T"
2017	The $100,000 Pyramid	Himself / Celebrity Player	Episode: "Kyle Busch vs. Lara Spencer and Ice-T vs. Peri Gilpin"
2017–2018	Match Game	Himself / Celebrity Panelist	Guest Panelist: Season 2-3
2018	Rock & Roll Road Trip with Sammy Hagar	Himself	Episode: "L.A. Metal"
2018	The Joel McHale Show with Joel McHale	Himself	Episode: "Michael!"
2018	David Tutera's Celebrations	Himself	Episode: "Ice-T and Coco Throw A Baby Shower"
2018	Celebrity Family Feud	Himself	Episode: "Episode 5.9"
2018	American Dad!	Himself (voice)	Episode: "The Census of the Lamb"
2018–2021	In Ice Cold Blood	Himself / Host	Main Host
2019	Untold Stories of Hip Hop	Himself	Episode: "Ice-T, Swizz Beatz & Wyclef"
2019	Deadly Class	Ice-T Slot Machine (voice)	Episode: "Saudade"
2019	Saturday Night Live	Sergeant Odafin "Fin" Tutuola	Episode: "Kit Harington/Sara Bareilles"
2020	Yo Mama	Himself	Episode: "I PAID Celebs $3,000 for YO MAMA JOKES"
2020	Martha Knows Best	Himself	Episode: "Martha Claus is Coming to Town"
2020	The Masked Dancer	Himself / Disco Ball	Episode: "Premiere - Everybody Mask Now!"
2021	Straight Up Steve Austin	Himself	Episode: "Ice-T"
2021	Hip Hop Uncovered	Himself	Main Guest
2021	The Mediator	Himself / Host	Main Host
2021	Bubble Guppies	Garbage Khan (Voice)	Episode "A Load of Litterbugs!"
2021–2023	Law & Order: Organized Crime	Sergeant Odafin "Fin" Tutuola	Guest Cast: Season 2–3
2022	Origins of Hip Hop	Himself	Episode: "Ice-T"
2022	Betraying the Badge	Himself / The Narrator	Main Narrator
2022	Saturday Night Live	Larry "Light Skin Larry" Targaryen	Episode: "Dave Chappelle/Black Star"
2023	Fight the Power: How Hip-Hop Changed the World	Himself	Main Guest
2023	Celebrity Game Face	Himself / Contestant	Episode: "Music Icons Edition"
2023	Rewind the '90s	Himself	Main Guest
2023	Hip Hop Treasures	Himself / Host	Main Host
2023	Rick and Morty	Magma "Q" (voice)	Episode: "Rise of the Numbericons: The Movie"
2023	Barmageddon	Himself	Episode: "Blake Shelton's Holiday Bartacular ft. Ice T"
2024	Countdown: Paul vs. Tyson	Himself	Narrator
2026	Survival of the Thickest	Charcoal Jackson	Episode: "Happy New Year's, Bitch!"
2026	Nation's Dumbest	Himself	Graduated Episode 6

=== Documentary ===
Year	Title
1983	Breakin N Enterin
1990	Rap City Rhapsody
1990	Listen Up: The Lives of Quincy Jones
1990	RapMania: The Roots of Rap
1994	The Legend of Dolemite
1997	Star Wars: The Magic & the Mystery
1997	Rhyme & Reason
1998	Pimps Up, Ho's Down
1999	Hollywood: Wild in the Streets
2000	Straight from the Streets
2000	Hip Hop 2000
2001	Porn Star: The Legend of Ron Jeremy
2002	Big Pun Still Not a Player
2003	Beef
2003	Cwalk: It's a Way of Livin
2003	Tupac: Resurrection
2004	Beef II
2004	Prison Ball
2005	Fuck
2005	There's a God on the Mic
2008	A Family Underground
2009	Good Hair
2010	GhettoPhysics
2010	Sounds Like a Revolution
2011	The (R)evolution of Immortal Technique
2011	Planet Rock: The Story of Hip-Hop and the Crack Generation
2011	Give it up for Greg Giraldo
2012	Something from Nothing: The Art of Rap
2012	Iceberg Slim: Portrait of a Pimp
2013	Assaulted: Civil Rights Under Fire
2019	Public Enemy Number One
2020	Biography: The Nine Lives of Ozzy Osbourne
2022	Cypress Hill: Insane in the Brain
2023	Justa Geta Record Deal : It All Makes Sense Now
2023	Freestyle 101: Hip Hop History
2024	Celebrity Boxing: The 16th Minute
2024	It Was All a Dream

=== Video games ===
Year	Title	Voice role	Notes
1993	Prime Mover	Unknown Role	Amiga
2000	Sanity: Aiken's Artifact	Agent Nathaniel Cain	
2002	UFC: Tapout	Himself	
2004	Def Jam Fight for NY	Himself	Voice and likeness
2004	Grand Theft Auto: San Andreas	"Madd Dogg"	
2006	Scarface: The World Is Yours	John Johnson	
2006	Def Jam Fight for NY: The Takeover	Himself	
2011	Gears of War 3	Aaron Griffin	Voice and likeness
2019	Borderlands 3	Balex	
2021	Grand Theft Auto: The Trilogy - The Definitive Edition	"Madd Dogg"	Archival recordings Remaster of Grand Theft Auto: San Andreas only
2023	Payday 3	Mac	Voice and likeness

== Awards and nominations ==
=== Grammy Awards ===
Year	Nominated work	Award	Result
1991	"Back on the Block"	Best Rap Performance by a Duo or Group	Won
1992	"New Jack Hustler (Nino's Theme)"	Best Rap Solo Performance	Nominated
2018	"Black Hoodie"	Best Metal Performance	Nominated
2021	"Bum-Rush"	Best Metal Performance	Won

=== MTV Video Music Awards ===
Year	Nominated work	Award	Result
1989	"Colors"	Best Rap Video	Nominated
1989	"Colors"	Best Video from a Film	Nominated
1991	"New Jack Hustler (Nino's Theme)"	Best Rap Video	Nominated

=== MTV Movie Awards ===
Year	Nominated work	Award	Result
1992	New Jack City	Best Breakthrough Performance	Nominated

=== Image Awards ===
Year	Nominated work	Award	Result
1996	New York Undercover	Outstanding Supporting Actor in a Drama Series	Won
2002	Law & Order: Special Victims Unit	Outstanding Supporting Actor in a Drama Series	Won
2004	Law & Order: Special Victims Unit	Outstanding Supporting Actor in a Drama Series	Nominated
2006	Law & Order: Special Victims Unit	Outstanding Actor in a Drama Series	Nominated
2012	Law & Order: Special Victims Unit	Outstanding Supporting Actor in a Drama Series	Nominated

=== Adult Video News Awards ===
Year	Nominated work	Award	Result
2004	"Pimpin' 101"	Best Non-Sex Performance - Film or Video	Nominated

=== News & Documentary Emmy Award ===
Year	Nominated work	Award	Result
2012	"Planet Rock: The Story of Hip-Hop and the Crack Generation"	Outstanding Arts & Culture Programming	Nominated

=== All Def Movie Awards ===
Year	Nominated work	Award	Result
2016	Surviving the Game	Best Black Survivor in a Movie	Nominated

== Bibliography ==
- The Ice Opinion: Who Gives a Fuck? (1994), with Heidi Siegmund
- Ice: A Memoir of Gangster Life and Redemption – from South Central to Hollywood (2011), with Douglas Century
- Split Decision: Life Stories (2022), with Spike and Douglas Century
- Death for Hire: The Origin of Tehk City (2023), with Arabian Prince

Kings of Vice novel series

- Kings of Vice (2011), with Mal Radcliff
- Mirror Image (2013), with Jorge Hinojosa
