= Evil E =

- Also known as: D.J. Evil-E 'The Great'
- Born: Eric Garcia; January 3, 1964 (age 62)
- Origin: Westside Los Angeles, California
- Genres: Latin hip hop; hip hop; gangsta rap
- Occupation: Disc jockey
- Years active: 1984–present
- Labels: Rhyme $yndicate; Sire; Warner Bros. Records; Pendulum Records

Eric Garcia (born January 3, 1964), professionally known by his stage name Evil E, is an American disc jockey. He's best known as the DJ for Ice-T, who brought him in to his production company Rhyme Syndicate in the mid-1980s. He is the brother of fellow rapper Henry "Hen-Gee" Garcia, with whom he formed the duo Spinmasters.

== Career ==
Eric Garcia was born January 3, 1964, to Honduran parents and grew up in Brooklyn, New York with his brother Henry. They both appeared in the 1985 film Rappin' alongside Ice-T. They removed to the West Coast and joined Ice-T's Rhyme Syndicate, wherein Eric provided scratches serving as a deejay. Evil E appeared on the front covers of Ice-T's first two albums.

He appeared on the spoken word track "Evil E-What About Sex?" on the Ice-T's O.G. Original Gangster album, and raps on Ice-T's track "Pimp Behind the Wheels" on the Home Invasion album. Later on, in 1991, he released a full-length album with Hen-Gee, titled Brothers (Pendulum/Elektra), which spawned singles: "Lil Trig" (peaked at #15 on the Hot Rap Songs) and "If U Were Mine" (peaked at #85 on the Hot R&B/Hip-Hop Songs).

Evil E and Hen-Gee were managed by Guy Oseary, an independent Artists and Repertoire (A&R) representative in 1989.

Although Evil E's contribution to Ice-T's records became less prominent after 1993, he was still touring with Ice-T as late as 2018.

== Brothers track listing ==
1. "Cum' On" – 4:33
2. "Lil Trig" – 4:43
3. "I Ain't Seen Nuttin'" – 4:09
4. "Open Your Eyes" – 5:05
5. "Brothers" – 4:52
6. "Mama's Baybe" – 3:36
7. "He Say She Say" – 4:13
8. "Who's That" – 5:04
9. "If U Were Mine" – 4:53
10. "Wanted Her" – 4:46
11. "Guess Who?" – 4:08
12. "Hermana Tan Linda" – 3:55
