= Dave Halili =

American illustrator

- Born: David M. Halili; April 30, 1968 (age 58); Fullerton, California, U.S.
- Known for: Painting / drawing / graphics / illustration / digital art / printmaking / textile arts / screen printing
- Notable work: Ice-T album covers
- Movement: Social realism / graffiti / symbolism/ urban art / street art / hip hop / b-boying
- Other name: H~Style

Body Count album cover, featuring artwork by Halili

Dave Halili (born April 30, 1968) is a contemporary American fine arts illustrator, graffiti writer and graphic designer of album cover paintings, posters, logos, T-shirts along with other forms of representational merchandise. His best-known works are album covers for Body Count (Body Count, Born Dead), Ice-T (Home Invasion, VI - Return of the Real), The Skeletones (Skeletones Red) and Moon Ska Records compilation California Ska-Quake. An array of collaborations in the Hollywood entertainment industry and indie music scene have garnered him a Diamond record plaque, three Platinum awards, three Gold records and two Gold Europe plaques certified and registered by the RIAA.

== Career ==
Halili has also worked with N.W.A, No Doubt, Gwen Stefani, Kurtis Blow, Donald D, King Tee, Stone Temple Pilots, Everlast, Monie Love, Ednaswap, Fishbone /Angelo Moore, Autolux, Carla Azar, Gripsta, Keith Sweat, Afrika Islam, DJ Evil E, Prince Whipper Whip, Grandmaster Caz, D-Roc the Executioner, Tim Story & T.D.F., Hijack, Lord Finesse, Dance Hall Crashers, The Toasters, Royal Crown Revue, Hepcat, Let's Go Bowling, Robert "Bucket" Hingley, Reel Big Fish, DJ Yutaka, DJ Honda and Zebrahead.

=== Body Count album cover ===
Halili's artwork on the cover of Body Count came to symbolize the band's song "Cop Killer", which was widely criticized by the authorities, and raised questions about the boundaries between artistic freedom and censorship. This controversy, together with an executive clash over Halili's proposed montage for the jacket of Home Invasion, forced Ice-T to leave Warner Bros. Records. On March 23, 1993, Ice-T released the album with Halili's original illustration, produced by his own record label Rhyme $yndicate Records.

== Personal life ==
Halili resides and works in Orange County, California, where he runs a studio and screen printing workshop named Halili-Style Graphics & More.

Halili is a lifetime member of the Universal Zulu Nation and the Los Angeles-based Rhyme $yndicate. A friendship between Halili and TV producer Michael G. Moye led to a business arrangement where Halili designed and manufactured media publicity products for Fox's first prime-time TV sitcom Married... with Children.

== Art style and impact ==
Dave Halili is known for his graffiti street art style, which makes his work stand out from other street artists. His art often incorporates elements of social realism and street art, reflecting real-life issues and urban culture, giving his pieces a gritty, authentic feel that resonates with viewers. His bold and provocative themes, such as police brutality and social justice, have made a significant cultural impact, particularly within the hip hop and urban art communities. Halili's work has been featured in various media, contributing to important cultural conversations.
