= There Goes the Neighborhood (Body Count song) =

Single by Body Count

from the album Body Count
- B-side: "KKK Bitch"
- Released: March 12, 1992
- Genre: Heavy metal
- Length: 5:50
- Label: Rhyme $yndicate; Sire; Warner Bros.
- Songwriter(s): Tracy Lauren Marrow; Ernie Cunnigan
- Producer(s): Ice-T; Ernie C.

Body Count singles chronology
"There Goes the Neighborhood" (1992)	"Cop Killer" (1992)

"There Goes the Neighborhood" is a song written and produced by Ice-T and Ernie C and performed by American heavy metal band Body Count. It was released on March 12, 1992 via Rhyme $yndicate/Sire/Warner Records as the lead single from the band's self-titled debut studio album, Body Count.

The song peaked at number 35 in New Zealand. In 2023, Rolling Stone ranked the song at number 85 on their list of the 100 greatest heavy metal songs of all time.

For the accompanying music video, the word "nigga" was replaced with the phrase "black boys" in the lyrics of the song.

== Track listing ==
CD single
No.	Title	Length
1.	"There Goes the Neighborhood" (Radio Edit)	4:01
2.	"There Goes the Neighborhood" (Album Version)	5:50
3.	"KKK Bitch" (Live)	3:44
4.	"KKK Bitch" (Album Version)	2:53

CS
No.	Title	Length
1.	"There Goes the Neighborhood" (Album Version)	5:50
2.	"Evil Dick" (Album Version)	3:59

== Personnel ==
- Tracy "Ice-T" Marrow — songwriter, lead vocals, producer
- Ernie Cunnigan — songwriter, lead guitar, producer
- Dennis "D-Roc" Miles — rhythm guitar
- Lloyd "Mooseman" Roberts III — bass
- Victor Ray "Beatmaster V" Wilson — drums
- Bernard Matthews — engineering
- Howie Klein — executive producer
- Robin Lynch — art direction
- Dirk Walter — design
- Dave Halili — illustration
- Jorge Hinojosa — management

== Charts ==
Chart (1992)	Peak position
New Zealand (Recorded Music NZ)	35
