= Murder 4 Hire =

Studio album by Body Count
- Released: August 1, 2006
- Studio: Bill's Place & Ameraycan (North Hollywood, California)
- Genre: Rap metal, thrash metal, groove metal
- Length: 44:53
- Label: Escapi Music
- Producer: Ernie C; Ice-T

Body Count chronology
Violent Demise: The Last Days (1997)	Murder 4 Hire (2006)	Manslaughter (2014)

Singles from Murder 4 Hire
- 1. "Relationships" Released: 2006

Professional ratings
Review scores
Source	Rating
About.com	2.5/5 stars
AllMusic	3/5 stars
Blabbermouth.net	0/10

Murder 4 Hire is the fourth studio album by American heavy metal band Body Count. Released on August 1, 2006, this was the first album from Body Count in nine years. It is the band's first album following the deaths of drummer Beatmaster V and rhythm guitarist D-Roc the Executioner in 1996 and 2004, respectively. Although, D-Roc did contribute to the album before he died, and work on the album had come to a pause as a result of D-Roc's death. The rest of the rhythm guitar tracks were handled by Bendrix. It is the only album to feature O.T. on drums and the only one recorded without sampler and backing vocalist Sean E Sean. It is also their first album recorded without hype man Sean E. Mac.

Frontman Ice-T later told Esquire Magazine he was not satisfied with the way the album came out because he was not as involved in the project as he usually tries to be.

"I kinda mailed it in. They wrote the music in L.A. and sent me the tracks, I wrote the lyrics, and I just kinda walked away. I didn't mix it, I didn't do anything to it, and the record suffered."

— Ice-T, Esquire Magazine

== Live DVD ==
In 2005, a companion live concert DVD titled Body Count: Murder 4 Hire was released to capture the band's 2004 reunion tour, which coincided with the recording of the album. The 90-minute film features the uncensored, full-length performance from their San Francisco stop on the Warped Tour. The release showcases live renditions of classic tracks such as "Cop Killer," "KKK Bitch," and "Voodoo," alongside behind-the-scenes footage and exclusive interviews with band members Ernie C and D-Roc, as well as punk rock musician Jello Biafra.

== Track listing ==
All tracks composed by Ice-T and Ernie C; except where indicated.

No.	Title	Writer(s)	Length
1.	"Invincible Gangsta" (featuring Trigga tha Gambler)		3:59
2.	"The End Game"	Ice-T, Ernie C, O. T.	4:13
3.	"You Don't Know Me (Pain)"		4:12
4.	"The Passion of Christ"		3:11
5.	"In My Head"		4:04
6.	"D Rocs (R.I.P.)"		2:32
7.	"Murder 4 Hire"		3:26
8.	"Down in the Bayou"		3:34
9.	"Dirty Bombs"		3:45
10.	"Lies"		4:24
11.	"Relationships"		4:30
12.	"Mr. C's Theme"		3:03
Total length:			44:53

== Personnel ==
- Ice-T – lead vocals
- Ernie C – lead guitar
- D-Roc the Executioner – rhythm guitar
- Bendrix – rhythm guitar
- Vincent Price – bass
- O. T. – drums

=== Guest musician ===
- Trigga tha Gambler – guest vocals on "Invincible Gangsta"
