= Born Dead =

Studio album by Body Count
- Released: September 6, 1994
- Recorded: 1994
- Genres: Rap metal; crossover thrash
- Length: 47:16
- Label: Virgin
- Producers: Ernie-C, Ice-T

Body Count chronology
Body Count (1992)	Born Dead (1994)	Violent Demise: The Last Days (1997)

Singles from Born Dead
- 1. "Hey Joe" Released: 1993; 2. "Born Dead" Released: 1994; 3. "Necessary Evil" Released: 1994

Professional ratings
Review scores
Source	Rating
AllMusic	2/5 stars
Christgau's Consumer Guide	(neither)
Entertainment Weekly	B
The Guardian	1/4 stars
Kerrang!	4/5 stars
NME	7/10
Q	3/5 stars
Rolling Stone	2.5/5 stars
The Rolling Stone Album Guide	2/5 stars
Spin Alternative Record Guide	5/10

Born Dead is the second studio album by American heavy metal band Body Count. The album was released on September 6, 1994.

Lyrical subject matter includes war ("Shallow Graves"), drugs ("Street Lobotomy"), death ("Surviving the Game"), murder ("Last Breath") and the mosh pit ("Killin' Floor").

Among other tracks, the album features a cover of Billy Roberts' "Hey Joe," performed in the style of Jimi Hendrix' recording of the song, as originally featured on the Are You Experienced album. Body Count's cover of the song was first featured on the Hendrix tribute album Stone Free: A Tribute to Jimi Hendrix.

In the liner notes, Ice-T dedicates the album "to all the people of color throughout the entire world: Asian, Latino, Native American, Hawaiian, Italian, Indian, Persian, African, Aboriginal and any other nationality that white supremacists would love to see born dead." Born Dead peaked at #74 on the Billboard 200.

It's the last album to feature Mooseman on bass, since he left the band prior the recording of their next album, Violent Demise: The Last Days, and he was murdered in 2001 on a drive-by shooting.

== Track listing ==
No.	Title	Writer(s)	Length
1.	"Body M/F Count"	Ice-T, Ernie-C	2:14
2.	"Masters of Revenge"	Ice-T, D-Roc	5:20
3.	"Killin' Floor"	Ice-T, D-Roc	2:21
4.	"Necessary Evil"	Mooseman	3:59
5.	"Drive By"	Ice-T, Mooseman	1:26
6.	"Last Breath"	Ice-T, Ernie-C	5:18
7.	"Hey Joe"	Billy Roberts	4:28
8.	"Shallow Graves"	Ice-T, Ernie-C, D-Roc	4:12
9.	"Surviving the Game"	Ice-T, Ernie-C, Mooseman	5:41
10.	"Who Are You"	Ice-T, Ernie-C	3:48
11.	"Street Lobotomy"	Ice-T, D-Roc	2:24
12.	"Born Dead"	Ice-T, Ernie-C, D-Roc, Mooseman	5:59
Total length:			47:16

== Personnel ==
- Ice-T – lead vocals
- Ernie C – lead guitar, acoustic guitar
- D-Roc the Executioner – rhythm guitar
- Mooseman – bass, co-lead vocals on necessary evil
- Beatmaster V – drums
- Sean E Sean – sampler, backing vocals
- Sean E. Mac – hype man, backing vocals

== Charts ==
=== Weekly charts ===
Weekly chart performance for Born Dead
Chart (1994)	Peak position
Australian Albums (ARIA)	5
Austrian Albums (Ö3 Austria)	5
Dutch Albums (Album Top 100)	27
German Albums (Offizielle Top 100)	5
Hungarian Albums (MAHASZ)	7
New Zealand Albums (RMNZ)	16
Portuguese Albums (AFP)	19
Scottish Albums (Official Charts)	22
Swedish Albums (Sverigetopplistan)	24
Swiss Albums (Schweizer Hitparade)	10
UK Albums (Official Charts)	15
US Billboard 200	74

=== Year-end charts ===
1994 year-end chart performance for Born Dead
Chart (1994)	Position
German Albums (Offizielle Top 100)	61
