= Manslaughter (album) =

Studio album by Body Count
- Released: June 10, 2014
- Recorded: 2013–2014
- Genre: Rap metal, groove metal, thrash metal
- Length: 50:15
- Label: Sumerian Records
- Producer: Will Putney

Body Count chronology
Murder 4 Hire (2006)	Manslaughter (2014)	Bloodlust (2017)

Singles from Manslaughter
- 1. "Talk Shit, Get Shot" Released: May 19, 2014

Manslaughter is the fifth studio album by American heavy metal band Body Count. The album was released on June 10, 2014, by Sumerian Records. It is the first album to feature new rhythm guitarist Juan of the Dead and new drummer Ill Will. The album also features the return of sampler Sean E Sean, who rejoined the group in 2008.

== Background ==
On December 9, 2012, Ice-T announced on Twitter that Body Count would begin production on a fifth studio album in January 2013. The following day, Ice-T revealed that Body Count has signed with Sumerian Records. Ice-T suggested that the album was going to be titled Rise! or Manslaughter.

On May 10, 2013, Ice-T announced that work on the fifth studio album had begun and that it would be entitled Manslaughter. The album was released on June 10, 2014. On May 19, 2014, the album's first single "Talk Shit, Get Shot" was released. On May 21, 2014, the music video was released for "Talk Shit, Get Shot".

== Critical response ==
Professional ratings
Aggregate scores
Source	Rating
Metacritic	72/100
Review scores
Source	Rating
AllMusic	3/5 stars
All About the Rock	10/10 stars
Alternative Press	4/5 stars
Consequence of Sound	B−
RapReviews	5.5/10
Rock Sound	7/10
Rolling Stone	3/5 stars

According to the review aggregator Metacritic, Manslaughter received "generally favorable reviews" based on a weighted average score of 72 out of 100 from 6 critic scores.

Gregory Heaney of AllMusic gave the album three out of five stars, saying "At this stage, Body Count haven't changed much, and really aren't likely to, which means that if you were on board with their earlier work, then Manslaughter has even more rap-influenced metal to fuel your rage. However, if you weren't sold on these guys in the first place, this album isn't likely to change your mind." While Craig Hogan of All About The Rock said "This is quite possibly the best album BC have ever released." Phil Freeman of Alternative Press gave the album four out of five stars, saying "Manslaughter is a ferocious, heavy record that proves once again that Ice-T and company are undeniable metal contenders, far more than a pop-cultural footnote." Jon Hadusek of Consequence of Sound gave the album a B−, saying "Lyrically and musically, Manslaughter is easily Body Count's most inspired work since their self-titled debut, because it sounds like a reconciliation of all the misconceptions the band had to deal with in the past. It's a statement of intent this time: They want to be heard, no matter who gets offended or pissed off. If you can't take it, don't listen. If you can, then stop talking shit and enjoy the ride."

== Track listing ==
All tracks are written by Ernie C, Ice-T and Vincent Price except where noted.

No.	Title	Writer(s)	Length
1.	"Talk Shit, Get Shot"	Ernie C, Ice-T, Vincent Price, Will Putney	3:47
2.	"Pray for Death"	Ernie C, Ice-T, Vincent Price, Will Putney	3:40
3.	"99 Problems BC"	Ice-T	3:09
4.	"Back to Rehab"	Ernie C, Ice-T, Vincent Price, Will Putney	3:25
5.	"Manslaughter"		3:13
6.	"Get a Job"		3:01
7.	"Institutionalized 2014"	Mike Muir, Louiche Mayorga, Ice-T	3:46
8.	"Pop Bubble" (featuring Jamey Jasta)	Ernie C, Ice-T, Vincent Price, Will Putney	3:24
9.	"Enter the Dark Side"		3:30
10.	"Bitch in the Pit"		3:00
11.	"Black Voodoo Sex"		3:58
12.	"Wanna Be a Gangsta"		3:45
13.	"I Will Always Love You"		5:14
14.	"99 Problems BC (Rock Mix)"	Ice-T	3:22
Total length:			50:20

== Personnel ==
- Ice-T – lead vocals
- Ernie C – lead guitar
- Juan of the Dead – rhythm guitar
- Vincent Price – bass
- Ill Will – drums
- Sean E Sean – sampler, backing vocals

=== Guest musician ===
- Jamey Jasta – guest vocals on "Pop Bubble"

== Charts ==
Chart (2014)	Peak position
Belgian Albums (Ultratop Flanders)	143
Belgian Albums (Ultratop Wallonia)	129
German Albums (Offizielle Top 100)	92
UK Rock & Metal Albums (Official Charts)	33
UK Independent Albums (Official Charts)	43
US Billboard 200	102
US Top Current Album Sales (Billboard)	87
US Independent Albums (Billboard)	19
US Top Hard Rock Albums (Billboard)	8
US Top Rock Albums (Billboard)	30
