= Violent Demise: The Last Days =

Studio album by Body Count
- Released: March 11, 1997
- Recorded: 1996
- Genre: Rap metal, speed metal
- Length: 46:18
- Label: Virgin
- Producer: Howard Benson

Body Count chronology
Born Dead (1994)	Violent Demise: The Last Days (1997)	Murder 4 Hire (2006)

Singles from Violent Demise: The Last Days
- 1. "I Used to Love Her" Released: 1997

Violent Demise: The Last Days is the third studio album by American heavy metal band Body Count. The album was released on March 11, 1997, by Virgin Records. It is the last album to feature drummer Beatmaster V, who died of leukemia following the recording of the album, which is dedicated to him. It is also the final full album to feature rhythm guitarist D-Roc the Executioner, who died from lymphoma during production of their next album Murder 4 Hire. It also marks the last appearance of sampler Sean E Sean and hype man Sean E. Mac, who both departed the band in 2001. Sean E Sean would return to the group in 2008, but Ice T's son Little Ice replaced Sean E. Mac in 2016.

== Lyrics and themes ==
Among other subjects, the album features songs focusing on topical subjects such as the O. J. Simpson murder case ("I Used To Love Her") and Dr. Jack Kevorkian ("Dr. K"). The cover art depicts the hand signs of the gangs Bloods and Crips, which share the same initials as the band's name.

On January 15, 2018, the track "Dr. K" was quoted in the British Parliament by the MP Alex Sobel, who said that the lyrics did not glorify Xanax but gave "the grim reality".

== Critical reception ==
Professional ratings
Review scores
Source	Rating
AllMusic	3/5 stars
Christgau's Consumer Guide	(neither)
E! Online	F
Metal Hammer	4/5 stars
NME	6/10
Rock Hard	9/10
The Rolling Stone Album Guide	1/5 stars
Vox	6/10

AllMusic's Stephen Thomas Erlewine called it a "significant improvement" over Born Dead, saying: "Even though the music has more punch than before, it doesn't have the ridiculous sense of humor that made Body Count a gonzo classic of sorts, but the sheer force of the record is a welcome change of pace from a band that seemed incapable of true sonic power." Stephen Dalton of NME called Violent Demise "their most fleshed-out and bowel-quakingly heavy opus yet, boring deep into metal's dirty heart and striking pure ugliness. Body Count's music may not be pretty, soothing or particularly progressive in outlook, but it still rocks like there's no tomorrow." A writer for E! Online critiqued that "Ice-T continues to go way over the top trying to prove he ain't no soft drink. His profanity-laced rap-metal fusion diatribes are bound to disappoint fans of either genre--there's no flash in the music or in the rap."

== Track listing ==
No.	Title	Length
1.	"Interview"	1:08
2.	"My Way" (featuring Raw Breed)	3:11
3.	"Strippers Intro"	0:18
4.	"Strippers"	4:33
5.	"Truth or Death"	3:14
6.	"Violent Demise"	3:44
7.	"Bring It to Pain"	4:27
8.	"Music Business"	0:12
9.	"I Used to Love Her"	3:16
10.	"Root of All Evil"	4:23
11.	"Dead Man Walking"	4:50
12.	"Interview End"	0:21
13.	"You're Fuckin' with BC"	3:29
14.	"Ernie's Intro"	0:15
15.	"Dr. K"	2:48
16.	"Last Days"	6:03
17.	"The Law" (Japanese edition bonus track - alternative version of "I Used to Love Her")	3:23
Total length:		49:44

== Personnel ==
- Ice-T – lead vocals
- Ernie C – lead guitar, guitar synthesizer
- D-Roc the Executioner – rhythm guitar
- Griz – bass, lead vocals, loops and samples
- Beatmaster V – drums
- Jonathon "the Kidd" James – drums
- Sean E Sean – sampler, backing vocals
- Sean E. Mac – hype man, backing vocals

=== Guest musicians ===
- Raw Breed – vocals on "My Way"
