= Stone Free: A Tribute to Jimi Hendrix =

1993 compilation album by various artists

Compilation album by various artists
- Released: November 9, 1993
- Length: 62:52
- Label: Reprise

Professional ratings
Review scores
| Source | Rating |
|---|---|
| AllMusic | 2/5 stars |

Stone Free: A Tribute to Jimi Hendrix is a 1993 album recorded by various artists in tribute to Jimi Hendrix. The artists were drawn from many genres of popular music. Contributors include his classic rock contemporaries Eric Clapton and Jeff Beck, blues man Buddy Guy, classical violinist Nigel Kennedy, alternative pop/rock bands Belly and Spin Doctors, hip hop artists P. M. Dawn, among others. According to the liner notes, the "artists were encouraged to not only record one of their own personal favorites but to also place their stamp on Jimi's songs." Several artists recorded radically different interpretations, particularly, P. M. Dawn, The Cure, Nigel Kennedy and Pat Metheny. Some artists, on the other hand, recorded versions that were rather similar to the originals.

The band M.A.C.C. is made up of Mike McCready (guitarist from Pearl Jam), Jeff Ament (bassist from Pearl Jam), Matt Cameron (drummer for Soundgarden and later for Pearl Jam), and Chris Cornell (singer of Soundgarden and later Audioslave). The cover of "Hey Baby (Land of the New Rising Sun)" is their only known recording. All four members of this group had previously worked together on the Temple of the Dog project, and the song "Hey Baby (Land of the New Rising Sun)" was added to Temple of the Dog's live set in 2016.

Eric Clapton's backing group on the title track includes the three original core members of Chic (Nile Rodgers, Bernard Edwards and Tony Thompson) and is the last recording on which all three played together. His cover of the song reached #43 in the Canadian RPM charts.

The album itself reached #42 in Canada and was on the charts for 18 weeks.

== Track listing ==
All tracks are written by Jimi Hendrix, except "Hey Joe" (by Billy Roberts)

| No. | Title | Performer | Length |
|---|---|---|---|
| 1. | "Purple Haze" (produced by Robert Smith and Bryan "Chuck" New) | The Cure | 5:19 |
| 2. | "Stone Free" (produced by Nile Rodgers) | Eric Clapton | 4:25 |
| 3. | "Spanish Castle Magic" (produced by Eddie Kramer) | Spin Doctors | 4:06 |
| 4. | "Red House" (produced by Eddie Kramer) | Buddy Guy | 3:48 |
| 5. | "Hey Joe" (produced by Ernie C) | Body Count | 4:28 |
| 6. | "Manic Depression" (produced by Jeff Beck, Eddie Kramer and Seal) | Seal and Jeff Beck | 5:11 |
| 7. | "Fire" (produced by Nigel Kennedy) | Nigel Kennedy | 4:39 |
| 8. | "Bold as Love" (produced by Stephen Street) | Pretenders | 3:23 |
| 9. | "You Got Me Floatin'" (produced by P. M. Dawn) | P.M. Dawn | 4:49 |
| 10. | "I Don't Live Today" (produced by Eddie Kramer) | Slash, Paul Rodgers and Band of Gypsys | 4:32 |
| 11. | "Are You Experienced?" (produced by Paul Q. Kolderie and Sean Slade) | Belly | 3:38 |
| 12. | "Crosstown Traffic" (produced by Ron Saint Germain) | Living Colour | 3:10 |
| 13. | "Third Stone from the Sun" (produced by Pat Metheny) | Pat Metheny | 6:00 |
| 14. | "Hey Baby (Land of the New Rising Sun)" | M.A.C.C. | 5:26 |
