= Bloodlust (Body Count album) =

Studio album by Body Count
- Released: March 31, 2017
- Recorded: 2016
- Genre: Rap metal; thrash metal; groove metal; spoken word
- Length: 41:00
- Label: Century Media
- Producer: Will Putney

Body Count chronology
Manslaughter (2014)	Bloodlust (2017)	Carnivore (2020)

Singles from Bloodlust
- 1. "No Lives Matter" Released: February 17, 2017; 2. "Black Hoodie" Released: March 24, 2017; 3. "The Ski Mask Way" Released: May 17, 2017; 4. "Here I Go Again" Released: June 21, 2017; 5. "Raining In Blood / Postmortem 2017" Released: July 18, 2017; 6. "This Is Why We Ride" Released: October 3, 2017; 7. "All Love Is Lost" Released: May 17, 2018

Bloodlust is the sixth album by the American heavy metal band Body Count, released March 31, 2017, by Century Media Records. It is their first recording with new hype man Little Ice, the son of frontman Ice-T.

In its first week, it debuted at number 3 in the UK Rock and Metal Chart. The track "Here I Go Again" is a re-recording of a demo track from frontman Ice-T's Return of the Real sessions. The track "Black Hoodie" was nominated for Best Metal Performance at the 60th Annual Grammy Awards. The second track, "No Lives Matter", addresses the role of race in social inequality. "All Love Is Lost" is about husbands who are having an affair with their mistresses behind their wives' backs and features Max Cavalera on guitar and vocals. The video features Ice-T's Law & Order: SVU co-star Kelli Giddish (Amanda Rollins), in the role of the vindictive wife who kills her cheating husband and buries him. The album contains a cover of "Raining Blood" from Slayer; the title was changed to "Raining in Blood" for publishing reasons.

== Critical reception ==
Professional ratings
Aggregate scores
Source	Rating
Metacritic	64/100
Review scores
Source	Rating
AllMusic	3.5/5 stars
The A.V. Club	C−
Blabbermouth.net	8/10
Classic Rock	4/5 stars
Exclaim!	9/10
Pitchfork	5.7/10
Punknews.org	3/5 stars
Record Collector	3/5 stars
Terrorizer	7/10
Vice (Expert Witness)	A−

According to the review aggregator Metacritic, Bloodlust received "generally favorable reviews" based on a weighted average score of 64 out of 100 from 8 critic scores.

== Track listing ==
No.	Title	Writer(s)	Length
1.	"Civil War" (featuring Dave Mustaine)	Tracy Marrow; Ernest Cunningan; Vince Dennis; Dave Mustaine	4:23
2.	"The Ski Mask Way"	Marrow; Dennis; William Scott Putney	3:36
3.	"This Is Why We Ride"	Marrow; Cunningan; Dennis; Marlon David Coyle	5:26
4.	"All Love Is Lost" (featuring Max Cavalera)	Marrow; Dennis; Putney; Max Cavalera	3:36
5.	"Raining Blood / Postmortem 2017" (Slayer cover)	Jeffrey John Hanneman; Kerry Ray King	4:31
6.	"God, Please Believe Me"	Marrow; Cunningan; Putney	1:23
7.	"Walk with Me…" (featuring Randy Blythe)	Marrow; Dennis; Putney; Randy Blythe	3:07
8.	"Here I Go Again"	Marrow; Putney	3:32
9.	"No Lives Matter"	Marrow; Will Dorsey; Dennis; Putney	4:23
10.	"Bloodlust"	Marrow; Cunningan; Dennis; Putney; Monte Lee Pittman	3:34
11.	"Black Hoodie"	Marrow; Cunningan; Dennis; Putney; Juan Garcia	3:29
Total length:			41:00

2019 special edition bonus tracks
No.	Title	Length
12.	"Extreme Discipline"	2:56
13.	"Blood Sport"	3:23
14.	"Civil War" (instrumental)	4:23
15.	"No Lives Matter" (instrumental)	3:45
16.	"Cop Killer" (live at Hellfest 2018)	6:05
Total length:		61:40

instrumental version 2023
No.	Title	Length
1.	"Civil War" (instrumental)	4:23
2.	"The Ski Mask Way" (instrumental)	3:30
3.	"This Is Why We Ride" (instrumental)	5:26
4.	"All Love Is Lost" (instrumental)	3:36
5.	"Raining Blood / Postmortem 2017" (instrumental)	3:40
6.	"God, Please Believe Me" (instrumental)	1:23
7.	"Walk with Me…" (instrumental)	3:07
8.	"Here I Go Again" (instrumental)	3:32
9.	"No Lives Matter" (instrumental)	3:45
10.	"Bloodlust" (instrumental)	3:34
11.	"Black Hoodie" (instrumental)	3:29
Total length:		39:30

== Personnel ==
- Ice-T – lead vocals
- Ernie C – lead guitar
- Juan of the Dead – rhythm guitar
- Vincent Price – bass, lead vocals on "Postmortem"
- Ill Will – drums
- Sean E Sean – sampler, backing vocals
- Little Ice – hype man, backing vocals

=== Guest musicians ===
- Dave Mustaine – spoken word and lead guitar on "Civil War"
- Jason C. Miller – additional backing vocals on "The Ski Mask Way" and "No Lives Matter"
- Max Cavalera – guest vocals on "All Love Is Lost"
- Randy Blythe – guest vocals on "Walk with Me…"
- Jackie Kajzer – additional backing vocals on "No Lives Matter"

== Accolades ==
Year	Publication	Country	Accolade	Rank
2017	Loudwire	United States	"25 Best Metal Albums of 2017"	11
2017	Rolling Stone	United States	"20 Best Metal Albums of 2017"	16
2017	AXS	United States	"10 Best Metal Albums of 2017"	3

== Charts ==
Chart (2017)	Peak position
Australian Albums (ARIA)	12
Austrian Albums (Ö3 Austria)	24
Belgian Albums (Ultratop Flanders)	24
Belgian Albums (Ultratop Wallonia)	47
Dutch Albums (Album Top 100)	89
Finnish Albums (Suomen virallinen lista)	33
French Albums (SNEP)	85
German Albums (Offizielle Top 100)	13
New Zealand Heatseeker Albums (RMNZ)	1
Scottish Albums (Official Charts)	83
Swiss Albums (Schweizer Hitparade)	18
UK Rock & Metal Albums (Official Charts)	3
US Billboard 200	157
