= Body Count (album) =

1992 studio album by Body Count

Studio album by Body Count
- Released: March 31, 1992
- Recorded: September–December 1991
- Studios: One-on-One Recorders, Syndicate Studio West (North Hollywood, California)
- Genres: Crossover thrash; rap metal
- Length: 52:59
- Labels: Sire; Warner Bros.
- Producers: Ice-T; Ernie C

Body Count chronology
Body Count (1992)	Born Dead (1994)

Singles from Body Count
- 1. "There Goes the Neighborhood" Released: March 1992; 2. "Cop Killer" Released: 1992

Body Count is the debut studio album by American heavy metal band Body Count. It was released on March 31, 1992, through Sire Records. The album's material focuses on various social and political issues ranging from police brutality to drug abuse. It also presents a turning point in the career of Ice-T, who co-wrote the album's songs with lead guitarist Ernie C and performed as the band's lead singer. Previously known only as a rapper, Ice-T's work with the band helped establish a crossover audience with rock music fans. The album produced the single "There Goes the Neighborhood".

Body Count is well known for the inclusion of the controversial song "Cop Killer", which was the subject of much criticism from various political figures, although many defended the song on the basis of the group's right to freedom of speech. Ice-T eventually chose to remove the song from the album, although it continues to be performed live. It was voted the 31st best album of the year in The Village Voice's Pazz & Jop critics poll, and is believed to have helped pave the way for the mainstream success of the rap metal genre. In 2023, Body Count was added to the Bloomsbury Publishing 33 1/3 series.

== Conception ==
Body Count, as pictured in the album's liner notes

While Ice-T was primarily known for his work in the hip-hop genre, he had long been a fan of rock music and formed Body Count out of this interest. The band's first lineup was composed entirely of musicians he had known from Crenshaw High School. Ice-T states that "I knew we didn't want to form an R&B group. [...] Where am I gonna get the rage and the anger to attack something with that? [...] We knew Body Count had to be a rock band. The name alone negates the band from being R&B."

Ice-T co-wrote the band's music and lyrics with lead guitarist Ernie C, and took on the duties of lead vocalist. Ice-T states that "I knew I couldn't sing, but then I thought, 'Who can sing in rock 'n' roll?'" Aside from Ice-T and Ernie C, the original line-up consisted of Mooseman on bass, Beatmaster V on drums and D-Roc on rhythm guitar. According to Ice-T, "We named the group Body Count because every Sunday night in L.A., I'd watch the news, and the newscasters would tally up the youths killed in gang homicides that week and then just segue to sports. 'Is that all I am,' I thought, 'a body count?'"

Ice-T introduced the band at Lollapalooza in 1991, devoting half of his set to his hip hop songs, and half to Body Count songs, increasing his appeal with both alternative rock fans and middle-class teenagers. Many considered the Body Count performances to be the highlight of the tour. The group made its first album appearance on Ice-T's 1991 solo album O.G. Original Gangster. The song "Body Count" was preceded by a staged interview in which the performer referred to the group as a "black hardcore band", stating that "as far as I'm concerned, music is music. I don't look at it as rock, R & B, or all that kind of stuff. I just look at it as music. [...] I do what I like and I happen to like rock 'n' roll, and I feel sorry for anybody who only listens to one form of music."

Recording sessions for the group's self-titled debut took place from September to December 1991. Ice-T states that Body Count was intentionally different from his solo hip hop albums in that "An Ice T album has intelligence, and at times it has ignorance. Sometimes it has anger, sometimes it has questions. But Body Count was intended to reflect straight anger. It was supposed to be the voice of the angry brother, without answers. [...] If you took a kid and you put him in jail with a microphone and asked him how he feels, you'd get Body Count: 'Fuck that. Fuck school. Fuck the police.' You wouldn't get intelligence or compassion. You'd get raw anger." From the album, "There Goes the Neighborhood" was released as a single.

== Music and lyrics ==
Ernie C and Ice-T conceived the album with the dark, ominous tone and Satanic lyrical themes of Black Sabbath in mind. However, Ice-T felt that basing his lyrics in reality would be scarier than the fantasy basis in Black Sabbath's lyrics; the inner artwork depicts a man with a gun pointed at the viewer's face. Ice-T states, "To us that was the devil [...] what's more scary than [...] some gangster with a gun pointed at you?" Ice-T defined the resulting mix of heavy metal and reality-based lyrics as "a rock album with a rap mentality". Jon Pareles of The New York Times wrote that with Body Count, Ice-T "has recognized a kinship between his gangster raps and post-punk, hard-core rock, both of which break taboos to titillate fans. But where rap's core audience is presumably in the inner city, hard-core appeals mostly to suburbanites seeking more gritty thrills than they can get from Nintendo or the local mall."

Despite Ice-T's attempts to differentiate Body Count from his work in the hip hop genre, the press focused on the group's rap image. Ice-T felt that politicians had intentionally referred to the song "Cop Killer" as rap to provoke negative criticism. "There is absolutely no way to listen to the song 'Cop Killer' and call it a rap record. It's so far from rap. But, politically, they know by saying the word rap they can get a lot of people who think, 'Rap-black-rap-black-ghetto,' and don't like it. You say the word rock, people say, 'Oh, but I like Jefferson Airplane, I like Fleetwood Mac — that's rock.' They don't want to use the word rock & roll to describe this song." Body Count has since been credited for pioneering the rap metal genre popularized by groups such as Rage Against the Machine and Limp Bizkit. Ernie C stated that "A lot of rappers want to be in a rock band, but it has to be done sincerely. You can't just get anybody on guitar and expect it to work. [...] [We] really loved the music we were doing, and it showed."

=== Lyrical themes ===
The final image of the "There Goes the Neighborhood" music video

Like Ice-T's gangsta rap albums, Body Count's material focused on various social and political issues, with songs focusing on topics ranging from police brutality to drug abuse. According to Ernie C, "Everybody writes about whatever they learned growing up, and we were no exception. Like The Beach Boys sing about the beach, we sing about the way we grew up." Ice-T states that "Body Count was an angry record. It was meant to be a protest record. I put my anger in it, while lacing it with dark humor." The spoken introduction, "Smoked Pork" features Ice-T taking on the roles of a gangster pretending to be seemingly stranded motorist and a police officer who refuses to aid. The track begins with Mooseman and Ice-T driving their car towards a police car, and then Ice-T asks for the gun Mooseman has and tells Mooseman to stay in the car, much to Mooseman's chagrin, as Mooseman wanted to kill the cop in this round. Ice-T then walks up to the policeman, pretending to be a stranded motorist, asking for help, but the policeman refuses, saying: "Nah, that's not my job! My job's not to help your fuckin' ass out!", then telling him that "my job is eatin' these doughnuts". When the officer recognizes Ice-T, gunshots are heard. The final voice on the track is Ice-T confirming his identity.

In the lyrics of "KKK Bitch", Ice-T describes a sexual encounter with a woman who he soon learns is the daughter of the Grand Wizard of the Ku Klux Klan. The lyrics go on to describe a scenario in which members of Body Count "crash" a Klan meeting to "get buck wild with the white freaks". Ice-T makes humorous reference to "[falling] in love with Tipper Gore's two 12-year-old nieces", and ponders the possibility of the Grand Wizard coming after him "when his grandson's named little Ice-T." In The Ice Opinion: Who Gives a Fuck?, Ice-T wrote that "'KKK Bitch' was ironic because the sentiments were true. We'd play Ku Klux Klan areas in the South and the girls would always come backstage and tell us how their brothers and fathers didn't like black folks. [...] We knew that 'KKK Bitch' would totally piss off the Ku Klux Klan. There's humor in the song, but it fucks with them. It's on a punk tip."

"Voodoo" describes a fictional encounter between Ice-T and an old woman with a voodoo doll. "The Winner Loses" describes the downfall of a crack cocaine user. "There Goes the Neighborhood" is a sarcastic response to critics of Body Count, sung from the point of view of a racist white rocker who wonders "Don't they know rock's just for whites? / Don't they know the rules? / Those niggers are too hardcore / This shit ain't cool." For the song's music video, the word "nigger" was replaced with the phrase "black boys". The music video ends with a black musician implanting an electric guitar into the ground and setting it on fire. The final image is similar to that of a burning cross.

"Evil Dick" focuses on male promiscuity. Its lyrics describe a married man who is led to seek strange women after his "evil dick" tells him "Don't sleep alone, don't sleep alone." "Momma's Gotta Die Tonight" follows the account of a black teenager who murders and dismembers his racist mother after she reacts negatively when he brings a white girl home. In The Ice Opinion: Who Gives a Fuck?, Ice-T wrote that the song's lyrics are metaphorical, explaining that "Whoever is still perpetuating racism has got to die, not necessarily physically, but they have to kill off that part of their brain. From now on, consider it dead. The entire attitude is dead."

Ice-T referred to the album's final track, "Cop Killer" as a protest song, stating that the song is "[sung] in the first person as a character who is fed up with police brutality." The song was written in 1990, and had been performed live several times, including at Lollapalooza, before it had been recorded in a studio. The album version mentions then-Los Angeles police chief Daryl Gates and the black motorist Rodney King, whose beating by LAPD officers was recorded on videotape. In The Ice Opinion: Who Gives a Fuck?, Ice-T wrote that the song "[is] a warning, not a threat—to authority that says, 'Yo, police: We're human beings. Treat us accordingly.'" In an interview for Rolling Stone, Ice-T stated that "We just celebrated the fourth of July, which is really just national Fuck the Police Day [...] I bet that during the Revolutionary War, there were songs similar to mine."

== Release and reception ==
Professional ratings
Review scores
Source	Rating
AllMusic	3/5 stars
Chicago Tribune	3/4 stars
Entertainment Weekly	A−
Kerrang!	4/5
Rolling Stone	3/5 stars
The Rolling Stone Album Guide	2/5 stars
Spin Alternative Record Guide	9/10
The Village Voice	A−

The album was released on March 31, 1992, on CD, vinyl, and audio cassette. Initial copies of the album were shipped out in black body bags, a promotional device that drew minor criticism. The album debuted at No. 32 on Billboard's Top 50 albums, peaking at No. 26 on the Billboard 200. By January 29, 1993, the album sold 480,000 copies, according to Variety. However, according to the Recording Industry Association of America, Body Count was certified gold for sale shipments in excess of 500,000 copies, with a certification date back to August 4, 1992.

In a positive review for The Village Voice, music critic Robert Christgau said Ice-T "takes rap's art-ain't-life defense over the top" on a heavy metal album which utilizes and parodies "the style's whiteskin privilege". He wrote that the music is "flat-out hard rock, short on soloistic intricacy and fancy structures", but that it is set apart from other metal by Ice-T, who "describes racism in language metalheads can understand, kills several policemen, and cuts his mama into little pieces because she tells him to hate white people. This can be a very funny record." Greg Kot, writing in the Chicago Tribune, felt the lyrics on some songs are pathologically flawed and off-putting, but the band's take on metal styles is impressive and, "on the stereotype-bashing 'There Goes the Neighborhood,' the humor, message and music coalesce brilliantly". Don Kaye of Kerrang! called Body Count a "noisy, relentless musical attack".

In a less enthusiastic review for Rolling Stone, J. D. Considine wrote that "messages" are less important here than "the sort of sonic intensity parental groups fear even more than four-letter words," while AllMusic's Stephen Thomas Erlewine called the album "a surprisingly tepid affair" partly because "all of Ice-T's half-sung/half-shouted lyrics fall far short of the standard he established on his hip-hop albums." In the Pazz & Jop, an annual poll of prominent critics published by The Village Voice, Body Count was voted the 31st best album of 1992. Christgau, the poll's supervisor, ranked it 22nd on his own year-end list.

In 2017, Rolling Stone listed the album at No. 90 on its list of the 100 Greatest Metal Albums of All Time.

== Controversy ==
The album was originally set to be distributed under the title Cop Killer, named for the song, which criticizes violent police officers. During the production of the album, Warner Bros. executives were aware of the potential controversy that the album and song could cause, but supported it. At a Time Warner shareholders' meeting, actor Charlton Heston stood and read lyrics from the song "KKK Bitch" to an astonished audience and demanded that the company take action. Sire responded by changing the title to Body Count, but did not remove the song. In an article for The Washington Post'', Tipper Gore condemned Ice-T for songs like "Cop Killer", writing that "Cultural economics were a poor excuse for the South's continuation of slavery. Ice-T's financial success cannot excuse the vileness of his message [...] Hitler's anti-Semitism sold in Nazi Germany. That didn't make it right." The Dallas Police Association and the Combined Law Enforcement Association of Texas launched a campaign to force Warner Bros. Records to withdraw the album. CLEAT called for a boycott of all products by Time-Warner in order to secure the removal of the song and album from stores. Within a week, they were joined by police organizations across the United States. Ice-T asserted that the song was written from the point of view of a fictional character, and told reporters that "I ain't never killed no cop. I felt like it a lot of times. But I never did it. If you believe that I'm a cop killer, you believe David Bowie is an astronaut," in reference to Bowie's song "Space Oddity".

"Cop Killer" (sample)

The National Black Police Association opposed the boycott of Time Warner and the attacks on "Cop Killer", identifying police brutality as the cause of much anti-police sentiment and proposed the creation of independent civilian review boards "to scrutinize the actions of our law enforcement officers" as a way of ending the provocations that caused artists such as Body Count "to respond to actions of police brutality and abuse through their music. [...] Many individuals of the law enforcement profession do not want anyone to scrutinize their actions, but want to scrutinize the actions of others." Critics argued that the song could cause crime and violence. Others defended the album on the basis of the group's right to freedom of speech, and cited the fact that Ice-T had portrayed a police officer in the film New Jack City. Ice-T is quoted as saying that "I didn't need people to come in and really back me on the First Amendment. I needed people to come in and say 'Ice-T has grounds to make this record.' I have the right to make it because the cops are killing my people. So fuck the First Amendment, let's deal with the fact that I have the right to make it."

Over the next month, controversy against the band grew. Vice President Dan Quayle branded "Cop Killer" as being "obscene", and President George H. W. Bush publicly denounced any record company that would release such a product. Body Count was removed from the shelves of a retail store in Greensboro, North Carolina after local police had told the management that they would no longer respond to any emergency calls at the store if they continued to sell the album. In July 1992, the New Zealand Police Commissioner unsuccessfully attempted to prevent an Ice-T concert in Auckland, arguing that "Anyone who comes to this country preaching in obscene terms the killing of police, should not be welcome here," before taking Body Count and Warner Bros. Records to the Indecent Publications Tribunal, in an effort to get it banned under New Zealand's Indecent Publications Act. This was the first time in 20 years that a sound recording had come before the censorship body, and the first ever case involving popular music. After reviewing the various submissions, and listening carefully to the album, the Tribunal found the song "Cop Killer" to be "not exhortatory", saw the album as displaying "an honest purpose", and found Body Count not indecent. The controversy escalated to the point where death threats were sent to Time Warner executives, and stockholders threatened to pull out of the company. Finally, Ice-T decided to remove "Cop Killer" from the album of his own volition, a decision which was met by criticism from other artists who derided Ice-T for "caving in to external pressure". In an interview, Ice-T stated that "I didn't want my band to get pigeon-holed as that's the only reason that record sold. It just got outta hand and I was just tired of hearing it. I said, 'fuck it,' I mean they're saying we did it for money, and we didn't. I'd gave the record away, ya know, let's move on, let's get back to real issues, not a record, but the cops that are out there killing people."

"Cop Killer" was replaced by a new version of "Freedom of Speech", a song from Ice-T's 1989 solo album The Iceberg/Freedom of Speech...Just Watch What You Say. Alongside the album's reissue, Warner Bros. issued "Cop Killer" as a single. Ice-T left Warner Bros. Records the following year because of disputes over his solo album Home Invasion, taking Body Count with him. The studio version of "Cop Killer" has not been re-released, although a live version of the song appears on Body Count's 2005 release Live in L.A. According to Ernie C, the controversy over the song "still lingers for us, even now. I'll try to book clubs and the guy I'm talking to will mention it and I'll think to myself 'Man, that was 17 years ago.' But I meet a lot of bands who ask me about it, too, and I'm real respected by other artists for it. But it's a love/hate thing. Ice gets it too, even though he plays a cop on TV now on Law & Order SVU."

== Track listing ==
26878 (original version)
No.	Title	Lyrics	Music	Length
1.	"Smoked Pork"	Ice-T		0:46
2.	"Body Count's in the House"	Ice-T	Ernie C	3:24
3.	"Now Sports"	Ice-T		0:04
4.	"Body Count"	Ice-T	Ernie C	5:17
5.	"A Statistic"	Ice-T		0:06
6.	"Bowels of the Devil"	Ice-T	Ernie C	3:43
7.	"The Real Problem"	Ice-T		0:11
8.	"KKK Bitch"	Ice-T	Ernie C	2:52
9.	"C Note"		Ernie C	1:35
10.	"Voodoo"	Ice-T	Ernie C	5:00
11.	"The Winner Loses"	Ernie C	Ernie C	6:32
12.	"There Goes the Neighborhood"	Ice-T	Ernie C	5:50
13.	"Oprah"	Ice-T		0:06
14.	"Evil Dick"	Ice-T	Ernie C	3:58
15.	"Body Count Anthem"	Ice-T	Ernie C	2:46
16.	"Momma's Gotta Die Tonight"	Ice-T	Ernie C	6:10
17.	"Out in the Parking Lot"	Ice-T		0:30
18.	"Cop Killer"	Ice-T	Ernie C	4:09
Total length:				52:59

45139 (reissue)
No.	Title	Lyrics	Music	Length
17.	"Ice-T/Freedom of Speech"	Ice-T, Jello Biafra	Jimi Hendrix	4:41
Total length:				53:03

== Personnel ==
- Ice-T – lead vocals
- Ernie C – lead guitar, acoustic guitar
- D-Roc the Executioner – rhythm guitar
- Beatmaster V – drums
- Mooseman – bass
- Sean E Sean – sampler, backing vocals
- Sean E. Mac – hype man, backing vocals

=== Guest musician ===
- Jello Biafra – spoken word on "Freedom of Speech"

== Charts ==
Chart (1992)	Peak position
US Billboard 200	26

== Certifications ==
Region	Certification	Certified units/sales
Germany (BVMI)	Gold	250,000^{^}
United States (RIAA)	Gold	500,000^{^}
^{^} Shipments figures based on certification alone.
