= Merciless (Body Count album) =

Studio album by Body Count
- Released: November 22, 2024
- Recorded: February 21, 2022 – May 1, 2023
- Studio: Graphic Nature Audio; Back House; West Alley; Wright Way
- Genre: Rap metal; thrash metal; groove metal; horrorcore
- Length: 41:22
- Label: Century Media
- Producer: Ice-T; Vincent Price; Will Putney

Body Count chronology
Carnivore (2020)	Merciless (2024)

Singles from Merciless
- 1. "Psychopath" Released: May 17, 2024; 2. "Fuck What You Heard" Released: July 19, 2024; 3. "Comfortably Numb" Released: September 20, 2024; 4. "Merciless" Released: November 21, 2024

Professional ratings
Review scores
Source	Rating
The Arts Desk	2/5 stars
Blabbermouth.net	8/10
Distorted Sound	7/10
Kerrang!	3/5
laut.de	2/5 stars
Louder Than War	4/5 stars
Metal Epidemic	4.5/5 stars
Metal Hammer	4/5 stars
RockHard	8/10

Merciless is the eighth studio album by American heavy metal band Body Count. It was released on November 22, 2024, via Century Media Records. Production was handled by Ice-T, Vincent Price and Will Putney. It features guest appearances from Corpsegrinder, Howard Jones, Joe Bad, and Max Cavalera.

== Background ==
The album is based on vocalist Ice-T's love of horror movies, a theme he decided on while in New Jersey during the COVID-19 pandemic:

"I was watching horror movies, serial killers, all this s—. So before you know it, there’s a song called ‘The Purge.’ There’s a song called ‘Psychopath.’ I’m looking at this new election coming. I’m like, ‘these motherf—s are gangbanging.’ All these different topics are coming to my head, and we make the next record."

== Track listing ==
All tracks are written by Tracy Marrow, Vincent Dennis, Will Dorsey and Will Putney except where stated.

Merciless track listing
No.	Title	Writer(s)	Length
1.	"Interrogation Interlude"		1:31
2.	"Merciless"		3:18
3.	"The Purge" (featuring Corpsegrinder)		3:46
4.	"Psychopath" (featuring Joe Bad)		3:19
5.	"Fuck What You Heard"		3:17
6.	"Live Forever" (featuring Howard Jones)		3:11
7.	"Do or Die"		3:19
8.	"Comfortably Numb"	David Gilmour, Roger Waters, Marrow	6:17
9.	"Lying Motherfucka"		3:29
10.	"Drug Lords" (featuring Max Cavalera)		2:43
11.	"World War"		3:17
12.	"Mic Contract"		3:48
Total length:			41:22

Deluxe edition (disc 1)
No.	Title	Length
1.	"Interrogation Interlude" (instrumental)	1:31
2.	"Merciless" (instrumental)	3:18
3.	"The Purge" (instrumental)	3:46
4.	"Psychopath" (instrumental)	3:19
5.	"Fuck What You Heard" (instrumental)	3:17
6.	"Live Forever" (instrumental)	3:11
7.	"Do or Die" (instrumental)	3:19
8.	"Comfortably Numb" (instrumental)	6:17
9.	"Lying Motherfucka" (instrumental)	3:29
10.	"Drug Lords" (instrumental)	2:43
11.	"World War" (instrumental)	3:17
12.	"Mic Contract" (instrumental)	3:48
Total length:		41:22

== Personnel ==
Body Count

- Ice-T – lead vocals
- Ernie C – lead guitar
- Juan of the Dead – rhythm guitar
- Vincent Price – bass, backing vocals, keyboards
- Will "Ill Will" Dorsey Jr. – drums
- Sean E Sean – backing vocals, sampler
- Tracy "Little Ice" Marrow Jr. – backing vocals

Additional musicians

- George "Corpsegrinder" Fisher – additional vocals (track 3)
- Joe Bad – additional vocals (track 4)
- Howard Jones – additional vocals (track 6)
- Max Cavalera – voice (track 10)
- Will Putney – additional guitar (tracks 1–7, 9–12)
- David Gilmour – additional guitar solo (track 8)

Production

- Ice-T – production
- Vincent Price – production
- Will Putney – production, engineering, mixing, mastering
- Erik Motta – cover photo
- Tamara Llenas Navarro – live photos
- Alex Solca – back cover photo
- Carsten Drescher – layout

== Charts ==
Chart performance for Merciless
Chart (2024–2025)	Peak position
Austrian Albums (Ö3 Austria)	22
Belgian Albums (Ultratop Flanders)	122
Croatian International Albums (HDU)	25
German Albums (Offizielle Top 100)	12
Hungarian Physical Albums (MAHASZ)	28
UK Rock & Metal Albums (Official Charts)	27
