= Carnivore (Body Count album) =

Studio album by Body Count
- Released: March 6, 2020
- Recorded: 2019
- Genres: Rap metal; thrash metal; hardcore punk
- Length: 35:55
- Label: Century Media
- Producer: Will Putney

Body Count chronology
Bloodlust (2017)	Carnivore (2020)	Merciless (2024)

Singles from Carnivore
- 1. "Carnivore" Released: December 13, 2019; 2. "Bum-Rush" Released: February 21, 2020

Carnivore is the seventh studio album by American heavy metal band Body Count, released on March 6, 2020, by Century Media. The singles "Carnivore" and "Bum-Rush" were released to promote the album.

== Background ==
Explaining the title, vocalist Ice-T reported to Loudwire in 2018, prior to the album's recording:

"It's basically: 'Fuck vegans.' We figure, anything carnivorous pretty much kicks ass. We're carnivorous! I'm not [really] saying 'Fuck vegans.' Everyone's so pussy right now, [so] we're carnivores."

The album art was created by Zbigniew M. Bielak. It is the first album to not feature any songwriting credits for Ernie C.

== Reception ==
=== Critical reception ===
Professional ratings
Aggregate scores
Source	Rating
Metacritic	67/100
Review scores
Source	Rating
Angry Metal Guy	3/5
Consequence of Sound	B
Exclaim!	6/10
Kerrang!	3/5
Metal Hammer	3.5/5 stars
Metal Storm	(7.5/10)
Tom Hull	B+

According to the review aggregator Metacritic, Carnivore received "generally favorable reviews" based on a weighted average score of 67 out of 100 from 4 critic scores.

=== Accolades ===
Publications' year-end list appearances for Carnivore
Critic/Publication	List	Rank	Ref
Consequence of Sound	Top 30 Metal/Hard Rock Albums of 2020	19	
Loudwire	Top 70 Rock/Metal Albums of 2020	N/A	
Revolver	Top 25 Albums of 2020	4	

The song "Bum-Rush" was nominated for the Grammy Award for Best Metal Performance, later winning the award and making it the band's first Grammy win.

== Track listing ==
All tracks are written by Tracy Marrow, Vincent Dennis, Will Dorsey and Will Putney except where stated.

Standard edition
No.	Title	Writer(s)	Length
1.	"Carnivore"		3:12
2.	"Point the Finger" (featuring Riley Gale)	Tracy Marrow, Vincent Dennis, Will Dorsey, Riley Gale, Will Putney	2:39
3.	"Bum-Rush"		3:24
4.	"Ace of Spades" (Motörhead cover)	Eddie Clarke, Ian Kilmister, Phil Taylor	3:00
5.	"Another Level" (featuring Jamey Jasta)	Marrow, Jamey Jasta	4:12
6.	"Colors - 2020" (featuring Dave Lombardo)	Marrow, Charles Andre Glenn	4:26
7.	"No Remorse"		3:13
8.	"When I'm Gone" (featuring Amy Lee)	Marrow, Dennis, Dorsey, Amy Lee, Putney	4:36
9.	"Thee Critical Beatdown"		3:12
10.	"The Hate Is Real" (featuring Jello Biafra)		4:01
Total length:			35:55

Deluxe edition (disc 1)
No.	Title	Writer(s)	Length
11.	"6 in tha Morning - 2020" (Unreleased demo)	Marrow, Andre Pierre	3:31
12.	"No Lives Matter" (Live in Australia 2017)		4:57
13.	"Black Hoodie" (Live in Australia 2017)	Ernie Cunnigan, Juan Garcia, Marrow, Dennis, Putney	3:26
Total length:			48:40

Deluxe edition (disc 2)
No.	Title	Length
1.	"Carnivore" (instrumental)	3:12
2.	"Point the Finger" (instrumental)	2:39
3.	"Bum-Rush" (instrumental)	3:24
4.	"Another Level" (instrumental)	4:12
5.	"Colors - 2020" (instrumental)	4:26
6.	"No Remorse" (instrumental)	3:13
7.	"When I'm Gone" (instrumental)	4:12
8.	"Thee Critical Breakdown" (instrumental)	3:12
9.	"The Hate Is Real" (instrumental)	3:54
10.	"6 in tha Morning - 2020" (instrumental)	3:24
Total length:		35:49

== Personnel ==
Body Count

- Ice-T – lead vocals
- Ernie C – lead guitar
- Juan of the Dead – rhythm guitar
- Vincent Price – bass, additional voices on "The Hate Is Real"
- Ill Will – drums
- Sean E Sean – sampler, backing vocals
- Little Ice – hype man, backing vocals

Other personnel

- Will Putney – production, mixing, mastering, additional guitar
- Riley Gale – vocals on "Point the Finger"
- Jamey Jasta – vocals on "Another Level"
- Amy Lee – vocals on "When I'm Gone"
- Jello Biafra – additional voices on "The Hate Is Real"
- Jorge Hinojosa – additional voices on "The Hate Is Real"
- Hue X – additional voices on "The Hate Is Real"
- Trina Scelsi – additional voices on "The Hate Is Real"
- Emotional Xan – additional lyrics on "Point the Finger"
- Dave Lombardo – additional drums on "Colors"
- Josean Orta – additional drums on "Ace of Spades"
- Zbigniew Bielak – artwork
- Nishad George – guitar solos on "Colors - 2020"

== Charts ==
Sales chart performance for Carnivore
Chart (2020)	Peak position
Australian Albums (ARIA)	27
Austrian Albums (Ö3 Austria)	8
Belgian Albums (Ultratop Flanders)	39
Belgian Albums (Ultratop Wallonia)	34
Finnish Albums (Suomen virallinen lista)	39
French Albums (SNEP)	55
German Albums (Offizielle Top 100)	5
Hungarian Albums (MAHASZ)	29
Scottish Albums (Official Charts)	53
Spanish Albums (PROMUSICAE)	96
Swiss Albums (Schweizer Hitparade)	10
US Independent Albums (Billboard)	46
US Top Album Sales (Billboard)	28
US Top Hard Rock Albums (Billboard)	24
