= Cop Killer (song) =

Single by Body Count

from the album Body Count
- Released: 1992
- Recorded: 1991
- Genre: Crossover thrash; rap rock
- Length: 4:08
- Label: Sire; Warner Bros.
- Composer: Ernie C
- Lyricist: Ice-T
- Producers: Ice-T; Ernie C

Body Count singles chronology
"There Goes the Neighborhood" (1992)	"Cop Killer" (1992)	"Hey Joe" (1993)

Audio sample
- file; help

"Cop Killer" is a song by American heavy metal band Body Count. Released on the group's 1992 self-titled debut album. The song's lyrics about "cop killing" were criticized by President of the United States George H. W. Bush and Vice President Dan Quayle. Body Count's lead singer Ice-T has called "Cop Killer" a "protest record". He eventually recalled the album and rereleased it without the song.

== Background ==
Ice-T, who wrote the song's lyrics, referred to "Cop Killer" as a "protest record", stating that the song is sung "in the first person as a character who is fed up with police brutality". He has credited the Talking Heads song "Psycho Killer" as an inspiration for the song. "Cop Killer" was written in 1990 and had been performed live several times, including at the 1991 Lollapalooza tour, before it was recorded in a studio.

The recorded version mentions Los Angeles police chief Daryl Gates and Rodney King, a black motorist whose beating by Los Angeles Police Department officers had been caught on videotape. Shortly after the release of the Body Count album, a jury acquitted the officers and riots erupted in South Central Los Angeles. Soon after the riots, the Dallas Police Association and the Combined Law Enforcement Association of Texas launched a campaign to force Warner Bros. Records to withdraw the album.

== Reaction ==
Following its release, the song was met with opposition, with critics ranging from President George H. W. Bush to various law enforcement agencies, with demands for the song's withdrawal from commercial availability, citing concerns of promoting anti-police sentiment. Ice-T defended the song's lyrics, as did other proponents who did not believe that the song posed any risk and supported its release and sale.

=== Criticism and controversy ===
The Combined Law Enforcement Associations of Texas called for a boycott of all Time Warner products in order to secure the removal of the song and album from stores. Within a week, they were joined by police organizations across the nation. Senators Daniel Patrick Moynihan, Lloyd Bentsen and Al D'Amato protested the release of the song by canceling their planned cameo appearances in the 1993 Warner Bros. Pictures political film Dave.

Some critics argued that the song could cause crime and violence. Dennis R. Martin, the former president of the National Association of Chiefs of Police, argued:

The misuse of the First Amendment is graphically illustrated in Time Warner's attempt to insert into the mainstream culture the vile and dangerous lyrics of the Ice-T song entitled "Cop Killer". The Body Count album containing "Cop Killer" was shipped throughout the United States in miniature body bags. Only days before distribution of the album was voluntarily suspended, Time Warner flooded the record market with a half million copies. The "Cop Killer" song has been implicated in at least two shooting incidents and has inflamed racial tensions in cities across the country. Those who work closely with the families and friends of slain officers volunteering for the American Police Hall of Fame and Museum are outraged by the message of "Cop Killer". It is an affront to the officers—144 in 1992 alone—who have been killed in the line of duty while the police was upholding the laws of our society and protecting all its citizens.

=== Defense of the song ===
Others defended the album and cited the fact that Ice-T had sympathetically portrayed a police officer in the 1991 film New Jack City. Many people from the music world and other fields were supportive of the song. For example, in response to Dennis Martin's criticism, Mark S. Hamm and Jeff Ferrell argued:

Ice-T is not the first artist to put a "cop killer" theme in United States popular culture. This theme has been the subject of countless cinematic and literary works, and has appeared many times before in popular music. During the Great Depression, for example, people celebrated Pretty Boy Floyd and his exploits, which included murdering law enforcement personnel. Similarly, the highly respected fiddler Tommy Jarrell wrote and sang "Policeman", which begins, "Policeman come and I didn't want to go this morning, so I shot him in the head with my 44." But perhaps the best-known case is Eric Clapton's cover version of Bob Marley and the Wailers' "I Shot the Sheriff", which reached the top of the U.S. music charts in the mid-1970s (a feat not approached by Ice-T). "I Shot the Sheriff", though, never suffered the sort of moral and political attacks that "Cop Killer" did. How do we account for this difference?

Ice-T stated of the song, "I'm singing in the first person as a character who is fed up with police brutality. I ain't never killed no cop. I felt like it a lot of times. But I never did it. If you believe that I'm a cop killer, you believe David Bowie is an astronaut."

In a July 1992 editorial in The Wall Street Journal defending his company's involvement with the song, Time Warner co-CEO Gerald M. Levin repeated this defense, writing that rather than "finding ways to silence the messenger", critics and listeners should be "heeding the anguished cry contained in his message".

The National Black Police Association opposed the boycott of Time Warner and the attacks on "Cop Killer", identifying police brutality as the cause of much anti-police sentiment, and proposed the creation of independent civilian review boards "to scrutinize the actions of our law enforcement officers" as a way of ending the provocations that caused artists such as Body Count "to respond to actions of police brutality and abuse through their music. ... Many individuals of the law enforcement profession do not want anyone to scrutinize their actions, but want to scrutinize the actions of others."

=== Further controversy and decision to withdraw song ===
Over the next month, controversy against the band grew. Vice President Quayle branded "Cop Killer" "obscene", and President Bush publicly denounced any record company that would release such a product. Body Count was removed from the shelves of a retail store in Greensboro, North Carolina after local police had told the management that they would no longer respond to any emergency calls at the store if it continued to sell the album.

In July 1992, the New Zealand police commissioner unsuccessfully attempted to prevent an Ice-T concert in Auckland, arguing that "anyone who comes to this country preaching in obscene terms the killing of police should not be welcome here", before taking Body Count and Warner Bros. Records to the Indecent Publications Tribunal in an effort to have it banned under New Zealand's Indecent Publications Act 1963. This was the first time in 20 years that a sound recording had been brought before the censorship body and the first case involving popular music. The tribunal found the song "Cop Killer" to be "not exhortatory", saw the album as displaying "an honest purpose" and found Body Count not indecent.

At the July 1992 Time Warner annual shareholders' meeting, actor Charlton Heston, who was a minor Time Warner shareholder, addressed the crowd and recited lyrics from both "Cop Killer" and another song from Body Count, "KKK Bitch", which namechecked PMRC head Tipper Gore, in an attempt to embarrass company executives into dropping the album. In his autobiography, Heston wrote that he considered "KKK Bitch" "even more disgusting" and that he had tried to persuade the National Organization for Women to join a protest against its mentions of sex with 12-year-old girls, but that the group did not show interest.

At a Beverly Hills press conference to announce a change in policy, Ice-T began by presenting almost 40 minutes of a video documentary on the civil-rights movement before he spoke. He announced the withdrawal of the song from future copies of the album. Time Warner announced that it would recall copies with "Cop Killer" included, which sparked panic buying of the album.

Death threats were sent to Warner Bros. Records executives, and some stockholders threatened to disassociate themselves from the company. According to his 1994 book The Ice Opinion: Who Gives a Fuck?, Ice-T decided to remove the song from the album of his own volition. Ice-T left the label in 1993, following additional disputes over his solo album Home Invasion. He stated: "When I started out, [Warner] never censored us. Everything we did, we had full control over. But what happened was when the cops moved on Body Count, they issued pressure on the corporate division of Warner Bros., and that made the music division, they couldn't out-fight 'em in the battle, so even when you're in a business with somebody who might not wanna censor you, economically people can put restraints on 'em and cause 'em to be afraid. I learned that lesson in there, that you're never really safe as long as you're connected to any big corporation's money."

=== Commentary on the decision ===
The Source magazine, which was central to American hip-hop at the time, dubbed the decision "the beginning of the end of rap music", viewing it as a gateway to widespread censorship of hip-hop. An editorial by Reginald Dennis cast doubt on Ice-T's statement that it was his decision to withdraw the song. The Source became more critical of Ice-T in subsequent months, writing that he had avoided an interview on the subject in October and then awarding him the "Ross Perot Award", which implied that he had withdrawn the song for business reasons. Ice-T responded by criticizing The Source in his song "It's On". In his 2011 autobiography, he wrote that Source magazine had constantly criticized him for his decision to remove the track.

Warner Bros. Records chairman Mo Ostin said in a 1994 interview with the Los Angeles Times, "[Time Warner] got so thin-skinned after the incident at the shareholders' meeting. In the end, Ice-T decided to leave because he could not allow tampering with his work. And I can't blame him, considering the climate." Expressing regret at the circumstances leading to Ice-T's departure, Ostin praised him as "a terrific artist who spoke the truth".

== Later years ==
The studio version of "Cop Killer" has not been rereleased, although a live version of the song appears on the 2005 release Body Count: Live in LA. According to Body Count guitarist Ernie C, the controversy over the song "still lingers for us, even now. I'll try to book clubs and the guy I'm talking to will mention it and I'll think to myself, 'Man, that was 17 years ago', but I meet a lot of bands who ask me about it too and I'm real respected by other artists for it. But it's a love/hate thing. Ice gets it too, even though he plays a cop on TV now on Law & Order SVU."

Ice-T replaced the lyrics to "Cop Killer" with "ICE Killer" in a July 2025 live performance in support of protests against mass deportation during the second Trump administration.

== The Radio EP ==
To promote the band, the Ice-T-founded record label Rhyme $yndicate Records released The Radio EP extended CD single for radio stations, which included "Cop Killer" as track 5. It came in a black PVC body bag style case and the songs were heavily edited with all offensive language removed. This was not an official public release or a specific promotion for "Cop Killer".

No.	Title	Length
1.	"There Goes the Neighborhood"	4:01
2.	"Voodoo"	5:01
3.	"Bowels of the Devil"	3:43
4.	"Momma's Gotta Die Tonight"	6:11
5.	"Cop Killer"	4:08
