= Beatmaster V =

American drummer (1959-1996)

- Born: Victor Ray Wilson; February 20, 1959; Los Angeles, California, U.S.
- Died: April 30, 1996 (aged 37)
- Genres: Rap metal, crossover thrash, hardcore punk, groove metal
- Occupation: Musician
- Instrument: Drums
- Years active: 1990–1996
- Formerly of: Body Count

Victor Ray Wilson (February 20, 1959 – April 30, 1996), better known as Beatmaster V, was an American musician, best known as the original drummer of metal band Body Count.

== Early life ==
Wilson grew up in South Central, Los Angeles, and attended Crenshaw High School with Ice-T and Ernie C. As a musician he participated in music wherever he could, including church music with his local church.

In his community and church, as a youth, Beatmaster V practiced drums and other instruments. He excelled in his musical ability at an early age. By the time he was 11 years old he played with the blues musician Lou Rawls, as a drummer. He continued on and took drum classes, and built more musical skill playing with various musicians like Ernie C.

== Music career ==
Along with guitarist Ernie C, vocalist Ice-T, bassist Mooseman and rhythm guitarist D-Roc, Wilson formed the heavy metal band Body Count during the recording of Ice-T's fourth hip hop album, O.G. Original Gangster. Musically, later, after their many days of rehearsing and performing, Beatmaster V and Ernie C. ended up in the same L.A. band, Body Count. The band was founded by Ice T. & the other bandmates. After initially presenting the Body Count band sounds in L.A. clubs and venues Body Count went on to perform in the original Lollapalooza), & many other events and places across America & around the world.

== Death ==
Wilson died of leukemia in 1996.

Jonathon James, a family member, played with Body Count as a backup drummer on the album Violent Demise: The Last Days in place of Wilson.
