= Ernie C =

American guitarist (born 1959)

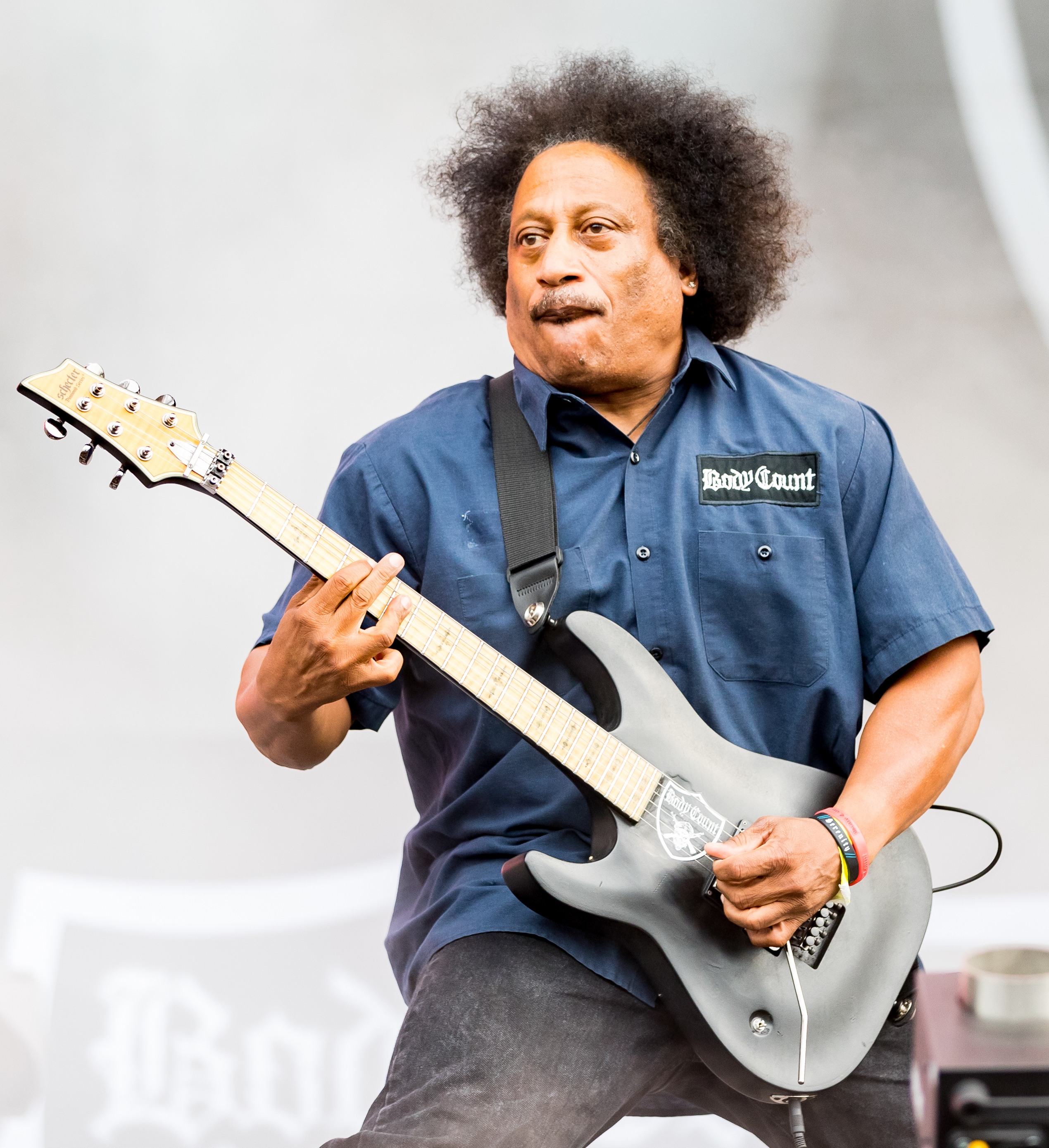
- Ernie C in 2019

Background information
- Born: Ernie Cunnigan; June 10, 1959 (age 66); Compton, California, U.S.
- Genres: Crossover thrash; rap metal; thrash metal; hardcore punk
- Occupations: Musician; record producer
- Instrument: Guitar
- Years active: 1990–present
- Member of: Body Count

Ernie Cunnigan (born June 10, 1959), better known by his stage name Ernie C, is an American musician and record producer, best known as the guitarist of rap metal band Body Count.

== Early life ==
Cunnigan grew up in Compton, California and attended Crenshaw High School with Ice-T. Cunnigan was one of the few students attending the school who was interested in rock music. His uncle was an important influence. He introduced Cunnigan to different groups and a diverse number of styles in the genre. Cunnigan became an enthusiastic fan, eventually buying a guitar from his local music store. He dedicated himself to learning, starting at 12. He was entirely self-taught.

Cunnigan's guitar playing and showmanship earned him respect among his fellow students, including members of the Crips gang. He also taught guitar to fellow students, including D-Roc the Executioner, who later joined Body Count.

== Career ==
Ernie C and Body Count bandmate Ice-T co-wrote the song "Cop Killer". Ernie C also produced demo tapes that led to the signings of Stone Temple Pilots and Rage Against the Machine, as well as the Forbidden album for Black Sabbath.

As part of Body Count, Ernie C received his first Grammy Award for Best Metal Performance nomination in 2017 at the 60th Annual Grammy Awards for the song "Black Hoodie" from the band's sixth studio album, Bloodlust. He managed to win at the 63rd Annual Grammy Awards ceremony, which was held in March 2021, when he was nominated for the second time for the song "Bum-Rush" from the group's seventh album Carnivore.

== Discography ==
- The Iceberg / Freedom of Speech... Just Watch What You Say! (1989)
- Body Count (1992)
- Born Dead (1994)
- Violent Demise: The Last Days (1997)
- Murder 4 Hire (2006)
- Manslaughter (2014)
- Bloodlust (2017)
- Carnivore (2020)
- Merciless (2024)

== Videography ==
- Murder 4 Hire (2004)
- Live in LA (2005)
- Smoke Out Festival Presents: Body Count (2005)

== Awards and nominations ==
Year	Nominee / work	Award	Result	Ref.
2017	"Black Hoodie"	Grammy Award for Best Metal Performance	Nominated	
2020	"Bum-Rush"	Grammy Award for Best Metal Performance	Won	
