= Greatest Hits: The Evidence =

Compilation album by Ice-T
- Released: August 8, 2000
- Recorded: 1986–2000
- Genre: West Coast hip hop; gangsta rap; rap rock
- Length: 1:12:06
- Label: Atomic Pop; Coroner Records; Warner Bros. Records
- Producer: Ice-T (also exec.); Afrika Islam; DJ Aladdin; Slej Tha Ruffedge; Ernie C; DJ Ace; Donald D; San Man

Professional ratings
Aggregate scores
Source	Rating
Metacritic	85/100
Review scores
Source	Rating
AllMusic	4/5 stars
Entertainment Weekly	B−
Dotmusic	4/5 stars
The New Rolling Stone Album Guide	4/5 stars
The New Zealand Herald	4/5 stars
NME	7/10
Tom Hull – on the Web	A−
The Village Voice	A

Greatest Hits: The Evidence is the first greatest hits compilation album by American recording artist Ice-T. It was released on August 8, 2000, via Atomic Pop LLC. "Money, Power, & Women" was the album's single.

== Track listing ==
US release
No.	Title	Writer(s)	Producer(s)	Length
1.	"6 'N the Mornin'"	T. Marrow; C. Glenn	Afrika Islam; Ice-T	3:43
2.	"I'm Your Pusher"	T. Marrow; C. Glenn; C. Mayfield	Afrika Islam; Ice-T	5:35
3.	"High Rollers"	T. Marrow; C. Glenn	Afrika Islam; Ice-T	4:36
4.	"You Played Yourself"	T. Marrow; C. Glenn; C. Bobbitt; F. Wesley; J. Brown	Afrika Islam; Ice-T	4:14
5.	"Peel Their Caps Back"	T. Marrow; C. Glenn	Afrika Islam; Ice-T	3:40
6.	"O.G. Original Gangster"	T. Marrow; A. Henderson	DJ Aladdin; SLEJ Da Ruff Edge; Ice-T	4:44
7.	"Colors"	T. Marrow; C. Glenn	Afrika Islam; Ice-T	4:24
8.	"New Jack Hustler"	T. Marrow; A. Henderson	DJ Aladdin; Ice-T	4:43
9.	"Power"	T. Marrow; C. Glenn	Afrika Islam; Ice-T	4:26
10.	"I Ain't New Ta This"	T. Marrow; A. Henderson	DJ Aladdin; SLEJ Da Ruff Edge; Ice-T	5:00
11.	"That's How I'm Livin'"	T. Marrow; A. Henderson	DJ Aladdin; SLEJ Da Ruff Edge; Ice-T	4:38
12.	"I Must Stand"	T. Marrow; S. Sanguillen	San-Man	3:59
13.	"Squeeze the Trigger"	T. Marrow; C. Glenn	Afrika Islam; Ice-T	5:45
14.	"The Tower"	T. Marrow	Bilal Bashir; Ice-T	3:57
15.	"The Lane" (E.V.A. Remix)	T. Marrow; R. Arsenio; S. Johns; A. Badalamenti; M. Perreault; P. Prilly	DJ Ace; SLEJ Da Ruff Edge; Ice-T	4:08
16.	"Money, Power, & Women"	T. Marrow; R. Arsenio	DJ Ace; Ice-T	4:34
Total length:				1:12:06

EU release
No.	Title	Writer(s)	Producer(s)	Length
1.	"6 'N the Mornin'"	T. Marrow; C. Glenn	Afrika Islam; Ice-T	3:43
2.	"I'm Your Pusher"	T. Marrow; C. Glenn; C. Mayfield	Afrika Islam; Ice-T	5:35
3.	"High Rollers"	T. Marrow; C. Glenn	Afrika Islam; Ice-T	4:36
4.	"You Played Yourself"	T. Marrow; C. Glenn; C. Bobbitt; F. Wesley; J. Brown	Afrika Islam; Ice-T	4:14
5.	"O.G. Original Gangster"	T. Marrow; A. Henderson	DJ Aladdin; SLEJ Da Ruff Edge; Ice-T	4:44
6.	"Colors"	T. Marrow; C. Glenn	Afrika Islam; Ice-T	4:24
7.	"New Jack Hustler (Nino's Theme)"	T. Marrow; A. Henderson	DJ Aladdin; Ice-T	4:43
8.	"Power"	T. Marrow; C. Glenn	Afrika Islam; Ice-T	4:26
9.	"I Ain't New Ta This"	T. Marrow; A. Henderson	DJ Aladdin; SLEJ Da Ruff Edge; Ice-T	5:00
10.	"That's How I'm Livin'"	T. Marrow; A. Henderson	DJ Aladdin; SLEJ Da Ruff Edge; Ice-T	4:38
11.	"I Must Stand"	T. Marrow; S. Sanguillen	San-Man	3:59
12.	"Girls L.G.B.N.A.F."	T. Marrow; C. Glenn	Afrika Islam; Ice-T	3:00
13.	"Gotta Lotta Love"	T. Marrow	Donald D; Ice-T	4:27
14.	"Body Count"	T. Marrow; E. Cunnigan	Ernie C; Ice-T	5:18
15.	"There Goes the Neighborhood"	T. Marrow; E. Cunnigan	Ernie C; Ice-T	4:01
16.	"The Lane" (E.V.A. Remix)	T. Marrow; R. Arsenio; S. Johns; A. Badalamenti; M. Perreault; P. Prilly	DJ Ace; SLEJ Da Ruff Edge; Ice-T	4:08
17.	"Money, Power, & Women"	T. Marrow; R. Arsenio	DJ Ace; Ice-T	4:34
