= Trespass (disambiguation) =

Trespass, in law, is a civil wrong to another's property, especially land.

Trespass, Trespasses or Trespassing may also refer to:

== Film and television ==
- Trespasses (film), a New Zealand film
- Trespasses (1986 film), by and featuring Adam Roarke
- Trespass (1992 film), by Walter Hill
  - Trespass (soundtrack)
  - Trespass (film score)
- Trespass (2011 film), by Joel Schumacher
- Trespassing (2004 film), an American thriller directed by James Merendino
- Trespasses (TV series), a 2025 British television miniseries
- "Trespass" (Star Wars: The Clone Wars) (TV episode)

== Literature ==
- Trespass (novel), 2010, by Rose Tremain
- Trespasses (novel), 2022 novel by Louise Kennedy

== Music ==
- Trespass (band), a British heavy metal group
- Trespass (album), 1970, by Genesis
- Trespass (EP), 2015, by Monsta X
- "Trespasses" (song), a 2004 song by Patti Smith
- Trespassing (album), 2012, by Adam Lambert
  - "Trespassing" (song), 2012

== Other uses ==
- Trespass (clothing), a British outdoor brand

== See also ==
- Trespasser (disambiguation)
- No Trespassing (disambiguation)
