= That's How I'm Livin' =

Single by Ice-T

from the album Home Invasion
- B-side: "99 Problems"
- Released: September 21, 1993 (US); December 16, 1993 (UK)
- Studio: Kytchen Sync
- Genre: Gangsta rap
- Length: 4:39 (LP Version)
- Label: Rhyme $yndicate
- Songwriter(s): Tracy Lauren Marrow; Alphonso Henderson
- Producer(s): DJ Aladdin; Slej Tha Ruffedge; Ice-T

Ice-T singles chronology
"I Ain't New Ta This" (1993)	"That's How I'm Livin'" (1993)	"Gotta Lotta Love" (1994)

"That's How I'm Livin'" is a song performed by American recording artist Ice-T. It was released as the second single from the rapper's fifth studio album Home Invasion. The song was produced by Tracy "Ice-T" Marrow, Shafiq "SLJ" Husayn and Alphonso "DJ Aladdin" Henderson, and released via Rhyme $yndicate Records on September 21, 1993 in the United States, and on December 16, 1993 in the United Kingdom. The single peaked at number 21 in the UK, and later was included in the rapper's greatest hits album Greatest Hits: The Evidence.

A music video was released for the clean version of the single. This showed a group of children watching from behind a screen as Ice-T is brought in by police. A brief clip of the book Pimp: the story of my life by Iceberg Slim is shown when the line "I was intrigued by the pimp game" is uttered.

== Track listing ==
US Version
No.	Title	Writer(s)	Producer(s)	Length
1.	"That's How I'm Livin'" (Remix Edit)	T. Marrow; A. Henderson	DJ Aladdin; Ice-T; SLEJ Da Ruff Edge	4:06
2.	"That's How I'm Livin'" (Instrumental)	T. Marrow; A. Henderson	DJ Aladdin; Ice-T; SLEJ Da Ruff Edge	4:50
3.	"That's How I'm Livin'" (A Capella)	T. Marrow; A. Henderson	DJ Aladdin; Ice-T; SLEJ Da Ruff Edge	4:26
4.	"That's How I'm Livin'" (Remix)	T. Marrow; A. Henderson	DJ Aladdin; Ice-T; SLEJ Da Ruff Edge	4:50
5.	"99 Problems" (LP Version) (featuring Brother Marquis)	T. Marrow; A. Henderson	DJ Aladdin; Ice-T; SLEJ Da Ruff Edge	4:48
6.	"99 Problems" (Instrumental)	T. Marrow; A. Henderson	DJ Aladdin; Ice-T; SLEJ Da Ruff Edge	4:48

UK Version
No.	Title	Writer(s)	Producer(s)	Length
1.	"That's How I'm Livin'" (On The Rox Remix)	T. Marrow; A. Henderson	DJ Aladdin; Ice-T; SLEJ Da Ruff Edge; Ronin Inc.	5:46
2.	"Colours"	T. Marrow; C. Glenn	Afrika Islam; Ice-T	4:28
3.	"Ricochet"	T. Marrow; A. Henderson	DJ Aladdin; Ice-T	5:04
4.	"New Jack Hustler (Nino's Theme)" (12" Mix)	T. Marrow; A. Henderson	DJ Aladdin; Ice-T; David Morales	4:50

== Personnel ==
- Tracy Lauren Marrow – vocals, lyrics, producer, arranger, re-mixing
- Alphonso Henderson – producer, arranger
- Shafiq "SLJ" Husayn – producer
- Ronin Inc. – (re-)producer
- David Morales – additional producer, re-mixing
- Tony Pizarro – engineering
- Chris Johnson – engineering
- Richard "DJ Ace" Ascencio – re-mixing
- Henry Garcia – re-mixing
- Tom Baker – mastering
- Miles Showell – mastering
- Jorge Hinojosa – management

== Chart positions ==
Chart (1993–1994)	Peak position
Australia (ARIA)	56
UK Singles (OCC)	24
