= Original gangster =

Original gangster or original gangsta (OG in short form) may refer to:

- Original Gangstas, a 1996 action film
  - Original Gangstas (soundtrack), the 1996 soundtrack to the film
- Original Gangsters (gang), a criminal gang in Sweden
- O.G. Original Gangster, a 1991 album by Ice-T
  - "O.G. Original Gangster" (song), a song on the album
- Original Gangster, a 2020 film starring Steve Guttenberg

== See also ==
- OG (disambiguation)
