= Home Invasion (album) =

Studio album by Ice-T
- Released: March 23, 1993
- Recorded: 1992
- Studios: Syndicate West (Los Angeles); Conway (Hollywood); Sound Castle (Los Angeles)
- Genres: Gangsta rap; political hip hop
- Length: 73:55
- Labels: Rhyme $yndicate; Priority
- Producers: Ice-T (also exec.); DJ Aladdin; Slej Tha Ruffedge; Hen-Gee; L.P.; Donald D; Trekan; Wolf

Ice-T chronology
O.G. Original Gangster (1991)	Home Invasion (1993)	Ice-T VI: Return of the Real (1996)

Singles from Home Invasion
- 1. "I Ain't New Ta This" Released: April 14, 1993; 2. "That's How I'm Livin'" Released: September 21, 1993; 3. "Gotta Lotta Love" Released: 1994

Home Invasion is the fifth studio album by American rapper Ice-T, released on March 23, 1993, via Rhyme $yndicate/Priority Records. It was originally set for release in 1992 as part of his deal with Sire/Warner Bros. Records, and supposed to be his first official release through his own Rhyme $yndicate record label, now in full control of the content as part of a new distribution deal with Priority Records.

== Background ==
Home Invasion was the first album that Ice-T released following the controversy over the Body Count song "Cop Killer". Sire/Warner Bros. Records had stood by freedom of expression during the controversy, although some within the Time Warner conglomerate now favored a more pragmatic policy. The album was originally set for a November 15, 1992, release, but the Rodney King riots were still fresh in people's minds, an election was in process, and politically-minded releases by 2Pac, Ice Cube and Dr. Dre were causing controversy, so Ice-T agreed to postpone Home Invasion's release, in addition to removing the song "Ricochet", which had already appeared on the soundtrack to the film of the same name.

With the album's release postponed to February 14, 1993, Sire/Warner Bros. told Ice-T that it would not release the album with its current artwork, painted by Dave Halili (cover artist for Body Count), which depicted a white boy seemingly immersed in black culture, surrounded by images of violence, mayhem and disorder. Although the catalog number 45119 was already assigned to it and the single "Gotta Lotta Love" was released, the album was still deferred. Ice-T initially agreed, opting for an all-black cover and a name change to The Black Album. He later realized that his future output would be continuously monitored and censored, so he left the label amicably, signing a distribution deal with Priority Records, which released the album with the originally intended artwork. Due to the postponed release of the album, tracks were altered to keep the topics up-to-date.

== Variants ==
Some copies of the album as originally planned for release on Sire Records have been leaked and are in circulation. These have a few differences.

- The tracks "It's On", "That's How I'm Livin'", "I Ain't New Ta This" and "Race War" are absent.
- The track Hits the Fan is called Shit Hits the Fan.
- The track "Ricochet", previously featured in the Ricochet soundtrack, is included.
- There is one more track before "Ain't A Damn Thing Changed" called "Imagine That": this is a spoof that features pro-police, pro-government and pro-tax rap.

== Reception ==
Professional ratings
Review scores
Source	Rating
AllMusic	2.5/5 stars
Robert Christgau	B+
Rolling Stone	2/5 stars
Select	2/5 medals
Spin Alternative Record Guide	7/10

The album peaked at #9 on Billboard magazine's Top R&B/Hip-Hop Albums and at #14 on the Billboard 200. Home Invasion was met with mixed reviews from music critics. Robert Christgau gave the album a B+, saying "At first it sounds as if the bad guys won—from sexy stories to O.G. kissoffs, he spends too much time proving he's still Ice Motherfucking T. But in fact he contextualizes himself as shrewdly as ever". Stephen Thomas Erlewine of AllMusic gave the album two and a half stars out of five, saying "Given the fact that most of Home Invasion was recorded during and after the "Cop Killer" media firestorm, it comes as no surprise that the album is an uneven, muddled affair, not the clean, focused attack of O.G. Original Gangster". On June 1, 1993, the album was certified gold by Recording Industry Association of America. It is Ice-T's last studio album to receive a certification from the RIAA.

== Track listing ==
No.	Title	Producer(s)	Length
1.	"Warning" (Intro)		0:36
2.	"It's On"	Ice-T; DJ Aladdin; SLEJ Da Ruff Edge	4:56
3.	"Ice M.F. T"	Ice-T; DJ Aladdin; SLEJ Da Ruff Edge	3:41
4.	"Home Invasion"	Ice-T; DJ Aladdin; SLEJ Da Ruff Edge	2:59
5.	"G-Style"	Hen-Gee; LP	4:29
6.	"Addicted To Danger"	Ice-T; DJ Aladdin; SLEJ Da Ruff Edge	3:27
7.	"Question And Answer" (Interlude)		0:33
8.	"Watch The Ice Break"	Ice-T; DJ Aladdin; SLEJ Da Ruff Edge	4:24
9.	"Race War"	Ice-T; DJ Aladdin; SLEJ Da Ruff Edge	4:50
10.	"That's How I'm Livin'"	Ice-T; DJ Aladdin; SLEJ Da Ruff Edge	4:39
11.	"I Ain't New Ta This"	Ice-T; DJ Aladdin; SLEJ Da Ruff Edge	5:01
12.	"Pimp Behind the Wheels" (featuring DJ Evil E)	Hen-Gee; LP	3:05
13.	"Gotta Lotta Love"	Ice-T; Donald D	5:24
14.	"Hit The Fan"	Ice-T; Trekan	4:47
15.	"Depths of Hell" (featuring Daddy Nitro)	Ice-T; DJ Aladdin; SLEJ Da Ruff Edge	5:15
16.	"99 Problems" (featuring Brother Marquis)	Ice-T; DJ Aladdin; SLEJ Da Ruff Edge	4:50
17.	"Funky Gripsta" (featuring Gripsta)	DJ Aladdin; Ice-T; Wolf	4:47
18.	"Message to the Soldier"	Ice-T; DJ Aladdin; SLEJ Da Ruff Edge	5:36
19.	"Ain't a Damn Thing Changed" (Outro)		0:36
Total length:			73:55

The Last Temptation of Ice bonus disc
No.	Title	Producer(s)	Length
1.	"That's How I'm Livin'" (On The Rox Remix)	Ice-T; DJ Aladdin; SLEJ Da Ruff Edge	5:43
2.	"Gotta Lotta Love" (Tubular Bells Mix)	Ice-T; Donald D	5:35
3.	"I Ain't New Ta This" (Radio Version)	Ice-T; DJ Aladdin; SLEJ Da Ruff Edge	4:15
4.	"Ricochet"	Ice-T; DJ Aladdin	5:52
5.	"Addicted To Danger" (Nut Shop Mix)	The Beatnuts	4:08
6.	"G Style" (Remix)	Hen-Gee; LP	3:50
7.	"Race War" (Full Muthafuckin' Assassin Remix)	Ice-T; DJ Aladdin; SLEJ Da Ruff Edge	4:13
Total length:			33:36

== Personnel ==
- Tracy Lauren Marrow – main artist, producer (tracks: 2–4, 6, 8–11, 13, 15–18, 20–23, 26), executive producer, design
- Eric Garcia – featured artist (track 12)
- Daddy Nitro – featured artist (track 15)
- Mark D. Ross – featured artist (track 16)
- Brandi Younger – featured artist (track 17)
- Lloyd "Mooseman" Roberts III – bass (tracks: 9, 15)
- Alphonso Henderson – producer (tracks: 2–4, 6, 8–11, 15–18, 20, 22–23, 26), mixing
- Shafiq "SLJ" Husayn – producer (tracks: 2–4, 6, 8–11, 15–16, 18, 20, 22, 26)
- Wendel Winston – producer (tracks: 5, 12, 25)
- Henry Garcia – producer (tracks: 5, 12, 25)
- Donald Lamont – producer (tracks: 13, 21)
- Trekan – producer (track 14)
- Wolf – producer (track 17)
- The Beatnuts – producers (track 24)
- Tom Baker – mastering
- Tony Pizarro – engineering & mixing
- Kev D – assistant engineering & management
- Jorge Hinojosa – management
- Mickey Benson – management
- Steve Stewart – management
- David M. Halili – album cover painting & lettering
- Dirk Walter – design supervisor
- Jesse Frohman – photography

== Charts ==
Chart (1993)	Peak position
Australian Albums (ARIA)	16
Austrian Albums (Ö3 Austria)	30
Dutch Albums (Album Top 100)	35
German Albums (Offizielle Top 100)	20
New Zealand Albums (RMNZ)	27
Swedish Albums (Sverigetopplistan)	37
Swiss Albums (Schweizer Hitparade)	24
UK Albums (Official Charts)	15
US Billboard 200	14
US Top R&B/Hip-Hop Albums (Billboard)	9

== Certifications ==
Region	Certification	Certified units/sales
United Kingdom (BPI)	Gold	100,000^{^}
United States (RIAA)	Gold	500,000^{^}
^{^} Shipments figures based on certification alone.
