= O.G. Original Gangster (song) =

Single by Ice-T

from the album O.G. Original Gangster
- B-side: "Bitches 2"; "Mind Over Matter"/"Midnight"
- Released: 1991
- Recorded: 1991
- Genre: Gangsta rap
- Length: 3:56
- Label: Sire Records
- Songwriter: Tracy Lauren Marrow
- Producers: Ice-T (also exec.); DJ Aladdin; Slej Tha Ruffedge

Ice-T singles chronology
"New Jack Hustler (Nino's Theme)" (1991)	"O.G. Original Gangster" (1991)	"I Ain't New Ta This" (1993)

"O.G. Original Gangster" is a song written and performed by American recording artist Ice-T. It was released as a single from the rapper's fourth studio album of the same name (1991). The song was produced by Tracy "Ice-T" Marrow, Shafiq "SLJ" Husayn and Alphonso "DJ Aladdin" Henderson, and released in 1991 via Sire Records. Reaching a peak position of number 7 on the US Billboard Hot Rap Songs, the single remained on the chart for a total of 11 weeks. The track also appears on the retrospective Greatest Hits: The Evidence and in the 2004 Xbox video game Def Jam: Fight for NY with Ice-T featuring in the game as himself as a playable character and in the storyline.

== Background ==
In the song, Ice-T raps about his life before he started rapping. "O.G. Original Gangster" uses samples from Melvin Bliss' "Synthetic Substitution", Thin Lizzy's "Johnny the Fox Meets Jimmy the Weed", James Brown's "Funky Drummer", Dexter Wansel's "Theme From the Planets", Curtis Mayfield's "Right on for the Darkness" and Ice-T's "6 in the Mornin'".

== Track listing ==
7", cassette
No.	Title	Writer(s)	Producer(s)	Length
1.	"O.G. Original Gangster" (Radio Version)	T. Marrow	Ice-T; DJ Aladdin; SLEJ Da Ruff Edge	3:56
2.	"Bitches 2" (Album Version)	T. Marrow	Afrika Islam; Bilal Bashir; DJ Aladdin; Ice-T; SLEJ Da Ruff Edge	5:24

12", CD
No.	Title	Writer(s)	Producer(s)	Length
1.	"O.G. Original Gangster" (Album Version)	T. Marrow	Ice-T; DJ Aladdin; SLEJ Da Ruff Edge	3:56
2.	"Mind Over Matter"	T. Marrow	Afrika Islam; Bilal Bashir; DJ Aladdin; Ice-T; SLEJ Da Ruff Edge	4:12
3.	"Midnight"	T. Marrow	Afrika Islam; Bilal Bashir; DJ Aladdin; Ice-T; SLEJ Da Ruff Edge	5:50

== Personnel ==
- Tracy Lauren Marrow – vocals, lyrics, producer, arranger, executive producer
- Alphonso Henderson – producer
- Charles Andre Glenn – producer
- Shafiq "SLJ" Husayn – producer
- Bilal Bashir – producer
- Eric Garcia – scratches
- Vachik Aghaniantz – mixing
- Dennis "Def-Pea" Parker – recording
- Tim Stedman – design
- Glen E. Friedman – photography
- Jorge Hinojosa – management

== Charts ==
Chart (1991)	Peak position
Australia (ARIA)	71
New Zealand (Recorded Music NZ)	38
UK Dance (Music Week)	41
US Hot Rap Songs (Billboard)	7
