= I'm Your Pusher =

I'm Your Pusher may refer to:

- I'm Your Pusher (Ice-T song)
- I'm Your Pusher (Scooter song)
- "I'm Your Pusher" (The Boys Presents: Diabolical episode)
