= The B-Boys =

American hip hop group

- Also known as: B Boys
- Origin: The Bronx, New York, U.S.
- Genres: Pop; electro hip hop
- Years active: 1983-1985, 2022-present
- Labels: Vintertainment; Streetwave; SpitSLAM
- Members: Donald D Brother B
- Past members: DJ Chuck Chillout

The B-Boys are an American old-school hip hop group, consisting of rappers Donald D, Brother-B, and formerly DJ Chuck Chillout. They were signed to Vincent Davis' Vintertainment label in the United States and Morgan Khan's Streetwave label in the United Kingdom. The group has released five singles from 1983 to 1985, including a 12-inch extended play Cuttin' Herbie, which debuted on 28 January 1984 at number 90 on the UK Albums Chart. A few of their songs became very sampled among other rappers and producers.

After the group was disbanded, Charles "Chuck Chillout" Turner become a successful radio DJ on 98.7 Kiss FM and has released a studio album with Jack "Kool Chip" Blakney; and Donald "Dondee" Lamont went on to Los Angeles, California joining Ice-T's Rhymes Syndicate and also released two solo studio albums.

In 2022, the group reunited sans DJ Chuck Chillout. They signed to Chuck D's record label, The SpitSLAM Record label group. They released three singles on the label - including 2024's 'We Get Down".

== Discography ==
Singles & EPs

| Year | Title | Label(s) | Chart position |
|---|---|---|---|
| 1983 | "Two, Three, Break" | Vintertainment | — |
| 1983 | "Cuttin' Herbie" | Streetwave | UK Albums Chart: #90 |
| 1983 | "Rock the House" | Break Records, Streetwave, Vintertainment, Vogue | — |
| 1985 | "Stick Up Kid / Girls" | Vintertainment, Streetwave | — |
| 1985 | "Girls - Part 2" | Vintertainment | — |
