= We're in This Together =

We're in This Together may refer to:

- We're in This Together (album) by Low Profile
- "We're in This Together" (Nine Inch Nails song), 1999
- "We're in This Together" (Simply Red song), 1996
- "We're in This Together", a song by Robin S. from her album From Now On
- "We're in This Together", a song by Catriona Gray
- "We're in This Together", a song by Justin Bieber from his EP Freedom
