= No Trespassing =

No Trespassing may refer to:

== Film ==
- No Trespassing (1922 film), starring Irene Castle
- No Trespassing (1975 film), a Romanian film
- No Trespassing, alternate title for The Red House

== Music ==
- No Trespassing (album), a 2012 album by Too Short
- No Trespassing (EP), a 1986 EP by The Roches
- "No Trespassing" (George Fox song), a 1989 song by George Fox
- "No Trespassing" (ASAP Rocky song), 2026
- "No Trespassing", a 1960 song from Walk, Don't Run (The Ventures album)

== See also ==
- Trespassing, unlawfully entering the land of another person or entity
- Trespass (disambiguation)
