= O.G. Original Gangster =

Studio album by Ice-T
- Released: May 14, 1991
- Recorded: July 1990 – January 1991
- Studios: Syndicate Studios West (Los Angeles); Widetracks (Los Angeles); Dodge City Sound (Los Angeles); Fox Run Studios (Los Angeles)
- Genre: Gangsta rap
- Length: 72:17
- Label: Sire
- Producers: Ice-T (also exec.); DJ Aladdin; Afrika Islam; Slej Tha Ruffedge; Bilal Bashir; Beatmaster V; Nat the Cat

Ice-T chronology
The Iceberg/Freedom of Speech... Just Watch What You Say! (1989)	O.G. Original Gangster (1991)	Home Invasion (1993)

Singles from O.G. Original Gangster
- 1. "O.G. Original Gangster" Released: 1991; 2. "New Jack Hustler (Nino's Theme)" Released: 1991

O.G. Original Gangster is the fourth studio album by American rapper Ice-T, released May 14, 1991, by Sire Records. Recording took place from July 1990 to January 1991 in Los Angeles. Its production was handled by seven producers: Afrika Islam, Beatmaster V, Bilal Bashir, DJ Aladdin, Nat the Cat, SLJ and Ice-T himself, who also served as executive producer. It features guest appearances from Body Count, Prince Whipper Whip and various Rhyme Syndicate artists, such as Donald D, Evil E and Randy Mac.

The album peaked at number 15 on the U.S. Billboard 200 and number 9 on the Top R&B/Hip-Hop Albums chart. On July 24, 1991, it was certified gold by the Recording Industry Association of America, indicating U.S. sales of more than 500,000 units. O.G. Original Gangster was ranked at #25 in Melody Maker's list of the top 30 albums of 1991, and was featured in The Source's 100 Best Rap Albums and the book 1001 Albums You Must Hear Before You Die. The album was praised by many as his best.

== Release ==
On the album's release, the vinyl version only contained 16 of the compact disc's 24 tracks. The NME stated to "forget the format's limitations" and promoted the compact disc version with 24 tracks over the lp.

== Critical reception ==
Professional ratings
Review scores
Source	Rating
AllMusic	5/5 stars
Chicago Sun-Times	3.5/4 stars
Chicago Tribune	3/4 stars
Christgau's Consumer Guide	A
Daily News	4/4 stars
Entertainment Weekly	A
NME	9/10
Rolling Stone	4/5 stars
The Rolling Stone Album Guide	4/5 stars
Select	2/5

From contemporary reviews, NME critic Dele Fadele praised O.G. Original Gangster as Ice-T's "best shot yet; riotous vignettes from a decaying America full of devious humour and striking pathos – all those things NWA profess to be but clearly aren't." Fadele found that the music "is always restlessly inventive in catering for your solar plexus (even on the hardcore/Heavy Metal crossover token track)" and "complements highlights like the sad, droning 'The Tower', the optimistic 'Escape from the Killing Fields' (a scathing re-write of Public Enemy's 'Black Steel in the Hour of Chaos' that explains the original metaphor) and the out-of-character bad-tempered 'Lifestyles of the Rich and Infamous'".

In a negative review for Select, Adam Higginbotham wrote that only three tracks – "Mind Over Matter", "The Tower" and "The House" – are "outstanding", while "much of the rest relies on a well-tested recipe of looped breakbeats and linear drums"; he concluded that the album "often functions better as manifesto than as music."

== Commercial performance ==
The album was certified gold on July 24, 1991, selling over 500,000 copies.

== Track listing ==
All tracks are written by Tracy Marrow, except where noted.

No.	Title	Writer(s)	Featured artist(s)	Length
1.	"Home of the Bodybag"			2:12
2.	"First Impression"			0:45
3.	"Ziplock"			1:19
4.	"Mic Contract"		Donald D	4:23
5.	"Mind Over Matter"			4:12
6.	"New Jack Hustler (Nino's Theme)"	Marrow; Alphonso Henderson^{[a]}	DJ Aladdin	4:43
7.	"Ed"			1:10
8.	"Bitches 2"	Marrow; George Clinton; George Worrell; William Collins	Charlie Jam	5:24
9.	"Straight Up Nigga"	Marrow; Charles Glenn	DJ Aladdin	3:43
10.	"O.G. Original Gangster"			4:43
11.	"The House"			0:57
12.	"Evil E - What About Sex?"		Evil E	0:45
13.	"Fly By"		Nat the Cat; Donald D	3:28
14.	"Midnight"		Randy Mac	5:48
15.	"Fried Chicken"		Prince Whipper Whip	1:00
16.	"M.V.P.s"			4:19
17.	"Lifestyles of the Rich and Infamous"		Sean E. Sean	3:51
18.	"Body Count"		Ernie C; Beatmaster V; Mooseman; D-Roc	6:07
19.	"Prepared to Die"			0:38
20.	"Escape from the Killing Fields"			2:35
21.	"Street Killer"		Special K	0:41
22.	"Pulse of the Rhyme"			4:16
23.	"The Tower"	Marrow; Bilal Bashir	Sean E. Sean; Al Patrome; Mello	3:57
24.	"Ya Shoulda Killed Me Last Year"			1:41
Total length:				72:17

=== Notes ===
- ^{^[a]} signifies a songwriter that is only listed on music streaming services.

Sample Credits

- "Bitches 2" contains a sample from "Dr. Funkenstein", written by George Clinton, George Worrell and William Collins, as performed by Parliament.
- "Midnight" contains a sample from “Black Sabbath”, written by Ozzy Osbourne, Geezer Butler, Tony Iommi and Bill Ward, and performed by Black Sabbath.

== Personnel ==
Credits adapted from the album's liner notes.

- Tracy Lauren Marrow – main artist, producer (tracks: 1–13, 16–24), executive producer, arranging
- Alphonso Henderson – featured performer (tracks: 6, 9), producer (tracks: 1, 4–6, 8–11, 14–15, 21–22), project supervisor
- Donald Lamont – featured performer (tracks: 4, 13)
- Sean E. Sean – featured performer (tracks: 17, 23)
- Victor Ray Wilson – featured performer (track 18), producer (track 7)
- Nat the Cat – featured performer (track 13), producer (track 7)
- Lloyd "Mooseman" Roberts III – featured performer (track 18)
- Ernie Cunnigan – featured performer (track 18)
- Dennis Miles – featured performer (track 18)
- Charlie Jam – featured performer (track 8)
- Randy Mac – featured performer (track 14)
- James Whipper – featured performer (track 15)
- K. Alexander – featured performer (track 21)
- Eric Garcia – scratches
- Shafiq "SLJ" Husayn – producer (tracks: 1, 4, 8–10, 14, 15, 21)
- Charles Andre Glenn – producer (tracks: 3, 13, 16, 17, 20)
- Bilal Bashir – producer (track 23)
- Vachik Aghaniantz – recording & mixing
- Dennis "Def-Pea" Parker – recording
- Steve Battman – recording
- Tim Stedman – design
- Glen E. Friedman – photography
- "King James" Cassimus – photography
- Jorge Hinojosa – management

== Charts ==
=== Weekly charts ===
Chart (1991)	Peak position
Australian Albums (ARIA Charts)	42
US Billboard 200	15
US Top R&B/Hip-Hop Albums (Billboard)	9

=== Year-end charts ===
Chart (1991)	Position
US Billboard 200	85
US Top R&B/Hip-Hop Albums (Billboard)	58

== Certifications ==
Region	Certification	Certified units/sales
Canada (Music Canada)	Gold	50,000^{^}
United Kingdom (BPI)	Silver	60,000^{^}
United States (RIAA)	Gold	500,000^{^}
^{^} Shipments figures based on certification alone.
