= Notorious (Donald D album) =

Studio album by Donald D
- Released: 1989
- Studios: Syndicate Studio West (Los Angeles, CA); Wide Tracks (Hollywood, CA)
- Genre: Hip hop
- Length: 55:20
- Label: Rhyme $yndicate/Epic/CBS
- Producers: Afrika Islam; Donald D

Donald D chronology
Notorious (1989)	Let the Horns Blow (1991)

Notorious is the debut studio album by American rapper and producer Donald D. It was released in 1989 via Ice-T's Rhyme $yndicate Records label with distribution through Epic Records and CBS Records Inc. The recording sessions took place at Syndicate Studio West and Wide Tracks Recording Studio in Los Angeles, California. The album was produced by Afrika Islam and Donald D, with executive production provided by Ice-T. Reaching a peak position of number 78 on the Top R&B/Hip-Hop Albums, the album remained on the chart for a total of 18 weeks. It spawned two singles: "F.B.I.", which peaked at number 8 on the Hot Rap Songs, and "Notorious".

== Critical reception ==
Professional ratings
Review scores
Source	Rating
AllMusic	2/5 stars
RapReviews	8.5/10

The Orange County Register opined that "Notorious completely unravels with the violently anti-woman 'Just Suck'."

== Track listing ==
No.	Title	Length
1.	"Intro"	1:59
2.	"Notorious"	4:48
3.	"F.B.I"	4:59
4.	"Who Got the Gun"	5:17
5.	"Syndicate Posse"	4:17
6.	"A Letter I'll Never Send"	4:51
7.	"Armed and Dangerous"	4:33
8.	"Car Chase"	4:20
9.	"Just Suck"	5:03
10.	"Lost in a Freestyle" (featuring Ice-T)	5:12
11.	"On Tour"	4:43
12.	"Another Night in the Bronx"	5:21
Total length:		55:20

== Personnel ==
- Donald Lamont – main artist, producer, arranger
- Tracy Lauren Marrow – featured artist (track 10), executive producer
- Charles Andre Glenn – producer, programming (tracks: 1–5, 7–9)
- Johnny Rivers – programming (tracks: 6, 11)
- DJ Chilly-D – programming (tracks: 10, 12), scratches
- Vachik Aghaniantz – mixing
- Tom Baker – mastering
- Glen E. Friedman – photography
- Tony Sellari – artwork
- Robert Joseph Pfeifer – A&R

== Charts ==
Chart (1990)	Peak position
US Top R&B/Hip-Hop Albums (Billboard)	78
