= Gotta Lotta Love =

Single by Ice-T

from the album Home Invasion
- Released: 1994
- Recorded: 1993
- Genre: Gangsta rap
- Length: 5:24 (album version)
- Label: Rhyme $yndicate
- Songwriters: Tracy Lauren Marrow; Donald Lamont
- Producers: Ice-T (also exec.); Donald D

Ice-T singles chronology
"That's How I'm Livin'" (1993)	"Gotta Lotta Love" (1994)	"Born to Raise Hell" (1994)

Music video
- "Gotta Lotta Love" on YouTube

"Gotta Lotta Love" is a song performed by American recording artist Ice-T. It was released as the third single from the rapper's fifth studio album, Home Invasion (1993). The song was produced by Tracy "Ice-T" Marrow and Donald Lamont, and released in 1994 via Rhyme $yndicate Records. The single peaked at number 24 on the UK Singles Chart.

== Critical reception ==
Andy Beevers from Music Week gave the remix four out of five and named it Pick of the Week in the category of Dance, writing, "Hot on the heels of his 'That's How I'm Livin'' hit comes this rap about the truce between the LA gangs. Once again London's Ronin Inc handle the remixing duties, rather improbably incorporating elements of Mike Oldfield's 'Tubular Bells'. Worth watching."

== Track listing ==
US Version
No.	Title	Writer(s)	Producer(s)	Length
1.	"Gotta Lotta Love" (Album Version)	T. Marrow; D. Lamont	Donald D; Ice-T	5:24
2.	"Gotta Lotta Love" (Radio Edit)	T. Marrow; D. Lamont	Donald D; Ice-T	5:57
3.	"Gotta Lotta Love" (Instrumental)	T. Marrow; D. Lamont	Donald D; Ice-T	5:31

UK Version
No.	Title	Writer(s)	Producer(s)	Length
1.	"Gotta Lotta Love" (Tubular Bells Edit)	T. Marrow; M. Oldfield	Donald D; Ice-T; Ronin Inc.	3:41
2.	"Gotta Lotta Love" (Tubular Bells Mix)	T. Marrow; M. Oldfield	Donald D; Ice-T; Ronin Inc.	5:37
3.	"Gotta Lotta Love" (L-Town Represent's B Mix)		Donald D; Ice-T; Ronin Inc.	5:36
4.	"Gotta Lotta Love" (L-Town Represent's B Dub)		Donald D; Ice-T; Ronin Inc.	5:36

== Personnel ==
- Tracy Lauren Marrow – vocals, lyrics, producer, executive producer
- Donald Lamont – producer
- Michael Gordon Oldfield – songwriter (on Tubular Bells versions)
- Ronin Inc. – (re-)producer, mixing
- Dirk Walter – design & photography
- Hills Archer Ink – artwork & design
- Jorge Hinojosa – management

== Charts ==
Chart (1994)	Peak position
Australia (ARIA)	90
UK Singles (OCC)	24
UK Dance (Music Week)	8
