= Trespasser (disambiguation) =

A trespasser is, in the law of tort, property law and criminal law, a person who commits the crime of trespassing on a property.

Trespasser or trespassers may refer to:

== Film and television ==
- The Trespasser (1929 film), a 1929 American pre-Code film
- The Trespassers, a 1976 Australian film
- The Trespasser (1947 film), a 1947 American action film
- The Trespasser, a 1981 television film adaptation of D.H. Lawrence's novel
- The Gate II: Trespassers (1990 film), Canadian horror film
- "Trespassers" (Gotham), an episode of Gotham

== Video games ==
- Trespasser (video game), a 1998 computer game made for Microsoft Windows
- Dragon Age: Inquisition – Trespasser, a 2015 downloadable content expansion for Dragon Age: Inquisition

== Music ==
- Trespassers (album), 2010 album by Kashmir
- Trespasser (album), 2026 album by Grace Potter

== Ships ==
- HMS Trespasser, British submarine

== Literature ==
- The Trespasser (Lawrence novel), 1912 novel by D.H. Lawrence
- The Trespasser (Tana French novel), 2016

== See also ==
- Trespass (disambiguation)
