= High Rollers (song) =

Single by Ice-T

from the album Power
- Released: January 20, 1989
- Recorded: 1988
- Studio: Syndicate Studios West; Entourage Studios (Hollywood, CA)
- Genre: Gangsta rap
- Length: 4:36
- Label: Sire
- Songwriter(s): Tracy Marrow; Charles Glenn
- Producer(s): Afrika Islam; Ice-T

Ice-T singles chronology
"I'm Your Pusher" (1988)	"High Rollers" (1989)	"Lethal Weapon" (1989)

Music video
- "High Rollers" on YouTube

"High Rollers" is a song by American recording artist Ice-T. It was released on January 20, 1989, through Sire Records, as the second single from the rapper's sophomore studio album Power. Recording sessions took place at Syndicate Studios West and at Entourage Studios in Hollywood, California. Written and produced by Ice-T and Afrika Islam, the single did not reached the Billboard Hot 100, however, it made it to number 76 on the Hot R&B/Hip-Hop Songs and number 9 on the Hot Rap Songs in the United States. It also peaked at number 38 in New Zealand and number 63 on the UK Singles Chart. Music video was directed by Mitchell Sinoway.

The interludes between verses are different from the version on the album. Whereas the album's version included commentary from Amazing Many Styles Kid Jaz, the single featured Ice-T making blunt comments about the pitfalls of criminal activity. The track ends with Ice-T receiving news about some kids' being shot in Crenshaw. In the video, he shakes his head after hearing this news. The version of the song included on Greatest Hits: The Evidence was the album version. The version on the single was very rare until the advent of the internet and file-sharing.

== Track listing ==
US 12" vinyl Maxi single 33 ⅓ RPM
No.	Title	Length
1.	"High Rollers" (Remix)	4:35
2.	"The Hunted Child" (Instrumental)	4:26
3.	"The Hunted Child" (A Cappella)	1:56
4.	"The Hunted Child" (Remix)	4:26
5.	"Power" (Remix)	4:25
6.	"Power" (Instrumental)	4:25

== Charts ==
Chart (1989)	Peak position
New Zealand (Recorded Music NZ)	38
UK Singles (OCC)	63
US Hot R&B/Hip-Hop Songs (Billboard)	76
US Hot Rap Songs (Billboard)	9

== Personnel ==
- Tracy "Ice-T" Marrow – vocals, producer
- Charles "Afrika Islam" Glenn – producer, programming
- Eric "DJ Evil E" Garcia – scratches
- Mark Wolfson – recording, remixing
- Fred Kelly – engineering assistant
- Glen E. Friedman – photography
- Jorge Hinojosa – management
- Darlene Ortiz – model
