= Trespass (soundtrack) =

Music From The Motion Picture "Trespass"

Soundtrack album by Various artists
- Released: November 24, 1992
- Studio: Ocean Way Studios (Hollywood, CA)
- Genre: West Coast hip hop; East Coast hip hop; hardcore hip hop; gangsta rap
- Length: 49:33
- Label: Sire; Warner Bros.
- Producer: Jorge Hinojosa (exec.); Sharon Boyle (exec.); AMG; Battlecat; Bilal Bashir; Black Sheep; Crazy Toones; DJ Aladdin; DJ Premier; Donald D; Guru; Ice-T; Jim Keltner; Lord Finesse; Ry Cooder; Sir Jinx; Sir Mix-a-lot; Slej Tha Ruffedge; The Bomb Squad; WC

Music from the Motion Picture Trespass is the original soundtrack to Walter Hill's 1992 film Trespass. It was released in 1992 via Sire Records and Warner Bros. Records. It is composed of twelve hip hop tracks from various rappers and producers. The title track was performed by two actors from the film, Ice Cube and Ice-T. The album has peaked at number 82 on the Billboard 200.

== Reception ==
Professional ratings
Review scores
Source	Rating
AllMusic	2/5 stars
Select	2/5 medals

"Tagged on at the end is a single track by Ry Cooder… a piece which suggests Cooder's main claim to gangsta cred is a readiness to take the loot and run," remarked David Sinclair in a 3/5 review in Q. "Despite some excellently menacing beats – especially the Ice-T/Daddy Nitro duet 'Depths of Hell' – the album is let down over the distance by its numbingly repetitive language and one-track theme".

== Track listing ==
No.	Title	Writer(s)	Producer(s)	Length
1.	"Trespass" (performed by Ice-T & Ice Cube)	O. Jackson; T. Marrow	Sir Jinx	2:55
2.	"Gotta Do What I Gotta Do" (performed by Public Enemy)	C. Ridenhour; G. Rinaldo; H. Boxley; K. Boxley	The Bomb Squad	4:42
3.	"Depths of Hell" (performed by Ice-T & Daddy Nitro)	A. Henderson; T. Marrow	DJ Aladdin; Ice-T; SLEJ Da Ruff Edge	5:14
4.	"I Check My Bank" (performed by Sir Mix-a-Lot)	A. Ray	Sir Mix-a-Lot	4:08
5.	"I'm a Playa (Bitch)" (performed by Penthouse Players Clique)	C. Brown; K. Gilliam; W. Milo	DJ Battlecat; Penthouse Players Clique (co.)	3:54
6.	"On the Wall" (performed by Black Sheep)	A. Titus; W. McLean	Black Sheep	5:31
7.	"Don't Be a 304" (performed by AMG)	J. Lewis	AMG; Courtney Branch (co.); Tracy Kendrick (co.)	3:34
8.	"Gotta Get Over (Taking Loot)" (performed by Gang Starr)	C. Martin; K. Elam	DJ Premier; Guru	3:43
9.	"You Know What I'm About" (performed by Lord Finesse)	R. Hall Jr.	Lord Finesse	4:12
10.	"I'm Gonna Smoke Him" (performed by Donald D)	D. Lamont; B. Bashir	Bilal Bashir; Donald D	4:24
11.	"Quick Way Out" (performed by WC and the Maad Circle)	A. Ivey Jr.; W. Calhoun Jr.	DJ Crazy Toones; DJ Battlecat; WC	3:46
12.	"King of the Street" (performed by Ry Cooder & Jim Keltner)	J. Keltner; R. Cooder	Jim Keltner; Ry Cooder	3:30
Total length:				49:33

== Personnel ==
- Lloyd "Mooseman" Roberts III – bass (track 3)
- Nathan East – bass (track 12)
- Jon Hassell – trumpet (track 12)
- Bob Morse – engineering (track 1)
- Anthony "Sir Jinx" Wheaton – mixing (track 1)
- Robert "Void" Caprio – engineering (track 2)
- Mike Bona – mixing (track 2)
- Tony Pizarro – engineering & mixing (track 3)
- Anthony Ray – engineering & mixing (track 4)
- Sean Freehill – engineering (track 5)
- Joe McGrath – mixing (track 5)
- Lisle Leete – engineering & mixing (track 6)
- Courtney Branch – engineering & mixing (track 7)
- Tracy Kendrick – engineering & mixing (track 7)
- Eddie Sancho – engineering (track 8)
- Christopher Edward Martin – mixing (track 8)
- Keith Edward Elam – mixing (track 8)
- John Quinde – engineering & mixing (track 9)
- Luc Allen – engineering & mixing (track 9)
- Mike Hightower – engineering (track 10)
- Bilal Bashir – mixing (track 10)
- Donald Lamont – mixing (track 10)
- Mike Melnick – engineering & mixing (track 11)
- Allen Sides – engineering & mixing (track 12)
- Brian Knapp Gardner – mastering
- Jorge Hinojosa – executive producer
- Sharon Boyle – executive producer
- Dirk Walter – art direction
- Katherine Delaney – design

== See also ==
- Trespass (film score)
