= The Lane =

1996 single by Ice-T

Single by Ice-T

from the album Ice-T VI: Return of the Real
- Released: 1996
- Recorded: 1996
- Genre: Gangsta rap
- Length: 3:45 (album version); 4:10 (E.V.A. Mix)
- Label: Rhyme $yndicate; Virgin
- Songwriter(s): Tracy Lauren Marrow; Richard Ascencio; Steffon Lester Johns
- Producer(s): Ice-T; DJ Ace; Slej Tha Ruffedge

Ice-T singles chronology
"I Must Stand" (1996)	"The Lane" (1996)	"Valuable Game" (1999)

"The Lane" is a song by American recording artist Ice-T. It was released in 1996 as a single from the rapper's sixth studio album Ice-T VI: Return of the Real through Rhyme $yndicate Records/Virgin Records. The song was written and produced by Tracy "Ice-T" Marrow and Richard "DJ Ace" Ascencio. The single peaked at number 18 in the UK. "The Lane (E.V.A. Mix)" was later included in the rapper's greatest hits album Greatest Hits: The Evidence.

== Track listing ==
12", vinyl
No.	Title	Writer(s)	Producer(s)	Length
1.	"The Lane" (E.V.A. Mix)	T. Marrow; M. Perreault; P. Prilly; A. Badalamenti	Ice-T; DJ Ace; Secret Squirrel	4:10
2.	"The Lane" (Album Mix)	T. Marrow; R. Ascencio; S. Husayn	Ice-T; DJ Ace; SLEJ Da Ruff Edge	3:45

CD
No.	Title	Writer(s)	Producer(s)	Length
1.	"The Lane" (E.V.A. Mix)	T. Marrow; M. Perreault; P. Prilly; A. Badalamenti	Ice-T; DJ Ace; Secret Squirrel	4:10
2.	"The Lane" (Album Version)	T. Marrow; R. Ascencio; S. Husayn	Ice-T; DJ Ace; SLEJ Da Ruff Edge	3:45
3.	"Bouncin Down The Strezeet (DJ Ace Remix)" (featuring Mr. Wesside)	T. Marrow; R. Ascencio; W. Dawson	Ice-T; DJ Ace	4:09
4.	"Get My Cash On" (Clean Mix)	T. Marrow; R. Ascencio	Ice-T; DJ Ace	4:09

Sample credits

- Track "The Lane (E.V.A. Mix)" contains elements from "E.V.A." by Jean-Jacques Perrey from his 1970 album Moog Indigo
- Track "The Lane" contains elements from "UFO" by E.S.G. from their 1981 EP ESG

== Personnel ==
- Tracy Lauren Marrow – lyrics, vocals, producer
- Wesley "Mr. Wesside" Dawson – vocals (track 3)
- Richard "DJ Ace" Ascencio – producer, re-mixing (track 3)
- Shafiq "SLJ" Husayn – producer
- Secret Squirrel – re-mixing (track 1)
- Hills Archer Ink – artwork
- Jorge Hinojosa – management

== Charts ==
Chart (1996)	Peak position
UK Singles (OCC)	18
UK Dance (OCC)	25
UK Hip Hop/R&B (OCC)	6
