= Donald D =

American rapper

Donald-D
- Also known as: Microphone King Donald-D; Dondee
- Born: Donald Lamont
- Origin: The Bronx, New York, U.S.
- Genres: Hip hop
- Occupations: Record producer; rapper
- Years active: 1978–present
- Labels: Rhyme $yndicate Records; Epic; CBS; Sire; Warner Bros.

Donald Lamont, professionally known by his stage name Donald-D, is an American rapper and record producer from the Bronx, New York. He is a member of the Universal Zulu Nation, a member of the B-Boys, and is best known as a member of Ice-T's Rhyme Syndicate.

== Career ==
=== Late 1970s–1987: Universal Zulu Nation and the B-Boys ===
Donald D began his career in 1978 in the Bronx, New York, when he became a member of the Universal Zulu Nation joining forces with Afrika Islam, DJ Jazzy Jay, Kid Vicious and others as the group the Funk Machine. He was featured on Afrika Islam's radio show the Zulu Beats on WHBI in 1982. Lamont and DJ Chuck Chillout formed a group named the B-Boys. From 1983 to 1985, the group has released several 12" singles via Vincent Davis' Vintertainment and Morgan Khan's Streetwave labels, including a 12-inch extended play Cuttin' Herbie, which peaked at #90 on the UK Albums Chart. When the group disbanded, Donald D released a single "Dope Jam / Outlaw" with DJ Chilly-D via Rockin' Hard Records in 1987.

=== 1988–1992: Rhyme Syndicate ===
In 1985, Lamont met West Coast rapper Tracy 'Ice-T' Marrow and later went to Los Angeles, California to join the Rhyme Syndicate. His first appearances were in 1988 on the track "The Syndicate" with Hen Gee from Ice-T's album Power, and on the track "Name of the Game" from Rhyme Syndicate compilation album Comin' Through. Donald-D was featured on the posse-cut single "What Ya Wanna Do" and released his debut studio album titled Notorious in 1989. Reaching a peak position of number 78 on the Billboard Top R&B/Hip-Hop Albums, the album remained on the US chart for a total of 18 weeks, spawning a single "F.B.I. (Free Base Institute)", which also peaked at number 8 on the Billboard Hot Rap Songs. A year after, he made his guest appearance on his bandmate Everlast's debut album Forever Everlasting on the track "The Rhythm" with N'Dea Davenport and Ice-T. Lamont also appeared on two tracks from O.G. Original Gangster and provided audio production on Home Invasion. In 1992, Donald D released his sophomore studio effort titled Let the Horns Blow on Sire/Warner Bros. Records. The song "I'm Gonna Smoke Him" off the album was featured in Trespass (soundtrack).

=== 1993–present ===
In 1995, Donald D, Kurtis Blow and Prince Whipper Whip were featured on the track "Old School Jam" from DJ Honda's self-titled album.

In 2003, he released a single "Hip Hop / The Return of the Culture", that was later included in his debut solo extended play B.R.O.N.X. (Beats Rhymes of New Xperience), released in 2006 under Dondee alias. In the same year (2003), he's featured duetting with Marco Masini in the song Generation, in which he sings in English the final rap part (personally significant is the line «as a boy growing up / in the South South Bronx»).

He has started a new group with another Universal Zulu Nation Rhyme Syndicate member, DJ MC Dynamax, called the Bronx Syndicate.

== Discography ==
=== Solo albums ===
Year	Title	Labels	Chart position
1989	Notorious	Rhyme $yndicate/Epic/CBS Records	Top R&B/Hip-Hop Albums: #78
1991	Let the Horns Blow	Sire/Warner Bros. Records	—

=== Extended plays ===
- 2006 — B.R.O.N.X. (Beats Rhymes of New Xperience)

=== Singles ===
Year	Title	Album	Labels	Chart position
1987	"Outlaw" B-side: "Dope Jam"	—	Rockin' Hard Records	—
1988	"Name of the Game"	Rhyme Syndicate Comin' Through	Rhyme $yndicate Records	—
1989	"F.B.I" B-side: "Syndicate Posse"	Notorious	Rhyme $yndicate Records	Hot Rap Songs: #8
1989	"Notorious" B-side: "Hell Raiser"	Notorious	Rhyme $yndicate/Epic/CBS	—
1991	"Let the Horns Blow" B-side: "To the Beat Y'all" / "The Way It Used to Be"	Let the Horns Blow	Warner Bros. Records	—
1992	"I'm Gonna Smoke Him"	Let the Horns Blow and Trespass (soundtrack)	Sire Records	—
2003	"The Return of the Culture" B-side: "Hip Hop"	B.R.O.N.X. (Beats Rhymes of New Xperience)	Hot Shit Records	—

=== Guest appearances ===
Year	Track	Artist(s)	Album
1988	"Anything Can Happen (Acid Condominium Mix)"	Was (Not Was)	What Up, Dog?
1988	"The Syndicate"	Ice-T, Hen-Gee	Power
1988	"Name of the Game"	Bronx Style Bob	Rhyme Syndicate Comin' Through
1989	"What Ya Wanna Do"	Ice-T, Bronx Style Bob, Divine Styler, Everlast, Evil E, Hen-Gee, M.C. Taste, Nat The Cat, Randy Mac, Shakell Shabazz, Toddy Tee	The Iceberg/Freedom of Speech...Just Watch What You Say
1990	"The Rhythm"	Everlast, Ice-T, N'Dea Davenport	Forever Everlasting
1991	"Mic Contract"	Ice-T	O.G. Original Gangster
1991	"Fly By"	Ice-T, Nat The Cat	O.G. Original Gangster
1995	"Old School Jam"	DJ Honda, Kurtis Blow, Prince Whipper Whip	DJ Honda
1996	"Back Up Off Me"	No Doze Funkmob	Hooded Figures
1996	"180' in the Shade"	No Doze Funkmob	Hooded Figures
2000	"Hater"	DJ Yutaka, Grandmaster Caz, Melle Mel, Prince Whipper Whip	United Nations
2001	"Secret Wars"	Phoenix Orion, Team Eloheem, Big Foot, DK Toon, Dandelion, Darkzeid, Neb Luv, Peace, Quantum Gamma Zenith	Secret Wars
2003	Generation	Marco Masini	.. il mio cammino
2004	"Bring It 2 Me"	Large	Larger Than Life
2014	"Kings (Remixx)"	The Impossebulls, Chuck D	Everything Has Changed; Nothing Is Different (The Deluxe CeeDee)
2017	"Painstaking Arranger"	Carpetface	Cognitive Dis
