= Ice-T VI: Return of the Real =

Studio album by Ice-T
- Released: June 4, 1996
- Recorded: 1995–1996
- Studios: The Crackhouse (Los Angeles, CA); The Archive (Oakland, CA)
- Genres: West Coast hip hop; gangsta rap
- Length: 73:15
- Labels: Rhyme $yndicate; Priority
- Producers: Ice-T (exec.); Hen-Gee; DJ Ace; Big Rich; Mad Rome; San Man; Slej Tha Ruffedge; Aquel; Dre MC; E-A-Ski; Trails of Flowalistics; L.P.

Ice-T chronology
| Home Invasion (1993) | Ice-T VI: Return of the Real (1996) | The Seventh Deadly Sin (1999) |

Singles from Ice-T VI: Return of the Real
- 1. "I Must Stand" Released: 1996; 2. "The Lane" Released: 1996

Professional ratings
Review scores
| Source | Rating |
|---|---|
| AllMusic | 2.5/5 stars |
| Muzik | 3.5/5 stars |
| NME | 7/10 stars |
| Robert Christgau | (1-star Honorable Mention) |
| (The New) Rolling Stone Album Guide | 2.5/5 stars |
| The Source | 3/5 stars |

Ice-T VI: Return of the Real is the sixth studio album by American rapper Ice-T. It was released on June 4, 1996, via Rhyme $yndicate/Priority Records. The title is a play on words based on the movie Star Wars VI: Return of the Jedi, with the "VI" referring to it being his sixth album. Production was handled by several record producers, including Aquel, Big Rich, DJ Ace, Dre MC, E-A-Ski, Hen-Gee, Mad Rome, San Man, SLJ, Trials of Flowalistics, and Ice-T himself. It also features guest appearances from Hot Dolla, Powerlord JEL, Mr. Wesside, Godfather of Boo-Yaa T.R.I.B.E., Sean E. Sean of Body Count, Deft Saplin, K-Wiz Spurt, and Angela Rollins.

The album peaked at number 19 on the Billboard Top R&B/Hip-Hop Albums and at number 89 on the Billboard 200. One single, "I Must Stand", peaked at number 83 on the Billboard Hot R&B/Hip-Hop Songs and at number 21 on the Billboard Rap Songs. Along with a single, a music video was produced for the song, "I Must Stand". An unused demo from this album's sessions, titled "Here I Go Again", was later re-recorded by Ice-T with Body Count on Bloodlust.

== Track listing ==
| No. | Title | Producer(s) | Length |
|---|---|---|---|
| 1. | "Pimp Anthem" | San Man; LP (co.) | 4:35 |
| 2. | "Where the Shit Goes Down?" | E-A-Ski & CMT | 5:20 |
| 3. | "Bouncin' Down the Strezeet" (featuring Hot Dolla, Mr. Wesside & Powerlord JEL) | DJ Ace | 3:50 |
| 4. | "Return of the Real" | DJ Ace | 4:58 |
| 5. | "I Must Stand" (featuring Angela Rollins) | San Man; LP (co.) | 4:02 |
| 6. | "A Lotta Niggas" (featuring Sean E. Sean) | Ice-T | 0:58 |
| 7. | "Rap Game's Hijacked" | SLEJ Da Ruff Edge | 5:31 |
| 8. | "How Does It Feel" | Big Rich; Mad Rome | 4:30 |
| 9. | "The Lane" | SLEJ Da Ruff Edge; DJ Ace | 3:45 |
| 10. | "Rap Is Fake" (featuring Dee) | Ice-T | 0:44 |
| 11. | "Make the Loot Loop" | DJ Ace; LP (co.) | 3:39 |
| 12. | "Syndicate 4 Ever" (featuring Hot Dolla, L.P. & Powerlord JEL) | DJ Ace | 4:05 |
| 13. | "The 5th" | DJ Ace | 4:26 |
| 14. | "It's Goin' Down" | Ice-T | 0:33 |
| 15. | "They Want Me Back In" | DJ Ace | 3:09 |
| 16. | "Inside of a Gangsta" | Big Rich; Mad Rome | 4:03 |
| 17. | "Forced to Do Dirt" | Aquel | 4:55 |
| 18. | "Haters" | Ice-T | 0:45 |
| 19. | "Cramp Your Style" (featuring Deft Saplin & K-Wiz Spurt) | Trails of Flowalistics | 3:52 |
| 20. | "Real?" | Ice-T | 1:38 |
| 21. | "Dear Homie" (featuring Godfather) | Dre MC; Hen Gee | 3:57 |
| Total length: | | | 73:15 |

== Personnel ==
- Tracy Lauren Marrow – main artist, producer (tracks: 6, 10, 14, 18, 20), executive producer
- D. Brown – featured artist (tracks: 3, 12)
- Marlowe Bates – featured artist (tracks: 3, 12)
- Wesley Dawson – featured artist (track 3)
- Angela Rollins – featured artist (track 5)
- Ted Devoux – featured artist (track 21)
- Wendel Winston – featured artist (track 12), co-producer (tracks: 1, 5, 11)
- Dee – featured artist (track 10)
- Deft Saplin – featured artist (track 19)
- K-Wiz Spurt – featured artist (track 19)
- Sean E. Sean – featured artist (track 6)
- Bobby Ross Avila – talkbox (track 16)
- Eric Garcia – scratches
- Henry Garcia – producer (track 21), associate producer
- Richard Ascencio – producer (tracks: 3, 4, 9, 11–13, 15)
- Richard Bougere Jr. – producer (tracks: 8, 16)
- Romy Geroso Jr. – producer (tracks: 8, 16)
- Santiago Sanguillen – producer (tracks: 1, 5)
- Shafiq Husayn – producer (tracks: 7, 9)
- Shon Adams – producer (track 2)
- Denis Martinez – producer (track 19)
- Andre McPhearson – producer (track 21)
- Aquel – producer (track 17)
- Tom Baker – mastering
- David M. Halili – album cover painting & lettering
- Art Shoji – art direction
- Dana Hursey – photography
- Jorge Hinojosa – management
- Paul Filippone – management
- Eric Greenspan – management

== Charts ==
| Chart (1996) | Peak position |
|---|---|
| Australian Albums (ARIA) | 31 |
| Austrian Albums (Ö3 Austria) | 40 |
| German Albums (Offizielle Top 100) | 40 |
| Hungarian Albums (MAHASZ) | 18 |
| Scottish Albums (Official Charts) | 43 |
| Swedish Albums (Sverigetopplistan) | 56 |
| Swiss Albums (Schweizer Hitparade) | 19 |
| UK Albums (Official Charts) | 26 |
| US Billboard 200 | 89 |
| US Top R&B/Hip-Hop Albums (Billboard) | 19 |
