= I Must Stand =

Single by Ice-T

from the album Ice-T VI: Return of the Real
- B-side: "Where The Shit Goes Down"
- Released: April 9, 1996
- Studio: The Crackhouse (New York City, NY)
- Genre: Gangsta rap
- Length: 4:02
- Label: Rhyme $yndicate; Priority; Virgin
- Songwriters: Tracy Lauren Marrow; Santiago Sandy Sanguillen
- Producers: San Man; Ice-T

Ice-T singles chronology
"Born to Raise Hell" (1994)	"I Must Stand" (1996)	"The Lane" (1996)

Music video
- "I Must Stand" on YouTube

"I Must Stand" is a song by American recording artist Ice-T. It was released on April 9, 1996 as a single from the rapper's sixth studio album Ice-T VI: Return of the Real through Rhyme $yndicate Records/Priority Records/Virgin Records. The song was written and produced by Ice-T and Santiago "San Man" Sanguillen. The single peaked at number 83 on the Hot R&B/Hip-Hop Songs and number 23 on the Hot Rap Songs charts in the United States, and also reached number 23 and number 43 in the UK and Switzerland respectively. "I Must Stand" was later included in the rapper's greatest hits album Greatest Hits: The Evidence.

== Track listing ==
12" (US Version)
No.	Title	Writer(s)	Producer(s)	Length
1.	"I Must Stand" (Clean Version)	T. Marrow; S. Sanguillen	San-Man; Ice-T	4:02
2.	"I Must Stand" (Instrumental)	T. Marrow; S. Sanguillen	San-Man; Ice-T	4:02
3.	"Where It Goes Down" (Clean Version)	T. Marrow; S. Sanguillen	San-Man; Ice-T	4:07
4.	"Where the Shit Goes Down" (LP Version)	T. Marrow; S. Sanguillen	San-Man; Ice-T	5:20

12" (European Version)
No.	Title	Writer(s)	Producer(s)	Length
1.	"I Must Stand" (The Dumb Mix)	T. Marrow; S. Sanguillen; A. Utley; B. Gibbons; G. Barrow	San-Man; Ice-T	4:52
2.	"I Must Stand" (Full Length)(Life On The Streets)	T. Marrow; S. Sanguillen	Ice-T; San-Man	4:47
3.	"I Must Stand" (Straight Ghetto Vibe)	T. Marrow; S. Sanguillen	San-Man; Ice-T; TR Love	4:46
4.	"I Must Stand" (Album Version)	T. Marrow; S. Sanguillen	San-Man; Ice-T	3:59

CD
No.	Title	Writer(s)	Producer(s)	Length
1.	"I Must Stand" (The Dumb Mix)	T. Marrow; S. Sanguillen; A. Utley; B. Gibbons; G. Barrow	San-Man; Ice-T	4:52
2.	"I Must Stand" (Full Length)(Life On The Streets)	T. Marrow; S. Sanguillen	San-Man; Ice-T	4:47
3.	"I Must Stand" (Album Version)	T. Marrow; S. Sanguillen	San-Man; Ice-T	4:02
4.	"I Must Stand" (Instrumental With Hook)	T. Marrow; S. Sanguillen	San-Man; Ice-T	4:47

Sample credits

- Track "I Must Stand (The Dumb Mix)" contains elements from "Numb" by Portishead.

== Personnel ==
- Tracy Lauren Marrow – lyrics, vocals, backing vocals, producer
- Angela Rollins – backing vocals
- Nichele – backing vocals on "I Must Stand (Full Length) (Life On The Streets)"
- Eric Garcia – scratches
- Bobby Ross Avila – keyboards on "I Must Stand (Full Length) (Life On The Streets)"
- Santiago Sanguillen – producer
- Richard "DJ Ace" Ascencio – re-mixing (track: "I Must Stand (Full Length) (Life On The Streets)")
- Secret Squirel – re-mixing (track: "I Must Stand (The Dumb Mix)")
- Steve "Fred 40 To Tha Head" Fredrickson – re-mixing (track: "I Must Stand (Straight Ghetto Vibe)")
- Trevor Randolph – re-mixing (track: "I Must Stand (Straight Ghetto Vibe)")

== Charts ==
Chart (1996)	Peak position
Australia (ARIA Charts)	75
Switzerland (Schweizer Hitparade)	43
UK Singles (Official Charts)	23
UK Dance (Official Charts)	23
UK Hip Hop/R&B (Official Charts)	6
US Hot R&B/Hip-Hop Songs (Billboard)	83
US Hot Rap Songs (Billboard)	21
