= Power (Ice-T album) =

Studio album by Ice-T
- Released: September 13, 1988
- Studios: Syndicate Studios West, Los Angeles
- Genre: Gangsta rap
- Length: 48:02
- Label: Sire
- Producers: Ice-T; Afrika Islam

Ice-T chronology
Rhyme Pays (1987)	Power (1988)	The Iceberg/Freedom of Speech... Just Watch What You Say! (1989)

Singles from Power
- 1. "I'm Your Pusher" Released: August 23, 1988; 2. "High Rollers" Released: January 20, 1989

Power is the second studio album by American rapper Ice-T, released on September 13, 1988, by Sire Records. Recorded at Syndicate Studios West in Los Angeles, the home studio of DJ Evil E, it was produced by Ice-T and Afrika Islam. The Los Angeles Daily News noted that its lyrical themes ranged from sex to gun violence, and that Ice-T "implicates everyone from radio programmers to the police as accomplices in the decline of western civilisation." The album contains lyrics that began a feud between Ice-T and rapper LL Cool J. The album cover, which features Ice-T's then-girlfriend Darlene Ortiz, Ice-T, and DJ Evil E, was described as "perpetuating stereotypes" by the Chicago Tribune and "violence-glorifying" by both the Chicago Sun-Times and The Sydney Morning Herald.

Two singles were released from the album: "I'm Your Pusher" and "High Rollers". The album was certified platinum by 2006. Music critic Stephen Thomas Erlewine of AllMusic commented that on its release, Power received "strong reviews" and continued to receive positive retrospective reviews from music guides such as AllMusic, The Rolling Stone Album Guide and the Spin Alternative Record Guide.

== Background and production ==
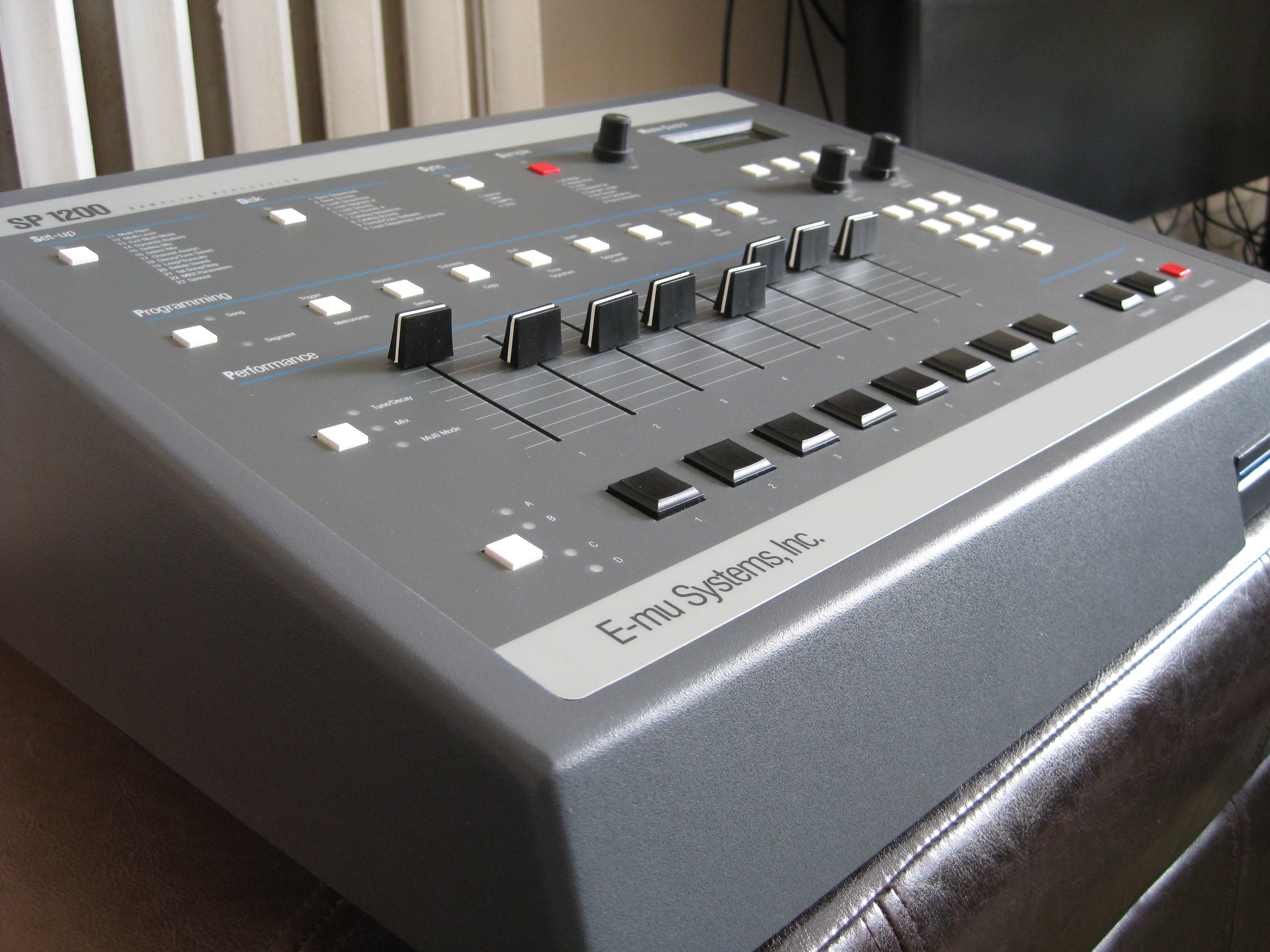
The beats on the album were made by Afrika Islam using an SP-1200 sampler (pictured) and a Roland 909 drum machine.

Following the success of Ice-T's album Rhyme Pays, which went gold in the United States, Ice-T was featured on the soundtrack to the film Colors (1988). He felt by the time he started working on Power that he "was aware that people were listening" and that he "had to be more serious, and ... get some points across". The beats for the album were written by Afrika Islam at his apartment with his SP-1200 sampler and a Roland 909 drum machine. Tracks such as "Drama" had a Roland TB-303 bass synthesizer connected to an SP-1200. Islam stated that he felt that he was creating a different sound for hip hop with this track as the 303 was usually only heard in techno music and that the 303 created a unique "shreiky sound". Others such as "Girls L.G.B.N.A.F." were made by connecting two Roland TR-909 drum machines together.

Power was recorded in Los Angeles at DJ Evil E's home, which was known as Syndicate Studios West. Ice-T described how Syndicate Studios West was set up with a board connected to speakers to resemble a car stereo system so they could test how tapes would sound. A closet in the home was converted into a booth to record the vocals. Afrika Islam noted that recording at his home meant the group had no time constraints while recording the album. Ice-T stated that recording it did not take a long time saying: "The recording was fast" and that he recorded every record he's made in "a matter of a month, maybe two at the most". Power was mixed at Entourage Studios in Los Angeles by Mark Wolfson. Some tracks feature guest vocalists, such as Donald D and Hen-Gee on "The Syndicate". Donald D was a DJing partner of Afrika Islam in the 1970s while Hen-Gee is DJ Evil-E's brother. The vocals on "I'm Your Pusher" are credited to Pimpin' Rex, who Ice-T mentioned was "one of my buddies, a real live pimp".

The Chicago Tribune noted the controversy surrounding the album cover, stating that Ice-T had been charged with perpetuating stereotypes with an album cover featuring a scantily clad woman. The Sydney Morning Herald described the cover as a "violence-glorifying, women-denigrating sleeve". The woman on the cover was Darlene Ortiz, Ice-T's girlfriend at the time. In 1989, the Los Angeles Daily News stated that: "Darlene has become as much a part of Ice-T's image as gangs, guns and boom boxes." Ortiz originally met Ice-T when she was 17, stating she was "totally smitten and ready to settle down" and that she "would've done whatever he asked". Of her appearance on the album cover she explained that it was "like nothing" for her. To prepare for the cover, Ortiz bought five different bathing suits and went to the photo studio with Glen E. Friedman. Ortiz felt comfortable with the sawed-off shotgun, stating that she got her first gun when she was 11 years old and that she thought "it would be a powerful statement to see a woman holding a gun". Ice-T chose the bathing suit and the red high heel pumps and earrings for the cover. Clothing on the cover was shared between shots. Ortiz and DJ Evil E both shared the gold bracelet for the photo shoot and Ice-T and DJ Evil E wore the same Rolex. Ortiz also appeared in music videos for the singles from Power – "I'm Your Pusher" and "High Rollers".

== Music and lyrics ==
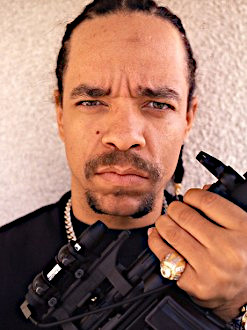
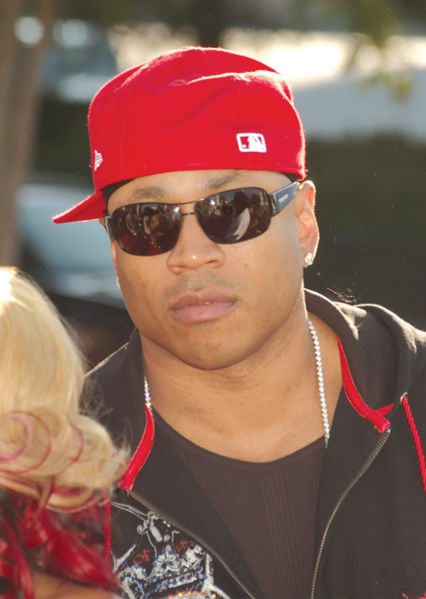
Ice-T (left) instigated a feud with LL Cool J (right) on Power by dissing him on the tracks "I'm Your Pusher" and "The Syndicate". LL Cool J later retaliated on his album Mama Said Knock You Out (1990).

The Los Angeles Daily News described Power's themes: "Sex and guns are but two forms of power explored on Ice-T's Power album, a disc that implicates everyone from radio programmers to the police as accomplices in the decline of western civilization." These tracks included "Radio Suckers", which Ice-T wrote to say he would not compromise his music to have it played on radio. He noted his albums still sold well without radio support. The final track on the album "Soul on Ice" was Ice-T's tribute to Iceberg Slim, whose books he read in high school. Ice-T described Slim as "fascinating" and said his books "made me wanna be a pimp".

"I'm Your Pusher" sees Ice-T dissing fellow rapper LL Cool J. Ice-T explained later that he felt that LL Cool J was "at that time on his 'I'm the great rapper in the world' thing. Me being from L.A., I was trying to rep our entire city alone, so had to step to him". Ice-T also replied that he had no personal problem with him but just "thought I could beat him rapping anyways". Ice-T stated that he recorded "Girls L.G.B.N.A.F." as a humorous response to LL Cool J's song "I Need Love". Ice-T stated that: "Girls came to me and asked, 'Ice, why don't you write a ballad'? Now can you imagine saying, 'I need loooove?' That's a wimp. So I wrote ('Girls') as a joke." LL Cool J later retaliated dissing Ice-T in his song "To da Break of Dawn" from his album Mama Said Knock You Out (1990). Afrika Islam said their feud ended when a group meeting involving Flavor Flav, DJ Red Alert, Mike Tyson, and Afrika Bambaataa persuaded them to stop fighting. Islam explained Tyson's role: "[he was] down with hip-hop and the Zulus and I've always considered rappers like boxers anyway". Ice-T commented on the feud in NME magazine in 2012, stating: "You need a nemesis in hip hop. It's part of what fuels good rap. L was coming out of New York saying he was the best rapper in the world. I was trying to get my feet out of LA. You can't have someone saying they're the best if you're trying to. We had a little hip hop thing but it was never serious."

== Release ==
Power was released in the United States on September 13, 1988, through Sire on vinyl, compact disc, and cassette. The album debuted on the Billboard 200 on October 1, 1988, at number 102. Power stayed on this chart for 33 weeks and peaked at number 35 on November 12, 1988. While touring to support Power, Ice-T visited schools as a mentor "telling the students of his shady past and profitable present". By January 1989, Power had sales of over 500,000 copies in the United States and went gold. A profanity-free version of the record was never released. Ice-T compared this to the release of N.W.A.'s album, stating that he felt releasing a clean album was "selling out" and that "N.W.A. made more money because of it, but I had my integrity."

The single "I'm Your Pusher" was released on August 23, 1988, by Sire. The follow-up single "High Rollers" was released on January 20, 1989. In the United Kingdom "High Rollers" charted on the UK Singles chart for two weeks, peaking at number 63 on the chart.

== Reception ==
Professional ratings
Review scores
Source	Rating
AllMusic	4.5/5 stars
RapReviews	8/10
(The New) Rolling Stone Album Guide	4/5 stars
Spin Alternative Record Guide	8/10
The Village Voice	B+

Erlewine commented that on its release, Power received "strong reviews". In contemporary reviews, The New York Times described Power as "Constantly menacing, the album affords no breathing room." The review noted: "Ice-T makes the claustrophobia work by spinning ever denser rhymes and more concrete images, remaining as intense as his subject. Power has the oppressive detail of a novel. Though Ice-T indulges in gallows humor ... he allows no release. If this is the life of a gangster, it is also hell." The review commented that along with Eazy-E's album Eazy-Duz-It, the rappers come off as "unenlightened when it comes to women. Whatever their rough spots, Power and Eazy-Duz-It represent the makings of a brutal new music scene." Robert Christgau, writing for the Village Voice, gave the album a B+ rating, noting that Ice-T had "his own sound—flat, clipped, quick-lipped. And when he sticks to his subject, his narrative style is as gripping and understated as Islam's samples." The Sydney Morning Herald opined that Ice-T's "odd attempts at making a moral point become lost amidst the nauseating imagery, though the music's malevolent power is impossible to deny".

From retrospective reviews, the Spin Alternative Record Guide compared Power to Ice-T's previous album Rhyme Pays stating it was "richer, and much more clearly didactic". The review highlighted "I'm Your Pusher", opining that it "might still be Ice-T's most unforgettable song". AllMusic described the release as "outstanding", and noted that "in the next few years, gangsta rap would degenerate into nothing more than cheap exploitation and empty clichés, but in Ice's hands, it was as informative as it was captivating". (The New) Rolling Stone Album Guide gave the album a four star rating, declaring that the messages on the album were still relevant but that found the drum programming had not dated well.

== Track listing ==
All songs are composed and produced by Ice-T and Afrika Islam except where noted.

No.	Title	Writer(s)	Length
1.	"Intro"		1:11
2.	"Power"		4:25
3.	"Drama"		4:15
4.	"Heartbeat"		4:08
5.	"The Syndicate"		3:32
6.	"Radio Suckers"		4:24
7.	"I'm Your Pusher"	Ice-T; Afrika Islam; Curtis Mayfield	5:35
8.	"Personal"		3:43
9.	"Girls L.G.B.N.A.F."		3:00
10.	"High Rollers"		4:36
11.	"Grand Larceny"		3:51
12.	"Soul on Ice"		4:42
13.	"Outro"		0:39

== Personnel ==
Credits are adapted from the sleeve, sticker and back cover of Power.

- Ice-T – producer, writer, arrangements, executive producer
- Afrika Islam – producer, programming
- Mark (Full Moon) Wolfson – mix engineer
- Glen E. Friedman – photography
- Kav Deluxe – design
- Jorge Hinojosa – management
- DJ Evil E – cutting
- Pimpin' Rex – performer (on "I'm Your Pusher")
- Microphone King Donald D and DJ Hen G – performer (on "The Syndicate")
- Amazing Many Styles Kid Jazz – performer (on "High Rollers")
- Bilal Bashir – programming (on "Personal")

== Charts ==
Chart (1988)	Peak position
US Billboard 200	35
US Top R&B/Hip-Hop Albums (Billboard)	6

Chart (2023)	Peak position
Hungarian Physical Albums (MAHASZ)	27

== Certifications ==
Region	Certification	Certified units/sales
Australia (ARIA)	Gold	35,000^{^}
Canada (Music Canada)	Gold	50,000^{^}
United States (RIAA)	Platinum	1,000,000^{^}
^{^} Shipments figures based on certification alone.

== See also ==
- 1988 in hip hop music
- 1988 in music
- New school hip hop
