= We're in This Together (album) =

Album by Low Profile

Studio album by Low Profile
- Released: January 25, 1990
- Recorded: 1989
- Studio: Milagre Sound Recorders (Glendale, CA)
- Genre: Hip-hop
- Length: 45:49
- Label: Priority
- Producer: Doug Young (exec.); DJ Aladdin

We're in This Together is the lone studio album by American hip-hop duo Low Profile. It was released on January 25, 1990 through Priority Records, and it was produced entirely by DJ Aladdin. The album peaked at number 66 on the US Billboard Top R&B/Hip-Hop Albums.

== Production ==
We're in This Together was recorded and mixed at Milagre Sound Recorders in Glendale, California.

== Release ==
Two singles from "We're in This Together" charated "Pay Ya Dues" which peaked at #8 on the Hot Rap Songs, and "Funky Song", which peaked at #87 on the Hot R&B/Hip-Hop Songs. Music videos for both of the singles were directed by actor and director Jon Gries,

== Critical reception ==
Professional ratings
Review scores
Source	Rating
AllMusic	3/5 stars
RapReviews	8/10

From retrospective reviews, Alex Henderson of AllMusic stated the WC and DJ Aladdin showed some potential on its first and only album" declaring the album "decent if uneven" specifically praising "How Ya Livin'" and "That's Why They Do It" as "riveting" while "Pay Ya Dues" made "a meaningful statement about rappers who get ahead without paying dues, but is marred by a homophobic reference."

== Track listing ==
All tracks are written by WC and DJ Aladdin

No.	Title	Length
1.	"Funky Song"	3:57
2.	"That's Y They Do It"	4:31
3.	"Pay Ya Dues"	4:40
4.	"Easy Money"	3:18
5.	"Keep Em' Flowin'"	4:57
6.	"Aladdin's On A Rampage"	4:42
7.	"How Ya Livin'"	3:51
8.	"Comin' Straight From The Heart"	4:19
9.	"We're In This Together"	4:23
10.	"Make Room For The Dub.B.U."	3:47
11.	"No Mercy"	3:24
Total length:		45:49

Sample credits

- Track 3 contains a sample of "More Bounce to the Ounce" written by Roger and Larry Troutman and performed by Zapp.

== Personnel ==
Credits adapted from the album's liner notes.

- DJ Aladdin – producer
- Doug Young – executive producer
- Guy Manganiello – A&R direction
- Kevin Hosmann – art direction
- Dennis Keeley – photography

== Chart history ==
Album

Chart (1990)	Peak position
US Top R&B/Hip-Hop Albums (Billboard)	66
