= Trespass (film score) =

Film score by Various artists
- Released: 1993
- Genre: Jazz, Blues rock, Country and Western
- Length: 39:11
- Label: Sire / Warner Bros.
- Producer: Ry Cooder; Jim Keltner

Professional ratings
Review scores
Source	Rating
Allmusic	4.5/5 stars

The film score to the 1992 film Trespass, was heavily influenced by experimental jazz. The performers include producers Ry Cooder and Jim Keltner, as well as Jon Hassell.

== Track listing ==
1. Cooder, Hassell, Keltner – "Video Drive-By" – 1:55
2. Cooder, Hassell, Keltner – "Trespass (Main Title)" – 1:38
3. Cooder, Hassell, Keltner – "East St. Louis" – 2:01
4. Cooder, Hassell, Keltner – "Orgill Bros." – 1:44
5. Cooder, Hassell, Keltner – "Goose and Lucky" – 3:35
6. Cooder, Hassell, Keltner – "You Think It's on Now" – 1:41
7. Cooder, Hassell, Keltner – "Solid Gold" – 0:58
8. Cooder, Hassell, Keltner – "Heroin" – 4:13
9. Cooder, Hassell, Keltner – "Totally Boxed In" – 6:48
10. Cooder, Hassell, Keltner – "Give' Em Cops" – 1:27
11. Cooder, Hassell, Keltner – "Lucy in the Trunk" –3:46
12. Cooder, Hassell, Keltner – "We're Rich" – 2:26
13. Cooder, Hassell, Keltner – "King of the Streets" – 3:59
14. Cooder, Hassell, Keltner – "Party Lights" – 3:00

== See also ==
- Trespass (soundtrack)
