= Trespass (1992 film) =

1992 film directed by Walter Hill

- Theatrical poster
- Directed by: Walter Hill
- Written by: Bob Gale; Robert Zemeckis
- Produced by: Neil Canton
- Starring: Bill Paxton; Ice T; William Sadler; Ice Cube
- Cinematography: Lloyd Ahern II
- Edited by: Freeman A. Davies
- Music by: Ry Cooder
- Production companies: Universal Pictures; South Side Amusement Company
- Distributed by: Universal Pictures
- Release date: December 25, 1992
- Running time: 101 minutes
- Country: United States
- Language: English
- Budget: $14 million
- Box office: $13,747,138; 70,542 admissions (France)

Trespass is a 1992 American crime thriller film directed by Walter Hill, written by Bob Gale and Robert Zemeckis, and starring Bill Paxton, Ice T, William Sadler, and Ice Cube. In the film, two firemen decide to search an abandoned building for a hidden treasure, but wind up being targeted by a street gang.

The screenplay, originally titled The Looters, was written in 1977. Filming took place in Atlanta, Georgia and Memphis, Tennessee. Following the 1992 Los Angeles riots, the film was retitled and its original release date of July 3, 1992 was pushed back. It was released on December 25, 1992, by Universal Pictures. It received mixed reviews from critics and was a box-office bomb, grossing $13.7 million against a budget of $14 million.

== Plot ==
Two Fort Smith, Arkansas firemen, Vince and Don, meet a hysterical old man in a burning building. The old man hands them an envelope, telling them that he stole from Jesus Christ. The old man tells them that he stole some things and stashed them on the fifth floor of an apartment building, and he never told anyone. He forces them to take the envelope and leave at gunpoint, prays for forgiveness, then commits suicide by allowing himself to be engulfed in flames. Outside the fire and away from everyone else, Vince uncovers what was in the envelope and turns out to contain a newspaper article, the old man's ID, a map, and a gold cross. Vince and Don research the man, discovering that he was a thief who, in 1940, stole a large amount of gold valuables from a church that were on loan from Greece and hid them in a building in East St. Louis, Illinois. The two decide to drive to the building and find the treasure thinking they can get there, get the gold, and get back in one day.

While searching the building, Vince is spotted by a gang, led by King James, who is there to execute an enemy. Vince and Don witness the murder, but give themselves away and only manage to force a stalemate when they grab Lucky, James' half-brother. Barricading themselves behind a door, they continue trying to find the gold. Adding to their troubles is an old homeless man, Bradlee, who had stumbled upon them while they were trying to find the gold.

James eventually calls in some reinforcements. While doing some reconnaissance, Raymond, the man who supplies guns to James, finds Don and Vince's car and the news of the gold, and figures out why "two white boys" would be in their neighborhood. Raymond manipulates Savon, one of James' men (who would rather just kill Don and Vince than follow James' approach of trying to talk to them) into shooting at Don and Vince. Lucky says he needs to have a shot of heroin from his drug bag he had on him as he starts to cough continuously. Don releases one of Lucky's arms so he can use the syringe but instead stabs Don in the neck and tries to escape. Vince and Lucky get into a struggle and then one of James' men, Luther, spots the struggle through the window and takes aim with a sniper rifle which eventually leads to Lucky being shot by accident. James is now furious thinking that Don and Vince killed Lucky and runs after them, who have now found the stash of gold (having determined the map was drawn with the intention of looking UP at the ceiling, instead of down at the floor) and are trying to get out with it while avoiding James.

Vince orders Bradlee to take the weakened Don into the other room and lock themselves in the room while he climbs up the chimney to get some help. Once up on the roof, Vince rappels down the building but James spots him and before he can shoot Vince, Vince crashes through the window of another floor and escapes down the stairs. Meanwhile, Bradlee accidentally makes a noise, drawing the attention of one of James' men, Wickey, who grabs an axe and breaks down the door. Wickey is then ambushed by the now recovered Don who then takes his gun and Don is confronted by James. Don and James end up shooting and killing each other. Savon and Raymond also kill each other. The building they were in gets burned to the ground. Vince encounters Bradlee outside the building, and Bradlee tells Vince to run (Vince cannot drive away, since Raymond ripped out the wires in the engine of Don's SUV, gave the SUV four flat tires, and cut the line to Don's CB radio). Once Vince is out of the way, Bradlee picks up the haul of gold that was left behind and walks away, laughing.

== Cast ==
- Bill Paxton as Vince Gillian
- Ice T as James "King James"
- William Sadler as Don Perry
- Ice Cube as Savon
- Art Evans as Bradlee
- De'voreaux White as "Lucky"
- Bruce A. Young as Raymond
- Glenn Plummer as Luther
- Stoney Jackson as "Wickey"
- T.E. Russell as "Video"
- Tommy Lister Jr. as Cletus
- John Toles-Bey as "Goose"
- Byron Minns as "Moon"
- Tico Wells as Davis

In addition, Hal Landon Jr. appears as Eugene DeLong, while James Pickens Jr. and L. Warren Young portray police officers Reese and Foley, respectively.

== Production ==
=== Development ===
The script was originally called The Looters and Robert Zemeckis and Bob Gale wrote it in 1977. Years later, producer Neil Canton showed it to director Walter Hill. Hill says he liked the script "enormously":

I was quite surprised because it's certainly not the kind of story that Zemeckis and Gale identified with... but I thought it was enormously primal, elemental, brutal, and a great confrontation. It was totally dependent upon the narrative circumstances to reveal character and of course it took place in a time compression—both are things I'm very fond of.

Hill was a writer and tended to work on the scripts of all his films:

I don't think the script changed all that much, to tell you the truth. Although there's certainly no scene in the movie that wasn't rewritten many times. The script evolved because of certain location problems and we worked out a new ending. The only thing that is significantly different from the script is that the film gives a lot more screen time to King James and his gang and the ending is quite a bit different from the original.

"I wanted to make a down-and-dirty thriller", said Hill. "I wanted to shoot it in a fast, hard style. I wanted to work off the cuff, making it all happen right there."

Hill says the film was not intentionally political.

It is an adventure story that harkens back to a Jack London tradition. And what makes that striking, is that it is so much more real than what we presume action adventure movies to be—what they have evolved to be in the last 20 years. When I was a kid, they were all about very real people in tough circumstances, now the action movie is half science fiction movie. This movie is very much a throwback in that sense—with the permanently strained relations between blacks and whites and browns and orientals in our ghettos, our inner cities... But... just because the films intentions are not political, doesn't mean it's not political. Movies take on their own life. This is not a movie about racial confrontation in the sense that the confrontation had nothing to do with race... Inevitably, white and black attitudes spill into the movie because of the attempt to create some kind of social reality out of the situation.

=== Casting ===
Hill says Ice T and Ice Cube were hired on their strength as actors. "I'm a rhythm-and-blues man, myself", he said. "I'm not particularly a rap fan and (before production began) I'd never heard any of their records."

"This is the first film where I'm the point blank star, where I'm carrying the movie", said Ice T.

"I think it's good for the kids to see black faces on the screen in all kinds of movies", said Ice Cube. "Every movie doesn't have to be about the black families in the ghetto. This one is about money and how it can make people turn evil."

=== Shooting ===
Hill says the idea to have so much of the movie shot through video tape came as they were getting ready to make the movie. He read an article in The Washington Post about street gangs who would film a lot of their own activities. Hill:

I simply saw it as a visual opportunity to play a lot of the movie through a viewfinder. I thought it might get you inside the gang better... I wanted everything to be rough around the edge. We shot most of the movie hand held... I wanted it to be herky-jerky. We Dutched a lot of the angles, especially as the story unfolds because the story gets crazier and crazier. We went from a less elegant—the early parts of the movie, there are no hand helds at all—but as the story gets more nervous and crazy, we go more and more to a hand held thing until, finally, the end of the movie is all entirely hand held.

Filming began on November 4, 1991. The film was mostly shot at the vacant Fulton Bag and Cotton Mills, formerly an operating mill complex located in the Cabbagetown neighborhood of Atlanta. Construction of the complex began in 1881 on the south side of the Georgia Railroad line, east of downtown Atlanta, on the site of the Atlanta Rolling Mill. The site now includes separate phases of multi-family dwellings including for-rent apartments (called The Fulton Cotton Mill Lofts) and for-sale condominiums (The Stacks). Filming also took place at the Tennessee Brewery building in Memphis. Filming was completed on February 5, 1992.

Hill allowed Ice T and Ice Cube input into the dialogue. "They certainly had a lot of input in terms of, "What my guy would say is this. He wouldn't say it that way; he'd say it this way." And I gave them a very free reign [sic] on all that."

=== Music ===
A musical score had been written by John Zorn - the resulting recordings were released as volume two (Music for an untitled film by Walter Hill) of Zorn's series of Filmworks CDs - but Hill was dissatisfied with it and he brought in Ry Cooder to do a new score. Cooder says Hill "wanted something that was spooky and weird, and I got some experimental instruments together and improvised in the studio with Jim Keltner and Jon Hassell." Cooder said it was "difficult for me to musically relate to a film that mostly took place indoors. Trespass's environment hardly changed, and it was interesting for me to solve the problems that brought up."

== Release ==
The film was meant to be released on July 3, but this date was delayed due to the 1992 Los Angeles riots; the film was retitled and a new marketing campaign devised.

"The movie tested great", said Universal chairman Tom Pollock. "Unfortunately, it can't work now on its own terms. Attention would focus on black guys with machine guns going after white guys. It would be irresponsible to release it now, even under a different title."

Ice T said, "When we were shooting the movie, you'd say 'Looters' and everybody'd go 'Loo-loo-what?' You'd have to spell it. After the riots, everybody's like, oh, you doin' a movie called 'Looters' – about the riots?"

The movie was also given a new ending after test screenings wherein black audiences expressed dissatisfaction with the end, when both Ice T's and Ice Cube's characters died. "The message of the movie got lost in the gunfire", said Bob Gale. This is why the death scene of Ice Cube's character Savon is not shown. An alternate ending was also filmed during production in which Raymond is not killed by Savon but instead he gets shot in the leg by Vince who along with Bradlee escapes in Raymond's Jaguar and they turn the gold to the police.

Jazz musician John Zorn originally scored the entire film, complete with multiple cues and even scored both the original and alternate endings. Hill fired Zorn because he was unhappy with his score and hired his old friend Ry Cooder to rescore the whole film.

"Somehow, the riots tainted the movie", said Hill, and when the picture's release was pushed back, "inevitably, a lot of people came to the conclusion that you have something to hide, something to be ashamed of... If the movie is successful on the terms I call successful, it should be disturbing . . . which it is to some degree. It's not a social statement and does not offer a cure-the action, the characters are fictional-but like any good story there's a certain amount of social truth to it."

The film was also retitled as it was felt Looters was too inflammatory. The studio came up with fifty alternative titles and the filmmakers at least another twenty, including "Point of No Return", "The Intruders", "Burning Gold", "Greed", "Fire Trap" and "Blood and Gold", among others. Hill did not like Trespass because it reminded him of a title of a 1950s-era RKO movie starring Robert Mitchum and Jane Russell. "Psychologically, changing the name was more devastating than moving the movie because it was like changing the name of one of your children", he said. "But with the two Ices and the title 'Looters,' I had to see (Universal's) point." Eventually he settled on Trespass.

The film was also affected by controversy when Ice T asked Warner Bros. to remove the song "Cop Killer" from his album Body Count.

"Our chance lies in counter programming", said Bob Gale. "There's so much sweetness and light this time of year, why not an action picture? Trespass, unlike so many other current releases, delivers what it sets out to deliver in 101 minutes. For my money, that's holiday enough."

=== Reception ===
The film gained mixed to positive reviews from critics. As of October 5, 2023, Trespass holds a 70% critics' rating on Rotten Tomatoes based on 30 reviews, with an average rating of 6.3/10. The consensus summarizes: "Trespass pits public servants against gangsters in a race for stolen loot -- and thanks to a killer cast and Walter Hill's assured direction, the audience wins."

On At the Movies, Gene Siskel said the film's characters were "clichés brought together" and he considered the gang's camcorder footage gimmicky. His colleague Roger Ebert called the film "well-crafted" but said the characters were "manufactured out of parts of other movies." Both critics gave the film a "thumbs down."

=== Box office ===
The film debuted poorly. In the United States and Canada, Trespass grossed $13.7 million at the box office.

=== Home media ===
101 Films reissued Trespass on DVD and Blu-ray in 2018, with extras including a commentary with Ice Cube biographer Joel McIver and journalist Angus Batey, a second commentary with Nathaniel Thompson and Howard S. Berger, and interviews with Sadler, producer Neil Canton and co-writer Bob Gale.

== See also ==
- List of firefighting films
- Trespass (film score)
- Trespass (soundtrack)
