= I Ain't New Ta This =

Single by Ice-T

from the album Home Invasion
- B-side: "Mixed Up"
- Released: April 14, 1993
- Studio: Soundcastle (California)
- Genre: Gangsta rap
- Length: 5:01 (album version); 4:10 (radio version)
- Label: Rhyme $yndicate
- Songwriter(s): Tracy Lauren Marrow; Alphonso Henderson
- Producer(s): DJ Aladdin; Slej Tha Ruffedge; Ice-T

Ice-T singles chronology
"Ricochet" (1991)	"I Ain't New Ta This" (1993)	"That's How I'm Livin'" (1993)

Music video
- "I Aint New Ta This" on YouTube

"I Ain't New Ta This" is a song performed by American recording artist Ice-T. It was released as the first single from the rapper's fifth studio album Home Invasion (and his first single after his departure from Warner Bros. Records). The song was produced by Tracy "Ice-T" Marrow, Shafiq "SLJ" Husayn and Alphonso "DJ Aladdin" Henderson, and released on April 14, 1993 via Rhyme $yndicate Records. The single peaked at number 62 in the UK and number 49 in New Zealand.

== Track listing ==
No.	Title	Writer(s)	Producer(s)	Length
1.	"I Ain't New Ta This" (Radio Version)	T. Marrow; A. Henderson	DJ Aladdin; Ice-T; SLEJ Da Ruff Edge	4:10
2.	"I Ain't New Ta This" (Instrumental)	T. Marrow; A. Henderson	DJ Aladdin; Ice-T; SLEJ Da Ruff Edge	4:44
3.	"I Ain't New Ta This" (A Capella)	T. Marrow; A. Henderson	DJ Aladdin; Ice-T; SLEJ Da Ruff Edge	3:55
4.	"I Ain't New Ta This" (Album Version)	T. Marrow; A. Henderson	DJ Aladdin; Ice-T; SLEJ Da Ruff Edge	5:01
5.	"Mixed Up" (featuring SLEJ Da Ruff Edge)	T. Marrow; A. Henderson	DJ Aladdin; Ice-T; SLEJ Da Ruff Edge	4:55
6.	"Mixed Up" (Instrumental)	T. Marrow; A. Henderson	DJ Aladdin; Ice-T; SLEJ Da Ruff Edge	4:55

== Personnel ==
- Tracy Lauren Marrow – vocals, lyrics, producer
- Alphonso Henderson – producer
- Shafiq "SLJ" Husayn – producer
- Tony Pizarro – engineering
- Kev D – assistant engineering
- Dino Paredes – art direction
- Jesse Frohman – photography
- Jorge Hinojosa – management

== Chart positions ==
Chart (1993)	Peak position
New Zealand (Recorded Music NZ)	49
UK Singles (OCC)	62
