= New Jack Hustler (Nino's Theme) =

Single by Ice-T

from the album New Jack City (soundtrack) and O.G. Original Gangster
- Released: 1991
- Studio: Wide Tracks (Hollywood, CA)
- Genre: Gangsta rap
- Length: 4:44
- Label: Sire; Warner Bros. Records
- Songwriters: Tracy Lauren Marrow; Alphonso Henderson
- Producers: Ice-T (also exec.); DJ Aladdin

Ice-T singles chronology
"Dick Tracy" (1990)	"New Jack Hustler (Nino's Theme)" (1991)	"O.G. Original Gangster" (1991)

Music video
- "New Jack Hustler (Nino's Theme)" on YouTube

Professional ratings
Review scores
Source	Rating
AllMusic	4.5/5 stars

"New Jack Hustler (Nino's Theme)" is a song written and performed by American recording artist Ice-T. It was released as a single from the soundtrack album to the 1991 film New Jack City and from the rapper's fourth studio album, O.G. Original Gangster (1991). It was recorded at Wide Tracks Recording Studio in Hollywood, California, produced by Alphonso "DJ Aladdin" Henderson and Tracy "Ice-T" Marrow, and released in 1991 via Warner Bros. Records. Reaching a peak position of number 67 on the US Billboard Hot 100, the single remained on the chart for a total of 8 weeks. It was nominated for Grammy Award for Best Rap Solo Performance at 34th Annual Grammy Awards, but lost to LL Cool J's "Mama Said Knock You Out".

== Background ==
In the song, Ice-T raps about the life of a hustler. In the movie, Wesley Snipes plays a hustler named Nino Brown hence the title. The lyrics are narrated in the first person from the perspective of a drug dealer, and tell "the story of a cold-blooded coke dealer who's destined to fall. There'll be another one after me, he raps."

The song uses samples from Bobbi Humphrey's "Jasper Country Man", James Brown's "Blues and Pants", Sly and the Family Stone's "You Can Make It if You Try", Stanley Turrentine & Milt Jackson's "Sister Sanctified" and ESG's "UFO".

== Track listing ==
No.	Title	Writer(s)	Producer(s)	Length
1.	"New Jack Hustler (Nino's Theme)" (Master Street Mix)	T. Marrow; A. Henderson	DJ Aladdin; Ice-T	4:44
2.	"New Jack Hustler (Nino's Theme)" (Instrumental)	T. Marrow; A. Henderson	DJ Aladdin; Ice-T	4:44
3.	"New Jack Hustler (Nino's Theme)" (Master Radio Version)	T. Marrow; A. Henderson	DJ Aladdin; Ice-T	4:44
4.	"New Jack Hustler (Nino's Theme)" (Dub Version)	T. Marrow; A. Henderson	DJ Aladdin; Ice-T	4:44

== Personnel ==
- Tracy Lauren Marrow – vocals, lyrics, producer, executive producer
- Alphonso Henderson – producer, programming, arranging
- Vachik Aghaniantz – mixing
- Dennis "Def-Pea" Parker – recording
- Steve Hall – mastering
- Dirk Walter – design
- Joel Warren – photography
- Jorge Hinojosa – management

== Music video ==
The music video for "New Jack Hustler (Nino's Theme)" was released in 1991. It features a cameo appearance by Mike Tyson.

== Charts ==
Chart (1991)	Peak position
Australia (ARIA)	73
UK Dance (Music Week)	46
US Billboard Hot 100	67
