= I'm Your Pusher (Ice-T song) =

Single by Ice-T

from the album Power
- B-side: "Girls L.G.B.N.A.F."
- Released: August 23, 1988
- Studio: Syndicate Studios West (Los Angeles, California)
- Genre: Gangsta rap
- Length: 5:35
- Label: Sire
- Songwriter(s): Tracy Marrow; Charles Glenn; Curtis Mayfield
- Producer(s): Ice-T; Afrika Islam

Ice-T singles chronology
"Colors" (1988)	"I'm Your Pusher" (1988)	"High Rollers" (1988)

Music video
- "I'm Your Pusher" on YouTube

"I'm Your Pusher" is a 1988 single by American rapper Ice-T, from his second album Power.

The song's lyrics recommend the use of music and dancing to feel good rather than using drugs: "The dope I'm selling you don't smoke / You feel out in the dance floor on my world tour / I'm selling dope in each and every record store". However, the anti-drug theme was interpreted as having the opposite message, possibly as a result of misinterpretation of the context of the title, and ignorance as to the actual lyrical content.

The song was produced by Ice-T and Afrika Islam for Rhyme Syndicate Productions. It contains a sample from "Pusherman" by Curtis Mayfield.

== Track listing ==
=== Side A ===
1. "I'm Your Pusher" (LP Version)
2. "I'm Your Pusher" (Instrumental)
3. "I'm Your Pusher" (A Capella)

=== Side B ===
4. "Girls L.G.B.N.A.F." (LP Version)
5. "Girls L.G.B.N.A.F." (Instrumental)
6. "Girls L.G.B.N.A.F." (A Capella)

== Uses in pop culture ==
In 1989, the song was used in the beginning of the Season Two episode of the television series Midnight Caller entitled "Take Back the Streets".

Eminem parodied the chorus to the song in his track I'm Shady from The Slim Shady LP, which was about his experiences with taking drugs.

== Music video ==
The music video was released in 1988 and it features cameos by Big Daddy Kane and Kool DJ Red Alert.

== Charts ==
=== Weekly charts ===
Chart (1988)	Peak position
US Billboard Hot Black Singles	13
US Billboard Dance Club Songs	21
