= DJ Chuck Chillout =

American hip-hop DJ and producer (born 1962)

- Also known as: DJ Born Supreme Allah
- Born: Charles Turner; October 21, 1962 (age 63); The Bronx, New York, U.S.
- Origin: The Bronx, New York
- Genres: Hip hop; R&B
- Occupations: DJ; producer
- Instruments: Turntables, sampler
- Years active: 1982–present
- Label: Mercury/PolyGram

Charles Turner (born October 21, 1962), also known as DJ Chuck Chillout, is an American hip hop DJ and producer.

== Biography ==
DJ Chuck Chillout began his career on New York City's WRKS 98.7 Kiss FM radio station in 1982, where he stayed until leaving in 1989.

Chuck joined 107.5 WBLS FM in 1990 for two years. Chuck worked in 1995 by becoming one of the first DJs to play hip hop music in Japan. Hip-hop artists such as Busta Rhymes, A Tribe Called Quest, and Run-D.M.C. became known in Japan as a result. "Hip hop was very popular in Japan", said Chuck, "The people there knew the history of the artist I was playing as well as mine. Japanese people were totally into the culture".

In 1989, he released an album with emcee Kool Chip called Masters of the Rhythm, which was released by Mercury/PolyGram Records. The album featured two regional hits, "Rhythm is the Master" and "I’m Large."

In 1996, Chuck helped DMX for his debut smash hit, "Get at Me, Dog".

Chuck established Full Blast Promotions in 1999. "I established Full Blast Promotions in New Jersey because there was a need for a premier record pool in New Jersey," Chuck stated.

Chuck's affiliation with old- and new-school hip hop and R&B has helped him remain a popular DJ. Most recently, he participated in the Essence Music Festival.

== Discography ==
Albums

- D.J. Chuck Chillout & Kool Chip—Masters Of The Rhythm (Mercury/PolyGram) 1989

Singles & EPs

- Chuck Chillout: Hip Hop On Wax—Volume 1 (Vintertainment) 1984
- Mike and Glenn with Chuck Chillout—“No” (Vintertainment) 1986
- D.J. Chuck Chillout & Kool Chip—“I’m Large” (Mercury/PolyGram) 1989
- D.J. Chuck Chillout & Kool Chip—“Rhythm is the Master” (Mercury/PolyGram) 1989

== Sampling ==
- Kool and the Gang "Music is The Message" - "Roll Call"
- Cameo "Rigor Mortis" - "That's Life"
- Cimande "Bra" - "Time to Rhyme"
- Talking Heads "Once in a Lifetime" - "Rhythm is the Master"
- Strafe: “Set it Off”—“Rhythm is the Master”
- Incredible Bongo Band "Apache" - "The Mic I Grip"
- Theme from James Bond—“I’m Large”
