= Low Profile =

American rap duo

- From left to right: DJ Aladdin, WC

Background information
- Origin: Los Angeles, California, U.S.
- Genres: West Coast hip-hop
- Years active: 1987–1990
- Labels: Rhyme $yndicate, Priority
- Past members: DJ Aladdin; WC

Low Profile were an American hip-hop duo from Los Angeles, California. The group consisted of record producer DJ Alladin and rapper WC, who went on to pursue a career in visual arts. The duo made its debut with Rhyme $yndicate Records, on a compilation album produced by Ice-T and Afrika Islam, before becoming a duo on Priority Records.

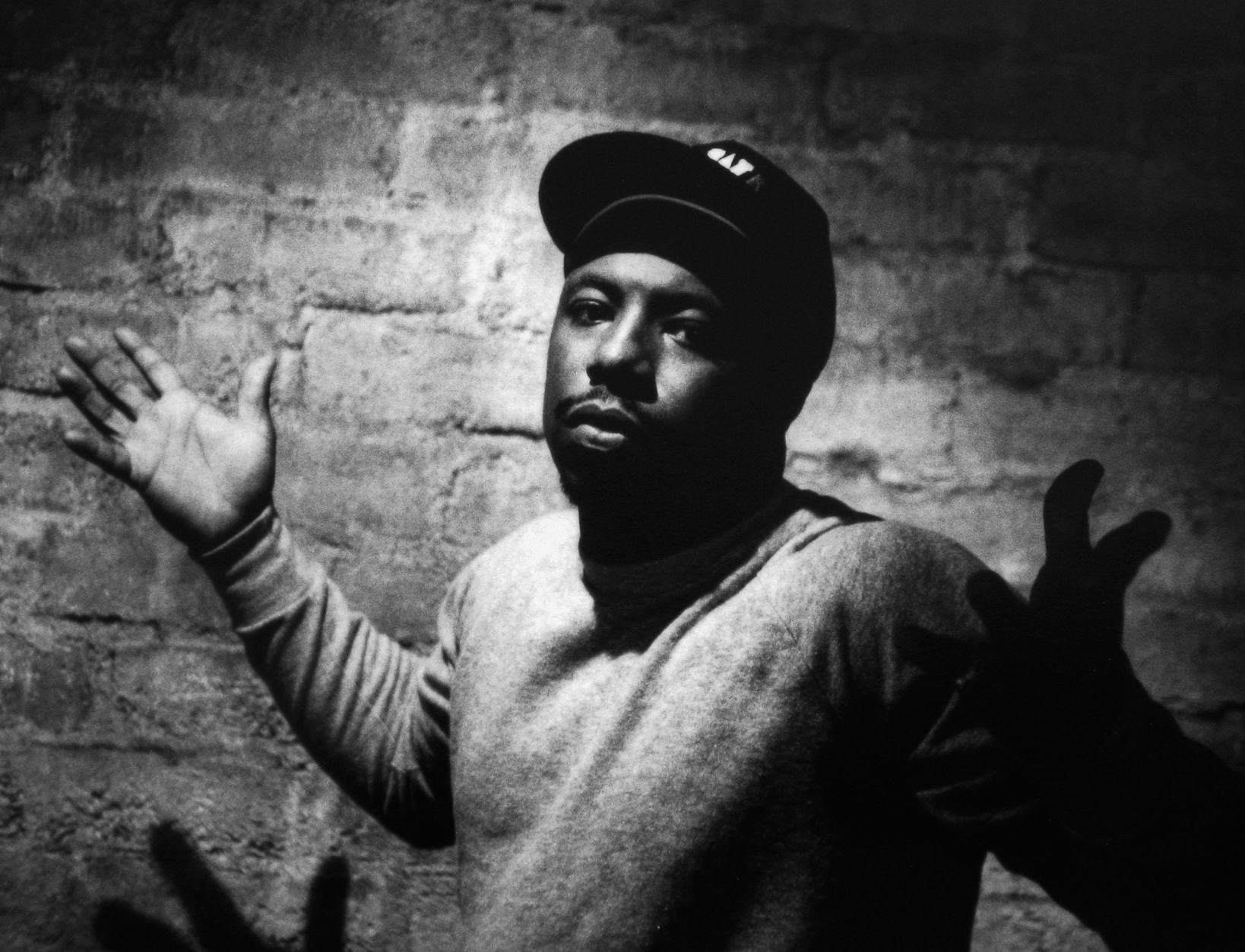
Lyricist/vocalist WC in Los Angeles 1989

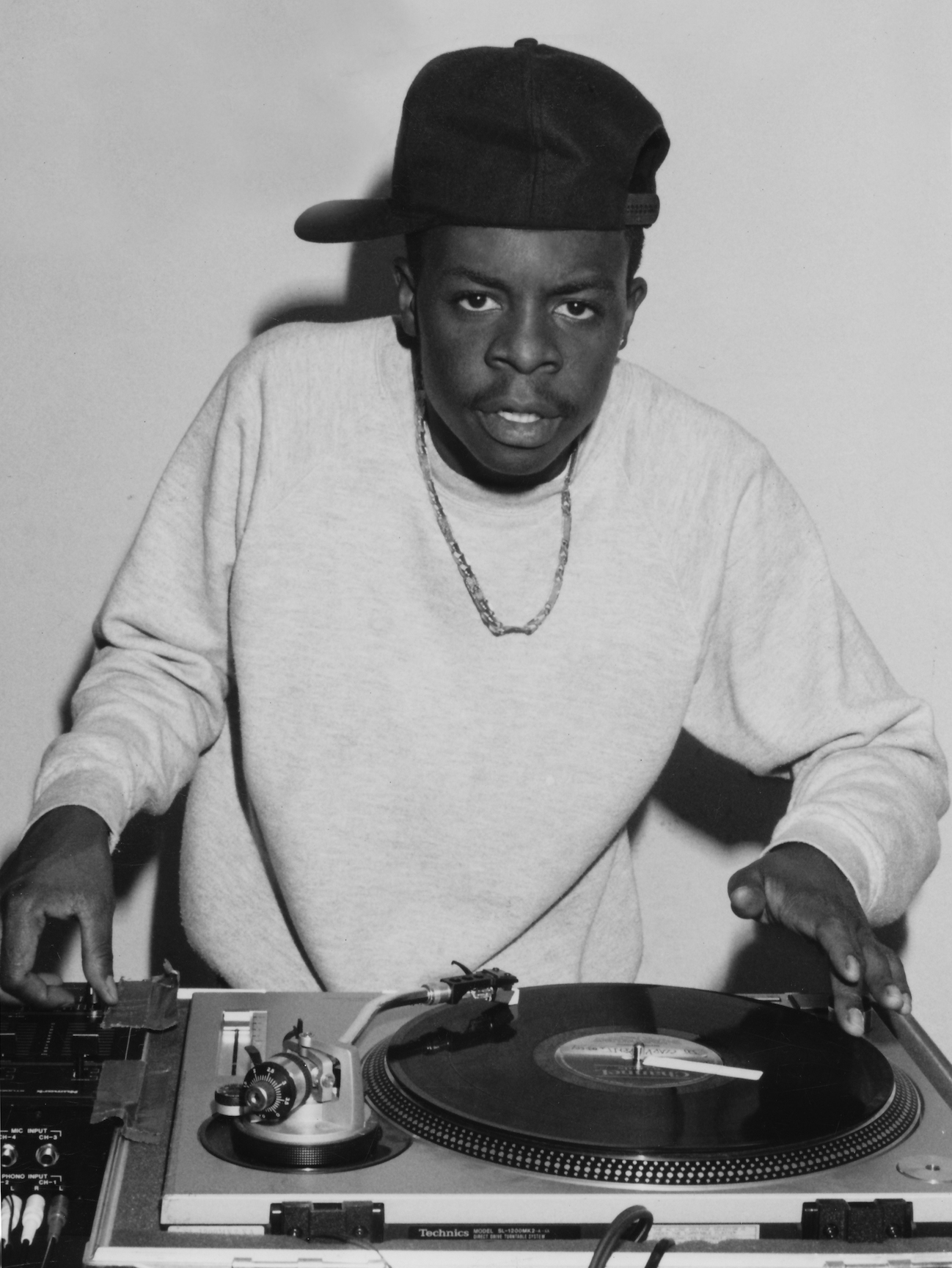
DJ Aladdin, Hollywood 1989

The group was a short-lived but influential West Coast hip-hop duo. Together, they released only album, We're in This Together. They also appeared on the Rhyme Syndicate compilation Rhyme Syndicate Comin' Through. DJ Aladdin began working with Ice-T, and WC formed a group called WC and the Maad Circle which included a then-unknown rapper named Coolio.

== Discography ==
Studio albums

- 1989 – We're in This Together (#66 on the Top R&B/Hip-Hop Albums)

Singles

- 1987 – "Hip Hop I Crave"
- 1989 – "Pay Ya Dues" (#8 on the Hot Rap Songs)
- 1990 – "Funky Song" (#87 on the Hot R&B/Hip-Hop Songs)
