= Journeys by DJ: 70 Minutes of Madness =

Journeys By DJ: Coldcut - 70 Minutes of Madness

Compilation album (DJ mix album) by Coldcut
- Released: 16 October 1995
- Genre: Electronica; dance; collage; jungle; electro; techno
- Length: 71:06
- Label: Music Unites
- Producer: Coldcut
- Compiler: Coldcut

Coldcut chronology
Tone Tales from Tomorrow (1994)	Journeys By DJ: Coldcut - 70 Minutes of Madness (1995)	Tone Tales from Tomorrow Too (1996)

Journeys by DJ: 70 Minutes of Madness is a DJ mix album by English electronic duo Coldcut, released on 16 October 1995. It was the eighth instalment in the Journeys by DJ series of mix albums released by the label of the same name. Unlike previous editions, which focused on house music, Coldcut's mix profiles the act's 'freestyle' mixing approach, blending 35 tracks that span many genres, including techno, hip hop, electro, jungle and funk, into an eclectic set.

Inspired by their Kiss FM radio series Solid Steel, Coldcut created Journeys by DJ: 70 Minutes of Madness with collaborators Kevin Foakes and Patrick Carpenter. The team were motivated to prove what could be achieved with a DJ mix and to exhibit true DJ culture. Licensing some songs proved difficult, resulting in several last minute replacements. The final mix incorporates rapid changes in tempo, spoken word samples, scratching and heavy layering.

On release, the album received wide critical acclaim for its diverse track selection, dextrous mixing and originality, becoming the best reviewed DJ mix album of the era. It has since been widely described as one of the greatest DJ mix albums ever released, featuring in lists compiled by Q, Spin, The Quietus and DJ Magazine. In 1998, it was named the best compilation album ever by Jockey Slut. It has also been cited as an influence on big beat and mashup music. Originally reaching number 41 on the UK Compilation Chart and falling out of print in 1998 following the expiration of the track licenses, Journeys by DJ was re-released in May 2002, allowing it to reach a new peak of number 28.

== Background ==
Launched in 1993 by London nightclub owner Tim Fielding and released via his label of the same name, Journeys by DJ were a series of dance-oriented DJ mix albums, inspired by the plethora of bootleg mix tapes on the black market but with all source material listed and officially licensed. It gave major DJs an opportunity to craft personalised set lists away from the pressure of one-take live club mixes, allowing them time to tweak their mixes. After seven volumes, all of which profiled popular house DJs, Journeys by DJ asked Coldcut – a duo of Matt Black and Jonathan More – to contribute a mix to the series. By this point, Coldcut were considered veterans, having four albums, numerous singles and multiple remixes. Dubbed 70 Minutes of Madness, the duo's entry to the series was a way to celebrate ownership of the name Coldcut returning to More and Black, as it had been in licensing limbo for several years following contractual problems with their former label Arista Records. Coldcut were assisted in creating the mix by their associates Kevin Foakes and Patrick Carpenter.

Coldcut's mix was rooted in Solid Steel, the London-based Kiss FM radio show that the duo had hosted since the late 1980s, which prioritised an improvised and diverse array of records and quick mixing; according to More, Coldcut sometimes persuaded Kiss's station manager to allow them into broadcasting DJ sets over two hours without advertisements, experiences which influenced the structure of the Journeys by DJ mix. Two pivotal influences on Coldcut's approach were Grandmaster Flash's "The Adventures of Grandmaster Flash on the Wheels of Steel" (1981) and Double Dee and Steinski's "Lessons 1–3" (1985), described by Foakes as "taking the best bits from everywhere and making them into something else. It didn't matter if there was some pop in there, like Junior or Culture Club, which generally I hated, but the fact that it was mixed in with all that other stuff... Bugs Bunny and Clint Eastwood." Black said that "Adventures" redefined his personal defections of "what a song could be like", while describing "The Lessons" as "very important, because they were actual lessons. This is how you can go about taking a bunch of old stuff and making it into something new."

== Recording ==
Coldcut approached their Journeys by DJ mix through what More described as a set of "random consequences", commenting that each contributor created his own section of sequenced tracks for the mix, including some that were "little routines that been honed at the club nights we used to run." Foakes said he added several ideas that he had practiced in the Solid Steel mixes and in clubs to the mix, such as "where the record gets turned down from 45rpm to 33rpm – that was one of my little club tricks to change the tempo." Black said that a competitive streak drove his contributions to the mix, believing that as audiences were satisfied "with so little", it was an opportunity to show them what could be achieved with a DJ mix and to exhibit "what DJ culture is actually about". Moreover, Black and Foakes commented that the mix was partly a reaction to the prevalence of house DJ mixes, with the former believing that house did not deserve to be "the only musical dish on the menu" and that the mix was an ideal opportunity to prove it. According to The Quietus journalist Joe Clay, DJ mix albums prior to 70 Minutes of Madness tended to be straightforward and linear, with records of the same genre and tempo mixed seamlessly, whereas Coldcut's approach on Journeys by DJ presented a break from the norm.

Coldcut and their collaborators pooled a list of records for inclusion, some of which they could not license. More and Black said they would mix first and only then seek permission, which affected the course of the production; the former commented that Sony refused to license Coldcut their own song "People Hold On", which Patrick had mixed with the Moody Boys' "Free". Similarly, Black said that Leftfield's "Original (Jam)" could not be licensed so the act placed Air Liquide on the mix instead. The mix was created in parts, resulting in what Black called it a "kind of a comment on the interface between DJing, mixing and studio production"; Foakes commented that the multilayering was achieved using ADAT, with computers only used for editing at the end of the process, while More says the act created alternate parts over two 40-minute ADATs which then had to be joined: "Kiss FM had got some computer editing software for radio and we copied the two sections from the ADAT and loaded them into the computer and joined it together. We did it up in the studios of Kiss." The album was mastered by David Turner.

== Composition ==
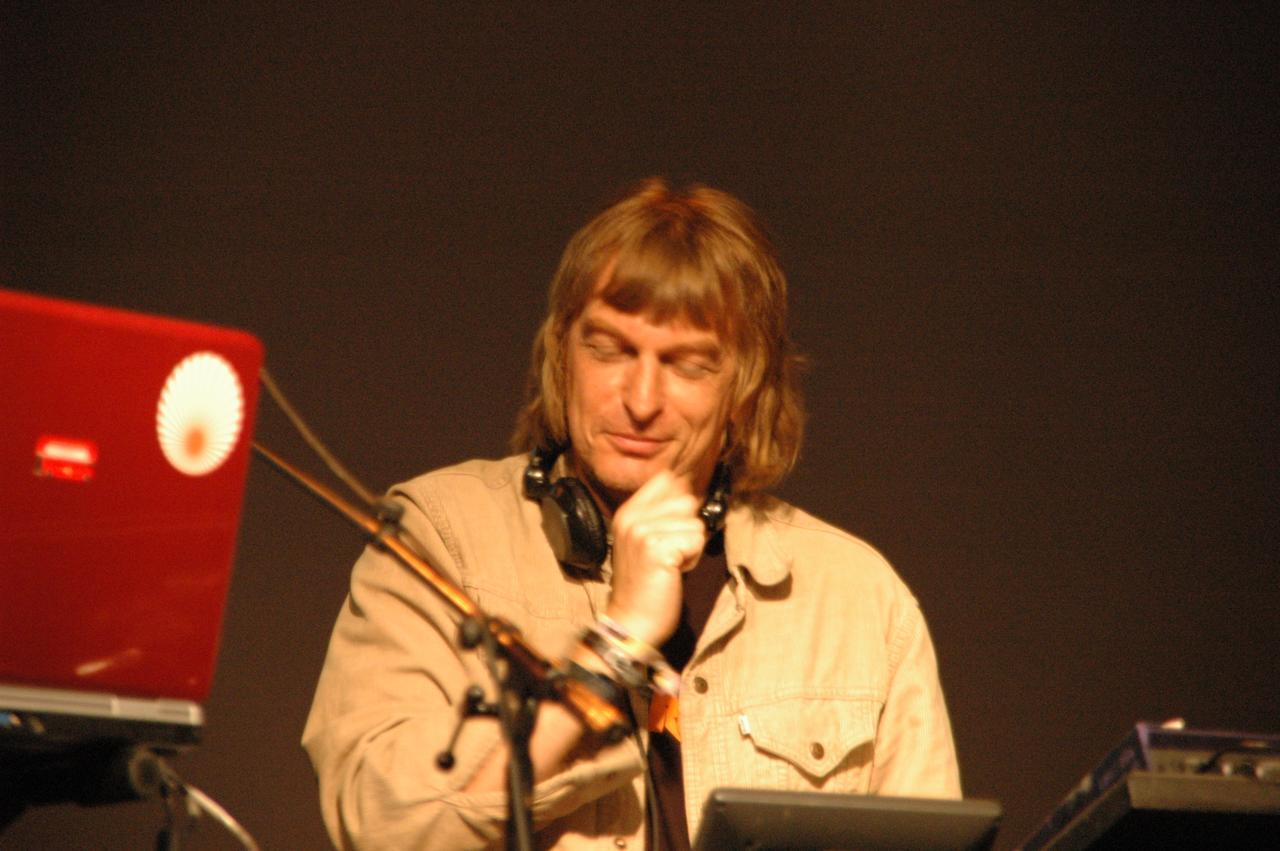
Matt Black of Coldcut (pictured 2006)

Journeys by DJ: 70 Minutes of Madness is structured similarly to Coldcut's cult Kiss FM shows and exhibits their 'freestyle' approach to mixing. A highly eclectic set comprising 35 tracks, the album incorporates a wide array of genres, including hip hop, electro, funk, techno, dub, breakbeat, drum and bass, jungle, ambient chill-out, house, reggae and jazz. The dense soundscape of the music is both layered and interrupted with an array of unusual spoken word samples, including from kung fu and martial arts films, The Jungle Book (1967), and Jello Biafra's vitriolic tirade "Message from Our Sponsor" (1987). The mix also incorporates scratching. A reviewer for Music Week said the album draws together "all manner of dub, hip hop and breakbeat styles. Mashed up dirty beats, bleepy noises, bits of soundtrack – it's all thrown in for an armchair rather than dancefloor experience." Gillett describes it as a "frenetic DJ mix", while ambient music historian Mark Prendergast calls it "a beat collage of various DJ recordings". (Note: A writer for Marylebone Mercury called it "more or less a compilation spanning the best part of a decade and effectively [chronicalling] the changes that dance music has taken during that time.")

Music writer Sean Cooper highlights the disparate artists, ranging "from Harold Budd to Dillinja, Joanna Law to the Jedi Knights", and the mix's rapid jumps between musical styles to draw connections "between hip-hop, jungle, techno, electro, ambient, and beyond". Music author Ed Gillett says it swerves deliriously "between jungle, acid techno, breakbeats and ambient interludes, layered with vocal samples salvaged from the dustbins of twentieth-century cultural ephemera," while critic Matt Cibula wrote how "abstract and ambient stuff like Plastikman and Harold Budd and Photek were considered equal partners with Mantronix and Queen Latifah and Masters at Work". Foakes highlights the mix's fair amount of contemporary material, such as music from Photek, which is mixed with Boogie Down Productions' "The Bridge Is Over". Commenting on the heavy amount of jungle and drum and bass, Foakes said that placing an a cappella from Junior Reid "over the top ... brings it out of just being jungle."

The mix employs the technique of fusing unrelated songs to create new ones, described by Clay as early examples of mashups; More believes that Brian Eno and David Byrne's My Life in the Bush of Ghosts (1981) pioneered the technique and that its "DNA seeped into our work because we’re such big fans." Journeys by DJ is not a particularly seamless mix; on some occasions, the tempo slows down for one or two short tracks and then returns to 120bpm, with segues seeming smooth "probably because there were at least two or three sounds continuing on at every transition", according to Cibula, who notes that new tracks are introduced just as the previous one has registered. The tracks are generally shortened, although some play to a longer length, as with Boogie Down Productions' "The Bridge Is Over", which plays at a faster tempo while being layered with ambient keyboards and birdlike sounds.

The album begins with the words "This is a journey." Spoken by actor Geoffrey Sumner and lifted from a 1958 stereo sound demonstration LP, the sample continues that the journey "will bring to you new colour, new dimension, new values, and a new experience", before, as Gillett describes, "his voice echoes away into nothingness, and the beat drops." The first track is Philorene's "Bola", mixed in with Depth Charge's "Depth Charge", a piece of dub hip hop whose prominent beats and unusual effects set the tone for the album. Junior Reid's "One Blood" is played over Roni Size-style beats and is in turn segued into a dub mix of Newcleus' "Jam on It", which then switches to a hard glitch remix of 2 Player's "Extreme Possibilities". Among later contrasts, Ron Grainer's Doctor Who theme music (1963) plays besides the 1990s dub of the Moody Boys, while Biafra's piece, a protest against fascism in the United States, is sequenced between Hookian Mindz' ambient track "Freshmess" and the "beat freneticism" of Pressure Drop's "Unify". Some inclusions pay homage to Coldcut's 1980s hip hop roots, such as selections from Boogie Down Productions and Mantronix.

== Release ==
Journeys by DJ: 70 Minutes of Madness was released on 16 October 1995 through Journeys by DJ and its distributor Music Unites. It was the eighth edition in the Journeys by DJ series, and spelled the end of a long hiatus for Coldcut. The subtitle, 70 Minutes of Madness, is a reference to Coldcut's 1987 genre-fusing remix of Eric B. & Rakim's "Paid in Full", which was subtitled "Seven Minutes of Madness". The liner notes dedicate the recording to William Burroughs, Double Dee and Steinski, Grandmaster Flash and other "cut and paste" pioneers. Journeys by DJ spent five non-consecutive weeks on the UK Compilation Chart, peaking at number 41 in October 1995 and initially making its final appearance in January 1996.

The album was deleted in 1998 after the track licenses expired, by which point the album had become a "modern classic". Demand for a re-release followed but it took four years to renegotiate the track licenses. Journeys by DJ was re-released by the label of the same name on 28 May 2002, following an event celebrating the reissue at London nightclub The End on 18 May. Laurence Windo, writing in Music Week, wrote that "all the buyers are after it and as a result the sell-in has been phenomenal and it should chart well." The re-release reached number 28 on the UK Compilation Chart. It also peaked at number two on the American CMJ RPM airplay chart for electronic music and ranked 28th in its year-end chart.

== Critical reception ==
Professional ratings
Review scores
Source	Rating
AllMusic	5/5 stars
Encyclopedia of Popular Music	4/5 stars
The Guardian	4/5 stars
Mixmag	10/10
Music Week	5/5 stars
Muzik	5/5 stars
Resident Advisor	5/5 stars
The Sydney Morning Herald	4/5 stars
The Village Voice	(choice cut)

On release, Journeys by DJ: 70 Minutes of Madness received widespread acclaim from music critics, which Foakes attributes to there being "nothing else like it out there. It was existing at number one in a field of one." It has been described as the most acclaimed DJ mix album of its time.

For Muzik, Calvin Bush wrote that the album proved that "you don't have to be a high bpm DJ to rock da crowd", highlighting the "breathtaking" variety of sounds as "one in the eye" for DJs who barely change tempos within a set, and writing that a "new wave of sound" emerges as the tracks begin blurring into "one delirious mindfuck of funk". He concluded that it was possibly "the best mix CD ever" and motivation to move to London to hear Coldcut's Solid Steel show. Paul Mathur of Melody Maker called it an eclectic mix of classic tracks that "whizzes along like a turbo-charged Chitty Chitty Bang Bang at Brands Hatch", with a track selection that avoids genericism. He noted the inclusion of both seminal records and more unexpected choices which "demonstrate the vivaciousness of a little imagination", such as Junior Reid's "One Blood", Ron Grainer's "Theme from Doctor Who" and Jello Biafra's "A Message From Our Sponsor", believing the latter to be Biafra's first appearance on a dance compilation.

The Guardian critic Adam Sweeting wrote that the mix proceeds in a similar manner to the Future Sound of London's set ISDN (1995), albeit "far more focussed, the contrast of stunningly original melodies and rhythms with elegantly electric cut-up samples evolving into a riveting kind of dancefloor dialectic." He praised the album for exceeding expectations as a "kaleidoscopic summation" of Coldcut's career to date. Shane Danielson of The Sydney Morning Herald wrote that it organises 35 disparate tracks into a "single, cohesive listening experience, with all the peaks and troughs, the rapid liner imperative, of a normal album." He expressed surprised that it works, calling the effect "dizzying, a sound collage of immense diversity and power", and concluded: "With a sterling list of contributors, and some hard-to-find, well chosen material, this is exhilarating – like 70 minutes in the best club." The North Wales Weekly News critic Darren Parry considered it far superior to other recent Journeys by DJ editions, eschewing their handbag and hard house flavours for an eclectic 'freestyle' mix that proves that "music needn't be bound by category." Less favourably, The Village Voice reviewer Robert Christgau described DJ Food's "The Dusk" as a "choice cut", indicating "a good song on an album that isn't worth your time or money".

In their year-end lists of the best albums of 1995, Journeys by DJ was ranked eighth by Mixmag, and 35th by Melody Maker. Reviewing the 2002 issue, CMJ New Music Monthly reviewer Justin Kleinfeld wrote that it blended hip-hop, funk, techno and drum and bass into "one rule-breaking (or rule-defining, depending on how you look at it) mix" that "helped revolutionize the DJ's role as music sculptor". He wrote that it "still manages to remain fresh" and praised the placement of Joanna Law's "First Time Ever I Saw Your Face" between tracks by Raphael Corderdos and Photek as the mix's greatest and most unexpectable moment. Spin writer Will Hermes described it as Coldcut's "seltzer-shpritizing 1995 manifesto, an information-highway pileup of jungle, electro, techno and stoner beats". Sean Cooper of AllMusic named it an "Album Pick", commenting that although only some of the tracks are by Coldcut, the mix amply demonstrates the "freestyle approach to composition" that the duo popularised, writing that they draw out connections between a diverse array of electronic genres "with first-rate mixing and turntable work".

Writing for Resident Advisor, DJ Robotek wrote that, on its original release, 70 Minutes of Madness "redefined the DJ mixed CD with its unique blend of hip hop, drum'n'bass, techno and whatever else you can think of thrown into a tight coherent mix", and advised readers to buy a copy before it became deleted again. Matt Cibula of PopMatters was "completely flummoxed and bewildered" by the mix, as, through the depth of its variety and excessive use of sampling, it "basically just rewrote the rules of the game." He praised the intensity of Coldcut's sacrificing of "flow for diversity" which still did not leave listeners feeling "jerked around", and concluded that it was "probably the greatest mix disc ever". The Wire included the re-release in their list of the ten best reissues of 2002. Peter Shapiro of Rough Guides calls it Coldcut's best album and "easily the best commercially available mix compilation", recommending it to those who have "never experienced a DJ epiphany".

== Legacy ==
Journeys by DJ: 70 Minutes of Madness is widely considered to be one of the greatest DJ mix albums ever. Some publications, such as CMJ New Music Monthly and Resident Advisor, comment that many deem it to be the greatest DJ mix album ever released. Clay writes that this accolade is widely shared among music fans, adding that the mix "redefined what a DJ mix should be, perfectly capturing the cut & paste ethic of the mid-90s in the process, while arguably inventing what became the pop mash-up." Dorian Lynskey of The Guardian said it "remains the standard by which all DJ mix albums are judged", while his colleague Tony Naylor called it a "legendary", game-changing DJ mix and "a Damascene moment, a shocking illustration of just how boring mainstream, mid-90s dance music had become." Others, such as Andrew Club of The Age and Chris Mugan of The Independent comment that 70 Minutes of Madness was a milestone in the history of mix albums. (Note: The Observer listed it alongside Leftfield's Leftism, Tricky's Maxinquaye and Goldie's "Inner City Life" as pivotal examples of 1995 British dance music.)

According to Clay, part of the record's stature is earned by a lack of comparable releases, saying that, "with the exception of the Radio Soulwax series and some of the more accomplished deck technicians operating in the hip-hop sphere (Format, Cut Chemist, Shadow etc), nothing and nobody has come close. It is as distinctive in its sound as an artist album; a painstakingly created work of art, but sounding fresh, spontaneous and loose." Chicago Reader writer Michelangelo Matos contends that early 1990s DJ mix albums were often "snapshots" rather than "the kind of portraits more ambitious DJs began creating in the mid-90s", believing that Coldcut's Journeys by DJ "remains a model for many: with its style hopping and obvious edits and drop-ins, it develops like a canvas being painted. Indeed, it's regarded more highly than Coldcut's studio albums." American musician Keith Fullerton Whitman said that Journeys by DJ was his favourite "dance music mix-tape" through the late 1990s and early 2000s. Discussing the mix's impact in 2010, David Taylor of The Independent said that it is "still (rightfully) held in high esteem by anyone who has ever attempted to mix."

The Independent have described Journeys by DJ: 70 Minutes of Madness as a major influence on big beat, a genre pioneered by Coldcut. According to Cooper, the album was credited with helping increase attention to the style of freestyle mixing that Coldcut exhibited on Solid Steel and club performances, a style which "later took off through clubs like Blech and the Heavenly Sunday Social." Kleinfeld contends that, despite being what the Journeys by DJ label is best remembered for, the album may have had a negative effect on the label, saying that while Coldcut's mix put the Journeys by DJ series "on the map", subsequent editions did not match the "legendary status" of the duo's mix. In a review of Coldcut's subsequent album Sound Mirrors (2006), Jess Harvell of Pitchfork referred to Journeys by DJ as "the most overrated DJ mix of all time". Despite enjoying the album, Stylus Magazine's Scott Plagenhoef criticised several of the spoken samples for their "trip-hop/marijuana trappings", and overall preferred 2ManyDJs' more upbeat As Heard on Radio Soulwax Pt. 2 (2002), and the work of DJ /rupture.

More commented on the lack of a Coldcut follow-up to Journeys by DJ: 70 Minutes of Madness in 2015, saying that although the option remained open, the original "was an outpouring of creativity and energy that would be hard to replicate", while Black commented: "On one level it's like, we did it. We made the statement. We don't need to do it again." However, Black believes that Coldcut Presents 2 Hours of Sanity Part 1: Love (2013) "picks up where Journeys by DJ left off", citing his intention to make a complex, layered mix of experimental music that "raised the bar again". Robotek writes that the Journeys by DJ mix inspired Coldcut to create their subsequent mix Cold Krush Cuts (1997) and cites it as the inspiration for DJ Ransom's Physics of Freestyle mixes (2000).

=== Accolades ===
As Nick Gordon Brown of online zine Defected writes, Coldcut's Journeys by DJ frequently features in lists of classic DJ mix albums, alongside Sasha and John Digweed's Renaissance: The Mix Collection (1994). Publications who included it in their list of the best DJ mix albums include Q (in 1997), Spin (in 2001), DJ Magazine (in 2014), and The Quietus (in 2015). In 1996, Spin also included it in their 20-album history of electronica; contributor Neil Strauss wrote that DJ mixes spotlight "one of electronic's (and this century's) important art forms: the collage", with Coldcut's record notable for profiling their own history of electronica, incorporating science-fiction snippets, electro-funk, techno and jungle. In 1998, it topped Jockey Slut's list of the greatest compilations of all time.

The Guardian included the album in their 2007 list of "1,000 albums to hear before you die", one of four DJ mix albums to feature. The publication wrote that the album "seemed fresh and unique" among the saturated marketplace for DJ mix albums in the mid-1990s, and "still does", deeming it a "musical sum greater than its parts – which included hip-hop, techno, Harold Budd and Jello Biafra". It features in The Mojo Collection (2007), a list of the 1,000 greatest albums ever as chosen by Mojo magazine; the authors deemed it "the great album Grandmaster Flash and Double D and Steinski never made." The album has been listed among the best or most classic releases from the Ninja Tune stable by The Independent, New Zealand Herald and Generation Ecstasy author Simon Reynolds. Trip hop historian R.J. Wheaton names it one of ten essential albums in the fields of cut-ups and hip hop collage.

== Track listing ==
Journeys by DJ: 70 Minutes of Madness
No.	Title	Writer(s)	Artist	Length
1.	"Bola / Depth Charge"	David Barratt, Elliott Sharp	Philomera / Depth Charge	3:18
2.	"Street Beats Vol 2" (produced by Rupert Parkes)	Rupert Parkes	The Truper	3:01
3.	"One Blood"	Junior Reid	Junior Reid	2:24
4.	"Jam on Revenge (The Wikki Wikki Song)" (produced by Joe Webb)	M B Canac	Newcleus	1:11
5.	"Extreme Possibilities (Wagon Christ Remix)" (produced by Jon Tye)	Jon Tye, Daniel Pemberton	2 Player	1:08
6.	"King Ashabanapal (Dillinja Mix)" (produced by Funki Porcini)	Funky Porcini	Funky Porcini	1:35
7.	"Noddy Holder"	Mark Pritchard, Tom Middleton	Jedi Knights	2:53
8.	"Fuk"	Richie Hawtin	Plastikman	1:08
9.	"Mo Beats" (produced by Floormaster Squeeze)	Matt Black, Jonathan More	Coldcut	1:16
10.	"Manganese in Deep Violet" (produced by Bedouin Ascent)	Kingsuk Biswas	Bedouin Ascent	1:58
11.	"African Drug" (produced by Bob Holroyd)	Bob Holroyd	Bob Holroyd	3:13
12.	"Stratus Static" (produced by Air Liquide)	M.S. Applegate	Air Liquide	1:55
13.	"Beats and Pieces" (produced by Kickmaster Squeeze)	Matt Black, Jonathan More	Coldcut	1:47
14.	"Greedy Beat" (produced by Cold)	Matt Black, Jonathan More	Coldcut	1:23
15.	"Music Maker" (produced by Coldcut)	Matt Black, Jonathan More	Coldcut	1:07
16.	"Find a Way (Acapella)" (produced by Coldcut)	Matt Black, Jonathan More, Owen	Coldcut	1:18
17.	"King of the Beats" (produced by Mantronix)		Mantronix	1:56
18.	"Mag" (produced by Sean Booth, Robert Brown, A Maddocs)	Sean Booth, Robert Brown, A Maddocs	Gescom	3:02
19.	"Justa "Lil" Dope" (produced by Kenny Gonzalez, Louie Vega)	Kenny Gonzalez, Louie Vega	Masters at Work	1:39
20.	"Parp 1 / Rock Creak"		Raphael Corderdos	0:40
21.	"Grace"		Luke Slater's 7th Plain	1:01
22.	"First Time Ever I Saw Your Face (Acapella)" (produced by The Funky Ginger)		Joanna Law	2:07
23.	"Balthus Bemused by Color"		Harold Budd	1:57
24.	"Into the '90s" (produced by Photek)	Photek	Photek	1:59
25.	"The Bridge Is Over" (produced by Dwayne Sumal)	Lawrence Parker, Scott La Rock	BDP	2:49
26.	"Dark Blood (MLO "Nu Blud Two" Mix)"	Matt Black, Jonathan More	DJ Food	0:20
27.	"Friendly Pressure (Acapella)" (produced by Lee Hamblin)	Jhelisa, Lee Hamblin	Jhelisa	2:38
28.	"Freshmess (Bandulu Mix)" (produced by Remi Adelaja)	Remi Adelaja	Hookian Minds	0:11
29.	"Message from Our Sponsor"		Jello Biafra	2:21
30.	"Unify" (produced by Blood Brothers)	Blood Brothers, B. Amos	Pressure Drop	1:57
31.	"Again Son" (produced by Tim Lee)	Tim Lee	Love Lee	2:17
32.	"Hot Flush (Sabres of Paradise Remix)" (produced by Red Snapper)	Red Snapper	Red Snapper	4:05
33.	"Theme from Dr Who"		Ron Grainer	1:26
34.	"Free" (produced by Tony Thorpe and Jimmy Cauty)	Moody Boys	Moody Boys	2:27
35.	"The Dusk"	Matt Black, Jonathan More, Brook	DJ Food	5:19
Total length:				71:06

== Personnel ==
Adapted from the liner notes of Journeys by DJ: 70 Minutes of Madness

- Coldcut – DJ mix
- PC – performer ("aided & abetted")
- Strictly – performer ("aided & abetted")
- Jo Beckett – coordinator
- Tim Fielding – coordinator
- David Turner @ Tape to Tape – mastering
- Openmind – design, artwork remix
- Suzi Green – original photography

== Charts ==
Chart performance for Journeys by DJ: 70 Minutes of Madness
Chart (1995–2002)	Peak position
CMJ RPM (2002 reissue)	2
UK Compilation Chart	41
UK Compilation Chart (2002 reissue)	28
