= Levi 167 =

American hip-hop artist

Jerry Levi, better known by the stage name Levi 167, was an early hip-hop figure. Along with KRS-One and Scott La Rock, he was a member of the groups Scott La Rock and The Celebrity Three and 12:41. He was also part of the "Boogie Down Crew" (precursor to Boogie Down Productions) and recorded a solo 12-inch single for B-Boy Records.

== Career ==
Levi, a "former graffiti artist turned MC", met KRS-One and La Rock at the Franklin Armory Men's Shelter on 166th Street in the Bronx, where KRS-One resided and La Rock was a social worker. The three began recording together, first (along with MC Quality) as Scott La Rock and The Celebrity Three (releasing the anti-nuclear-war song "Advance") and then as 12:41 – a name derived from the time they finished recording their single, "Success is the Word". That song, which incorporated the melody and samples from the television show Gilligan's Island, was rejected by radio DJ Mr. Magic for his WBLS show Rap Attack, an event that would become an inciting incident in The Bridge Wars, one of the earliest hip-hop feuds.

Following legal problems with their label, the group broke up and Levi, La Rock, and KRS-One were released from their contract. In 1987, Levi recorded two songs under his own name for B-Boy Records: "Something Fresh To Swing To" and "The Other Side."

Levi was also part of the original "Boogie Down Crew", described by KRS-One as "really more like a gang". In addition to KRS-One, MC Quality, and La Rock, the group included Just Ice, ICU, Castle D, and Ms. Melodie, among others. This group later evolved, without Levi, into Boogie Down Productions.

== Legacy ==
Peter Shapiro described Levi 167's "Something Fresh To Swing To" as among "the best" releases from B-Boy Records, praising in particular its "punishing drum beat buffeted by metallic gusts that sound like the DJ is scratching with buzzsaw blades". KRS-One later sampled the song in "KRS-One Attacks" from his 1993 debut solo album Return of the Boom Bap. The B-side to "Something Fresh..." – aptly-titled "The Other Side" – was named by DJ Premier as one of his favorite "underacknowledged Hip Hop cuts".

== Discography ==
- Scott La Rock and The Celebrity Three, "Advance" (Street Beat Records, 1985)
- 12:41, "Success is the Word" (Fresh Records, 1985)
- Levi 167, "Something Fresh to Swing To" / "The Other Side" (B-Boy Records, 1987)
