= B-Boy Records =

American independent hip hop record label

- Parent company: Phase One Network
- Founded: 1986
- Founder: Jack Allen, William Kamarra, Ray Wilson
- Distributor(s): Traffic Entertainment
- Genre: Hip hop
- Country of origin: United States
- Location: New York City, New York

B-Boy Records was an American independent hip hop record label founded in 1986 by Jack Allen and William Kamarra, in the Bronx, New York City. Its most notable signing, Boogie Down Productions, released the singles “South Bronx” (1986) and “The Bridge Is Over” (1987), and the landmark album Criminal Minded (1987). Other artists included JVC Force, Cold Crush Brothers, Sparky D, Levi 167, and Jewel T. The label’s music blended new and veteran artists, capturing a shift from drum-machine-driven tracks to sampler-based hip hop with horns and drums, while lyrics began detailing street life. B-Boy Records closed in 1988. Nate Patrin of Pitchfork notes that Allen and Kamarra attempted to revive the label independently, straining their partnership.

== Foundation ==
Jack Allen and William Kamarra established B-Boy Records in 1986 with one act. Operating as Rock Candy Records and Filmworks with Ray Wilson, they advertised in a newspaper for new musical talent. Rumors suggested the label was a front for a pornography business. Boogie Down Productions responded to the ad, recording an anti-drug song, “Crack Attack,” and signed with the new label. KRS-One, the group’s lead emcee, designed the label’s graffiti-style logo.

== Notable releases ==
B-Boy’s first release, “South Bronx” (1986) by Boogie Down Productions, was an oral history of hip hop responding to MC Shan’s “The Bridge,” fueling the Bridge Wars and gaining significant attention in New York. During that period, KRS-One, technically homeless, lived in a meat freezer below the label’s offices. The track, like many B-Boy releases, featured noisy, minimalist drum-machine hip hop, as seen in The Brothers’ “I Got Rhythm,” Wax Master Torey’s “Duck Season,” Jewel T’s “I Like It Loud,” and Levi 167’s “Something Fresh to Swing To” (all 1987). By contrast, Castle D’s “Just Saying Fresh Rhymes” (1987) used a quieter hi-hat-based percussion and a disorienting synth melody, reminiscent of G-funk. Sampler-influenced 1987 releases include The Busy Boys’ “Classical", Cold Crush Brothers’ “Feel the Horns,” and Sparky D’s “Throwdown.”After releasing Criminal Minded (1987), Boogie Down Productions planned to sign with Warner Bros. Records, and B-Boy folded soon after. Writer Peter Shapiro highlights Levi 167’s 1987 single as the label’s best release outside Boogie Down Productions. The label achieved late success with JVC Force’s “Strong Island” (1988), which Shapiro calls “one of the most kinetic records in hip-hop history.” After Scott La Rock’s murder, Boogie Down Productions signed with Jive Records.

== Retrospectives ==
Traffic Entertainment Group, under license from Phase One Network Inc., controls B-Boy Records’ discography. Retrospectives include The Best of B-Boy Records (2002) and Boogie Down Productions’ Best of B-Boy Records (2001). In 2007, Traffic released the two-disc B-Boy Records: The Archives Rare & Unreleased. In 2008, the four-disc B-Boy Records: The Masterworks featured acts such as Soul Dimension, Incredible Two, Crazy 8 Posse, Wacky Rapper, Spyder-D (of “Big Apple Rappin'” fame), and B Girls Live and Kicking (1987), showcasing female MCs Sparky D, Five Star Moet, Baby Doll, and L.A. Star. A planned Boogie Down Productions track, “Gotta-Rock” (G-Supreme & K-Rakeem), was abandoned after Scott La Rock’s death. Nate Patrin of Pitchfork observes that B-Boy’s recordings mark the rise of independent, street-level hardcore rap lyricism during a shift from 808 drum machines to SP1200 samplers. He describes the roster as a mix of “past icons, future legends, could-have-beens, never-weres, and several acts that shone briefly in a single 12-inch record".

== See also ==
- Music of New York City

== Bibliography ==
- Coleman, Brian (2007). Check the Technique. New York: Villard. pp. 80–84. ISBN 978-0-8129-7775-2.
