= Best of B-Boy Records =

Compilation album by Boogie Down Productions
- Released: May 8, 2001
- Genre: Hip hop; East Coast hip hop; golden age hip hop; political hip hop
- Label: B-Boy; Landspeed
- Producer: Boogie Down Productions

Boogie Down Productions chronology
Sex and Violence (1992)	Best of B-Boy Records (2001)

KRS-One chronology
The Sneak Attack (2001)	Best of B-Boy Records (2001)	Spiritual Minded (2002)

Professional ratings
Review scores
Source	Rating
AllMusic	3/5 stars
The Rolling Stone Album Guide	4/5 stars

Best of B-Boy Records is a compilation album by hip-hop group Boogie Down Productions consisting of recordings for its first label, B-Boy Records. It is the final release to date by KRS-One under the Boogie Down Productions name. Best of B-Boy Records is essentially a repackaging of BDP's debut album, Criminal Minded, with several b-sides and singles added.

== Track listing ==
1. "Poetry"
2. "South Bronx"
3. "9mm Goes Bang"
4. "Word from Our Sponsor"
5. "Elementary"
6. "Dope Beat"
7. "P is Free (Remix)"
8. "The Bridge is Over"
9. "Super-Hoe"
10. "Criminal Minded"
11. "P is Free (Original)"
12. "Advance"
13. "D-Nice Rocks the House"
14. "Say No, Brother (Crack Don't Do It)"
15. "Criminal Minded (Red Alert Mega Mix)"
