= Kool DJ Red Alert =

American DJ (born 1956)

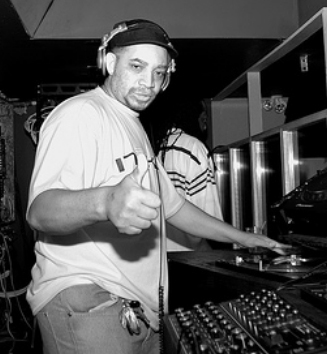
- Kool Red Alert in 2004

Background information
- Also known as: Red, Uncle Red, The BUM, The Koolest Legend, The Propmaster
- Born: Frederick Crute; November 27, 1956 (age 69); Antigua, West Indies
- Origin: New York City, U.S.
- Occupation: Disc jockey
- Years active: 1976–2026
- Website: http://www.legendarykooldjredalert.com

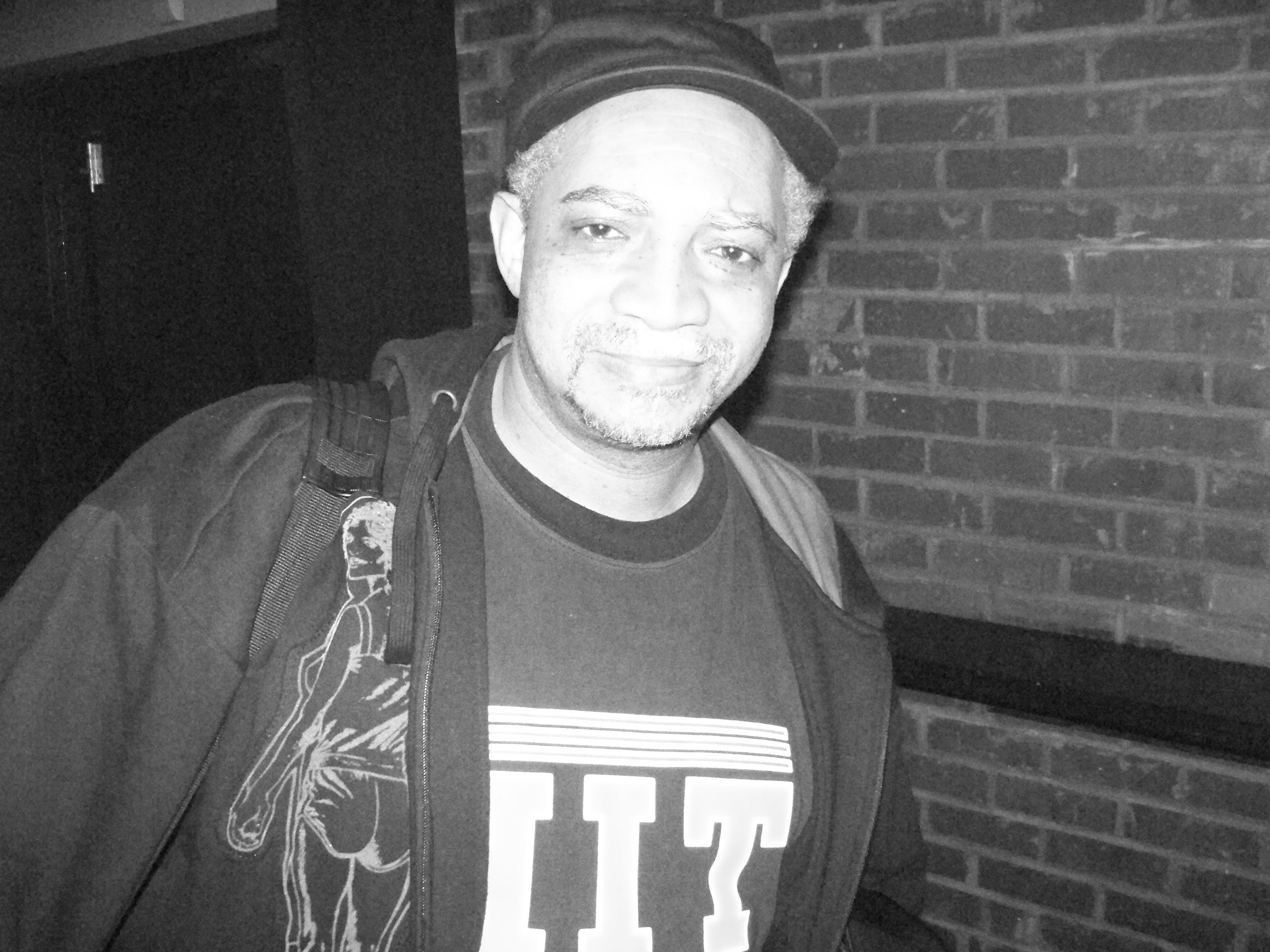
Kool DJ Red Alert in Atlanta, Georgia, in March 2008

Frederick Crute (born November 27, 1956), known professionally as Kool DJ Red Alert, is an Antiguan-American retired disc jockey who rose to fame on WRKS 98.7 Kiss FM in New York City and is recognized as one of the founding fathers of hip hop music and culture. His weekly radio show airs on WBLS 107.5 FM from Monday to Saturday at 6pm EST.

Red Alert is one of the first deejays to perform with the architects of hip hop Universal Zulu Nation. He built his radio show's fanbase by shouting out to listeners within the Tri-State area. Red Alert has been noted for breaking in such acts and artists as A Tribe Called Quest, Queen Latifah, and Black Sheep. Red Alert played a vital role in both The Roxanne Wars and The Bridge Wars, two of the first major hip-hop feuds. Red Alert's legend grew immensely after he broke the record South Bronx by Boogie Down Productions on his KISS-FM weekend radio show.

Red Alert holds the all-time record for the most guest appearances among all hip hop artists and personalities in the history of music video. When the cassette tapes gained popularity in the 1970s, Red Alert was the first disc jockey to record mix compilation albums, which were later known as mixtapes. He also was the first mixshow disc jockey to introduce dancehall to mainstream radio on his KISS 98.7 FM during the mid 1980s.

== Personal background and career ==
Kool DJ Red Alert was born in Antigua, West Indies and grew up in Harlem, New York City. As he attended public school located next to iconic basketball court Rucker Park, he was given his nickname "Red Alert" as a teenager for his natural reddish hair, and for his "alert" sense on defense when playing basketball. He later attended and graduated from DeWitt Clinton High School in The Bronx. At age nineteen, he began attending Thursday and Friday night parties in downtown New York City. He was influenced by dance/disco deejay pioneers Grandmaster Flowers, Pete DJ Jones, and The Together Brothers, and radio personalities Frankie Crocker and Ken "Spider" Webb. On Saturday nights, he acquired the sounds of hip hop from the neighboring uptown borough The Bronx via DJ Kool Herc. Later on, Red would also attend parties, witnessing deejay sets from Grandmaster Flash, Kool DJ A.J., and Afrika Bambaataa, though his favorite was Grand Wizzard Theodore. His allure was for the deejay's acute ability to blend vinyl records on two sets of turntables with ideal songs that had tempos and rhythms to keep the dancing crowd moving. He would soon after assemble his own record collection and gathered deejaying equipment.

Red Alert taught the basics of deejaying to his cousin Jazzy Jay, a fellow pioneering Universal Zulu Nation member. Jazzy Jay in return introduced Red to Afrika Bambaataa, the founding member and most exalted deejay of the Universal Zulu Nation. Red Alert would eventually become a fellow Zulu member, along with the likes of other early Zulu deejays Afrika Islam and Grandmixer D.ST, and emcees The Soulsonic Force. Afrika Bambaataa added to the young Red Alert's wisdom regarding the value of keeping a non-judgemental approach to exploring various genres of music, including rock, reggae, disco, and new wave.

The teenage Crute graduated high school as a top-ranking basketball prospect, and earned a full athletic scholarship to attend Hampton University in 1976. After attending a total of three semesters, Red dropped out of Hampton University and returned home to Harlem to become a full-time deejay for Afrika Bambaataa and performed throughout The Bronx, Long Island, Connecticut and New Jersey. In the early 1980s, Bambaataa would bring the sounds of hip hop to downtown New York City in legendary New York nightclubs Danceteria, Negril, and The Roxy.

While deejaying at The Roxy in 1982, Red Alert met Barry Mayo, the WRKS 98.7 Kiss FM Program Director. Mayo was impressed by Red's deejay abilities and on Afrika Bambaataa's recommendation, Mayo hired Red Alert to host the station's "KISS Master Mix Party" show starting in October 1983, making Red Alert the third Zulu-affiliated deejay to host the show, after Afrika Islam and Jazzy Jay. Red Alert worked the first three months without getting paid, doing a show every other week, alternating with Tony Humphries.

Red Alert played an important role in two of the first major hip-hop feuds: The Roxanne Wars and The Bridge Wars, notably in both cases on the side opposite his radio deejay rival Mr. Magic and the Juice Crew. For two years Red Alert deejayed for Sparky D, whose track "Sparky's Turn (Roxanne, You're Through)" was a response to Roxanne Shante of the Juice Crew's "Roxanne's Revenge" and blew the Roxanne Wars wide open. Red Alert helped ignite The Bridge Wars by breaking the Boogie Down Productions (BDP) track "South Bronx" on his radio show. The track was a direct response to MC Shan of the Juice Crew's "The Bridge," produced by Marley Marl. Red Alert would also do club gigs with BDP in support of their rivalry against the Juice Crew and later toured with BDP after the death of Scott La Rock in 1987, though as a hype man rather than as a DJ.

Red Alert became KISS' top deejay. He built his fame and expanded his name recognition via mixtapes that were bootlegged amongst his fans within the Tri-state area who recorded his radio show, and eventually worldwide with the Universal Zulu Nation and the Rock Steady Crew. His only full-time hired colleague for the station's other hip hop shows was fellow pioneering deejay Chuck Chillout. After over 11 years at KISS-FM, and the 1994 corporate sale from KISS-FM's parent company Summit Communications to rival Emmis Communications, and KISS-FM's re-branding to an "R&B and Classic Soul" format, Red was transitioned to New York City's next arbiters of hip hop and R&B Hot 97 in December 1994. He would deejay two timeslots called The Twelve O'Clock Old School At Noon Mix and The Five O'Clock Free Ride for the next seven years. After a brief return to KISS-FM from 2001 to 2002, Red started playing for Power 105.1FM. After a five-year stint at Power 105-FM, Kool DJ Red Alert returned to his initial radio station KISS 98.7 FM in 2006. After parent company Emmis Communications sold the station's license to become the sports-talk radio-formatted ESPN Radio New York 98.7 FM, Kool DJ Red Alert performed his final mix on the pioneering urban-formatted station on April 29, 2012.

Red Alert has performed on multiple international tours with Boogie Down Productions, Jungle Brothers, as a solo artist, and is currently a member of the Funkmaster Flex-helmed deejay crew Lit Digital DJs.

He has eight grandchildren, his son and daughter are Robert Simon Kool G MiMe, and Alexus James. His nephew is rapper Mike Gee of the hip-hop group Jungle Brothers.

== Signature slang terms and drop ==
Red Alert is widely known for his former vibrato-style vocal chant "YEAAAAaaaaaah!" at the beginning and throughout his radio show mixes and appearances on various rap classic records. According to Red, the inspiration for his chant was from Looney Tunes cartoon character Foghorn Leghorn.

As a former bachelor, his self-ascribed moniker "The Propmaster" came from his gentleman-style approach to "properly" court women, or "props."

== Additional executive production credits ==
Kool DJ Red Alert had a small hip hop management company in the late 1980s called Red Alert Productions, which managed the careers of Native Tongues acts such as the Jungle Brothers, A Tribe Called Quest, Monie Love, and Black Sheep. Besides Chris "Baby Chris" Lighty's Violator, in the late 1980s through 1990s, Red Alert Productions was the only major hip-hop management alternative to Russell Simmons' Rush Artist Management and Cold Chillin' Records' management division. With his Red Alert Productions, Red Alert brokered a contract with Warner Bros. Records to release the Jungle Brothers seminal sophomore album Done By The Forces Of Nature.

His most notable guest features on hip hop records are Boogie Down Productions "Jimmy," The Jungle Brothers classic songs "Jimbrowski" and "Beyond This World," and A Tribe Called Quest's "Pubic Enemy." His most famous remixes are his additional productions on Jungle Brothers "J Beez Comin' Through (Red Alert Remix)," and his scratches on synthpop band Dominatrix 1983 hit record "The Dominatrix Sleeps Tonight (Remix)."

== Additional radio personality credits ==
Red is integral for helping increase the exposure of New York Radio Hall of Fame inductee Funkmaster Flex on the radio in the late 1980s. Funkmaster Flex was regular first choice by Red to be the fill-in deejay on his KISS-FM radio show, due to his occasional absences while on tour with Boogie Down Productions and Jungle Brothers in the late 1980s.

After the demise of WRKS as "98.7 Kiss FM", he became one of the deejays in rotation on the Afterwork Mix at 6 P.M. (Monday – Thursday), and performed during the holiday mix segments on WBLS. Until the end of 2014, he had a regular time slot on Saturday nights on WBLS at 11 PM EST. He also hosts the mix show Article One on Youth Radio 92.5 in the Virgin Islands and had a show on the Sirius Satellite Network station Backspin.

== Honorary awards ==
Kool DJ Red Alert has received numerous awards and accolades including a special award at the first annual Rap Hall of Fame Awards show. He was given the prestigious Lifetime Achievement Award from music trade publication Impact in 1998, and the 1997 Mix Show DJ of the year award from the now-defunct San Francisco-based radio industry trade publication Gavin. He was named one of the 50 most influential people in music by Rolling Stone magazine. Red Alert is the only hip hop deejay honored with a display in the Radio Section of the Rock and Roll Hall of Fame in Cleveland, Ohio. He has been appointed by the United Nations as an honorary Ambassador To Music. In June 2003, he was recognized with a location on the Bronx Walk of Fame, a series of street signs recognizing people of note from the borough, alongside other notables such as Colin Powell, who have originated from the Bronx.
