= WEPN =

WEPN may refer to:

- WEPN (AM), 1050 kHz, an ESPN affiliated sport radio station in New York City.
- WEPN-FM, 98.7 MHz, a radio station in New York City.
