= If It's Lovin' that You Want =

2005 single by Rihanna

"If It's Lovin' That You Want"

Single by Rihanna

from the album Music of the Sun
- Released: August 16, 2005
- Recorded: 2005
- Studio: Bassmint, The Loft (Bronxville, New York)
- Genre: Dancehall; R&B
- Length: 3:28
- Label: Def Jam; SRP
- Songwriters: Samuel Barnes; Scott La Rock; Makeba Riddick; Jean-Claude Oliver; Lawrence Parker
- Producer: Poke & Tone

Rihanna singles chronology
"Pon de Replay" (2005)	"If It's Lovin' That You Want" (2005)	"SOS" (2006)

Music video
- "If It's Lovin' That You Want" on YouTube

"If It's Lovin' That You Want" is a song by Barbadian singer Rihanna from her debut studio album, Music of the Sun (2005). It was written by Samuel Barnes, Scott La Rock, Makeba Riddick, Jean-Claude Oliver, Lawrence Parker, and produced by Poke & Tone. It was released on August 16, 2005, as the second and final single from the album. The lyrics revolve around "basically telling a guy, 'If it's lovin' that you want, you should make me your girl because I've got what you need".

The song received mixed reviews from music critics, many of whom praised its composition, while others were divided on Rihanna's vocal performance. "If It's Lovin' that You Want" achieved moderate success around the world, reaching the top forty in few European countries, while reaching the top ten in Australia, Ireland and New Zealand. In the United States, the song failed to match the commercial success of Rihanna's previous single, "Pon de Replay", peaking at number 36 on the Billboard Hot 100 chart. It managed, however, to reach number nine on the Pop Songs chart. The song's accompanying music video, directed by Marcus Raboy, was shot on a beach in California, and features the singer enjoying several activities, such as dancing and riding jet skis with her friends.

== Background and composition ==
Rihanna — "If It's Lovin' that You Want"
A 20 second sample of "If It's Lovin' that You Want", of which critics both praised Rihanna's vocal range but also criticized the singer for sounding "too light" and "thin".

Following the release and commercial success of "Pon de Replay", the lead single from Music of the Sun and Rihanna's debut in the music industry, "If It's Lovin' that You Want" was released as the second single from the album. In an interview with MTV News, Rihanna explained the lyrical meaning behind the song, saying "The song is basically telling a guy, 'If it's lovin' that you want, you should make me your girl because I've got what you need".

Musically, is a dancehall and R&B song, reinforcing Rihanna's "tropical reggae signature". According to the digital music sheet published at musicnotes.com, "If It's Lovin' that You Want" is written in the key of A-flat major and is set in common time with a moderate dance groove with a metronome of 98 beats per minute. Rihanna's vocal range in the song spans from the low note of F_{3} to the high note of G_{5}. A sequel to the song titled "If It's Lovin' That You Want – Part 2", which features rap vocals by Cory Gunz, was included as a bonus track on Rihanna's sophomore album, A Girl Like Me (2006). The song was written by Samuel Barnes, Scott LaRock, Makeba Riddick, Jean-Claude Oliver, Lawrence Parker and was produced by the latter two under their production name, Poke & Tone of Trackmasters." "If It's Lovin' that You Want" contains interpolations from the composition "The Bridge Is Over", as performed by Boogie Down Productions, and written by Scott La Rock and Lawrence Parker.

== Critical reception ==
The song was met with generally mixed reviews from music critics, who were split on Rihanna's vocal performance. Bill Lamb of About.com wrote that although the singer provides "simple, pleasant vocals", her voice sounds "too light" and "thin". Lamb continued to comment about the song, writing that although the song is "pleasurable" and "summery" to listen to and is not "offensive", it fails to re-capture the "killer hook of 'Pon de Replay'". However, A. Vishnu of The Hindu had contrasting opinions with regard to Rihanna's vocal performance, writing the song further "exposes her versatility and vocal range". A reviewer for Billboard praised the song's composition and beat, writing "['If It's Lovin' that You Want'] reinforces Rihanna's tropical reggae signature with an itchy hook that, albeit monotonous, cannot miss." A reviewer of Take40 and Kelefa Sanneh of The New York Times were brief in their reviews of "If It's Lovin' that You Want", with the former writing that the song is more "low-key" compared to Rihanna's previous release, "Pon de Replay", and the latter simply writing that it is a "pretty good" song.

== Chart performance ==
"If It's Lovin' that You Want" peaked at number 36 on the Billboard Hot 100, failing to match the commercial success of Rihanna's previous single, "Pon de Replay", only peaking within the top ten of three national charts. In Australia, the song debuted and peaked on the Australian Singles Chart at number 9 on February 6, 2006. The song fell one position the following week to number ten, but managed to peak at number 9 again in its third week. In total, the song spent two non-consecutive weeks at number 9 and fourteen weeks on the chart. In New Zealand, the song debuted at number 12 on the New Zealand Singles Chart on December 19, 2005. During "If It's Lovin' that You Want"'s first four weeks of charting, it fluctuated in the top twenty, but managed to peak at number 9 in its fifth week for one week. In total, the song spent 12 weeks on the chart.

In Europe, "If It's Lovin' that You Want" debuted on the Austrian Singles Chart at number 40 on December 16, 2005. During the song's first five weeks on the chart, it struggled to stay inside the top forty, but in its sixth week, managed to peak at number 31 for one week, and spent a total of 11 weeks on the chart. In Switzerland, the song debuted at number 25 on December 18, 2005, and peaked at number 19. The song spent a total of 12 weeks on the chart. In The Netherlands, the song debuted at number 76 on February 4, 2006, and peaked at number 13 the following week. The song spent a total of 7 weeks on the chart. In the Flanders region of Belgium, the song debuted at number 50 December 31, 2005, but dropped out of the chart the following week, but re-entered the chart at number 38 on January 21, 2006, and peaked at number 25 the following week. The song spent a total of 10 weeks on the chart. In the United Kingdom, the song debuted and peaked on the UK Singles Chart at number 11 on December 10, 2005, and dropped out of the Official UK Top 40 after five weeks on the chart.

== Music video ==
Rihanna lying on a beach in the music video for "If It's Lovin' That You Want"

The music video for the song was shot on a stretch of beach on the coast of California in Malibu and directed by Marcus Raboy on August 9, 2005. In an interview with MTV News, Rihanna spoke about the development of the shoot for the video, saying "The water was so cold ... but oh my gosh, we had so much fun ... We were bumping each other off the Jet Skis and just had a ball". During the interview, the singer elaborated further upon the content of the video and the meaning behind it, saying "This video is about having fun, giving off the vibe of the Caribbean ... we did some mermaid-looking stuff down on the sand ...and I'm just [performing] to the camera as if it were my boyfriend. Now we're going to do [some scenes with] the Tiki torches. It's going to be incredible". The dance routines in the video were choreographed by noted choreographer Fatima Robinson.

The video begins with scenes of Rihanna dancing and walking along the beach and riding jet skis with her friends during the first chorus and continues into the first verse. Halfway through the first verse, a new scene of the singer is introduced, where she is dancing on a platform with four other female dancers, wearing a "short, flowing white skirt and a cropped tee", with the ocean as the backdrop behind her. During the second chorus, the previous scenes are intercut with each other, and continue into the second verse, where a new scene of the singer wearing a different outfit and lying on the beach, whilst also choreographing with some male extras. For the third chorus, which is repeated twice, another new scene of Rihanna is shown with four other female dancers who belly dance in the middle of a Tiki torch circle during the night.

== Track listing ==
- Digital download
1. "If It's Lovin' That You Want" – 3:50
- CD single
1. "If It's Lovin' That You Want" (Album Version) – 3:28
2. "If It's Lovin' That You Want" (Instrumental) – 3:20
3. "Pon de Replay" (Pon de Club Play) – 7:32
4. "If It's Lovin' That You Want" (Video) – 3:36
- Digital EP
1. "If It's Lovin' That You Want" – 3:27
2. "If It's Lovin' That You Want" (Instrumental) – 3:20
3. "Pon de Replay" (Pon de Club Play) – 7:32

== Charts ==
=== Weekly charts ===
Weekly chart performance
Chart (2005–2006)	Peak position
Australia (ARIA)	9
Australian Urban (ARIA)	3
Austria (Ö3 Austria Top 40)	31
Belgium (Ultratop 50 Flanders)	25
Belgium (Ultratip Bubbling Under Wallonia)	2
Canada CHR/Pop Top 30 (Radio & Records)	5
European Hot 100 Singles (Billboard)	35
Germany (GfK)	25
Ireland (IRMA)	8
Italy (FIMI)	22
Netherlands (Dutch Top 40)	17
Netherlands (Single Top 100)	13
New Zealand (Recorded Music NZ)	9
Romania (Romanian Top 100)	18
Scotland Singles (OCC)	13
Switzerland (Schweizer Hitparade)	19
UK Singles (OCC)	11
UK Hip Hop/R&B (OCC)	3
US Billboard Hot 100	36
US Hot R&B/Hip-Hop Songs (Billboard)	99
US Pop Airplay (Billboard)	9
US Rhythmic Airplay (Billboard)	25

=== Year-end charts ===
2006 year-end chart performance
Chart (2006)	Position
Australia (ARIA)	64
Australian Urban (ARIA)	18
Romania (Romanian Top 100)	69

== Certifications ==
Certifications
Region	Certification	Certified units/sales
Australia (ARIA)	Platinum	70,000^{‡}
Brazil (Pro-Música Brasil)	Gold	30,000^{‡}
New Zealand (RMNZ)	Platinum	30,000^{‡}
United Kingdom (BPI)	Gold	400,000^{‡}
United States (RIAA)	Platinum	1,000,000^{‡}
^{‡} Sales+streaming figures based on certification alone.

== Release history ==
Release dates and formats
Region	Date	Format(s)	Label(s)	Ref.
United States	August 16, 2005	12-inch vinyl	Def Jam; SRP	
United States	August 30, 2005	Rhythmic contemporary radio	Def Jam; SRP	
United States	September 13, 2005	Urban contemporary radio	Def Jam; SRP	
United States	September 20, 2005	Contemporary hit radio	Def Jam; SRP	
United Kingdom	November 28, 2005	CD	Mercury	
Germany	December 2, 2005	Maxi CD	Universal Music	
Australia	January 23, 2006	Maxi CD	Universal Music	
