= The Bridge Is Over =

Single by Boogie Down Productions

from the album Criminal Minded
- B-side: "A Word From Our Sponsor"
- Released: March 3, 1987
- Recorded: 1987
- Genre: East Coast hip hop, golden age hip hop
- Length: 3:26
- Label: B-Boy Records
- Songwriters: Scott La Rock, Lawrence Parker, Billy Joel

BDP singles chronology
"Super Hoe" (1986)	"The Bridge Is Over" (1987)	"Poetry" (1987)

"The Bridge Is Over" is a 1987 song by Boogie Down Productions from their debut album Criminal Minded, performed by rapper KRS-One and produced by DJ Scott LaRock and KRS-One. The song's intro samples "The Bridge" by MC Shan.

== History ==
It is considered to be a classic diss track, aimed at MC Shan, Marley Marl, the Juice Crew and rappers from Queens, NY and the Queensbridge projects.

It, and from the same album, "South Bronx", are the most famous songs of The Bridge Wars between rappers from the Bronx and Queens.

The song's lyrics at the end are set to the tune of the famous Billy Joel song "It's Still Rock and Roll to Me":

"It's Still Rock and Roll to Me"

What's the matter with the crowd I'm seeing?
"Don't you know that they're out of touch?"
Should I try to be a straight 'A' student?
"If you are then you think too much.
Don't you know about the new fashion honey?
All you need are looks and a whole lotta money."
It's the next phase, new wave, dance craze, anyways
It's still rock and roll to me
Everybody's talkin' 'bout the new sound
Funny, but it's still rock and roll to me

"The Bridge Is Over"

Whats the matter with your MC, Marley Marl?
Don't know you know that he's out of touch?
What's the matter with your DJ, MC Shan?
On the wheels of steel, Marlon sucks!
You'd better change what comes out your speaker
You're better off talkin' 'bout your wack Puma sneaker
Cause Bronx created hip-hop, Queens will only get dropped,
You're still tellin' lies to me.
Everybody's talkin' 'bout the Juice Crew funny
But you're still tellin' lies to me

The song went on to become one of the most sampled hip hop songs in hip hop history.

== Legacy and influence ==
- The song was sampled in MC Ren's song "Final Frontier", from his 1992 EP Kizz My Black Azz.
- The song was sampled in Rihanna's single "If It's Lovin' That You Want".
- The song was sampled in 50 Cent's song "Da Heatwave".
- The song was sampled in Queensbridge native Nas's song "Destroy & Rebuild." "The Bridge Is Over" is heavily alluded to as Nas argues that the Bridge is not in fact "over" throughout the song.
- The song's instrumental was used in the film Get Rich or Die Tryin', starring 50 Cent, which a young Marcus is rapping over the beat.
- A pitch-shifted version of the song is used in Coldcut's seminal entry in the Journeys by DJ series.
- The song was sampled by Pusha T and Kendrick Lamar in the song "Nosetalgia".
- The Impeach snare was used in "Creep" by TLC.
- The drum break was sampled in "Car Thief" by The Beastie Boys on their album Paul's Boutique.

== See also ==
- List of notable diss tracks
