= Big Fun in the Big Town =

- Genre: Music documentary
- Created by: Marcel Vanthilt
- Directed by: Bram van Splunteren
- Starring: Marcel Vanthilt; Run–D.M.C. LL Cool J Doug E. Fresh; Grandmaster Flash; Roxanne Shante; Biz Markie; MC Shan; Russell Simmons; Mr. Magic; Schoolly D The Last Poets
- Country of origin: Netherlands
- Original languages: English; Dutch (introduction & host narration)
- No. of episodes: 1 (two-parter)

Production
- Running time: 40 minutes
- Production company: VPRO

Original release
- Network: VPRO
- Release: November 30, 1986

Big Fun in the Big Town is a Dutch music documentary made by the VPRO in 1986. It was directed by Bram van Splunteren and presented by Belgian TV presenter Marcel Vanthilt. The documentary was shot on location in New York City and consisted of two parts, one about rock singer Iggy Pop and the Stooges, the other about the American hip hop scene. The latter turned out to have a much bigger impact on the Dutch music scene and enjoys a cult classic status among hip-hop fans.

== Recording ==
The documentary was made in September 1986 in eight days time and filmed in the streets of New York City. Vanthilt and his four Dutch colleagues had hired some body guards for protection from local street gangs. They managed to interview several important pioneers of early hip hop, including Run–D.M.C., LL Cool J, Doug E. Fresh, Grandmaster Flash, Roxanne Shante, Biz Markie, MC Shan, Russell Simmons, Mr. Magic, Schoolly D and The Last Poets. Grandmaster Flash showed his talents in scratching and DJing, Doug E. Fresh did beatboxing on a busy street corner in Harlem, New York and LL Cool J still lived with his grandmother at time of recording. The documentary crew literally arrived at a turning point for hip hop. Run–D.M.C. had just released the single "Walk This Way", their duet with the rock band Aerosmith, which would cause mainstream acceptance of the genre by a major white audience. Because of this element Big Fun in the Big Town still provides a unique time capsule.

== Impact ==
Big Fun in the Big Town was broadcast on Sunday 30 November 1986 at 8:10 p.m on Nederland 2, receiving a lot of praise afterwards. The documentary has been rebroadcast several times since, and was given credit by an entire generation of Dutch rappers and hip hop artists as an important inspiration; including Osdorp Posse, The Opposites, Kraantje Pappie, Gers Pardoel, De Jeugd van Tegenwoordig, Brainpower and Def P. among others.

== Availability ==
The documentary became available on DVD in 2012. USA Today, The New York Times and Rolling Stone praised it in their reviews. The Guardian ranked it at number 10 in their list of the ten best music documentaries of all time.

== Soundtrack album ==
A soundtrack album was also made available in 2012.

=== Track list ===
From Discogs.

1. "South Bronx" – Boogie Down Productions (5:10)
2. "9mm Goes Bang" – Boogie Down Productions (4:19)
3. "Cold Getting Dumb" – Just-Ice (4:32)
4. "Latoya" – Just-Ice (4:11)
5. "Breaking Bells" – T La Rock (5:24)
6. "Back to Burn" – T La Rock (3:35)
7. "Jockbox" – Skinny Boys (4:33)
8. "Leave It to the Drums" – Tricky Tee (4:40)
9. "Bassline" – Mantronix (5:27)
10. "Ladies" – Mantronix (6:54)
