= South Bronx (song) =

Single by Boogie Down Productions

from the album Criminal Minded
- B-side: "The P is Free"
- Released: 1986
- Recorded: 1986
- Genre: Hardcore hip hop
- Length: 5:10
- Label: B-Boy
- Songwriters: KRS-One, Scott La Rock
- Producers: DJ Scott La Rock, KRS-One

BDP singles chronology
"Say No Brother (Crack Attack Don't Do It)" (1986)	"South Bronx" (1986)	"Super Hoe" (1987)

"South Bronx" is a song by American hip hop group Boogie Down Productions, released as the lead single from their debut studio album Criminal Minded (1987). The song's title references New York City's South Bronx area, and is one of the earliest homages to an MC's hometown.

The song was produced by DJ Scott La Rock and KRS-One. The song serves as a diss track aimed at MC Shan in response to his song "The Bridge", and is part of what became known as The Bridge Wars.

== History ==
KRS-One's brother, Kenny Parker, wrote in his autobiography that KRS and DJ Scott La Rock had turned up uninvited at Mr. Magic's show on WBLS to ask about joining his Juice Crew. Mr. Magic responded that they were not on the same level as MC Shan and Marley Marl, cursed them and told them to leave. This led KRS and Scott to plot revenge and they chose MC Shan to diss for his latest track, The Bridge.

KRS-One reports that Kool DJ Red Alert played the song three times in a row and that the crowd was very engaged. The song had an influence on the new jack swing genre.

== Composition ==
The song samples "Get Up Offa That Thing" and does so through the use of a sampler, where the horn bar is available in several different pitches. Eleven different pitches are used throughout the recording including the actual one, 7 of which were used altogether to create a threatening effect. The song also samples "Funky Drummer" and "Get Up, Get Into It, Get Involved" by James Brown, as well as "Let's Get Small" by Trouble Funk.
