= DJ Rap =

British drum and bass, house music and progressive electronic music producer and DJ

- DJ Rap in 2003

Background information
- Born: Charissa Saverio; 7 December 1969 (age 56); Singapore
- Genres: Electronic, drum and bass, jungle
- Occupations: Record producer, DJ
- Years active: 1987–present
- Website: www.djrap.com

Charissa Saverio (born 7 December 1969), and better known as DJ Rap, is a British drum and bass, house and progressive electronic music producer and DJ.

While the majority of her work is in the jungle style, her more successful work is in traditional electronic music. DJ Rap owns, records for, runs and A&Rs two record labels Propa Talent and Impropa Talent. She is also a producer, model and actress.

== Biography ==
DJ Rap was born in Singapore, daughter of an Italian father and an Irish-Malaysian mother. She is the daughter of actress Elaine Edley. The family moved to Southampton, England, when Saverio was a teenager. She later lived in Walthamstow, East London before she became a DJ.

She has worked as an engineer, often collaborating with other artists. After being the first artist on the scene to self-release her first CD, she signed to Sony along with Grooverider and Leftfield.

Her artist album, Learning Curve, was released in 1999 to critical acclaim, and resulted in several stylized music videos, including two versions of "Good to Be Alive" (one for the CD version and another for the radio remix) and "Bad Girl", a song about having to be a strong woman to survive. Rolling Stone gave Learning Curve three and a half stars, stating "this is the record Madonna wanted to make".

She also released compilation albums Journeys by DJ, Propa Classics Vol. 1 and 2, Brave New World, Armani Exchange CHEMISTRY and Touching Bass, Bulletproof, and Up All Night.

DJ Rap has also done vocals for several artists, including BT (for "Giving Up the Ghost") and Art of Trance (for "Madagascar [Domi Nation Remix]").

In 2014, she played "Hologram Girl" in The Principle, a documentary examining the Copernican Principle.

In the short films Riddle of the Mask and Truth of the Mask, she portrayed Helena Bertinelli aka the Huntress.

== Discography ==
=== Albums ===
- Intelligence (1995)
- Learning Curve (1999)
- Synthesis (2010)

=== Mix albums ===
- Journeys Through the Land of Drum N Bass (Journeys by DJ, 1995)
- Propa Talent Classics, Volume 1 (2001)
- Touching Bass (2003)
- Bulletproof (2005)
- Up All Night (2006)
- A Propa History, Volume 1 (2008)

=== Singles ===
- "Divine Rhythm" (1992) (with Voyager)
- "Spiritual Aura" (1994)
- "Total Tangent / Tibetan Jungle" (1994)
- "Digable Bass" (1994)
- "Switch" (1995) (with Outlaw Candy)
- "Intelligent Woman" (1995) (with Outlaw Candy)
- "I'm So" (1997) (vs. Da Boss)
- "Bad Girl" (1998)
- "Everyday Girl" (1998)
- "Good to Be Alive" (1998) (US Dance Chart #5)
- "Give It All Away" (2010)
- "Feel So Alive" (2010) (with Jo)
- "Talking to Myself" (2012) (with tyDi)
- "Back & Forth" (2021)
