= Big Apple Rappin' =

Compilation album by Various artists
- Released: 2006
- Genre: Hip hop
- Length: 110:58
- Label: Soul Jazz
- Compiler: Johan Kugelberg

Big Apple Rappin' (subtitled: The Early Days of Hip-Hop Culture in New York City 1979–1982) is a 2006 compilation album released on Soul Jazz Records. The album is a compilation of the early days of New York hip hop by Johan Kugelberg, who had collected early hip hop material, specifically records flyers and fanzines and other memorabilia with the idea to donate them to an academic institution. The music Kugelberg gathered for the compilation surrounded hip hop music released around the period "Rapper's Delight" became a hit song. The music is predominantly hip hop with a disco backing tracks which Kugelberg described as "the first great records." Along with the music, photography and flyers were compiled from the era, as well as interviews with DJs and rappers such as Grandmaster Caz and Glen Adams.

Reviews of the album complimented the in-depth research and compiling of the compilation album, with some critics noting the dated or repetitive nature of the music and long length of the individual tracks as drawbacks. Jon Dolan of Spin gave the album a five-star rating and later included it in the magazines best reissues of 2006 list in 2007. Along with Kugelberg's collected records, a copy of the album is included in Cornell University's Division of Rare and Manuscript Collections.

== Background and development ==
Big Apple Rappin' was compiled by Johan Kugelberg, a Swedish-born New York-based music collector and historian who spent the 1990s working at various record labels. In the late 1990s and early 2000s, Kugelberg began focusing on specific areas of pop culture history, collecting related material from the eras: specifically punk music and early hip hop records, fanzines, flyers and other memorabilia of the period. Kugelberg's collection of early hip hop material was made with the focus to "create a substantial archive to place at an academic institution, to do a great book, and some really good reissues." Kugelberg found trying to organize the history of the genre as "staggeringly difficult", noting that "histories of specific firsts: First MC, first scratcher on record, first live jam, first indoor jam, and naturally the first hip hop record? Small record companies run by independent entrepreneurs hustling to make a buck, don't keep detailed documentation on the records they release."

The material Kugelberg collected was later included in the Born in the Bronx book and exhibit which included 500 flyers, unreleased hip bop battle tapes, photographs, magazines, posters, all of which were donated to Cornell University's Division of Rare and Manuscript Collections. The album Big Apple Rappin' was included in the Cornell University collection.

== Music and content ==
Discussing the music on the compilation, Kugelberg stated that following the release of "Rapper's Delight" and in some cases, before that track, hip hop music was treated to "a lot of shitty rap records, and against all odds, some truly great ones" stating that this compilation was about "the first great records." The music on the album features predominantly disco and R&B-backed tracks that Bret McCabe of The New York Sun described as being structured more like dance music than contemporary hip hop, being over five minutes in length. Some songs used as backing tracks include Michael Jackson's "Don't Stop 'Til You Get Enough" and Cheryl Lynn's "Got to Be Real". Only one song features a drum machine: Masterdon Committee's "Funk Box Party".

The rappers on the album contain both male and female performers. The lyrics are predominantly simple with basic flows, ranging from the discussion of the rappers greatness on the microphone, making audiences dance and who they are why they earned their nicknames. Some tracks expand into broader topics such as Spyder D's "Big Apple Rappin'" which celebrates the New York hip hop scene and several crews and blocks in the area. Brother "D" with Collective Effort's "How We Gonna Make the Black Nation Rise?" specifically goes into more political themes, with Andy Kellman of AllMusic describing as being closer to the lyrics of groups like The Last Poets and The Watts Prophets. Outside music, the album contains interviews with Jamaican reggae and hip hop producer Glen Adams, Clappers Records founder Lister Hewan-Lowe, DJ and rapper Grandmaster Caz, flier designer Buddy Esquire, and photography of hip hop artists and groups of the era by Joe Conzo.

== Release and reception ==
Professional ratings
Review scores
Source	Rating
AllMusic	4.5/5 stars
The Irish Times	4/5 stars
Pitchfork Media	(7.0/10)
Rolling Stone	4/5 stars
Spin	5/5 stars
The Stranger	3/4 stars

Big Apple Rappin was released in 2006 by Soul Jazz Records on compact disc and vinyl record. Kellman gave the album a four and a half star rating out of five, noting that the album only contained a few well known singles, specifically "Spoonin' Rap" by Spoonie Gee and "Weekend" by the Cold Crush Brothers. Kellman commented that the album will "appeal most to hip-hop fans who have only the basics. For hip-hop neophytes and younger listeners who were born too late, it might be like jumping into an advanced class, but the whole thing is too fun to make you feel lost." Kellman commented that some songs "might sound archaic and practically novelty-like" while noting that "the infectious exuberance on display through the whole thing, along with the knowledge of how this culture would continue to develop, more than makes up for whatever misgivings you might have toward the simplicity of it all." Jeff Chang of The Village Voice declared the album "A fine new two-CD compilation lovingly curated and annotated by Swedish transplant Johan Kugelberg captures what happened after the unexpected success of "Rapper's Delight." Peter Macia of Pitchfork Media commented that "songs here are more than rose-tinted artifacts. While they do convey the blitheness before "The Message", they also dispel myths about hip-hop's natal innocence, naiveté, and homogeneity. Most importantly though, for songs built specifically not-to-last, some still sound pretty fresh." Jon Dolan of Spin referred to the album as "euphoric" and awarded it five stars. Dolan later listed it among the best reissues of the year at tenth place in the January 2007 issue of Spin. Andy Beta of The Stranger gave the album a three out of four rating, noting the music's "nascent art form is here in all its endearing early quirks: endless disco loops tether the rambling rhymes" praising the sets highlight as Brother D & Collective Effort's "How We Gonna Make the Black Nation Rise" Jim Carroll writing for The Irish Times found that compared to contemporary hip hop music, the artists on Big Apple Rappin' sounded more innocent and that on playing them side by side, the artists on this album were having more fun.

McCabe contested that after several 1990s reissues, box sets and mix tapes of hip hop music this compilation "doesn't cover much new ground, but it makes for a fascinating piece of musical archaeology. The set's compiler, the tireless underground archivist Johan Kugelberg, gathered a number of previously hard-to-find tracks [...] Still, the set feels a little like a museum exhibition, trapped in glass." and that the liner notes "can't fill in the narrative holes surrounding the collected songs. The CDs as a whole would have been better served by expanded interviews with the people who were actually there." Noel Dix of Exclaim! noted that the style of hip hop from the period on compilation "does grow a little tiresome once you get to the second disc" but stated that there were "some definite classics to be heard" specifically pointing out "How We Gonna Make a Black Nation Rise?", "Spoonin' Rap", and the tracks by Super 3 and Nice and Nasty 3". Dix concluded that Big Apple Rappin serves well as a history lesson and one or two of these jams will get the crowd bugging out on the dance floor, but the repetitiveness and long-windedness might make it a hard pill to swallow all at once."

== Track listing ==
Track listing adapted from back of vinyl sleeve and sticker covers.

No.	Title	Writer(s)	Credited Performer	Length
1.	"Spoonin Rap"	Spoonin Gee	Spoonin Gee	6:58
2.	"Sure Shot"	S. Mcculluck	Xanadu	5:26
3.	"How We Gonna Make the Black Nation Rise?"	Nubyahn, S. Lynn	Brother "D" with Collective Effort	5:51
4.	"Rapping Dub Style"		General Echo	4:13
5.	"Catch the Beat"	T. Cox, B. Osborne	T Ski Valley	8:33
6.	"Dancing Heart"	P. Brown	Universal 2	7:52
7.	"Funk Box Party"	Bobby Robinson	Masterdon Committee	6:58
8.	"Weekend"	Fischer, Dobson, Mendes, Skelton	Cold Crush Brothers	5:35

No.	Title	Writer(s)	Credited Performer	Length
1.	"Big Apple Rappin’"	D. Hughes, E. Rice, P. Pierce, W. White, B. Motley	Spyder D	10:18
2.	"D. J. Style"		Mr Q	5:04
3.	"Fly Guys Rap"	Peter Brown	The Fly Guys	7:41
4.	"Get the Party Jumpin'"	Solo Sound	Solo Sound	6:17
5.	"Rock the Beat"	Reid, R. Miller	The Jamaica Girls	6:23
6.	"When You're Standing On Top"	L. Douglas, D. Reid, D. Robinson	Super 3	6:52
7.	"Are You Ready?"		TJ Swann, Peewee Mel & Barry B	7:31
8.	"The Ultimate Rap"	T. Simmon, C. Sherrod	Nice & Nasty 3	9:17

== Credits ==
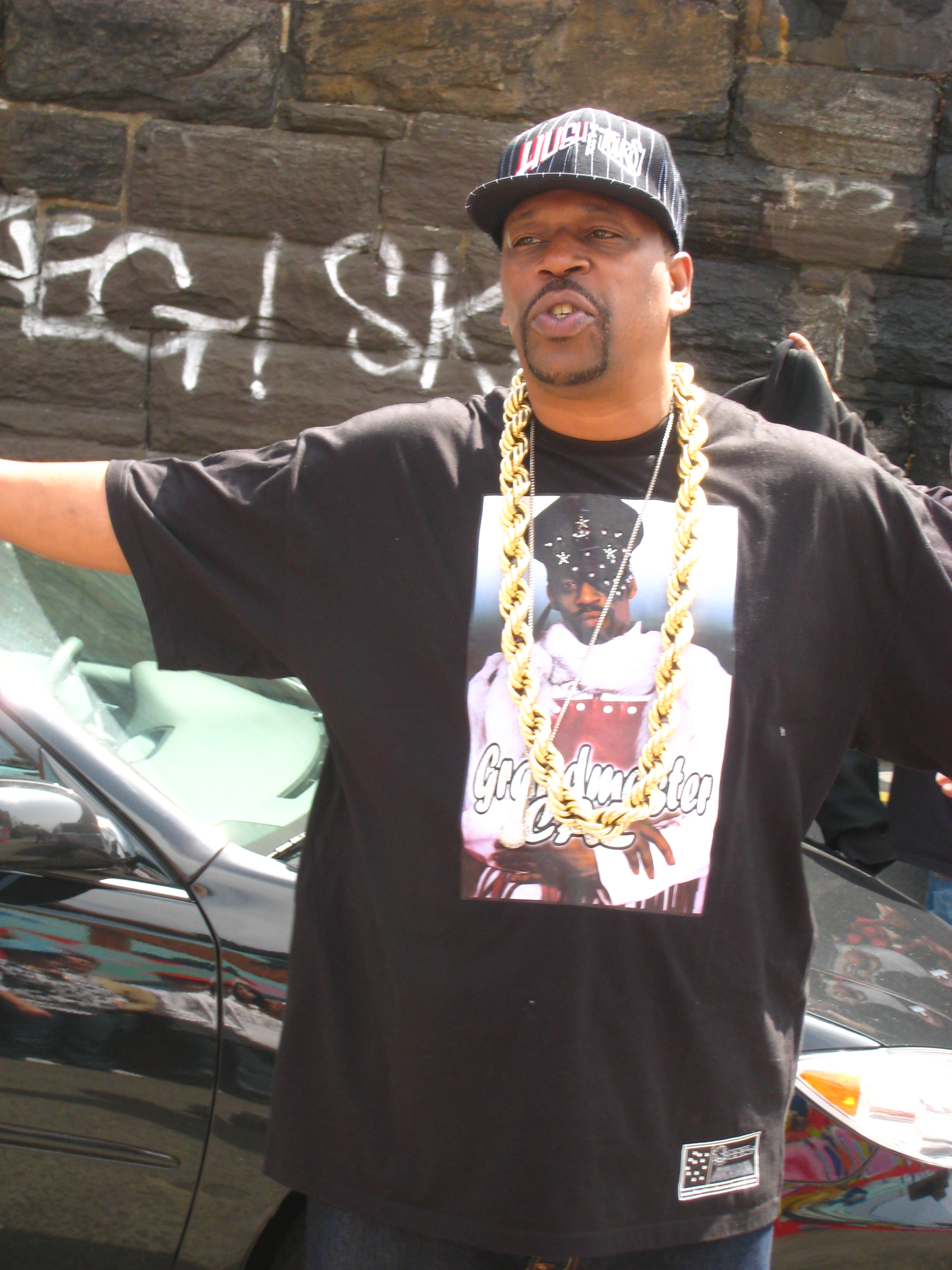
Grandmaster Caz was interviewed in the album's liner sleeve.

Credits adapted from the vinyl liner notes.

- Johan Kugelberg – compiler, sleeve notes, interviewer, photography, flyer collection
- Adrian Self – sleeve, interviewer
- Fly Paper – sleeve
- Angela Scott – licensing
- Joe Conzo – photography
- Pete Reilly – mastering
- Duncan Cowell – mastering
- Pierece Smith – reproduction
- Glen Adams – interviewee
- Grandmaster Caz – interviewee
- Buddy Esquire – interviewee
- Lister Hewan-Lowe – interviewee
