= Criminal Minded =

Album by the rap group Boogie Down Productions

Studio album by Boogie Down Productions
- Released: May 1987
- Recorded: 1986–1987
- Genres: Hardcore hip-hop; gangsta rap
- Length: 51:43
- Labels: B-Boy, BB 4787
- Producers: Scott La Rock; KRS-One; Ced-Gee

Boogie Down Productions chronology
| Criminal Minded (1987) | Man & His Music (Remixes from Around the World) (1987) |

Singles from Criminal Minded
- 1. "South Bronx" Released: 1986; 2. "The Bridge Is Over" Released: March 3, 1987; 3. "Super-Hoe" Released: 1987

Criminal Minded is the debut studio album by the American hip-hop group Boogie Down Productions. It was released in May 1987 through B-Boy Records. It is considered a highly influential hip-hop album and one of the first in the gangsta rap genre.

The songs "South Bronx" and "The Bridge Is Over" ignited the rivalry with the Brooklyn-bred but Queens resident emcee MC Shan and the Juice Crew. Throughout the album, KRS-One gives honor and praise to Scott La Rock for producing the album and he mostly goes on about the importance of originality and being "real" instead of a "Sucker MC".

In 2003, the album was ranked number 444 on Rolling Stone's list of "The 500 Greatest Albums of All Time", and was later ranked number 239 in the 2020 edition.

== Background ==
Production on the LP is credited to Blastmaster' KRS-One (Lawrence Krisna Parker) and DJ Scott La Rock (Scott Sterling), with a special thanks to Ced-Gee (Cedric Miller) of The Ultramagnetic MCs on the back cover.

The cover, which showcases Parker and Sterling surrounded by an arsenal of weapons, was hip-hop's first major release to feature members brandishing firearms. The album also contained several seminal hardcore songs such as "9mm Goes Bang", one of the first hip-hop songs to be based around a first-person crime narrative, and "P Is Free", which details an encounter with a drug-abusing prostitute.

The liner notes of Criminal Minded read, "Peace to Ron Nelson and the Toronto posse." This statement is evidence of BDP's involvement with Toronto's hip-hop scene in the 1980s, which produced artists such as Michie Mee, Dream Warriors, and Maestro Fresh Wes.

== Release ==
The album was released in May 1987 through B-Boy Records.

The relationship between the group and B-Boy Records quickly deteriorated. KRS-One sued the label for failing to pay royalties. A lawsuit was launched, which was eventually settled out-of-court. Having left B-Boy Records, new friend Ice-T introduced BDP to Warner Bros. Records' Benny Medina, head of the label's Black-music division, who promptly agreed to sign the duo in principle to a new record deal. However, the Warner Brothers deal was later rescinded after Scott La Rock's murder.

By this time, Sterling had befriended a neighborhood teenager named Derrick "D-Nice" Jones, who did a human beatboxing routine for the group. One evening, Jones was assaulted by some local hoodlums and he later called Sterling to run interference. The next day, Sterling and a group of others came to the stoop where the offending parties lived. Sterling's intention was to try and mediate things, but one of the hoods pulled out a gun and began shooting at random. In the ensuing confusion, Sterling was hit in the neck. Critically wounded, he died an hour later in hospital, leaving behind an infant son. Warner Bros. reneged on the new deal in the aftermath of Sterling's death. Parker, however, decided that the group should continue. A handful of friends were brought into the collective, including Parker's new wife Ms. Melodie and brother Kenny Parker, with whom he had just recently reunited. Original member and Criminal Minded co-producer Lee Smith was dropped by Parker in pursuit of a deal. Signing with Jive/RCA Records, Parker recorded eight albums for that label in a 10-year period, eventually dropping the Boogie Down Productions moniker and billing himself as a solo performer. R.E.M. and others recruited him for collaborations, and he was among the few hip-hop acts at the Beastie Boys' Tibetan Freedom Concerts. Meanwhile, Criminal Minded became notoriously hard to find, falling in and out of print every few years, surfacing with a different distributor every time. Eventually, the Boston-based independent label LandSpeed Records purchased the rights of the B-Boy Records catalogue, hence a re-release in 2002. An expanded re-release titled The Best of B-Boy Records: Boogie Down Productions includes longer versions of the album's tracks and several 12-inch singles that didn't make Criminal Minded's original pressing. On Spotify this bumper pack is simply known as Criminal Minded (Deluxe). The album was re-released again in 2006—original art intact—when LandSpeed became Traffic Entertainment Group.

== Critical reception ==
Retrospective professional ratings
Review scores
| Source | Rating |
|---|---|
| AllMusic | 5/5 stars |
| Christgau's Record Guide | B+ |
| The Encyclopedia of Popular Music | 5/5 stars |
| The Great Rock Discography | 8/10 |
| Music Story | 4.5/5 stars |
| MusicHound R&B | 5/5 stars |
| The Rolling Stone Album Guide | 5/5 stars |
| The Source | 5/5 |
| Spin Alternative Record Guide | 10/10 |

Criminal Minded was well received by critics. In 1988, for The Village Voice, Robert Christgau wrote in his "Consumer Guide" column:

Though one's moralistic quibbles do recede as history demonstrates how much worse things can get and how little music has to do with it, KRS-One's talk of fucking virgins and blowing brains out will never make him my B-boy of the first resort. I could do without the turf war, too—from the Lower East Side, not to mention Kingston or Kinshasa (or Podunk), Queens and the South Bronx are both def enough. But his mind is complex and exemplary—he's sharp and articulate, his idealism more than a gang-code and his confusion profound. And Scott LaRock was a genius. Sampling blues metal as well as James Brown, spinning grooves to toast by, blind-siding the beat with grunts and telephones and dim backtalk, he was spare and rich simultaneously. Music will miss him more than Jaco Pastorius and Will Shatter put together.

In 1998, Criminal Minded was selected by The Source as one of the 100 Best Rap Albums. Vibe included it in its list of the 100 Essential Albums of the 20th Century in 1999, and in 2002, the magazine placed it at number three on its list of the Top 10 Rap Albums. In 2003, the album was ranked number 444 on Rolling Stone magazine's list of the 500 greatest albums of all time, and was later ranked 239 in the 2020 edition.

Complex named the song "South Bronx" as the ninth-best hip-hop dis song of all-time.

In 2017, rapper MC Ren named Criminal Minded as his all-time favorite hip-hop album. MC Ren also heavily sampled "The Bridge Is Over" on his 1992 single "Final Frontier".

"This album was so important to me. I'd never seen so many weapons on a cover before. It didn't look like a photoshoot: it looked like they really were in the street, doing shit they shouldn't have been. It was the first record where blatant disrespect to an area was thoroughly embraced – even by the guys in Queensbridge, the neighbourhood that KRS-One was attacking!" – Busta Rhymes

== Track listing ==
| # | Title | Songwriters | Producer(s) | Performer (s) | Length |
| 1 | "Poetry" | L. Parker; S. LaRock | Ced Gee; DJ Scott La Rock; KRS-One | KRS-One | 5:01 |
| 2 | "South Bronx" | L. Parker; S. LaRock | DJ Scott La Rock; KRS-One; Partner Lee Smith | D-Nice; DJ Scott La Rock; KRS-One | 5:10 |
| 3 | "9mm Goes Bang" | L. Parker; S. LaRock | DJ Scott La Rock; KRS-One; Partner Lee Smith | KRS-One | 4:18 |
| 4 | "Word from Our Sponsor" | L. Parker; S. LaRock | Ced Gee; DJ Scott La Rock; KRS-One; Partner Lee Smith | KRS-One | 3:52 |
| 5 | "Elementary" | L. Parker; S. LaRock | DJ Scott La Rock; KRS-One | DJ Scott La Rock; KRS-One | 4:07 |
| 6 | "Dope Beat" | L. Parker; S. LaRock | Ced Gee; DJ Scott La Rock; KRS-One; Partner Lee Smith | KRS-One; DJ Scott La Rock | 5:12 |
| 7 | "Remix for P Is Free" | L. Parker; S. LaRock | Ced Gee; DJ Scott La Rock; KRS-One | KRS-One | 4:20 |
| 8 | "The Bridge Is Over" | L. Parker; S. LaRock | Ced Gee; DJ Scott La Rock; KRS-One; Partner Lee Smith | KRS-One | 3:25 |
| 9 | "Super-Hoe" | L. Parker; S. LaRock | Ced Gee; DJ Scott La Rock; KRS-One | DJ Scott La Rock; KRS-One | 5:30 |
| 10 | "Criminal Minded" | L. Parker; S. LaRock | DJ Scott La Rock; KRS-One | KRS-One | 5:17 |
| 11 | "Scott LaRock Mega-Mix"* | S. LaRock | DJ Scott La Rock | DJ Scott La Rock | 6:49 |

[*] Bonus track found on later pressings.

== Charts ==
| Chart (1987) | Peak position |
|---|---|
| US Top R&B/Hip-Hop Albums (Billboard) | 73 |
