= Journeys by DJ =

UK compilation album series

Journeys by DJ originated as a UK dance music record label, which started as a series of DJ mix albums or mixtapes on the Music Unites label in 1992, and moved from London to New York City in 2000. Journeys by DJ was the first record label to focus exclusively on the art and format of the DJ mix, as opposed to singles, 12" singles, artist albums and compilations. As acclaimed in the authoritative Last Night a DJ Saved My Life: The Story of the Disc Jockey, Journeys by DJ (JDJ) was the first label to release full-length mixes of live DJ sets on CD. Other labels since the 70s released recordings of DJs spinning live, along with DJ-friendly vinyl "megamixes", and the 80s saw innumerable illegal mix tapes flood the market, but Journeys by DJ was the first label to set its stall out on the proposition that dance music is best heard in the mix, with high production values, and that the DJ can transcend the role of human jukebox to become a narrative artist and guide into the unknown.

== Journeys by DJ releases ==
Title	DJ	Label	Year	# of CDs
Journeys by DJ 01: In the Mix	Billy Nasty	JDJ	1993	1
Journeys by DJ 02: In the Mix	Judge Jules	JDJ	1993	1
Journeys by DJ 03: Party Mix	Danny Rampling	JDJ	1993	1
Journeys by DJ 04: Silky Mix	John Digweed	JDJ	1994	1
Journeys by DJ 05: Journey Through the Spectrum	Paul Oakenfold	JDJ	1994	1
Journeys by DJ 06: Ultimate House Party	Jay Chappell & Tim Fielding	JDJ	1994	1
Journeys by DJ 07	Rocky & Diesel	JDJ	1995	1
Journeys by DJ 08: 70 Minutes of Madness	Coldcut	JDJ	1995	1
Journeys by DJ 09: Ultimate Beach Party	Jay Chappell & Tim Fielding	JDJ	1995	1
Journeys by DJ 10: Dance Wars	Judge Jules; John Kelly	JDJ	1996	2
Journeys by DJ 11: CD Scape	Justin Robertson	JDJ	1996	2
Journeys by DJ 12: MusicMorphosis	Terry Farley; Pete Heller	JDJ	1996	2
Journeys by DJ 14: Triptonite	Jason Moore; Andrew Galea; Tomislav	JDJ	1997	3
Journeys by DJ 15: Desert Island Mix	Norman Jay; Gilles Peterson	JDJ	1997	2
Journeys by DJ 16: Latitude 40 Degree	Nicolas Matar	JDJ	2001	1
Journeys by DJ 17: Ley Lines 1	Tim Fielding	JDJ	2001	1
Journeys by DJ 18: Lightwave	John Selway	JDJ	2002	1
Journeys by DJ 19: Ultraviolet	Touche	JDJ	2002	1
Journeys by DJ 20: Sun Dance	Nicolas Matar	JDJ	2002	2
Journeys by DJ 21: Ley Lines 2	Journeyman (Tim Fielding)	JDJ	2007	MP3

== Journeys by DJ special releases ==
Title	DJ	Label	Year	# of CDs
Journeys by DJ: After Hours 1	Jay Chappell Tim Fielding Tim Reeves	JDJ	1995	1
Journeys by DJ: After Hours 2	Jay Chappell Tim Fielding Tim Reeves	JDJ	1996	1
Journeys into Jungle	DJ Trace	JDJ	1995	2
Journeys Through the Land of Drum and Bass	DJ Rap	JDJ	1995	1
Journeys by DJ: Alive At Pride '96	Jay Chappell; Martin Confusion	JDJ	1996	1
Journeys by DJ: Marathon	Coldcut; Paul Oakenfold; John Digweed; DJ Rap	JDJ	1996	2
Sounds Under New York	Rus Deep; David Sambor	JDJ	2003	1

== Journeys by DJ International releases ==
Title	DJ	Label	Year	# of CDs
Journeys by DJ International 01	Keoki	JDJ	1994	1
Journeys by DJ International 02	DJ Duke	JDJ	1994	1
Journeys by DJ International 03: The Spiritual Mix	Dimitri	JDJ	1995	1
Journeys by DJ International 04: Ich Bin Ein Bass-Liner, The Purism Mix	WestBam	JDJ	1996	1

== Journeys by DJ promotional releases ==
Title	DJ	Label	Year	# of CDs
Journeys by DJ: Smokin Mix	Jay Chappell	JDJ	1996	1
Journeys by DJ: Rhythm Method	Nicolas Matar; Willie Graff	JDJ	2003	1
Journeys by DJ: Cinnamon	Supreme Beings of Leisure	JDJ	2003	1
