= Jockey Slut =

Defunct British music magazine

- Editor: John "Johnno" Burgess/Paul Benney(1993-1999); Rob Wood (1999-2001); Paul Mardles (2001-2004)
- Categories: Music, Culture
- Frequency: Bimonthy (1993-1999); Monthly (2000-2003); Quarterly (2004)
- Founded: 1993
- First issue: January 1993
- Final issue Number: March 2004; Vol. 7 No. 2
- Company: Self-published (1993-1999); Swinstead Publishing (1999-2004)
- Country: United Kingdom
- Language: English
- ISSN: 1360-5798

Jockey Slut was a British music magazine which ran between 1993 and 2004, focusing mainly on dance music and club culture. It started as a self-published bi-monthly fanzine in 1993, and became a monthly by 1999, following a buy-out by Swinstead Publishing. By 2004, it was published quarterly, with more content on its website, a change which only lasted three and a half months before closure in late May that year.

== History ==
=== Manchester (1993-1999) ===
According to co-founder John "Johnno" Burgess, he and Paul Benney (the other founder of the magazine) intended Jockey Slut to just be a slogan for a T-shirt. The expression was coined while both were studying at Manchester Polytechnic University (currently Manchester Metropolitan University) and frequenting the city's clubbing scene, notably at The Haçienda. The two main inspirations for it were Manic Street Preachers' recurrent slogan "culture slut" and the increasing attention DJs were getting from fans at the time. Burgess said: "Disc jockeys were attracting as many groupies as pop stars. Except, unluckily for the DJs, their groupies were usually after one thing; the name of the label that wicked tune was on".

Starting out as a bi-monthly fanzine, Jockey Slut increased its readership. With dance music and club culture steadily growing in popularity and the subsequent advent of superclubs with superstar DJs, bigger and better distributed magazines like Mixmag, Muzik and DJMag started to focus more on the rock and roll-like aspects of clubbing (namely the recurrent drugs features), while devoting less space to the music itself, rather than covering newer sounds and artists. Jockey Slut responded to this by adopting a more music-centered coverage, with a writing tone that aimed to strike a balance between witty, opinionated fanzine-style writing and an irreverent sense of humour inspired by the success of pop magazine Smash Hits. Jockey Slut also aimed to be more risky in its choices. In 1993, the magazine gave The Chemical Brothers (while they were still called Dust Brothers) their first interview. Two years later, around the time of the release of their debut album, Exit Planet Dust, Jockey Slut gave them their first magazine cover. In 1994, Detroit techno musician and Underground Resistance’s leader “Mad” Mike Banks granted a rare exclusive interview, and was also given his first magazine cover. Daft Punk also had their first interview in the magazine in 1993.

Jockey Slut also gave space to some rock and indie, giving prominent space to bands like Nirvana, Blur or Beck as much as they would any dance or electronic act. Jockey Slut’s tagline was “Disco Pogo For Punks In Pumps”, a line stolen from an old Smash Hits review, according to Burgess. Its coverage of Urban styles such as hip-hop and R&B was also more frequent than the average dance magazine of the time.

In 1995, American underwear company Jockey threatened a lawsuit, claiming the magazine's name could be hurtful to their image. The suit was settled out of court, with Jockey Slut authorized to keep its name, but forced to remove the word “jockey” from its merchandising.

In 1996, Jockey Slut was redesigned to incorporate full colour. Daft Punk had their first magazine cover in that issue, and also their last unmasked photographs since. The band thought the printing made the magazine look like a low-rent pornographic magazine, prompting Daft Punk not to pose for any future photographs unless they were wearing masks or disguised themselves as robots, a decision they have maintained since.

In 1997, Jockey Slut carried an in-depth feature on German label International DeeJay Gigolo, prior to the short-lived electroclash craze which happened four to five years later.

=== London (1999-2004) ===
In 1999, Jockey Slut was sold to Swinstead Publishing, to expand its distribution and take the magazine to a monthly format. With this change the magazine set up in London and Burgess stepped down as editor to become the magazine's editorial director. Rob Wood essentially maintained the same tone and music coverage policy, but with aesthetic changes to both writing and visual contents. Superclub culture was hitting its peak at the time. Boards of Canada got their first magazine cover ever in 2000, and The Avalanches also had theirs a year later, almost four months ahead of the release of their debut album, Since I Left You. Throughout these years, artists including The Streets, Erol Alkan, Junior Boys, Kasabian, Audio Bullys, Headman or Danger Mouse got early support through the magazine.

By 2002, some longtime readers started to complain that the magazine was giving cover space to acts like The Rapture, 2 Many DJs or The Neptunes and increasing the rock coverage, with features on acts like Mogwai and The Polyphonic Spree, retro pieces on My Bloody Valentine or Talking Heads, and giving critical praise to acts like The White Stripes. The January 2004 issue had Luke Steele of alternative rockers The Sleepy Jackson on the cover. Burgess started Jockey Slut's 10-year anniversary dissertation, "Blowing Our Own Trumpet", with the following line: "Paul liked the Pixies, I liked Prince, but - like most 22 year olds in 1992 - we had a shared love of 'dance' music, which meant anything from the poppy KLF to heavy Belgian techno".

In January 2004, with Paul Mardles as editor since 2002, Jockey Slut changed to a quarterly while increasing its Internet presence, creating a webzine with daily updated content such as news, features and reviews. The print magazine featured more in-depth material and selected highlights from the quarter past and anticipating some from the next, with its publication dates chosen to coincide with key periods in the music industry like the Spring, the Summer festivals, the Autumn and Christmas/Year-end.
