= Mr. Magic =

- Born: John Rivas; March 15, 1956; The Bronx, New York City, U.S.
- Died: October 2, 2009 (aged 53)
- Genres: Hip-hop; electro
- Occupation: DJ
- Instrument: Turntables
- Years active: 1979–2002
- Labels: Magic; Profile
- Formerly of: Juice Crew

John "Mr. Magic" Rivas (March 15, 1956 – October 2, 2009) was a Puerto Rican hip-hop radio DJ.

== Career ==
Mr. Magic debuted in 1979 on WHBI in New York City with “Disco Showcase” on the pay-for-time FM station. In 1982, Magic teamed with Frankie Crocker, program manager for Inner City Broadcasting, in a move to commercial powerhouse WBLS with the first exclusive rap radio show to be aired on a major station. Rap Attack, Magic's show featured Marley Marl as the DJ and Tyrone "Fly Ty" Williams as the show's co-producer. Magic moved full-time to WBLS in July 1982. His reign on the New York City airwaves lasted six years and was instrumental in broadening the scope and validity of hip-hop music. Mr. Magic recorded one 12" single as an artist "Magic's Message (There's A Better Way)", produced by Spyder D for Posse Records in 1984. He is also interviewed in the 1986 cult documentary Big Fun In The Big Town.

During the mid-80s there was a rivalry between Mr. Magic and Kool DJ Red Alert, who hosted a weekly show on WRKS-FM. The feud also played out between proxy rap groups, the Juice Crew and Boogie Down Productions (see The Bridge Wars). The Juice Crew – headed by Mr. Magic's on-air assistant, DJ Marley Marl – was named after one of Magic's aliases, "Sir Juice."

In 2002 Magic lent his voice to Grand Theft Auto: Vice City, as himself, a DJ on one of the in-game radio stations.

Magic died of a heart attack on October 2, 2009, at the age of 53.
