= Barry Mayo =

American radio executive

Barry Mayo is an American former radio executive. In 1981, he helped launch WRKS in New York as the first station to play rap. The station's success led him to be promoted as the first black general manager of RKO General.

In 2003, he succeeded Judy Ellis as general manager of Emmis Radio New York; the first African-American general manager of Emmis Broadcasting. In this role he oversaw WRKS (now an Urban Adult Contemporary outlet) as well as WQHT (Hot 97) and WQCD.

In 2007, Mayo was named President of Radio of Silver Spring, Maryland-based Radio One, the nation's premier black owned broadcasting company.

He attended and graduated from Brooklyn Technical High School. He is a graduate of Howard University. While he attended Howard he was noted for being the first general manager of its current college station WHBC 830 AM, or otherwise known as the voice of Howard's Black Communicators.

Mayo is also an accomplished photographer, having first studied photography with Jno Cook at Columbia College Chicago. His photographs have been featured in several exhibitions and publications. He is currently making documentary films focused on identity issues amongst mixed race individuals.
