= How We Gonna Make the Black Nation Rise? =

Song by Brother D with Collective Effort
- Released: 1980
- Studio: A&R Studios
- Genre: Hip hop
- Label: Clappers
- Songwriters: Daryl Aamaa Nubyahn, S. Lynn
- Producers: Locksley Grant, Pierre Brook

"How We Gonna Make the Black Nation Rise?" is a 1980 hip hop song by Brother D with Collective Effort. Released on the independent label Clappers, it is considered the first political hip hop song. Like the content of the song, the label Clappers Records was developed by Lister Hewan-Lowe who wanted to create a label to release politically motivated music. While working for Island Records, he reached out to reggae musicians involved in the hip hop music world in New York City to find someone who wanted to record a political record. He met with Daryl Aamaa Nubyahn, who wrote lyrics for the song and agreed to meet with him at A&R Studios to record it. On meeting at the studio, Nubyahn had invited several people to record the verses with him who were known as Collective Effort.

== Production ==
=== Background ===
Clappers was a record label in New York City created by Lister Hewan-Lowe. Hewan-Howe was influenced by Gil Scott-Heron's involvement with the record label Strata-East Records. He stated that "I got revved up and excited about the possibilities of forming a record company that had a Maoist approach instead of a capitalist approach, I was obsessed with the fact that shareholders should be the people who made the music." Hewan-Howe initially began making the label Yard Records and Yard Music, one of the first reggae record companies in the United States. Hewan-Howe later gave Yard Records and the label Yard Music to his close friend and classmate at Mico Practising School in Kingston Jamaica Augustus Pablo as a gift and started Clappers Records, a label whose name had three meanings: in Jamaican Patois, it means that if someone clapped your music, it meant somebody ripped it off, it meant that you took a gun and shot someone, and it also meant you just had sex.

=== Development ===
After proposing the idea of making a "revolutionary hip hop record", Hewan-Howe began approaching reggae people that were involved in rap music in New York and was looking for "the most militant political activists to record for Clappers Records". Daryl Aamaa Nubyahn, also known as Brother D, went to Island Records where Hewan-Howe was working and introduced himself by saying that they will never record his records because "nobody wants to record it because it's too political, too militant." Hewan-Howe disagreed, offering him a copy of the album Rastaman Vibration which was released by Island. Nubyahn had written lyrics for a song and suggested a Philadelphia based record to be on the rhythm section which Hewan-Howe turned down.

Hewan-Howe went to A&R Studios to record the song and expected only Nubyahn to show up only to find what he described as "an army of people" arriving which Nubyahn introduced as the "Collective Effort". The record was the first to be both explicitly political in both its lyrical content and its methods of production and distribution. The lyrics of the song are performed by unnamed male and female rappers with lyrics encouraging listeners to consider the "good time music" and the actual reality of the situation is derived from. The music used on the record taken from Cheryl Lynn's song "Got to be Real".

== Release and reception ==
"How We Gonna Make the Black Nation Rise?" was released in 1980 on Clappers Records. The single was reviewed in Village Voice in 1982, where the reviewer praised it, noting the group for its serious and intelligent message and skillful rapping.

== Track listing ==
12" single (CL-0001)

1. "Dib-Be-Dib-Be-Dize"
2. "How We Gonna Make The Black Nation Rise?"

== Credits ==
Credits are adapted from the record sticker.

- Daryl Aamaa Nubyahn – composer
- S. Lynn – composer
- Clappers International – executive producer Lissa Jonap Hewan-Lowe
- Locksley Grant – producer
- Pierre Brook – producer

== See also ==
- 1980 in hip hop music
