= WEPN-FM =

Bilingual adult contemporary radio station in New York City

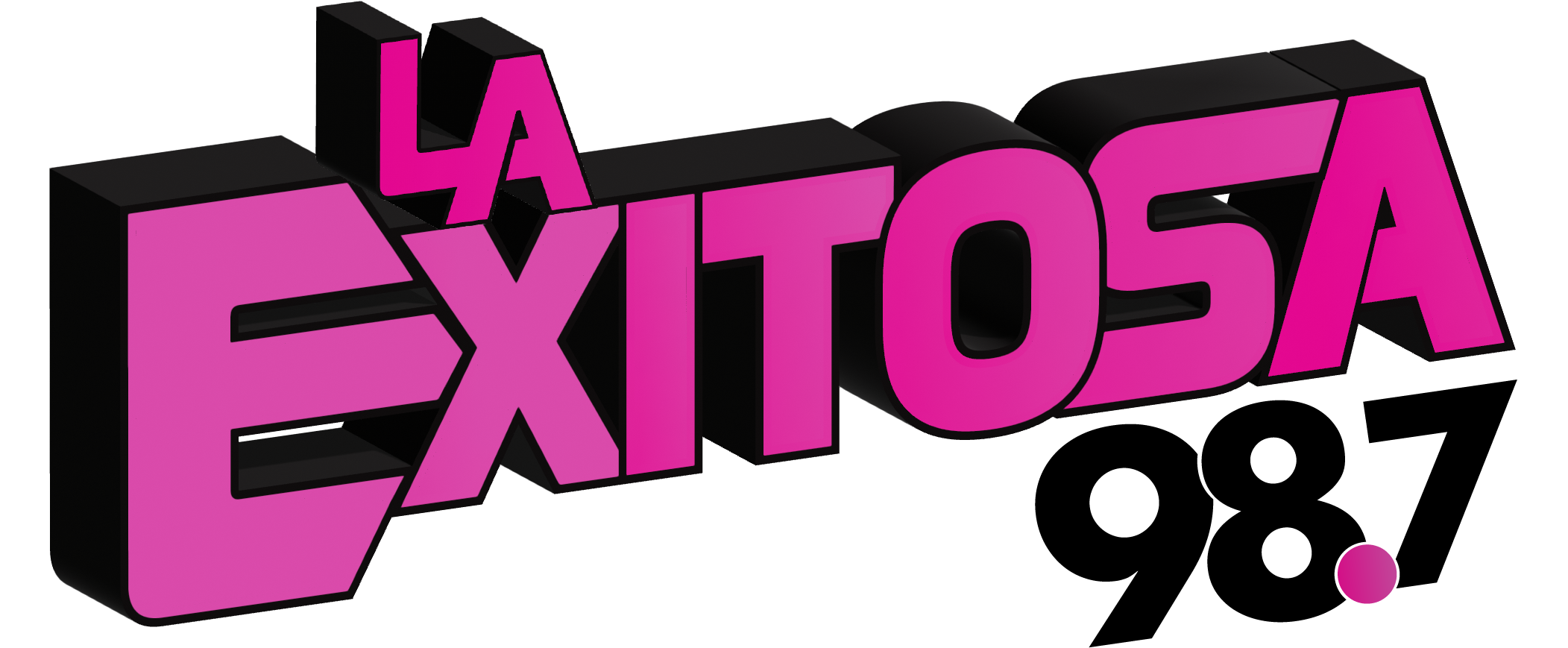
- New York, New York; United States
- Broadcast area: New York metropolitan area
- Frequency: 98.7 MHz (HD Radio)
- Branding: La Exitosa 98.7

Programming
- Language: Spanglish
- Format: Latin pop; adult contemporary music

Ownership
- Owner: Emmis Corporation; (Emmis New York Radio License LLC)
- Sister stations: WLIB

History
- First air date: April 1, 1941
- Former call signs: W71NY (1941–1943); WOR-FM (1943); WBAM (1943–1948); WOR-FM (1948–1972); WXLO (1972–1981); WRKS-FM (1981–2012)
- Call sign meaning: ESPN Radio (previous affiliation)

Technical information
- Licensing authority: FCC
- Facility ID: 63781
- Class: B
- ERP: 6,000 watts
- HAAT: 415 meters (1,362 ft)
- Transmitter coordinates: 40.748°N 73.986°W
- Repeater: 1190 WLIB (New York)

Links
- Public license information: Public file; LMS
- Webcast: Listen live
- Website: www.laexitosa987.com

WEPN-FM (98.7 FM, "La Exitosa 98.7") is a radio station in New York City, owned by Emmis Corporation. The station carries a Spanish-language format with a gold-based mix of Latin pop and English-language adult contemporary music. The station's transmitter is located at the Empire State Building.

WEPN-FM originally began operations as an experimental FM station in 1939, spun off from 710 WOR. It then became one of the first licensed commercial FM stations in 1941. Until 1965, when the FCC prohibited this practice in larger markets, the station served as an FM simulcast of WOR. At that time, the station—by then owned by RKO General—flipped to one of New York's first free-form radio formats, focusing on progressive rock. In 1974, it adopted a top 40 format. Amid declining listenership, the station briefly adopted an adult contemporary format modeled after Chicago sister WFYR in 1980.

Beginning in December 1980, after further declines in ratings under the AC format, the station began to transition to a format focusing primarily on dance music (such as disco) and R&B; the format officially launched in August 1981, with the station becoming WRKS-FM, and adopting the branding Kiss FM. The new rhythmic contemporary format was immediately successful. In 1983, WRKS became the first station in New York City to regularly play hip hop, furthering its success. Amid the golden age of hip hop, WRKS-FM was New York's highest-rated radio station for a period.

After RKO General's exit from the broadcasting industry in the late 1980s, the station was sold to Atlanta-based Summit Communications Group in 1989. WRKS was, in turn, acquired by Emmis Communications—the owner of its rival WQHT—in 1994, forming the first duopoly in New York City radio. In defense of the urban contemporary format of WQHT, Emmis flipped WRKS to an urban adult contemporary format focusing primarily on R&B, while maintaining the Kiss branding.

In 2012, the Kiss brand came to an end when Emmis leased the station to The Walt Disney Company under a 12-year local marketing agreement (LMA). The station flipped to sports radio as WEPN-FM, the flagship of the ESPN Radio network. The LMA was transferred to Good Karma Brands (GKB) in 2021, which continued the ESPN Radio format. In August 2024, the LMA with GKB expired; as a result, WEPN-FM's programming was migrated to the former WCBS under a new LMA between GKB and Audacy, while WEPN-FM flipped to an interim hot adult contemporary format. On January 10, 2025, WEPN flipped to a Spanish-language format with a focus on Latin and English pop hits.

== History ==
=== Experimental operations (1939–1941) ===
In the late 1930s, WOR (710 AM), then licensed to Newark, New Jersey, and owned by the Bamberger Broadcasting Service, Inc., a division of R.H. Macy and Company, became interested in the newly developed technology of FM radio. In the summer of 1939, WOR engineers, working with Bell Telephone engineers, set up an experimental 1,000-watt transmitter in Carteret, New Jersey, with the call sign W2XWI. In June 1940 experimental operations were moved to 444 Madison Avenue in New York City, now operating under the call sign W2XOR.

=== As W71NY (1941–1943) ===
The Federal Communications Commission (FCC) began permitting commercial operations by FM stations in 1941, and Bamberger's New York station was included among the first authorizations made for the original FM band at 42 to 50 MHz. The station was given the call sign W71NY, which reflected its operation at 47.1 MHz.

=== As WBAM (1943–1948) ===
Effective November 1, 1943, the FCC updated its call letter policy to allow FM stations to have call signs similar to those used on the AM band. The station initially chose WOR-FM, but six weeks later changed it on December 14 to WBAM. In 1945 the FM band was moved to higher frequencies, and WBAM was initially reassigned to 96.5 MHz, before moving to 98.7 MHz in October 1947.

=== As WOR-FM (1948–1972) ===
The WOR-FM logo from the late 1960s.

WBAM changed its call sign to WOR-FM on June 13, 1948. Like most early FM stations, the station initially simulcast AM sister station WOR. Macy's/Bamberger sold the WOR stations (which launched a television station in October 1949) to the General Tire and Rubber Company in 1952. General Tire reorganized its broadcasting division into RKO General in 1957. WOR-FM simulcast its AM sister station's full service Talk/MOR format.

In 1965, the Federal Communications Commission ordered AM stations in large markets to end continuous simulcasting on co-owned FM frequencies, a move made to spark development of FM stations as individual entities. On July 30, 1966, WOR-FM began running a freeform-based progressive rock format for most of its broadcast day, though the station continued to simulcast WOR radio's morning program Rambling with Gambling for a time afterwards. Under the leadership of legendary disc jockey Murray "the K" Kaufman, and featuring other notable disc jockeys such as Scott Muni and Rosko, the freeform format was the first of its kind in New York City radio. Later, Muni and Rosko departed for WNEW-FM, where the same progressive format would become a huge success.

Initially, the Drake-Chenault-consulted, Top 40-formatted WOR-FM played new songs but in less of a rotation than WABC, which was then New York's big Top 40 station. Some of the notable early personalities included Bill Brown (who was a holdover from the rock format and would leave for then-rock station WCBS-FM in 1969); Joe McCoy (who would later become general manager of WCBS-FM); Johnny Donovan (who would go to WABC in 1972 and remain there until his 2015 retirement); Tommy Edwards, later the longtime midday personality on Chicago Top 40 giant WLS (AM); and Al Brady (who would program WABC in 1979), among others.

=== As WXLO (1972–1981) ===
On October 23, 1972, RKO General changed the station's call sign to WXLO, and starting in April 1974, it became known as 99X, a reference to the WXLO frequency's close proximity on the FM dial to 99 MHz. This was a version of what was known as the "Q" format, so named because it was modeled after station KCBQ in San Diego. The format featured about 15-20 currents, with a heavy emphasis on constant contests and promotions.

In 1976, WXLO held a contest in which listeners had to guess the identity of six Beatles songs blended together in a sound montage. The Beatles montage was about three seconds in duration and contained one or two notes of each of the songs. They were "Hey Jude", "Got to Get You into My Life", "Day Tripper", "Come Together", "Do You Want to Know a Secret", and "Ticket to Ride". The station announced that the contest winner was from Tappan, New York. The prize was a Rock-Ola jukebox stocked with Beatles 45s. The station also once held an all-Elton John weekend. Listeners had to count how many Elton songs were played and win his Greatest Hits Vol. 1 album. Another weekend they held a "No Bee Gees" weekend, where they asked their listeners to request Bee Gee songs that they did not want played. "I'll be sure to not get that on the air for you" a DJ said on that weekend.

WXLO evolved to a younger skewing Top 40 format and the "99X" moniker remained until late 1979, when it became "FM 99 WXLO". This iteration had decent ratings for a while, but by the spring of 1980, the ratings fell dramatically. RKO General phased out the Top 40 format, and brought in new program director Don Kelly from successful sister soft adult contemporary WFYR in Chicago in an attempt to duplicate that format's success on WXLO. The station at first attempted a call letter change back to WOR-FM, but an FCC challenge from competing crosstown WRFM (now WWPR-FM) prevented the call letter change from happening. Still, Kelly attempted to make the station the same adult contemporary format he had in Chicago. These changes did not gain any new listeners for WXLO, and ratings sank even lower. Later, Kelly adjusted the music and very slowly and gradually began mixing more disco and soul into the format. In the fall of 1980, Kelly, in consultation with RKO General, decided to go after WBLS-FM's urban audience and WKTU's Rhythmic audience by bringing in new music director Barry Mayo. Mayo, shortly before his arrival, suggested a new format for the station to Kelly and then-general manager Lee S. Simonson after he received a surprising lambasting from his idol, WBLS Program Director Frankie Crocker (who would later become his rival). Mayo would later become WXLO's program director when Kelly left to start his own consultancy.

By December 1980, the station was leaning towards Disco and R&B. The station dropped American Top 40 in January 1981. The evolution was gradual, and by May 1981, WXLO was nearly all rhythmic, playing almost all disco, soul, and rhythmic-friendly pop. Almost all the rock and AC crossovers were gone. By today's standards, this station would be called "Rhythmic CHR", but that term did not exist back in 1981. Therefore, the station was classified as "Urban Contemporary" (which today would be considered as a strictly R&B-type format whether Rap or Soul).

=== As WRKS-FM (1981–2012) ===
==== Enter "Kiss FM" (1981–1994) ====
WRKS logo from 1981 to 1994

In June 1981, the station was known on-air as "FM 99 WXLO making its move to 98.7". By the middle of July, the station had changed its call sign to WRKS-FM (the meaning of which originally referred to its being an RKO Station) and adopted the on-air brand 98.7 Kiss FM, as the station's transition to this new urban contemporary format was completed by that August. The first song on "Kiss FM" was Make That Move by Shalamar. Early on, WRKS played a great deal of R&B and dance music, and became an almost instant hit with listeners, as its ratings skyrocketed from 22nd place to third. Notable Kiss FM Mixmasters at the time Shep Pettibone and, later, Tony Humphries, were commissioned to create longer versions of current popular songs. Longtime urban contemporary leader WBLS was caught off-guard by the sudden rise of the new station, which represented its first direct competition in that format.

Around mid-1983, the station approached Afrika Bambaataa about an underground hip hop music show. He liked the idea and appointed DJ Jazzy Jay, a fellow member of Zulu Nation. He then passed the gig on to his cousin, DJ Red Alert. In Fall 1983, WRKS became the first station in the United States to play rap music in regular rotation. Also that year, non-R&B dance music and disco were phased out, as the station played strictly music catering mainly to an African-American audience. WBLS responded by hiring Mr. Magic to conduct a weekend rap show, which helped WBLS reach number-three in the ratings that year, beating out WRKS. Nevertheless, the station had made such strides in its first two-and-a-half years that it resulted in Barry Mayo being promoted as general manager, the first African-American to hold such a position in the RKO radio chain.

WRKS incorporated artists such as Kurtis Blow, Whodini, Run DMC, Fat Boys, LL Cool J, and Public Enemy into the same rotation as such established acts as Ashford & Simpson, Kool and the Gang, and Gladys Knight. In 1986, Indianapolis-based Emmis Communications launched WQHT (then at 103.5 FM), which had an early emphasis on dance music, forcing WRKS and WBLS to add more dance music to their playlists again. In 1988, Mayo left to organize a new broadcasting company with Lee S. Simonson and Bill Pearson, and RKO appointed Charles Warfield (former general manager of WBLS) as the new general manager of WRKS. With Vinny Brown as the station's program director, WRKS became the No. 1 radio station in the largest media market in the world for six years right through the mid 1990s.

By the late 1980s, however, RKO General was forced out of the broadcasting business when the FCC began revoking its licenses to its radio and television stations in New York, Boston and Los Angeles because of gross misconduct and lack of candor on the part of its corporate parent, the General Tire and Rubber Company. Having already been stripped in 1982 of its license to WNAC-TV in Boston, RKO was left with no choice but to break up its broadcasting unit. In New York City, RKO's three stations were sold to different companies during a two-year period beginning in 1987. Two years after WOR-TV went to MCA (and renamed WWOR-TV), on June 26, 1989, RKO sold WRKS to the Summit Communications Group of Atlanta. Around the same time, WOR radio was sold to Buckley Broadcasting.

That same year, WBLS lured on-air personality Mike Love (formerly of the original Kiss Wake-Up Club) to their morning drive show. WRKS immediately formulated a new morning show featuring Ken "Spider" Webb and Jeff Foxx along with then-unknown Wendy Williams. (Foxx and Webb would continue on for the next several years, while Williams held various shifts on the station.)

For many years, WRKS was number one in the Arbitron ratings due to its hip hop-influenced format. WRKS was also the first radio station in the United States to embrace dancehall and reggae music by adding Dahved Levy to do a Sunday night reggae show with Sting International. The battle between WRKS and WBLS continued into the 1990s, but a major turning point occurred in the spring of 1994, when WQHT changed formats from dance music to primarily hip-hop by luring "Funk Master Flex" away from WRKS, who, at the time, was a fill-in DJ for "DJ Red Alert" when Red Alert was out on tour or making appearances, thus competing directly with WRKS. WRKS responded by adding "The Bomb Squad Mix Show", hosted by "The N.O." (also known as "The Native One") featuring "DJ Enuff", "DJ Ace", and "Supernatural the Freestyle Fanatic". The Bomb Squad began "breaking" hot new hip-hop artists and ushering in the "Golden Era of Hip Hop". The Bomb Squad was the first hip-hop mix show in the country to play the records of The Notorious B.I.G., Wu Tang Clan, and Mobb Deep. The Bomb Squad introduced its signature "bomb dropping" whistle sound effect as they played exclusive new hip-hop music and produced fresh remixes not heard on other urban stations across the country. Leaning towards a younger demographic, the station formulated a new morning show featuring Wendy Williams, who was replaced by "The Native One" during her former 6 p.m.-10 p.m. weeknights shift.

Based on WRKS's success, several radio stations in other markets began to use the "Kiss FM" moniker for branding the station itself or its format. In the case of WRKS, the branding was grandfathered even as Clear Channel Communications trademarked "Kiss FM" for its use on its mainstream top 40 pop stations in the late 1990s, largely based on KIIS-FM in Los Angeles, whose "KIIS" name was trademarked by prior owner Gannett Company in 1986.

==== "Smooth R&B and Classic Soul" (1995–2012) ====
In December 1994, WQHT's parent Emmis Communications took advantage of newly relaxed FCC ownership regulations and agreed to purchase WRKS from Summit, forming the market's first FM duopoly. WRKS subsequently stopped playing hip-hop and flipped to urban adult contemporary format using the slogan "Smooth R&B and Classic Soul". The shift in format resulted in notable personalities associated with the previous format, such as Wendy Williams and Red Alert, moving from WRKS to WQHT. The new sound on WRKS was introduced by the station during its annual "Twelve Days of Kiss-mas" promotion during the Christmas holiday, and was fully implemented in January 1995. Soul music legend Barry White became the station's imaging voice and promotional face, and would remain in this role until his death in 2003.

In September 1995, WRKS hired another deep-voiced bass singer, Isaac Hayes, as its new morning show host, and later added Ashford & Simpson to helm its afternoon drive program. Funk musician Roger Troutman (of the band Zapp) and former disc jockey-turned-motivational speaker Les Brown also hosted programs on WRKS around this time.

WRKS's playlist for its first year consisted almost exclusively of songs from the 1960s and 1970s; after 1996, the station began reintroducing current R&B back into rotation. But in 1999, WRKS switched from a classic soul-based Urban AC format to a mostly current R&B format. That same year, Frankie Crocker was hired as an announcer and a weekend DJ. The station slowly began to reintroduce rap in 2000. When WWPR-FM was launched in March 2002, the station shifted back to classic soul. In 2003, Barry Mayo briefly returned as general manager for WRKS, WQHT and jazz-formatted WQCD (now WFAN-FM), and WRKS returned to its full-fledged Urban AC format.

In April 2001, WRKS became the New York home for the nationally syndicated Tom Joyner Morning Show, as Isaac Hayes chose not to renew his contract with the station; he remained for a few months to host the local segments within the program (known on the station as The Tom Joyner Morning Show with Isaac Hayes). Joyner's first stint on WRKS lasted only two years. D. L. Hughley was brought on to host The D. L. Hughley Morning Show in July 2009. Emmis planned to syndicate the show, but after a dispute between Emmis and a proposed distributor over who would pay his salary, Hughley left the station and the program was cancelled on August 7, 2010. The station picked up Joyner's program again in 2011. In 2003, author and "relationship expert" Michael Baisden became host of the afternoon show, which later became syndicated nationally in January 2005.

In early September 2010, the slogan for the station, "Old School & Today's R&B", changed to "'80s, '90s & Today's R&B", which included dropping most pre-1979 titles. This would later change to "Classic Soul & Today's R&B", which would last until the station's demise in 2012.

Following the death of Whitney Houston—who was born in nearby Newark, New Jersey—on February 11, 2012, WRKS dedicated the subsequent weekend to commemorating her career, including tributes by the station's staff and alumni, and listener phone-ins.

Notable station personalities during the Kiss years included:

- Barry Mayo (1981)
- Jazzy Jay (1983)
- Shep Pettibone (Mastermixer) (1981–1984)
- DJ Chuck Chillout (1982–1989)
- Tony Humphries (1982–1994)
- Wendy Williams (1989–1994)
- Ashford & Simpson (1995–1999)
- Roberta Flack (1995–1999)
- Isaac Hayes (1996–2001)
- Kool DJ Red Alert (Mastermixer) (1983–1994; 2007–2012)
- Tom Joyner (2001–2003; 2011–2012)
- Michael Baisden (2003–2012)
- DJ Cocoa Chanelle (Mastermixer) (2011–2012)
- Ed Lover (2011–2012)

=== ESPN Radio (2012–2024) ===
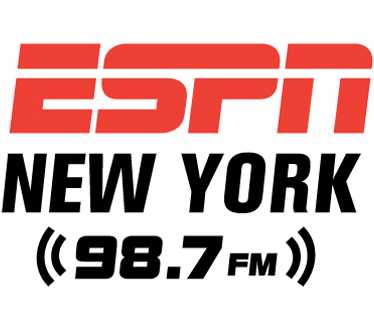
Logo as "ESPN New York" (2012-2024)

On April 26, 2012, the Walt Disney Company and Emmis Communications agreed to a 12-year-lease of the 98.7 FM frequency for an undisclosed price. YMF Media (which acquired WBLS' parent Inner City Broadcasting Corporation) acquired the intellectual property and trademarks of WRKS, primarily the New York City market rights to "Kiss-FM". As a result, Kiss signed off on the 30th with a goodbye show featuring all of the remaining airstaff, and went off the air at midnight, with "Brother's Gonna Work It Out" by Willie Hutch being the last song on Kiss. Immediately after, ESPN Radio began broadcasting on 98.7 FM under a local marketing agreement with the Walt Disney Company. Inner City/YMF also moved WBLS and its AM sister station WLIB into WRKS's former office/studio space at Emmis' New York broadcast facility.

The 98.7 frequency simulcast WEPN, the ESPN owned-and-operated AM station, until September 7, 2012, when the AM station switched over to ESPN Deportes Radio full-time. After the closure of ESPN Deportes Radio in 2019, the AM station became a passthrough for overflow programming, including the national ESPN Radio weekday schedule.

The station's call sign changed to WEPN-FM on May 14, 2012, to match the AM call sign. YMF Media then transferred the WRKS call sign to the ESPN Radio affiliate in the Jackson, Mississippi area.

In December 2021, Beaver Dam, Wisconsin-based Good Karma Brands—an operator of ESPN Radio affiliates in other markets—announced that it would acquire operational control of WEPN-FM from Disney/ESPN, with Good Karma assuming the remainder of Disney's lease agreement with Emmis Communications; Emmis maintains ownership of the station's license. In the same transaction, Good Karma purchased full ownership of WEPN (AM) and ESPN Radio-owned stations in Chicago and Los Angeles from Disney.

=== End of ESPN Radio LMA, TJ 98.7 (2024–2025) ===
Logo as "TJ 98.7" (2024-2025)

On September 19, 2023, GKB owner Craig Karmazin told the New York Post that it would not renew the LMA with Emmis when it expired and would thus relinquish the 98.7 FM frequency on August 31, 2024. GKB had made an offer to acquire WEPN-FM outright, but talks with Emmis were unproductive. The original plan was to consolidate WEPN-FM's local programming onto 1050 AM, and direct users to the ESPN New York digital platform for overflow programming. However, on August 12, 2024, GKB instead announced that it would enter into an LMA with Audacy's 880 WCBS beginning August 26, replacing its all-news format with WEPN-FM's former programming as WHSQ.

After the expiration of the LMA, WEPN-FM's operations would be returned to Emmis; it planned to carry a music-based format on 98.7 in the interim, pending the search for a new operator or the outright sale of the station. Shortly before the expiration, Emmis would reach an agreement with syndicate United Stations Radio Networks to provide interim programming for WEPN-FM; plans were made for the programming to be anchored by The TJ Show —a United Stations-distributed show hosted by former WHTZ Elvis Duran and the Morning Show co-host TJ Taormina. The station's on-air imaging and programming was developed in around a week, which would be automated and voice-tracked using the Radio.Cloud platform to integrate localized content.

At midnight on August 31, 2024, WEPN-FM abruptly ended its ESPN Radio programming (to the point that it joined "Shut Up and Dance" by Walk the Moon already in progress) and flipped to hot adult contemporary as TJ 98.7. The format was intended as being temporary from its start, with promos billing the "TJ" format as a "pop-up" radio station that would be "here... until we're not"; The TJ Show would air twice daily during morning and afternoon drive for the run of the format.

=== La Exitosa (2025–present) ===
On January 8, 2025, it was announced that the TJ 98.7 format would end, with the station airing promos inviting listeners to tune in at 6:00 p.m. on January 10, 2025 "to hear what's next". At that time, following a live farewell show hosted by Taormina, both WEPN-FM and sister AM station WLIB relaunched as the Spanish-language La Exitosa. Similarly to stations such as WMIA-FM in Miami, the station carries a gold-based mix of English-language adult contemporary hits and Latin pop, with programming and imaging conducted in Spanish. The new format continued to use Radio.Cloud, and later added on-air personalities (including market veteran Gloria B, who had moved from WPAT-FM). The new format has been moderately successful, with WEPN reaching a 2.1 share by October 2025.
