= The Bridge Wars =

New York hip hop rivalry

The Bridge Wars was a hip-hop music rivalry during the mid-to-late 1980s and early 1990s, that arose from a dispute over the true birthplace of hip-hop music and retaliation over the rejecting of a record for airplay. The Bridge Wars originally involved two groups from different boroughs of New York City: the South Bronx's Boogie Down Productions, led by KRS-One; and Marley Marl's Juice Crew, hailing from Queensbridge in Long Island City, Queens. KRS-One and Marley Marl have since officially retired the feud, with the release of their collaborative 2007 album Hip Hop Lives.

== 1985–1986: Origins ==
The feud began with Queensbridge-based producer Marley Marl & MC Shan's track "The Bridge" in late 1985. The track recited the praises of their home borough and some of its earlier rap crews, and was taken to imply that Queensbridge was the origin of hip-hop.

The lyrics that apparently raised the issue were:

You love to hear the story, again and again,
Of how it all got started way back when,
The monument is right in your face,
Sit and listen for a while to the name of the place,
The Bridge,
Queensbridge

Though MC Shan states Queensbridge is where his crew originated and is his birthplace, he has stated that he never meant the song to say that Queensbridge is the birthplace of hip-hop at all, "everyone knows that hip-hop was started in the West Bronx." Statements can be found in the 2003 documentary Beef, which features the original battle footage.

In response, South Bronx-based KRS-One and Boogie Down Productions released the track "South Bronx" in 1986, which was similar in terms of content to Shan and Marl's track except singing the praises of the South Bronx rather than Queensbridge, and made the argument for its being the real birthplace of hip-hop. The song first premiered at a concert where MC Shan had just performed "The Bridge". The track directly attacks MC Shan with lyrics like:

Party people in the place to be, KRS-One attacks,
Ya got dropped off MCA 'cause the rhymes you wrote was wack,
So you think that hip-hop had its start out in Queensbridge,
If you popped that junk up in the Bronx you might not live.

Before "The Bridge" was released, MC Shan was signed to MCA Records. However he left the label after releasing an almost unheard single, "Feed the World". Another line by KRS directly attacking Shan was:

So why don't you wise up, show all the people in the place that you are wack,
Instead of trying take out LL, you need to take your homeboys off the crack

This referred to the fact that MC Shan had attacked LL Cool J on the B side of "The Bridge" with a song called "Beat Biter", whereby Shan claimed that LL Cool J had stolen beats for his "Rock The Bells" from "Marley Marl Scratch" theme. LL Cool J never directly responded to this claim, and the impending battle between Shan and BDP drew the attention away from it. Marley Marl later produced most of LL's album Mama Said Knock You Out.

Slate recounts: "In 1986, it was a beef that launched the start of KRS-One, with his withering attacks on MC Shan."

Another unnoticed attack is the fact that South Bronx was arranged under the same tempo as "The Bridge", most notably as the rhymes that are performed before the chorus chant.

The official story at the time was that KRS-One was defending the reputation of the South Bronx in response to MC Shan and Marley Marl claiming that hip-hop started out in Queensbridge. However, KRS-One has gone on record in an interview with MTV, saying that his real motivation was that he and Scott La Rock earlier had approached WBLS radio station's Mr. Magic with "Success Is the Word", a 12" single they had recorded under the group name 12:41. Magic disparaged it. After forming BDP, they retaliated by dissing Mr. Magic and Marley Marl's popular Juice Crew, using the whole "Queens versus Bronx" issue as a pretense.

DJ Red Alert gives a similar version of this story on the CD Beats, Rhymes and Battles Part I. In dialog on that CD (track 5), he states that Magic dissed a track by them. When those who became BDP heard "The Bridge", they decided to diss back, and this is why "South Bronx" was released.

KRS-One's brother, Kenny Parker, wrote in his autobiography that the beef had its roots in when KRS and DJ Scott La Rock had turned up uninvited at Mr. Magic's show on WBLS to ask about joining his Juice Crew. Mr. Magic responded that they were not on the same level as MC Shan and Marley Marl, cursed them and told them to leave. This led KRS and Scott to plot revenge and they chose to diss MC Shan as Mr. Magic's preferred MC.

== 1987–1990: Escalation and ending ==
The Juice Crew soon responded with the track "Kill That Noise" on Shan's album Down by Law which took various shots at KRS-One and mocked his taking offense in the first place. He even denies saying hip-hop started in Queens, and suggests BDP is just trying to jump on their bandwagon.

In a more recent interview on THE FOUNDATION (Jayquan), Shan defended and explained the misunderstood line:

JQ : Did you ever say in any song, interview or anywhere that hip-hop started in Queens?

Shan : I only said HOW it started in QUEENSBRIDGE, not (all) over the world. The new Source magazine says I still stand on the fact that hip-hop started in Queens - writers get it twisted. The song the Bridge starts off saying M.C. Shan & Marley Marl in the house tonight - they wanna tell you a story about where THEY come from.

But KRS continued to play upon the "response to the claim that hip-hop started in Queens" premise with his next response, "The Bridge Is Over", featuring lyrics recorded, with a reggae flavor, in a Jamaican accent. The track had been one of the first blendings of rap with reggae, and one section delivered in a sing song fashion modeled after Billy Joel's "It's Still Rock and Roll to Me" from his album Glass Houses.

Most of KRS's fire was directed specifically at Marley Marl and MC Shan, although the MC added insults to other Juice Crew members such as Mr. Magic and Roxanne Shante, who had earlier been at the center of the Roxanne Wars, which were a predecessor to this battle. Shante, mentioned in a very vulgar reference in "the Bridge Is Over", released a rap titled "Have A Nice Day", ghostwritten by Juice Crew colleague Big Daddy Kane (who was not otherwise personally involved in the battle), in which she took a shot at Boogie Down Productions.

Shan continues recounting in the FOUNDATION interview:

Mr. Magic dissed BDP and said some stuff about their record on the radio, and he [KRS] made me the target. I wasn't gonna keep ridin' that Kris/Shan thing...people kept saying "why aren't you answering back"? I'm like why?...I gave him a career already.

After "Kill That Noise", Shan himself became more passive in the battle, as the above statement indicated. But meanwhile, Two other Queensbridge residents, Rockwell Noel & Poet, joined in the battle, resulting from the inferior responses from MC Shan and the Juice Crew offering the strongest attack against BDP. Their first single was entitled "Beat You Down", in which he reiterates that no one actually said that hip-hop started in the Bridge, but then points out that the area was nevertheless very prominent in the early days of rap, and even had superior sound equipment, causing it to surpass the Bronx as the leader of hip-hop.

In 1987, attempting to calm down an unrelated domestic dispute involving BDP colleague D-Nice, BDP's DJ Scott La Rock was shot dead. Even after La Rock's death, the feud still continued.

Other rappers joined in making songs dissing Queensbridge, such as Cool C's "Juice Crew Dis" which mocked Shan's "Juice Crew Law" and attacks both Shan and Shanté, and M.C. Mitchski's "Brooklyn Blew Up the Bridge", with the refrain "South Bronx Helped us out" in support of Boogie Down Productions and lyrics that made fun of Shan's on-stage appearances.

Another rapper named Butchy-B (from Manhattan) stepped in for Queensbridge, with "Beatin Down KRS", in which he among other things, mocks the "didadidadiday" chant of "The Bridge is Over". Butchy-B was connected with WBLS's Mr. Magic and got involved to defend the radio station. The track "Go Magic" from the same 12-inch also touched on the rivalry.

In 1988, DJ Rockwell Noel and the Poet followed up with "Taking U Out", which was even stronger than "Beat You Down", and harshly attacked both KRS's then-wife, Ms. Melodie, and rival radio station WRKS's DJ Red Alert, who was on BDP's side of the battle. KRS responded with "Still Number 1, the Numero Uno Mix", where he calls Poet "soft" and uncreative, and accuses him of "sounding like Kane". Although conspicuously absent from this counterattack was any rebuttal to Poet's attack on his wife.

In 1990, Boogie Down Productions released the concept album Edutainment. On the second track "Blackman In Effect", he discusses the concept of "juice" and states: "I'm not down with a juice-crew".

== Legacy ==
During the 1990s, the beef was not forgotten by fans or the participants, but rather fondly remembered as a classic hip-hop rivalry. It has since been referenced in hip-hop lyrics by the likes of Cormega, Das EFX, Nas, Cunninlynguists, Big Punisher, Supernatural, Chino XL, Mars ILL, and 2Pac. MC Shan and KRS-One themselves acknowledged the rivalry's important place in hip-hop history when they appeared together in a commercial for the Sprite soft drink in the mid-nineties, in which they exchanged battle rhymes inside a boxing ring. However, the respective fortunes of the pair in the nineties were very different; MC Shan was widely seen by hip-hop listeners as the loser of the conflict; Despite co-writing and producing "Informer", a number one hit single for the Canadian reggae singer Snow, Shan never recovered his reputation and later effectively retired. KRS, meanwhile, forged out a successful solo career and remained an important figure in hip-hop.

Meanwhile, Poet had moved on, eventually rechristening himself as "Blaq Poet", and went on to be a part of the groups PHD (Poet + DJ Hot Day), and Screwball; and some of the records released over the years, took numerous pot shots at KRS.

PHD's 1991 album title track "Without Warning" samples a couple of lines from "Numero Uno" as if answering them. Screwball's "The Bio" and "You Love To Hear The Stories" (a followup to the original "The Bridge", and which featured MC Shan) recounted the story of him entering the battle, and being basically ignored, and that it thankfully never escalated into physical violence; and the latter pointed to the Nas album Illmatic (1994) as proof that "the Bridge is still live".

In 2001, on the compilation QB's Finest (a showcase of Queensbridge hip-hop artists), MC Shan took one last parting shot at KRS-One with the comment:

hip-hop was set out in the dark
The Bridge was never Over, we left our mark

KRS-One and Marley Marl have since officially retired the feud, with the release of their collaborative 2007 album, hip-hop Lives. The album features two tracks further exemplifying the end of the feud: "The Victory" (produced by DJ Premier) which sees KRS on the same track as Blaq Poet, and "Rising" (as in "Rising To the Top"), in which KRS recounts the whole story from his perspective (a struggling former group home resident trying to enter the business in a period when "answer records" were popular, sparked off by Shante's "Roxanne's Revenge"). You can see this (and the changed attitude towards the former rivals) in the line:

Answer records were big then;
after Shante did it, everyone was trying to spit them
So we spit on...
To tell you the truth, it was the only way a MC could get on
We answered MC Shan's "Queensbridge";
A dope jam about where he was from and where he lived;
But in the Bronx there was these kids
KRS, Scott La Rock tryin' to live...

He concludes the track acknowledging his indebtedness to Shan and Marley. He also speaks well of them on other tracks in the album, such as "House of Hits". KRS had also contributed a verse to the Symphony 2000 remake of the Marley Marl classic in 1999.

Queensbridge Records released the 2011 album Bridge Wars, a compilation album which features artists such as F.E.R.N (produced by DukeDaGod of The Diplomats), Mahogany Jones (four-time Champion of BET’s "Freestyle Friday's" battle competitions) and Brooklyn's own L.G. Wise.

Nas revisited "The Bridge" on his 2012 album Life Is Good by sampling it for the hook in his track "Back When", which focuses on the past of hip-hop.

=== 2016 revival with MC Shan ===
In 2016, Shan essentially revived his part of the beef in an interview, pointing out that they never actually battled, and that he was showing some resentment regarding the claim the KRS "took Shan out" and having to live with the stigma of "losing" the battle. He would claim he wanted to record a response to The Bridge Is Over, but Marley Marl stopped him. He also included a three-minute freestyle in an over the phone interview. KRS quickly responded.

== See also ==
- East Coast–West Coast hip-hop rivalry
- 50 Cent–Ja Rule feud
- Drake–Kendrick Lamar rap feud
- List of hip-hop diss tracks
