= Spyder-D =

American rapper

- Born: Duane Hughes
- Origin: New York City, New York, U.S.
- Genres: Hip hop, old-school hip hop
- Years active: 1980–present

Duane Hughes, better known by his stage name Spyder D, is an American old-school rapper and producer from New York City.

== Career ==
=== 1980s ===
"Big Apple Rappin' was released on his own Newtroit Records in 1980, placing it among hip-hop's earliest single releases. Another notable release was "I Can't Wait (To Rock The Mike)," a version of the Nu Shooz hit "I Can't Wait" released in 1986 as a single. Other Spyder D releases include "Buckwheat's Rap" (released by Profile in 1985), and "Smerphie's Dance," which has been sampled on other tracks including How We Do by The Game.

Childhood schoolmate Russell Simmons later became his manager and mentor in 1983. Spyder produced several tracks for artists such as Infinity Machine's DJ Divine, Sparky D, Roxanne Shante', as well as a string of tracks for independent labels such as Profile Records, Select Records, Spring Records, and a joint label venture with Next Plateau (launching Fly Spy Records). He also managed Power Play Studios in Queens, from various stints from 1983 to 1998. He lived in Los Angeles between 1989 and 1992, where he worked with KDAY-AM's Greg Mack and Curtis Harmon.

Spyder co-engineered and recorded his first full album, Gangsta Wages, with multi-platinum "remixologist" Greg Royal, which was released through his own Hype-Hop label. The imprint was distributed through Macola Records who, at the time also signed 2 Live Crew and Dr. Dre’s World Class Wrecking Crew. Spyder worked in the studio with Malcolm McClaren on writing lyrics for Sparky D for McClaren's Hip-Hop/Opera fusion.

=== 1990s ===
In 1996, after once again taking over the reins as Power Play Studios full time manager, Spyder began a dual role as both engineer and manager for the renowned studio. He learned to use the state of the art SSL G Series recording and mixing console from some notes given to him by chief engineer Dino. He brought back into the studio clients like DJ Run of Run-DMC, producer Larry Smith (Whodini, Run-DMC, Grandmaster Flash), Herbie Azor and Salt-n-Pepa, as well as bringing in new superstar producers like P Diddy Hit Squad producer Ron (Amen Ra) Lawrence.

In 1997, Spyder moved on to become manager and engineer for Gospel Jazz musician Mel Holder at Toy Factory, another Queens, NY based recording studio. At Toy Factory he engineered for such clients as Mic Murphy of The System, and Pharaoh Monch of Organized Konfusion, as well as on Mel Holder’s stirring saxophone rendition of R. Kelly’s "I Believe I Can Fly".

In 1999, Spyder moved to Atlanta, and began freelance engineering at Dallas Austin's DARP Studios, and Bobby Brown’s Boss Recording, bringing with him some of his New York and northeast clientele, including Jam-Master Jay protégé Derrick Stanfield-Kivoi.

=== 2000s ===
He released a full-length album in 2000 entitled True Dat.

In 2005, Spyder became the owner of an American Basketball Association franchise, the Charlotte Krunk (named after a type of hip hop music). Dr Glenn Toby, founder of The Book Bank Foundation and former rap rival from Queens, New York (known then in the rap world as "Mr Sweety G") was his business partner and investor in The Atlanta Krunk. The franchise moved to Atlanta and joined the Continental Basketball Association under new majority owner Freedom Williams, the former lead voice for multi-platinum dance-hop group C+C Music Factory, where Spyder signed Grayson Boucher, AKA " The Professor," of And 1 fame, and recruited Kenny Anderson as head coach.

== Discography ==
=== Albums ===
- Gangsta Wages (1990)
- True 'Dat (2001)

=== Singles ===
- "Big Apple Rappin' (National Rappin' Anthem)" (1980)
- "Rollerskaterrap / Spinnin' Webs & Rappin' Rhymes" (1980)
- "Smerphies Dance" (1982)
- "Placin' the Beat" (1984)
- "Rap Is Here to Stay / Buckwheat's Beat" (1985)
- "I Can't Wait (To Rock the Mike)" (1986)
- "How Ya Like Me Now / The Heart of Hollis" (1987)
- "B-Boys Don't Fall in Love" (1987)
- "Try to Bite Me Now" (1988)
- "Hooked on Your Look" (1988)
- "Gangsta Wages" (1990)
- "Yes, Yes, Y'all" (2001)

== See also ==
- Big Apple Rappin': The Early Days of Hip-Hop Culture in New York City 1979-1982
