= Scott La Rock =

American disc jockey (1962–1987)

Background information
- Born: Scott Monroe Sterling; March 2, 1962; New York City, U.S.
- Died: August 27, 1987 (aged 25) New York City, U.S.
- Genres: Hip hop
- Occupations: DJ; producer
- Years active: 1986–1987
- Label: B-Boy
- Formerly of: Boogie Down Productions

Scott Monroe Sterling (March 2, 1962 – August 27, 1987), known by the stage name DJ Scott La Rock, was an American hip-hop disc jockey and music producer from the Bronx, New York. He was a founding member of the East Coast hip hop group Boogie Down Productions. He was also known for his association with the rapper KRS-One who was a member of Boogie Down Productions.

Sterling's death in August 1987 is said to have been the first murder of a major hip hop artist.

== Early life ==
Scott Sterling was born on March 2, 1962, in the Bronx, New York City. His parents separated when he was four years old, so he was raised by his mother, Carolyn Morant, a municipal employee. They moved from Queens, New York City, to the Bronx: first Morrisania and then Morris Heights.

He attended Our Saviour Lutheran High School, graduating in 1980. He attended Castleton State College in Vermont and earned a varsity letter in basketball there.

== Career ==
La Rock returned to New York City in hopes of finding work and making inroads in the music industry. Through a connection of his mother's, La Rock landed a job as a social worker at Franklin Armory Men's Shelter on 166th Street in the Bronx. At night, though, he spun records at the hip hop hot spot the Broadway Repertoire Theatre.

During his time as a social worker, La Rock met rapper KRS-One in 1986 at Franklin Men's Shelter where KRS resided. The pair formed Boogie Down Productions (BDP) with DJ Derrick "D-Nice" Jones, a cousin of the shelter's security guard, Floyd Payne. The group's 1987 debut album, Criminal Minded, is considered a hip hop classic.

== Murder ==
On August 27, 1987, D-Nice was assaulted by men upset that he had been talking to one of their ex-girlfriends. D-Nice asked La Rock to help defuse the situation. Later that day, La Rock, Scotty "Manager Moe" Morris, DJ McBooo, D-Nice and BDP bodyguard Darrell rode a Jeep CJ-7 to the Highbridge Homes Projects building on University Avenue in the South Bronx.

As La Rock and his friends drove in the Jeep, bullets were fired through the side and top of the vehicle. Witnesses reported La Rock grasped his neck and fell forward which struck his head on the dashboard. He did not immediately realize he had been struck by a bullet in the back of his head. La Rock was driven to Lincoln Hospital. He was conscious as he was wheeled into the emergency department, telling doctors he was feeling cold and tired. After lifesaving efforts failed, he was declared brain dead, and his mother later made the decision to terminate life support and donate his organs.

Two men were arrested and charged with La Rock's murder, but they were acquitted at trial. He left behind an infant son.

== Discography ==
- Criminal Minded (1987)
- By All Means Necessary (1988) (La Rock was killed during the making of this album)
- Man & His Music (Remixes from Around the World) (1997)
- Best of B-Boy Records (2001)

== See also ==
- List of murdered hip hop musicians
