= KRS-One discography =

American rapper discography

This is the discography of American rapper KRS-One.

== Albums ==
=== Studio albums ===
List of studio albums, with selected chart positions, sales figures and certifications
Title	Album details	Peak chart positions									Certifications
Title	Album details	US	US R&B /HH	US Ind.	CAN	GER	NLD	UK	UK R&B	UK Ind.	Certifications
Return of the Boom Bap	Released: September 28, 1993; Label: Jive; Formats: CD, LP, cassette, digital download, streaming	35	3	—	—	—	—	—	—	—	
KRS-One	Released: October 10, 1995; Label: Jive; Formats: CD, LP, cassette, digital download, streaming	19	2	—	23	—	—	95	13	—	
I Got Next	Released: May 20, 1997; Label: Jive; Formats: CD, LP, cassette, digital download, streaming	3	2	—	18	95	90	58	11	—	RIAA: Gold; MC: Gold
The Sneak Attack	Released: March 27, 2001; Label: Koch; Formats: CD, LP, cassette, digital download, streaming	43	9	1	—	—	—	—	—	38	
Kristyles	Released: April 22, 2003; Label: Koch; Formats: CD, digital download, streaming	186	30	10	—	—	—	—	—	—	
Keep Right	Released: July 13, 2004; Label: Grit; Formats: CD, LP, digital download, streaming	—	80	—	—	—	—	—	—	—	
Life	Released: June 13, 2006; Label: Image; Formats: CD	—	50	—	—	—	—	—	—	—	
Adventures in Emceein	Released: February 5, 2008; Label: Echo-Vista; Formats: CD, streaming	—	—	—	—	—	—	—	—	—	
Maximum Strength	Released: June 10, 2008; Label: Koch; Formats: CD, digital download, streaming	—	78	—	—	—	—	—	—	—	
The BDP Album	Released: January 10, 2012; Label: 682; Formats: CD, LP, digital download	—	—	—	—	—	—	—	—	—	
Never Forget	Released: 2013; Label: Front Page; Formats: CD	—	—	—	—	—	—	—	—	—	
Now Hear This	Released: November 23, 2015; Label: R.A.M.P./Vinyl Digital; Formats: CD, LP	—	—	—	—	—	—	—	—	—	
The World Is MIND	Released: May 9, 2017; Label: R.A.M.P.; Formats: CD, LP	—	—	—	—	—	—	—	—	—	
Street Light (First Edition)	Released: November 8, 2019; Label: R.A.M.P.; Formats: CD, digital download, streaming	—	—	—	—	—	—	—	—	—	
Between Da Protests	Released: December 21, 2020; Label: R.A.M.P.; Formats: CD, digital download, streaming	—	—	—	—	—	—	—	—	—	
I M A M C R U 1 2	Released: February 22, 2022; Label: R.A.M.P.; Formats: digital download, streaming	—	—	—	—	—	—	—	—	—	
Temple of Hip Hop: Global Awareness	Released: March 9, 2025; Label: R.A.M.P.; Formats: digital download, streaming	—	—	—	—	—	—	—	—	—	
"—" denotes a recording that did not chart or was not released in that territory.

=== Compilation albums ===
List of compilation albums, with selected chart positions
Title	Album details	Peak chart positions			
Title	Album details	US	US R&B /HH	UK R&B	UK Ind.
Strictly for da Breakdancers	Released: 1995; Label: Front Page; Formats: LP	—	—	—	—
The Goddess Set/Strictly for da Emceez...	Released: 1995; Label: Front Page; Formats: LP	—	—	—	—
Strictly for da Breakdancers & Emceez Volume 1	Released: 1996; Label: Front Page; Formats: CD	—	—	—	—
Strictly for da Breakdancers & Emceez Volume 2	Released: 1996; Label: Front Page; Formats: LP	—	—	—	—
Battle for Rap Supremacy	Released: November 19, 1996; Label: Cold Chillin'; Formats: CD, LP, Cassette	—	—	—	—
Aka Kris Parker	Released: 1997; Label: self-released; Formats: LP	—	—	—	—
A Retrospective	Released: August 22, 2000; Label: Jive/RCA; Formats: CD, LP, cassette, digital download, streaming	200	62	25	41
Strickly for da Breakdancers & Emceez	Released: August 21, 2001; Label: Cleopatra/X-Ray; Formats: CD, digital download, streaming	—	—	—	—
Fundamentals of Hip Hop Volume 1	Released: 2002; Label: self-released; Formats: CD	—	—	—	—
Best of Rapture's Delight	Released: September 22, 2003; Label: BMG Special Products; Formats: CD	—	—	—	—
D.I.G.I.T.A.L.	Released: November 25, 2003; Label: Front Page/X-Ray; Formats: CD, digital download, streaming	—	—	—	—
Playlist: The Very Best of KRS-One	Released: January 26, 2010; Label: Sony Music/Jive; Formats: CD, digital download, streaming	—	—	—	—
The Essential KRS-One and Boogie Down Productions	Released: March 14, 2014; Label: Jive/Legacy; Formats: digital download, streaming	—	—	—	—
"—" denotes a recording that did not chart or was not released in that territory.

=== Mixtapes ===
List of mixtapes, with selected chart positions
Title	Album details	Peak chart positions	
Title	Album details	US R&B /HH	US Ind.
The Mix Tape	Released: August 27, 2002; Label: Koch; Formats: CD	32	17
Footsoldiers Mix (with Footsoldiers)	Released: April 1, 2006; Label: Self-released; Formats: digital download	—	—
King of the Ol' Skool	Released: 2008; Label: Echo-Vista; Formats: digital download, streaming	—	—
The KRS-One Mixtape (with DJ Opale)	Released: February 26, 2010; Label: Self-released; Formats: digital download	—	—
The Apprenticeship (with Beast 1333)	Released: May 16, 2017; Label: Self-released; Formats: digital download	—	—
"—" denotes a recording that did not chart or was not released in that territory.

=== Collaborative albums ===
List of collaborative albums, with selected chart positions
Title	Album details	Peak chart positions				
Title	Album details	US	US R&B /HH	US Ind.	US Rap	US Gos.
Spiritual Minded (with The Temple of Hip hop)	Released: January 22, 2002; Label: Koch; Formats: CD, cassette, digital download	—	64	10	—	4
Hip Hop Lives (with Marley Marl)	Released: May 22, 2007; Label: Koch; Formats: CD, digital download, streaming	140	23	15	8	—
Survival Skills (with Buckshot)	Released: September 15, 2009; Label: Duck Down; Formats: CD, LP, digital download, streaming	62	19	9	11	—
Meta-Historical (with True Master)	Released: August 31, 2010; Label: Fat Beats; Formats: CD, streaming	—	57	—	24	—
Godsville (with Showbiz)	Released: February 15, 2011; Label: D.I.T.C.; Formats: CD, digital download, streaming	—	—	—	—	—
Royalty Check (with Bumpy Knuckles)	Released: May 31, 2011; Label: 6.8.2; Formats: CD, LP, digital download, streaming	—	—	—	—	—
"—" denotes a recording that did not chart or was not released in that territory.

=== Promotional albums ===
List of promotional albums
Title	Album details
55 Minutes Of KRS One - The Ultimate Street Mix Tape (with Funkmaster Flex & J Grand; Mixtape; compilation album)	Released: 2001; Label: Koch; Formats: CD
Unreleased, Freestyles and Remixes (compilation album)	Released: 2008; Label: Self-released; Formats: CD

== EPs ==
List of extended plays
Title	Details
Break the Chain (Psychosonic Comic!) (Note: released as Big Joe Krash)	Released: 1994; Label: Marvel Music; Formats: cassette
My People	Released: 2002; Label: Temple of HipHop; Formats: digital download, streaming
What You Know About? (with Q. Burse)	Released: 2005; Label: Styluswars/Fancbass; Formats: LP, digital download, streaming
We Will Rock You	Released: April 1, 2007; Label: X-Ray; Formats: digital download, streaming
Hip Hop Lives - Pre Release EP (with Marley Marl)	Released: May 8, 2007; Label: Koch; Formats: digital download, streaming
Radio (with Eneeone)	Released: November 25, 2008; Label: Deranged Music; Formats: digital download, streaming
The Just-Ice and Krs-One EP, Vol. 1 (with Just-Ice)	Released: May 3, 2010; Label: WHOMAG; Formats: CD, digital download, streaming
Back to the L.A.B. (Lyrical Ass Beating)	Released: May 12, 2010; Label: Digital; Formats: CD, digital download, streaming
Memories - Remix EP (with Just-Ice)	Released: November 6, 2012; Label: Peasant Podium; Formats: CD, digital download, streaming
Never Forget	Released: 2013.; Label: Front Page; Formats: digital download, streaming
Green Related [Hip Hop & Dub Mix] (featuring G. Simone)	Released: June 20, 2014; Label: Lionpaw & Th3; Formats: digital download, streaming
The Block Party (Mixtape EP; with Kid Capri)	Released: May 4, 2020; Label: self-released; Formats: digital download

== Singles ==
=== As lead artist ===
List of singles and selected chart positions, showing year released and album name
Title	Year	Peak chart positions							Certifications	Album
Title	Year	US	US R&B	US Rap	NZ	UK	UK Dance	UK R&B	Certifications	Album
"Outta Here"	1993	— (Note: "Outta Here" did not enter the Billboard Hot 100, but peaked at number 6 on the Bubbling Under Hot 100.)	61	5	—	—	—	—		Return of the Boom Bap
"Sound of da Police"	1993	89	79	17	—	—	—	—	BPI: Silver	Return of the Boom Bap
"Return of the Boom Bap"	1994	—	—	—	—	—	—	—		Return of the Boom Bap
"MC's Act Like They Don't Know"	1995	57	35	9	—	84	12	—		KRS-One
"Rappaz R. N. Dainja"	1995	—	—	—	—	47	20	—		KRS-One
"Big Timer" / "Pick It Up" (featuring Mad Lion)	1995	—	—	—	—	—	—	—		Non-album single
"Word Perfect" / "The MC" / "Can't Stop, Won't Stop"	1996	— (Note: "The MC" did not enter the Billboard Hot 100, but peaked at number 18 on the Bubbling Under Hot 100.)	67	17	—	70	12	13		I Got Next
"Step into a World (Rapture's Delight)"	1997	70	22	8	10	24	4	6		I Got Next
"Heartbeat" / "A Friend" (featuring Redman and Angie Martinez)	1997	— (Note: "A Friend" did not enter the Billboard Hot 100, but peaked at number 14 on the Bubbling Under Hot 100.)	70	31	49	66	19	—		I Got Next
"Men of Steel" (with Shaquille O'Neal, Ice Cube, B-Real and Peter Gunz)	1997	82	53	10	—	—	—	—		Steel Soundtrack
"5 Boroughs" (with Bounty Killer, Buckshot, Cam'ron, Keith Murray, Killah Priest, Prodigy, Redman, Run and Vigilante)	1998	—	79	10	—	—	—	—		The Corruptor Soundtrack
"Bulworth (They Talk About It While We Live It)" (with Method Man, Kam and Prodigy)	1998	—	—	—	—	—	—	—		Bulworth Soundtrack
"Gunplay" (featuring Apocalypse and Mo Money)	1998	—	—	—	—	—	—	—		Non-album single
"Shutupayouface" (Note: "Shutupayouface" was released as a split single with "Yes, Yes Y'all" by Schoolly D.)	2000	—	—	—	—	—	—	—		Once in the Life Soundtrack / The Sneak Attack
"Hot"	2000	—	—	40	—	—	—	—		The Sneak Attack
"The Mind"	2001	—	—	—	—	—	—	—		The Sneak Attack
"Get Your Self Up"	2001	—	— (Note: "Get Your Self Up" did not enter the Hot R&B/Hip-Hop Songs, but peaked at number 53 on the Hot R&B/Hip-Hop Singles Sales.)	—	—	—	—	—		The Sneak Attack
"South Bronx 2002" (with The Temple of Hip hop)	2002	—	—	—	—	—	—	—		Spiritual Minded
"Clear 'Em Out" (featuring Tonedeff) (Note: "Clear 'Em Out" was released as a split single with "Rumble" by The High & Mighty.)	2002	—	—	—	—	—	—	—		The Difference Vol. 1
"The Message 2002"	2002	—	—	—	—	—	—	—		The Mix Tape
"That's It" (with Mad Lion)	2003	—	—	—	—	—	—	—		Beef Soundtrack / Kristyles
"Underground"	2003	—	—	—	—	—	—	—		Kristyles
"How Bad Do You Want It" (featuring Peedo)	2003	—	—	—	—	—	—	—		KRS-One Presents Peedo & The Luna Empire / Kristyles
"Let 'Em Have It"	2003	—	— (Note: "Let 'Em Have It" did not enter the Hot R&B/Hip-Hop Songs, but peaked at number 55 on the ot R&B/Hip-Hop Singles Sales.)	—	—	—	—	—		Keep Right
"Illegal Business Remix 2004"	2004	—	—	—	—	—	—	—		Keep Right
"Sound of da Police" (re-release)	2004	—	—	—	—	—	—	36		Best of Rapture's Delight
"Boogie Down Ox" (with Oh No and Ricci Rucker)	2005	—	—	—	—	—	—	—		Non-album single
"Gangsta House" (as The 1200 Warriors presents G-Dubs and KRS-One)	2005	—	—	—	—	—	—	—		In the House Part 1
"My Life"	2006	—	—	—	—	—	—	—		Life
"Classic (Better Than I've Ever Been)" (with Kanye West, Nas, and Rakim)	2007	—	—	—	—	—	—	—		Non-album single
"Money/Amsterdam /My Soldier Boy" (featuring MC Lyte)	2007	—	—	—	—	—	—	—		Adventures in Emceein
"Rent" (with Black Skeptik)	2009	—	—	—	—	—	—	—		Non-album single
"Robot" (with Buckshot) (Note: "Robot" was released as a split single with "The DJ" by DJ Revolution featuring KRS-One.)	2009	—	—	—	—	—	—	—		Survival Skills
"Oh Really (Remix)" (with Buckshot; featuring Talib Kweli & Geologic)	2009	—	—	—	—	—	—	—		Survival Skills
"Times Up" (featuring Jesse West)	2010	—	—	—	—	—	—	—		The BDP Album
"The Truth" (featuring Showbiz)	2011	—	—	—	—	—	—	—		Godsville
"There It Is" (with Just-Ice)	2012	—	—	—	—	—	—	—		The Just-Ice and KRS-One EP, Vol. 1
"Rear View" (with Substance Abuse)	2013	—	—	—	—	—	—	—		Background Music
"Big Up New York"	2014	—	—	—	—	—	—	—		Non-album singles
"Kulture vs. Korporate" (with Maylay Sage, Self Lion, Def Mass and Science)	2017	—	—	—	—	—	—	—		Non-album singles
"Hip Hop Nation" (featuring Frank Fitzpatrick, K’naan and Lina)	2019	—	—	—	—	—	—	—		You Got Served: Beat the World Soundtrack
"Krazy"	2021	—	—	—	—	—	—	—		I M A M C R U 1 2
"Knock Em Out"	2021	—	—	—	—	—	—	—		I M A M C R U 1 2
"The Beginning"	2021	—	—	—	—	—	—	—		I M A M C R U 1 2
"Respect" (with Grand Official)	2022	—	—	—	—	—	—	—		Supreme
"The Real" (with Tekneek On The Beat)	2023	—	—	—	—	—	—	—		Non-album single
"50 More Years of Hip Hop"	2024	—	—	—	—	—	—	—		Temple of Hip Hop: Global Awareness
"THE KINGS" (with Diamond D)	2024	—	—	—	—	—	—	—		The Diam Piece 3: Initium
"Looka Here" (with Redman)	2025	—	—	—	—	—	—	—		Muddy Waters Too
"Free Mumia" (featuring Channel Live)	2025	—	—	—	—	—	—	—		KRS-One
"—" denotes a recording that did not chart or was not released in that territory.

=== As featured artist ===
List of singles and selected chart positions, showing year released and album name
Title	Year	Peak chart positions										Certifications	Album
Title	Year	US	US R&B	US Rap	GER	IRL	NED	NZ	SWE	SWI	UK	Certifications	Album
"Serious" (Steady B featuring KRS-One)	1988	—	—	—	—	—	—	—	—	—	92		Let the Hustlers Play (Note: In the liner notes for Let the Hustlers Play, KRS-One was credited as production collaborator on the track version of "Serious," but not as guest artist.)
"Self Destruction" (as part of Stop the Violence Movement)	1989	—	30	1	—	—	—	33	—	—	75	RIAA: Gold	Non-album single
"Radio Song" (R.E.M. featuring KRS-One)	1991	—	—	—	—	5	56	—	—	—	28		Out of Time
"Heal Yourself" (as part of H.E.A.L. Human Education Against Lies)	1991	—	—	—	—	—	—	—	—	—	—		Civilization vs. Technology
"Rise N Shine" (Kool Moe Dee featuring KRS-One and Chuck D)	1991	—	—	1	—	—	—	—	—	—	—		Funke, Funke Wisdom
"The Jam" (Shabba Ranks featuring KRS-One)	1991	—	52	1	—	—	—	—	—	—	—		As Raw as Ever
"I Get Wrecked" (Tim Dog featuring KRS-One)	1993	—	—	8	—	—	—	—	—	—	—		Do or Die
"Rough..." (Queen Latifah featuring Treach, Heavy D and KRS-One)	1994	—	—	—	—	—	—	—	—	—	—		Black Reign
"Mad Izm (Channel Live featuring KRS-One)	1995	54	27	3	—	—	—	—	—	—	—		Station Identification
"1, 2 Pass It" (as part of D&D All-Stars)	1995	— (Note: "1, 2 Pass It" did not enter the Billboard Hot 100, but peaked at number 8 on the Bubbling Under Hot 100.)	66	11	—	—	—	—	—	—	—		The D&D Project, Vol. 1
"Double Trouble (Remix)" (Mad Lion featuring KRS-One and Brenda K. Starr)	1996	—	69	23	—	—	—	—	—	—	—		Non-album single (Note: The original version of "Double Trouble" was included on Mad Lion's debut album Real Ting.)
"East Coast/West Coast Killas" (as part of Group Therapy)	1996	—	—	—	—	—	—	—	—	—	—		Dr. Dre Presents: The Aftermath
"Do Ya Thang" (C-Swing featuring KRS-One)	1996	—	—	—	—	—	—	—	—	—	—		D'illusions of Grandeur (Note: "Do Ya Thang" was included in the album under the title "My Thing!!".)
"Digital" (Goldie featuring KRS-One)	1997	—	—	—	—	—	—	43	35	—	13		Saturnz Return
"The Anthem" (Sway & King Tech featuring Eminem, RZA, Tech N9ne, Xzibit, Pharoahe Monch, Kool G Rap, KRS-One, Jayo Felony and Chino XL)	1999	—	—	—	—	—	—	—	—	—	—		This or That
"Symphony 2000" (Truck featuring Kool G Rap, KRS-One and Big Pun)	1999	—	—	—	—	—	—	—	—	—	—		Non-album single (Note: "Symphony 2000" was later included on KRS-One's compilation album D.I.G.I.T.A.L. under the title "As You Already Know.")
"Return of Hip Hop (Ooh, Ooh)" (DJ Tomekk featuring KRS-One, Torch and MC Rene)	2001	—	—	—	13	—	—	—	—	22	13		Return of Hip Hop
"Balumbalang" (Mexicano 777 featuring KRS-One)	2001	—	—	—	—	—	—	—	—	—	—		God's Assassins
"Dear Mr. President" (as part of The S.T.O.P. Movement)	2004	—	—	—	—	—	—	—	—	—	—		Greatest Hits Episode 1
"Bin Laden Remix (Bin Laden Pt. 2)" (Immortal Technique featuring KRS-One and Chuck D)	2005	—	—	—	—	—	—	—	—	—	—		Non-album singles
"Trash Talk" (Kenny Parker featuring KRS-One and G)	2006	—	—	—	—	—	—	—	—	—	—		Non-album singles
"Throwin Up Letters" (Longevity featuring KRS-One)	2007	—	—	—	—	—	—	—	—	—	—		Infamy Soundtrack
"Self Construction" (as part of Stop the Violence Movement)	2008	—	—	—	—	—	—	—	—	—	—		Non-album single
"Love" (Almost September featuring KRS-One & Sleepy Brown)	2008	—	—	—	—	—	—	—	—	—	—		Almost September
"Come Back Home (Volta Masters Remix)" (Copperpot featuring KRS-One)	2008	—	—	—	—	—	—	—	—	—	—		Come Back Home
"The World Is Crumbling" (Nicole Holness featuring KRS-One & Mateo Jordache)	2009	—	—	—	—	—	—	—	—	—	—		Nicole Holness a.k.a. X-Quisite: Unreleased
"Show Power" (Showbiz featuring KRS-One)	2010	—	—	—	—	—	—	—	—	—	—		Godsville
"Legendary" (Showbiz featuring KRS-One)	2011	—	—	—	—	—	—	—	—	—	—		Godsville

== Appearances ==
KRS One has appeared on several songs with other artists, and due to this he has received 9 Gold and 7 Platinum plaques.

- 1986
  - "Advance" by Scott La Rock and The Celebrity Three
- 1987
  - "Going Way Back" + "Moshitup" by Just-Ice///\\\Kool & Deadly (Justicizms)
- 1988
  - "Serious {Ceereeus BDP Remix)" : Steady B///\\\12"
- 1989
  - "Clobberin' Time/Pay the Price" : Sick of It All///\\\Blood, Sweat and No Tears
  - "Party Together" : Sly & Robbie///\\\Silent Assassin
  - "Tribe Vibes" : Jungle Brothers///\\\Done by the Forces of Nature
  - "Evil That Men Do" : Queen Latifah///\\\All Hail the Queen
- 1990
  - "The TR 808 Is Coming" : D-Nice///\\\Call Me D-Nice
- 1991
  - "Rhymin' Skills" : D-Nice///\\\To tha Rescue
  - "Good Kill" : Too Much Joy///\\\Cereal Killers
- 1993
  - "Black Cop" : KRS-1///\\\CB4 (soundtrack) [& Return of the Boom Bap]
  - "I Get Wrecked" : Tim Dog///\\\Do or Die
  - "Rough..." : Queen Latifah///\\\Black Reign
- 1994
  - "Big Joe Krash & So Much Greater" from the Break The Chain maxi / KRS-One aka Big Joe Krash
  - "Friends and Respect" : Heavy D and the Boyz///\\\Nuttin' but Love
  - Stop the Breaks : Ron G with Raekwon, Killa Sin, O.C. & Notorious B.I.G.///\\\ 12"
- 1995
  - "KRS-One Speech" : Funkmaster Flex///\\\The Mix Tape, Vol. 1
  - "Represent the Real" : Das EFX///\\\Hold It Down [& KRS-One]
  - "Bronx Tale" : Fat Joe///\\\Jealous One's Envy
  - "Ah Yeah" : KRS-1///\\\Pump Ya Fist (Music Inspired by the Black Panthers) [& KRS-One]
- 1996
  - "Brainstorm" + No Gimmicks : Lord Finesse///\\\The Awakening
  - "High School Rock" : KRS-1///\\\High School High (soundtrack)
  - "Conscious Style" : Poor Righteous Teachers///\\\The New World Order
  - "Crazy" + Milk (People Call Me) : Young Zee///\\\Musical Meltdown
- 1997
  - "Bring It Back" : KRS-1///\\\Rhyme & Reason (soundtrack)
  - "Team Players" : DJ Honda with KRS-One & King Doe-V ///\\\HII
  - "Perhaps She'll Die" : KRS-1//\\\Dangerous Ground (soundtrack)
  - "Scatter" + "Article (Lyrical Shot pt. 2)": Whitey Don///\\\Whitey Don
  - "Move Ahead" : Soul Assassins (KRS-)///\\\Chapter 1
  - "The French Connection" : KRS-1///\\\Ma 6-T va crack-er (soundtrack)
  - "PBS" : Positive Black Soul///\\\New York / Paris / Dakar
  - "Digital" : Goldie///\\\Saturnz Return
  - "Reputation" : Chubb Rock///\\\The Mind
  - "Plan Up Your Family" : KRS-1///\\\Booty Call (soundtrack)
- 1998
  - "Check It Out" : KRS-1///\\\Orgazmo (soundtrack) +produced by the Dust Bros.
  - "Ey Yo (The Reggae Virus)" : KRS-One, Shaggy & Mad Lion///\\\Caught Up (soundtrack)
  - "Bulworth (They Talk About It While We Live It)" : Prodigy, Method Man, KRS-One & Kam///\\\Bulworth (soundtrack)
  - "Blade" : KRS-One with Channel Live///\\\Blade: soundtrack
  - "Let It Flow (Do You Like Scratchin'?) : Malcolm McLaren with KRS-One///\\\Buffalo Gals Back to Skool
  - "Ocean Within" : KRS-One & Saul Williams///\\\Slam (soundtrack)
  - "Freestyle" : Funkmaster Flex///\\\The Mix Tape, Vol. III
  - "Unstoppable" : Public Enemy///\\\He Got Game (soundtrack)
  - "Drop It Heavy" : Show & AG///\\\Full Scale [& D.I.T.C.]
  - "Destiny" : Shai///\\\Destiny
  - "Do or Die" : Kid Capri///\\\Soundtrack to the Streets
- 1999
  - "B-Boy 2000" : Crazy Town///\\\The Gift of Game
  - "Live & Direct" : Sugar Ray///\\\14:59
  - "Line of Fire" : Domingo, MC Shan, Godsons, F.T., Bamboo, Feel-X, Sinz of Reality & Ras Kass///\\\Behind the Doors of the 13th Floor
  - "Where You At" : Rascalz///\\\Global Warning
  - "Live on the Mic" : Kurupt///\\\Tha Streetz Iz a Mutha
  - "Symphony 2000" : Truck Turner with Big Pun & Kool G Rap///\\\12"
- 2000
  - "Class of 87" : Tony Touch with KRS-One, Big Daddy Kane & Kool G Rap///\\\The Piece Maker
  - "Kenny Parker Show 2001" : Xzibit///\\\Restless
  - "Up from da Underground" : Xzibit with Ras Kass & Mad Lion///\\\Likwit Rhymes
- 2001
  - "Return of Hip Hop (Ooh, Ooh) : DJ Tomekk///\\\The Return of Hip Hop
  - "Balumbalang!" : Mexicano 777///\\\God's Assassins
- 2002
  - "GospelAlphaMegaFunkyBoogieDiscoMusic" : T-Bone///\\\
- 2003
  - "Take It" : will.i.am///\\\Must B 21
  - "If U Only Knew" : CunninLynguists///\\\Sloppy Seconds Vol.1
  - "Let's Go (It's a Movement)" : Warren G & KRS-One///\\\Beef (soundtrack)
  - "U Must Learn" : Snoop Dogg///\\\Welcome to tha Chuuch Mixtape Vol. 2
  - "Bin Laden (Remix)" : Immortal Technique & Chuck D///\\\12"
  - "Pack Up (Remix)" : Lyrics Born, Evidence, Jumbo the Garbageman (of Lifesavas)///\\\12"
- 2004
  - "Let's Go" : Da Beatminerz///\\\Fully Loaded w/ Statik
  - "Gangsta House" : Jazzy Jeff///\\\In the House
  - "Dear Mr. President" : The S.T.O.P Movement
- 2005
  - "My Thing!!" : Emmanuel///\\\D'Illusions of Grandeur
  - "Our Philosophy" : Mr. R, Rockin' Squat///\\\
- 2006
  - "Trash Talk" : Kenny Parker///\\\Mess Hall Recordings)
  - "Ground Level" + "Do I Scare You?" : Footsoldiers///\\\
- 2007
  - "Speak the Truth" : X-Clan///\\\Return from Mecca
  - "Sex, Drugs & Violence" : Public Enemy///\\\How You Sell Soul to a Soulless People Who Sold Their Soul???
  - "The Perfect Beat" : Talib Kweli///\\\Eardrum
  - "Exodus" : Noisia & Mayhem///\\\Exodus
  - "Did What We Had to Do" : Statik Selektah, Large Professor & L Da Headtoucha///\\\
  - "Wholetrain" : with El Da Sensei///\\\Wholetrain OST
  - "Love" : Almost September & Sleepy Brown///\\\The Almost September EP
  - "Throwin Up Letters (Dirty Version)" : Longevity & Rakaa Iriscience///\\\
- 2008
  - "5 Boroughs" by LL Cool J Feat. Method Man, KRS-One, Jim Jones & Lil' Kim on Exit 13
  - "The DJ" by DJ Revolution on King Of The Decks
  - "My Conscience" by Fat Joe on The Elephant in the Room
  - "Arrival (Bassnectar remix)" by Heavyweight Dub Champion
  - "Control" by Cymarshall Law & KRS-One on Global Connection Vol. 1
  - "Come Back Home" by KRS-One on "WYLA?"
  - "How It's Supposed to Be" by Ed O.G. & Da Bulldogs from the album Life of a Kid in the Ghetto – Demos and Rarities (recorded in 1990/91)
  - "Rock Dis" by Marley Marl & Craig G on the album Operation: Take Back Hip-Hop
  - "16 17 18" by Almost September feat. KRS-One, Al Be Back
  - "Come Back Home", by Copperpot
  - "Run It" by EPMD on the album We Mean Business
- 2009
  - "New York" by Peedo feat. KRS-One, Fat Joe
  - "We Speak Hip Hop" by Grandmaster Flash feat. KRS-One, Afasi, Kase. O, Maccho, Abass from The Bridge (Concept of a Culture)
  - "What If" by Grandmaster Flash from The Bridge (Concept of a Culture)
  - "Get It Done" by Joe Flizzow feat. KRS-One from the album President
  - "We Are Hip Hop" by The Temple of Hip Hop feat. Fat Joe, KRS-One, Rampage, Rha Goddess, Smooth
  - "Mega Fresh X" by Cormega from the album Born and Raised
  - "Pass the Mic" by Masta Ace & Ed O.G. from the album Arts & Entertainment
  - "The Movement" by Jay-Roc N' Jakebeatz from the album Power to the B-Boyz
  - "Grand Concourse Benches" by Alchemist from the album Chemical Warfare
  - "You Gotta Stay Hungry" by 67 Mob from the album T.I.M.E.
  - "We Need You" by Beast 1333 feat. KRS-One, Kiyana & Realest Reeken from the album Mark of the Beast
  - "Jam On It", "Change" and "All City Kings" all by Beast 1333 feat. KRS-One from the album Mark of the Beast
  - "Hip Hop" by N.A.S.A. from The Spirit of Apollo
  - "Arrival" by Heavyweight Dub Champion feat. A.P.O.S.T.L.E., KRS-One & Stero-Lion from Rise of the Champion Nation
  - "Rise" by Heavyweight Dub Champion feat. A.P.O.S.T.L.E., J Criminology, KRS-One, Lady K & Stero-Lion from Rise of the Champion Nation
  - "King of the Mountain" by Heavyweight Dub Champion feat. A.P.O.S.T.L.E., David Icke & KRS-One from Rise of the Champion Nation
  - "The World Is Crumbling" by Nicole Holness feat. KRS-One & Mateo Jordache
- 2010
  - "A Dream" by Wyze Mindz feat. J.F.K., KRS-One, Les Brown & Rocky from the album World Meltdown
  - "The Truth Is... (KRS-One Testimony)" by Truth Now from Karma Alarm
  - "5%" : DJ Premier with KRS-One & Grand Puba///\\\DJ Premier Presents Get Used To Us
- 2011
  - "History" by Game feat. KRS-One, Big Daddy Kane, Doug E Fresh from the mixtape Purp & Patron
  - "What is Hip Hop?" by MC Lars feat. KRS-One, Rittz, mc chris from the mixtape Indie Rocket Science
  - "The Gospel of Hip-Hop" by MC Lars feat. KRS-One from the album Lars Attacks!
  - "Clobberin' Time" by Sick of it All from the album Nonstop (Note: This is a new recording from the one 22 years ago)
  - "À la vie, à la mort" Taktika Feat. Krs One & Buckshot from the album À bout portant confirmed by boutique
  - "Key of Life" by Rockin' Squat from US Alien Chapter One
- 2013
  - "Future" by Brothers of the Stone from the album Brothers of the Stone
  - "Dvign se" by Trkaj from Vse je OK
  - "99 Interludes" by Insight on D/A Orthophonic Sounds
- 2014
  - "No Requests" by Datsik from Down 4 My Ninjas
  - "What It Is" by Jonathan Emile of The Morph-tet from the album Exclamations
- 2015
  - "Jihad Love Squad" by N.A.S.A.
  - "Free Flow (Club Dub)" by Robosonic
  - "BLK THSS" and "Crowdrockers" from the PE 2.0 album InsPirEd
  - "Superpowers" : Mr. Green///\\\Live From The Streets
- 2016
  - "Buckshot" : Macklemore & Ryan Lewis with DJ Premier///\\\This Unruly Mess I've Made
  - "What It Is" (Remix)" : Jonathan Emile, Paul Cargnello & James Di Salvio of Bran Van 3000///\\\Party Gras
- 2017
  - "To nie jest hip-hop" : Quebonafide///\\\Egzotyka
  - "Let Us Begin" : Snoop Dogg///\\\Neva Left
- 2024
  - "Duck Down" : Chuckles with DJ Flip
- 2026
  - "Still Ill!" : Rakim, Kurupt, Masta Killa with Kool G Rap///\\\The Godbody LP

== See also ==
- Boogie Down Productions discography
