= Boogie Down Productions discography =

- Studio albums: 5
- Live albums: 1
- Compilation albums: 5
- Remix albums: 1

The discography of Boogie Down Productions consists of five studio albums, one live album and five compilation albums.

== Albums ==
=== Studio albums ===
List of studio albums, with selected chart positions and certifications
Title	Album details	Peak chart positions			Certifications
Title	Album details	US	US R&B /HH	UK	Certifications
Criminal Minded	Released: March 3, 1987; Label: B-Boy; Formats: CD, LP, cassette, digital download, streaming	—	73	—	
By All Means Necessary	Released: April 12, 1988; Label: Jive; Formats: CD, LP, cassette, digital download, streaming	75	18	38	RIAA: Gold
Ghetto Music: The Blueprint of Hip Hop	Released: July 4, 1989; Label: Jive; Formats: CD, LP, cassette, digital download, streaming	36	7	32	RIAA: Gold
Edutainment	Released: July 17, 1990; Label: Jive; Formats: CD, LP, cassette, digital download, streaming	32	9	52	RIAA: Gold
Sex and Violence	Released: February 25, 1992; Label: Jive; Formats: CD, LP, cassette, digital download, streaming	42	20	—	
"—" denotes releases that did not chart or were not released in that country.

=== Live albums ===
List of live albums, with selected chart positions
Title	Album details	Peak chart positions	
Title	Album details	US	US R&B /HH
Live Hardcore Worldwide	Released: March 12, 1991; Label: Jive; Formats: CD, LP, cassette, digital download	115	25

=== Instrumental albums ===
List of instrumental albums
Title	Album details
Criminal Minded (Hot-Club-Version)	Released: 1987; Label: B-Boy; Formats: CD, LP, cassette, digital download, streaming

=== Compilation albums ===
List of compilation albums, with selected chart positions
Title	Album details	Peak chart positions			
Title	Album details	US	US R&B /HH	UK R&B	UK Ind.
Word (Note: Also compiles works by Ms. Melodie.)	Released: July 1992; Label: Jive; Formats: CD	—	—	—	—
A Retrospective (Note: Although the album is credited to KRS-One, 11 of its 16 tracks are by Boogie Down Productions.)	Released: August 22, 2000; Label: Jive; Formats: CD, LP, Cassette, digital download	200	62	25	41
Best of B-Boy Records	Released: May 8, 2001; Label: Landspeed; Formats: CD, LP	—	—	—	—
Blast Master Tapes: Best of the B-Boy Sessions	Released: April 17, 2006; Label: Traffic Entertainment Group; Formats: CD	—	—	—	—
South Bronx Teachings: A Collection of Boogie Down Productions	Released: March 19, 2011; Label: B-Boy/Traffic Entertainment Group; Formats: LP, digital download	—	—	—	—

=== Remix albums ===
List of remix albums
Title	Album details
Man & His Music (Remixes from Around the World)	Released: 1987; Label: B-Boy; Formats: CD, LP, Cassette, digital download

== Extended plays ==
List of EPs
Title	EP details
Jive Classic 12" #1: My Philosophy/Jimmy/I'm Still #1 (compilation EP)	Released: 1997; Label: Jive; Format: LP
Jive Classic 12" #2: Jack of Spades/You Must Learn (compilation EP)	Released: 1997; Label: Jive; Format: LP
Jive Classic 12" #3: Love's Gonna Get'cha (Material Love)/The Kenny Parker Show/Ya Know the Rules/100 Guns (compilation EP)	Released: 1997; Label: Jive; Format: LP

=== Promotional EPs ===
List of extended plays
Title	Details
Do You Really Want World Peace (compilation EP)	Released: 1989; Label: V2; Formats: cassette

== Singles ==
=== As lead artist ===
List of singles with selected chart positions, showing year released and album name
Title	Year	Peak chart positions			Album
Title	Year	US R&B	US Rap	UK	Album
"$ucce$$ I$ the Word" (Note: Published as "12:41")	1985	—	*	—	Originally a non-album release (Note: "$ucce$$ I$ the Word" was later added to reissues Criminal Minded Deluxe Edition.)
"Advance" (Note: Published as "Scott La Rock & the Celebrity Three")	1986	—	*	—	Man & His Music (Remixes from Around the World)
"Say No Brother (Crack Attack Don't Do It)" (featuring Mark Gibbons)	1986	—	*	—	Originally a non-album release (Note: "Say No Brother (Crack Attack Don't Do It)" was later added to reissues Criminal Minded Deluxe Edition.)
"South Bronx"	1986	—	*	—	Criminal Minded
"My 9mm Goes Bang"	1986	—	*	—	Criminal Minded
"The Bridge Is Over"	1987	—	*	—	Criminal Minded
"Poetry"	1987	—	*	—	Criminal Minded
"My Philosophy"	1988	—	*	68	By All Means Necessary
"Stop the Violence"	1988	76	*	68	By All Means Necessary
"I'm Still #1"	1988	—	*	—	By All Means Necessary
"Jack of Spades"	1988	—	3	92	I'm Gonna Git You Sucka Soundtrack and Ghetto Music: The Blueprint of Hip Hop
"You Must Learn"	1989	—	15	—	Ghetto Music: The Blueprint of Hip Hop
"Why Is That?"	1989	48	5	93	Ghetto Music: The Blueprint of Hip Hop
"Bo! Bo! Bo!"	1989	—	—	—	Ghetto Music: The Blueprint of Hip Hop
"Love's Gonna Get'cha (Material Love)"	1990	46	4	—	Edutainment
"Ya Know the Rules"	1990	—	—	—	Edutainment
"Duck Down"	1992	—	16	—	Sex and Violence
"13 and Good"	1992	—	—	—	Sex and Violence
"We in There"	1992	—	—	—	Sex and Violence
"Black Cop"	1993	—	—	—	Non-album single (Note: "Black Cop" was credited as a KRS-One solo track on the CB4 soundtrack album and KRS-One's debut solo album, Return of the Boom Bap.)
"Super-Hoe"	1998	—	—	—	Criminal Minded
"A Crate of BDP" (as The Bassbin Twins vs. Boogie Down Productions) (Note: "A Crate of BDP" was released as a split single with "I Left My Wallet in El Segundo (Vampire Mix)" by A Tribe Called Quest and "Five Minutes of Funk (Icey's 7" Magic)" by Whodini.)	1999	—	—	—	Old School vs. New School
"Elementary"	2017	—	—	—	Criminal Minded
"—" denotes releases that did not chart or were not released in that country. "*" indicates a chart that did not exist at the time.

== See also ==
- KRS-One discography
