= A Retrospective (KRS-One album) =

Compilation album by KRS-One
- Released: August 22, 2000
- Recorded: 1986–1997
- Genre: Hip hop
- Length: 74:30
- Label: Jive
- Producer: DJ Premier; Jesse West; KRS-One; Pal Joey; Scott La Rock; Showbiz

KRS-One chronology
I Got Next (1997)	A Retrospective (2000)	The Sneak Attack (2001)

Singles from A Retrospective
- 1. "South Bronx" Released: 1986; 2. "The Bridge Is Over" Released: March 3, 1987; 3. "My Philosophy" Released: 1988; 4. "Jack of Spades" Released: 1989; 5. "Why Is That?" Released: 1989; 6. "You Must Learn" Released: 1989; 7. "Love's Gonna Get'cha (Material Love)" Released: July 5, 1990; 8. "Duck Down/Essays on BDP-Ism" Released: 1992; 9. "Outta Here" Released: September 3, 1993; 10. "Sound of da Police" Released: December 6, 1993; 11. "MC's Act Like They Don't Know" Released: August 28, 1995; 12. "Step into a World (Rapture's Delight)" Released: March 18, 1997

Professional ratings
Review scores
Source	Rating
AllMusic	4/5 stars
Entertainment Weekly	B+
Spin	8/10
The New Rolling Stone Album Guide	4/5 stars
The Village Voice	A−
Tom Hull	A

A Retrospective is a compilation album by American rapper and record producer KRS-One. It was released on August 22, 2000, via Jive Records, and composed of previously released songs from the rapper's previous studio albums as part of Boogie Down Productions (3 songs from Criminal Minded, 3 tracks from By All Means Necessary, 3 tracks from Ghetto Music: The Blueprint of Hip Hop, 1 song from Edutainment, and 1 song from the b-side of single "Duck Down" from Sex and Violence), as well as his solo studio albums (3 songs from Return of the Boom Bap, 1 song from KRS-One and 1 song from I Got Next). The track "Essays on BDP-Ism" was the last track ever featured DJ Scott La Rock.

The album peaked at number 200 on the Billboard 200 and number 62 on the Top R&B/Hip-Hop Albums chart in the United States.

== Track listing ==
No.	Title	Writer(s)	Producer(s)	Length
1.	"My Philosophy" (from the Boogie Down Productions album By All Means Necessary, 1988)	Lawrence Parker	KRS-One	5:37
2.	"I'm Still #1" (from the Boogie Down Productions album By All Means Necessary, 1988)	Parker	KRS-One	5:09
3.	"South Bronx" (from the Boogie Down Productions album Criminal Minded, 1987)	Parker; Scott Sterling	KRS-One; DJ Scott La Rock	5:08
4.	"Sound of da Police" (from the KRS-One album Return of the Boom Bap, 1993)	Parker	Showbiz	4:18
5.	"Love's Gonna Get'cha (Material Love)" (from the Boogie Down Productions album Edutainment, 1990)	Parker; Antoinette Colandero	Pal Joey	6:39
6.	"Step into a World (Rapture's Delight)" (from the KRS-One album I Got Next, 1997)	Parker; Jesse West; Deborah Harry; Christopher Stein; Harry Palmer	3rd Eye	4:50
7.	"You Must Learn" (from the Boogie Down Productions album Ghetto Music: The Blueprint of Hip Hop, 1989)	Parker	KRS-One; D-Nice (co.); D-Square (co.); Rebekah Foster (co.); Spaceman (co.); Sidney Mills (co.)	3:51
8.	"Jack of Spades" (from the Boogie Down Productions album Ghetto Music: The Blueprint of Hip Hop, 1989)	Parker	KRS-One; D-Nice (co.); D-Square (co.); Rebekah Foster (co.); Spaceman (co.); Sidney Mills (co.)	4:50
9.	"The Bridge Is Over" (from the Boogie Down Productions album Criminal Minded, 1987)	Parker; Sterling	KRS-One; DJ Scott La Rock	3:26
10.	"Jimmy" (from the Boogie Down Productions album By All Means Necessary, 1988)	Parker	KRS-One	4:12
11.	"Criminal Minded" (from the Boogie Down Productions album Criminal Minded, 1987)	Parker; Sterling	KRS-One; DJ Scott La Rock	5:18
12.	"Black Cop" (from the KRS-One album Return of the Boom Bap, 1993)	Parker	KRS-One	2:59
13.	"MC's Act Like They Don't Know" (from the KRS-One album KRS-One, 1995)	Parker; Christopher Martin	DJ Premier	4:44
14.	"Why Is That?" (from the Boogie Down Productions album Ghetto Music: The Blueprint of Hip Hop, 1989)	Parker	KRS-One; D-Nice (co.); D-Square (co.); Rebekah Foster (co.); Spaceman (co.); Sidney Mills (co.)	3:56
15.	"Outta Here" (from the KRS-One album Return of the Boom Bap, 1993)	Parker	DJ Premier	4:29
16.	"Essays on BDP-Ism" (from the Boogie Down Productions single "Duck Down", 1992)	Parker	KRS-One	5:04
Total length:				1:14:30

Sample credits

- Track 4 contains a sample of "Inside Looking Out" written by John Lomax, Alan Lomax, Eric Burdon, Bryan Chandler, performed by Grand Funk Railroad
- Track 5 contains a sample from "Love's Gonna Get You Baby" written by Antoinette 'Toni C.' Colandero, performed by Jocelyn Brown
- Track 6 contains a portion of the composition "Rapture" written by Debbie Harry and Chris Stein, and a sample of "The Champ" written by Harry Palmer and performed by The Mohawks

Notes

- Tracks 3, 9 and 11 are taken from the Boogie Down Productions album Criminal Minded ℗ 1987 B-Boy Records/Big East Entertainment Group
- Tracks 1, 2 and 10 are taken from the Boogie Down Productions album By All Means Necessary ℗ 1988 Zomba Recording Corporation
- Tracks 7, 8 and 14 are taken from the Boogie Down Productions album Ghetto Music: The Blueprint of Hip Hop ℗ 1989 Zomba Recording Corporation
- Track 5 is taken from the Boogie Down Productions album Edutainment ℗ 1990 Zomba Recording Corporation
- Track 16 is taken from the Boogie Down Productions single "Duck Down" ℗ 1992 Zomba Recording Corporation
- Tracks 4, 12 and 15 are taken from the KRS-One album Return of the Boom Bap ℗ 1993 Zomba Recording Corporation
- Track 13 is taken from the KRS-One album KRS-One ℗ 1995 Zomba Recording Corporation
- Track 6 is taken from the KRS-One album I Got Next ℗ 1997 Zomba Recording Corporation

== Charts ==
Chart performance for A Retrospective
Chart (2000)	Peak position
UK Independent Albums (OCC)	41
UK R&B Albums (OCC)	25
US Billboard 200	200
US Top R&B/Hip-Hop Albums (Billboard)	62
