= Digital (album) =

D.I.G.I.T.A.L.

Compilation album by KRS-One
- Released: November 25, 2003
- Genre: Hip hop
- Length: 1:09:13
- Label: Front Page; X-Ray
- Producer: DJ Premier; Kenny Parker; Kid Capri; KRS-One
- Compiler: Jeffrey Collins

KRS-One chronology
Kristyles (2003)	D.I.G.I.T.A.L. (2003)	Keep Right (2004)

Professional ratings
Review scores
Source	Rating
AllMusic	2.5/5 stars
RapReviews	8/10

D.I.G.I.T.A.L. is a compilation album by American rapper and record producer KRS-One. It was released on November 25, 2003 via Front Page Entertainment and X-Ray Records. The album is composed of a number of songs previously only released on white label 12" singles and B-sides with a few remixes and KRS-One cameos on other artist records.

Many of the tracks here have been given different titles from their original releases. For example, "As You Already Know" was originally released as a single by Truck Turner under the name "Symphony 2000" while "When The Moon" was called "Aquarius" when it first was released as a limited KRS-One 12" single around 1999.

== Track listing ==
1. "Intro: You Know What's Up!"
2. "For Example"
  - Incorporates lyrics from "Get Your Self Up" by KRS-One
3. "Tell the Devil Ha!"
  - Contains a sample from "Dernier Domicile Connu" by François de Roubaix
4. "When the Moon"
  - Featuring: Courtney Terry
5. "Free Mumia"
  - Featuring: Channel Live
  - Contains a sample from "Hard to Handle" by Otis Redding
6. "Ah Yeah!"
7. "Bring It to the Cypher"
  - Featuring: Truck Turner
  - Produced by DJ Premier
8. "As You Already Know"
  - Featuring: Truck Turner, Big Punisher, Kool G Rap
  - Contains a sample from "The Symphony" by Juice Crew
9. "A Freestyle Song"
  - Featuring: Common
10. "Article (Remix)"
  - Featuring: Mad Lion, Shelly Thunder, Whitey Don
11. "Music for the '90s"
  - Featuring: G. Simone
  - Produced by Kid Capri
  - Contains a sample from "Why Is That?" by Boogie Down Productions
12. "Let It Flow (Get You in the Mood)"
  - Featuring: Courtney Terry
13. "Remember"
14. "No Wack DJ's"
15. "We Don't Care Anymore"
16. "Smilin' Faces"
  - Featuring: Shock G.
17. "Hiphop Vs. Rap"
18. "Woop! Woop! (Showbiz Remix)"
  - Incorporates "Sound of da Police" by KRS-One
19. "Harmony and Understanding"
20. "Outro: I'll Be Back"
