= Live Hardcore Worldwide =

Live album by Boogie Down Productions
- Released: March 12, 1991
- Genre: Hip-hop
- Length: 63:55
- Labels: Jive/RCA, 1425-J
- Producer: KRS-One

Boogie Down Productions chronology
Edutainment (1990)	Live Hardcore Worldwide (1991)	Sex and Violence (1992)

Professional ratings
Review scores
Source	Rating
AllMusic	2.5/5 stars
Entertainment Weekly	A+
The Phoenix	(favorable)
Q Magazine	3/5 stars
Rolling Stone	4/5 stars
The Rolling Stone Album Guide	3/5 stars
The Source	4/5 stars
Trouser Press	(favorable)

Live Hardcore Worldwide is a live album released by Boogie Down Productions. It is a career-spanning collection that was recorded in the US, Paris and London. The release features KRS-One prominently.

In his review for The Source Chris Wild wrote "BDP fans should buy this album. So should anyone who is interested in what a real hip-hop show sounds like." Mark Cooper of Q Magazine noted that the release "features KRS-1 (sic) at his hectoring, militant best in front of audiences who are too often rather subdued in the mix".

== Track listing ==
1. "KRS-One Intro" (New Track)
2. "Lick a Shot" (New Track)
3. "The Eye Opener" (New Track)
4. "Jack of Spades" (From Ghetto Music: The Blueprint of Hip Hop)
5. "My Philosophy" (From By All Means Necessary)
6. "Still #1 (Freestyle)" (New Track)
7. "Poetry" (From Criminal Minded)
8. "House Nigga's" (From Edutainment)
9. "Criminal Minded" (From Criminal Minded)
10. "Jimmy" (From By All Means Necessary)
11. "The Bridge Is Over" (From Criminal Minded)
12. "Ya Know the Rules" (From Edutainment)
13. "Kenny Parker Intro" (From Edutainment)
14. "South Bronx" (From Criminal Minded)
15. "Reggae Medley" (New Track)
16. "Super Hoe" (From Criminal Minded)
17. "Up to Date" (New Track)
18. "Why Is That" (From Ghetto Music: The Blueprint of Hip Hop)
19. "Stop the Violence" (From By All Means Necessary)
20. "Bo Bo Bo" (From Ghetto Music: The Blueprint of Hip Hop)
21. "Come to the Teacher" (Originally "T'Cha-T'Cha" From By All Means Necessary)
22. "Breath Control II" (From Edutainment)
23. "Self Destruction" (New Track)
24. "KRS-One Outro" (New Track)

== Charts ==
Chart (1991)	Peak position
US Billboard 200	115
US Top R&B/Hip-Hop Albums (Billboard)	25
