= Billboard Year-End Hot Rap Singles of 1989 =

American music chart

This is a list of Billboard magazine's Top Hot Rap Singles of 1989.

No.	Title	Artist(s)
1	"Self Destruction"	The Stop the Violence Movement
2	"Me Myself and I"	De La Soul
3	"Bust a Move"	Young MC
4	"Fight the Power"	Public Enemy
5	"It's Funky Enough"	The D.O.C.
6	"Children's Story"	Slick Rick
7	"Express Yourself"	N.W.A
8	"Turn This Mutha Out"	MC Hammer
9	"Rollin' wit Kid 'n Play"	Kid 'n Play
10	"We Got Our Own Thang"	Heavy D & the Boyz
11	"Smooth Operator"	Big Daddy Kane
12	"Funky Dividends"	Three Times Dope
13	"They Want Money"	Kool Moe Dee
14	"The Man We All Know and Love"	Kwamé
15	"Me So Horny"	2 Live Crew
16	"Funky Cold Medina"	Tone Loc
17	"I'm That Type of Guy"	LL Cool J
18	"They Put Me in the Mix"	MC Hammer
19	"Girl You Know It's True"	Milli Vanilli
20	"Pump It Up"	MC Hammer
21	"Joy and Pain"	Rob Base & DJ E-Z Rock
22	"So Wat Cha Sayin'"	EPMD
23	"We Want Eazy"	Eazy-E
24	"Why Is That?"	Boogie Down Productions
25	"Life Is... Too Short"	Too Short
26	"Wild Thing"	Tone Loc
27	"Do the Right Thing"	Redhead Kingpin and the F.B.I.
28	"L.A. Posse"	Breeze
29	"Yeah! Yeah! Yeah!"	Oaktown's 357
30	"I Got it Made"	Special Ed

== See also ==
- 1989 in music
- Billboard Year-End Hot 100 singles of 1989
- Billboard Year-End Hot Black Singles of 1989
- List of Billboard number-one rap singles of 1989
