= The BDP Album =

Studio album by KRS-One
- Released: January 10, 2012
- Recorded: June–October 2011
- Genre: Hip-hop
- Length: 43:44
- Label: 6.8.2
- Producers: KRS-One (also exec.); Kenny Parker

KRS-One chronology
Royalty Check (2011)	The BDP Album (2012)	Now Hear This! (2015)

Professional ratings
Review scores
Source	Rating
AllMusic	3.5/5 stars
HipHopDX	3.5/5
Punknews.org	4/5 stars

The BDP Album is the eleventh solo studio album by American rapper and record producer KRS-One. It was released on January 10, 2012, through 6.8.2 Records, dedicated to reviving the crew name of Boogie Down Productions. The album was produced by DJ Kenny Parker and KRS-One. It features guest appearances from Channel Live, Inyang Bassey, and Jesse West.

== Track listing ==
All lyrics are written by Lawrence Parker, except track 3 written with Hakim Green, and track 12 written with Jesse Williams; all music is composed by Kenny Parker, except for track 13 composed by KRS-One.

No.	Title	Length
1.	"Kenny Parker Intro"	1:25
2.	"Tote Gunz"	3:23
3.	"Forever" (featuring Channel Live)	2:25
4.	"All Day"	4:09
5.	"The Solution"	3:31
6.	"Cypher Remix"	3:48
7.	"Introducing"	3:08
8.	"I Do This for You"	1:23
9.	"Comin' In"	2:51
10.	"Do It"	3:14
11.	"The Hustle"	3:13
12.	"Times Up" (featuring Jesse West)	3:14
13.	"2012"	3:34
14.	"What It Is / Outro" (featuring Inyang Bassey)	4:00
Total length:		43:44

== Personnel ==
- Lawrence Parker – main artist, mixing & producer (track 13), executive producer
- Channel Live – featured artist (track 3)
- Jesse Williams – featured artist (track 12)
- Inyang Bassey – featured artist (track 14)
- Kenny Parker – mixing & producer (tracks: 1–12, 14)
- Derek Showard – mastering
- Mr. Mass – cover photography
- Adam "Illus" Wallenta – artwork, design
- Dietrich Schoenemann – lacquer cut
