= Man & His Music (Remixes from Around the World) =

Remix album by Boogie Down Productions
- Released: 1987
- Genre: Hip-hop
- Length: N/A
- Label: B-Boy
- Producers: Ced-Gee; Scott La Rock; KRS-One

Boogie Down Productions chronology
Criminal Minded (1987)	Man & His Music (Remixes from Around the World) (1987)	By All Means Necessary (1988)

Professional ratings
Review scores
Source	Rating
AllMusic	2/5 stars
The Encyclopedia of Popular Music	2/5 stars
Record Collector	3/5 stars

Man & His Music (Remixes from Around the World) is a remix album by American hip-hop group Boogie Down Productions honouring the memory of DJ Scott La Rock. The album was re-issued on September 23, 1997.

== Critical reception ==
Trouser Press called the album "an unessential posthumous collection of remixes and early demos, including a track by D-Nice [the performer Rock was aiding when Rock was shot]." Record Collector wrote that "while always a pleasure to hear the brutally stripped-down sound which turned hip-hop upside-down when South Bronx appeared in 1986, spread over 75 minutes the reruns here sometimes threaten to compromise their impact."

== Track listing ==
1. "Advance"
2. "Poetry #1"
3. "BDP Medley #5"
4. "Word from Our Sponsor #8"
5. "Red Alert" (Criminal Minded)
6. "Super Hoe #4" (Mixed by DJ Spen and Thomas Gray in Baltimore)
7. "BDP Medley #7"
8. "BDP Medley #11"
9. "Doc Mix" (Criminal Minded)
10. "Poetry #2"
11. "Criminal Minded #8"
12. "D Nice Rocks the House"
13. "Poetry #3"
14. "Criminal Minded #6"
15. "? #10"
