= I Got Next =

Studio album by KRS-One
- Released: May 20, 1997
- Recorded: September 1996–January 1997
- Genre: East Coast hip hop; political hip hop
- Length: 51:50
- Label: Jive
- Producer: "Commissioner Gordon" Williams; DJ Cipher; DJ Muggs; Domingo; Jesse West; KRS-One; Showbiz; Thembisa

KRS-One chronology
The Battle for Rap Supremacy (1996)	I Got Next (1997)	A Retrospective (2000)

Singles from I Got Next
- 1. "Can't Stop, Won't Stop" Released: January 13, 1997; 2. "Word Perfect" Released: February 3, 1997; 3. "Step into a World (Rapture's Delight)" Released: March 18, 1997; 4. "Heartbeat" Released: July 21, 1997; 5. "A Friend" Released: July 28, 1997

Professional ratings
Review scores
Source	Rating
AllMusic	4/5 stars
Christgau's Consumer Guide	(1-star Honorable Mention)
Entertainment Weekly	A−
NME	7/10
Rolling Stone	3/5 stars
The Source	3.5/5 stars
USA Today	3/4 stars

I Got Next is the third solo studio album by American rapper KRS-One. It was released on May 20, 1997, via Jive Records. Production was handled by Domingo, Jesse West, Showbiz, Gordon "Commissioner Gordon" Williams, DJ Cipher, DJ Muggs, Thembisa, and KRS-One himself. It features guest appearances from Redman, Angie Martinez, Mic Vandalz, Thor-El and Puff Daddy.

In the United States the album peaked at number 3 on the Billboard 200 and number 2 on the Top R&B/Hip-Hop Albums with 95,000 copies sold in its first week. It was certified Gold by the Recording Industry Association of America on July 22, 1997, for selling 500,000 units. The album also made it to No. 18 in Canada, No. 90 in the Netherlands, and No. 95 in Germany.

== Track listing ==
No.	Title	Writer(s)	Producer(s)	Length
1.	"1st Quarter — The Commentary"		KRS-One	0:18
2.	"2nd Quarter — Free Throws"		KRS-One	2:06
3.	"The MC"	Lawrence Parker; Domingo Padilla	Domingo	3:15
4.	"I Got Next — Neva Hadda Gun"	Parker; Carlton Ridenhour; Eric Sadler; James Boxley	KRS-One	4:11
5.	"Heartbeat" (featuring Redman and Angie Martinez)	Parker; Reginald Noble; Kevin Keaton; Lamar Hill; Mohandas Dewese; Bobby Robinson	KRS-One	3:07
6.	"Step into a World (Rapture's Delight)"	Parker; Jesse West; Christopher Stein; Deborah Harry; Harry Palmer	Jesse West	4:50
7.	"A Friend"	Parker; Rodney LeMay; Bernard Hanighen; Charles Melvin Williams; Thelonious Monk	Showbiz	4:13
8.	"H.I.P.H.O.P." (featuring Thor-El)	Parker; Thor-El Harrison	KRS-One	2:11
9.	"Halftime"	Parker; Gordon Williams	"Commissioner Gordon" Williams	0:40
10.	"3rd Quarter — The Commentary"		KRS-One	0:17
11.	"Klassicks"		DJ Cipher; Thembisa	0:59
12.	"Blowe" (featuring Redman)	Parker; Noble; LeMay	Showbiz	3:41
13.	"Real Hip-Hop, Pt. 2" (featuring Mic Vandalz)	Parker; Stanley Griffith; Sharief Bouchet; Tom Hooks	KRS-One	3:06
14.	"Come to da Party"	Parker; Anthony Mills	KRS-One	2:10
15.	"Can't Stop, Won't Stop"	Parker; Lawrence Muggerud	DJ Muggs	3:59
16.	"Over Ya Head"	Parker; G. Simone	KRS-One; "Commissioner Gordon" Williams	2:17
17.	"Just to Prove a Point"	G. Simone; Edward Nappi; Peter Hines; Peter Mengede	KRS-One; Eddie Nappi (add.); Peter Hines (add.); Peter Mengede (add.)	3:45
18.	"4th Quarter — Free Throws"		KRS-One	1:46
19.	"Step into a World (Rapture's Delight) (Remix)" (featuring Puff Daddy)	Parker; West; Stein; Harry; Palmer; LeMay; Andre Barnes; Joseph Kirkland; Marcel Hall; Antonio Hardy; Marlon Williams	Jesse West	7:35
Total length:				45:51

== Charts ==
=== Weekly charts ===
Chart (1997)	Peak position
Canadian Albums (Billboard)	18
Dutch Albums (Album Top 100)	90
German Albums (Offizielle Top 100)	95
US Billboard 200	3
US Top R&B/Hip-Hop Albums (Billboard)	2

=== Year-end charts ===
Chart (1997)	Position
US Top R&B/Hip-Hop Albums (Billboard)	67

== Certifications ==
Region	Certification	Certified units/sales
Canada (Music Canada)	Gold	50,000^{^}
United States (RIAA)	Gold	500,000^{^}
^{^} Shipments figures based on certification alone.
