= The Sneak Attack =

Studio album by KRS-One
- Released: April 24, 2001
- Recorded: September 2000–January 2001
- Studio: Unique Recording Studios (New York, NY); Embassy Recording Studios (Los Angeles, CA); 7888 Recording Studio (Woodhaven, Queens)
- Genre: East Coast hip hop; political hip hop; hardcore hip hop
- Length: 57:49
- Label: Koch Records
- Producer: B.J. Wheeler; Domingo; Fredwreck; Grand Daddy I.U.; Kenny Parker; KRS-One; Mad Lion; MC Jazzy Jeff

KRS-One chronology
A Retrospective (2000)	The Sneak Attack (2001)	Best of B-Boy Records (2001)

Singles from The Sneak Attack
- 1. "Hot" Released: April 2001; 2. "Get Your Self Up" Released: August 14, 2001

The Sneak Attack is the fourth solo studio album by American musician KRS-One. It was released on April 24, 2001, via Koch Records. Recording sessions took place at Unique Recording Studios in New York and at Embassy Recording Studios in Los Angeles, with additional recording at 7888 Recording Studio in Woodhaven, Queens. Production was handled by Kenny Parker, Domingo, BJ Wheeler, Fredwreck, Grand Daddy I.U., Mad Lion, MC Jazzy Jeff, and KRS-One himself.

In the United States, the album peaked at number 43 on the Billboard 200, number 9 on the Top R&B/Hip-Hop Albums and topped the Independent Albums chart.

The song "Hush" appeared in the video game Tony Hawk's Pro Skater 3.

== Critical reception ==
Professional ratings
Aggregate scores
Source	Rating
Metacritic	69/100
Review scores
Source	Rating
AllMusic	3/5 stars
Alternative Press	3/5 stars
Blender	3/5 stars
Entertainment Weekly	C+
NME	3.5/5 stars
RapReviews	6.5/10
Rolling Stone	3/5 stars
Vibe	3/5 marks

The Sneak Attack was met with generally favorable reviews from music critics. At Metacritic, which assigns a normalized rating out of 100 to reviews from mainstream publications, the album received an average score of 69 based on eight reviews.

Sonicnet reviewer praised the artist, saying that KRS-One "delivers all this with passion and booming authority: the teacher is back in front of the classroom, where he belongs". Nathan Rabin of The A.V. Club stated: "as unmistakably old-school as a fat gold chain and a pair of unlaced Adidas sneakers.... He delivers a raw, grimy set of anthems as noncommercial as anything he's done". NME reviewer wrote: "as a sort of lyrical sermon from the mount with uptempo beats to crush the weak-hearted, The Sneak Attack raises the stakes on the microphone skills front as KRS-One lectures, hectors, drops streetwise politics, and laments the state of the world".

In mixed reviews, Alternative Press critic found out that the album "proves this pioneer and innovator's run is far from over". Writing for Rolling Stone, Neil Drumming said that the artist "still commands attention, but his booming voice and confidence now deliver warmer, fuzzier messages". Blender reviewer stated: "Sadly, Sneak Attack also reflects the influence of Professor One's recent ubiquity on the college-lecture circuit; windy speechifying interludes take up a third of the record. Too bad -- when he does rap, he shows twice the gusto of many rappers half his age". David Bry of Vibe claimed that "KRS-One sounds as hungry and passionate as ever.... Unfortunately, a barrage of rigid, same-sounding beats and canned choruses detracts from Attack's effectiveness". Evan Serpick of Entertainment Weekly wrote: "the most compelling lectures can't obscure KRS' drab old-school beats and samples".

== Track listing ==
No.	Title	Writer(s)	Producer(s)	Length
1.	"Intro"		KRS-One	0:19
2.	"Ghetto Lifestyles"	Lawrence Parker; William Broady	Kenny Parker	1:59
3.	"Attendance"	L. Parker	KRS-One	3:27
4.	"Hot"	L. Parker	Grand Daddy I.U.; MC Jazzy Jeff	3:00
5.	"Why"	L. Parker	KRS-One	2:38
6.	"Doth Thou Know"	L. Parker	KRS-One	0:51
7.	"The Lessin"	L. Parker; April S. Williams	Kenny Parker	4:32
8.	"The Mind"	L. Parker	KRS-One	3:53
9.	"Hiphop Knowledge"	L. Parker	Domingo	5:09
10.	"What Kinda World"	L. Parker; Broady	Domingo	3:24
11.	"I Will Make It"	L. Parker	Kenny Parker	2:25
12.	"B-Side" (Intro)	L. Parker	KRS-One	0:16
13.	"Get Your Self Up"	L. Parker	KRS-One	4:45
14.	"Krush Them"	L. Parker	Domingo	3:37
15.	"Hush"	L. Parker; Nyce	BJ Wheeler	3:55
16.	"The Sneak Attack"	L. Parker; Williams	Kenny Parker	4:18
17.	"Shutupayouface"	L. Parker	Fredwreck	3:44
18.	"False Pride"	L. Parker	KRS-One	2:39
19.	"The Raptizm"	L. Parker	Mad Lion	2:58
Total length:				57:49

== Personnel ==
- Lawrence "KRS-One" Parker – main artist, scratches (track 4), producer (tracks: 1, 3, 5, 6, 8, 12, 13, 18), mixing (tracks: 3, 5, 6, 8, 12–14, 16, 18), songwriter (tracks: 2–19)
- Harold English – backing vocals (track 1), co-producer, engineering (tracks: 1, 12, 14), editing (tracks: 2–6, 8–11, 13–16), engineering assistant (tracks: 17, 19)
- Nyce of the Breeze Team – additional vocals (tracks: 5, 15), songwriter (track 15)
- April S. Williams – additional vocals & songwriter (tracks: 7, 16), mixing (track 16)
- Hezekiah Walker Choir – additional vocals (tracks: 11, 19)
- William "Willie D." Broady – songwriter (tracks: 2, 10)
- Kenny Parker – producer (tracks: 2, 7, 11, 16), mixing (tracks: 7, 16)
- Ayyub Cave – producer (track 4)
- Jeffrey Miree – producer (track 4)
- Domingo Padilla – producer (tracks: 9, 10, 14), mixing (tracks: 9, 10), additional mixing (track 4)
- Bruno J. Wheeler – producer & mixing (track 15)
- Farid "Fredwreck" Nassar – producer (track 17)
- Oswald "Mad Lion" Priest – producer (track 19)
- Matt Hathaway – engineering (tracks: 2, 5, 9, 11, 14, 18), mixing (tracks: 2, 11, 18), editing (track 18)
- John Anderson – engineering (tracks: 3, 4, 6–10, 13, 15, 16), mixing (tracks: 4, 7, 15)
- "Filthy Rich" Richard Ahee – engineering (track 10)
- Milton Chan – engineering & mixing (tracks: 17, 19)
- Kaori Kinoshita – engineering assistant (tracks: 2, 5, 9, 14, 18)
- Lys – engineering assistant (tracks: 2, 11)
- Max Velez – engineering assistant (tracks: 3, 4, 13)
- Doug Robertson II – engineering assistant (tracks: 7, 8)
- Mike "Music Rocka" McCalla – engineering assistant (tracks: 8, 9, 15)
- Aaron K. – engineering assistant (track 10)
- Mike D. – engineering assistant (track 10)
- Makery Pacius – engineering assistant (track 14)
- Jowan – engineering assistant (track 16)
- Simone Parker – executive producer
- George DelGiorno – design
- Benoît Peverelli – photography
- Adam Jaynes – A&R
- Cliff Cultreri – A&R
- Dee Sonaram – marketing
- Duncan Stanbury – lacquer cut
- Scott "DJ Scott La Rock" Monroe Sterling – overseen by

== Charts ==
Chart (2001)	Peak position
US Billboard 200	43
US Top R&B/Hip-Hop Albums (Billboard)	9
US Independent Albums (Billboard)	1
