= InsPirEd =

Studio album by PE 2.0
- Released: October 11, 2015
- Genre: Hip hop, political hip hop
- Length: 32:00
- Label: Spit Digital

PE 2.0 chronology
People Get Ready (2014)	InsPirEd (2015)

InsPirEd is the second studio album by American hip hop group and Public Enemy spin-off PE 2.0. The album was released on October 11, 2015 and includes collaborations with Hip Hop icons KRS-One, Easy Mo Bee and Jam Master Jay. As with PE 2.0's debut album "InsPirEd" is a mixture of homage and updates to Public Enemy (band) material as well as new original tracks by Jahi.

The title track "InsPirEd" is instrumental track "Either We Together or We Ain't" from Public Enemy's New Whirl Odor with lyrics added by Jahi. "Roll Call" samples "Timebomb" from Public Enemy's first album Yo! Bum Rush the Show and "Louder Than a Bomb", originally from Public Enemy's It Takes a Nation of Millions to Hold Us Back is a remix by Jam Master Jay with new vocals by Jahi.

KRS-One also makes guest appearances on "BLK THSS" and "Crowdrockers".

== Track listing ==
No.	Title	Writer(s)	Length
1.	"InsPirEd"	Jahi	1:45
2.	"BLK THSS (featuring KRS-One)"	Jahi, Kris Parker	3:53
3.	"Survival"	Jahi	3:31
4.	"BLKLVMTTRS"	Jahi	3:13
5.	"Beats and Rhymes"	Jahi	3:52
6.	"Crowdrockers (featuring KRS-One)"	Jahi, Kris Parker	4:49
7.	"Louder Than a Bomb (Jam Master Jay Mix)"	Carl Ridenhour	3:36
8.	"Return of That Bambaataa"	Jahi	3:37
9.	"BLKTLK"	Jahi	1:16
Total length:			32:00
