= People Get Ready (PE 2.0 album) =

Studio album by PE 2.0
- Released: October 7, 2014
- Genre: Hip hop, political hip hop
- Length: 34:15
- Label: Spit Digital

PE 2.0 chronology
People Get Ready (2014)	InsPirEd (2015)

People Get Ready is the debut studio album of Public Enemy spin-off project PE 2.0. The album was released on October 7, 2014.

As the "next generation" of Public Enemy, PE 2.0's philosophy is to "take select songs from the PE catalog and cover or reVisit them" as well as new material with members of the original Public Enemy including DJ Lord, Davy DMX, Professor Griff and Chuck D. The album includes numerous samples from the original Public Enemy and two explicit covers with new lyrics - "What They Need" an update of the Public Enemy track "Gotta Give the Peeps What They Need" from the 2002 album Revolverlution and "Yo!", a cover of "Yo! Bum Rush the Show" from Public Enemy's first album in 1987.

Public Enemy frontman Chuck D also makes guest appearances on the title track "People Get Ready" and "Yo!".

== Track listing ==
No.	Title	Length
1.	"People Get Ready (featuring Chuck D)"	2:43
2.	"What They Need"	3:38
3.	"Panther Power"	4:07
4.	"Soul Revisited"	4:01
5.	"Greatness"	2:09
6.	"Mind Over Matter"	3:48
7.	"World Beat"	2:23
8.	"Beautiful Wonderful"	3:15
9.	"This Side Rides"	4:05
10.	"Yo! (featuring Chuck D)"	4:05
Total length:		34:15
