= Self Destruction (song) =

Single by The Stop the Violence Movement
- Released: January 15, 1989
- Recorded: 1989
- Studio: Power Play Studios, Chung King (New York City)
- Genre: East Coast hip hop, golden age hip hop
- Label: Jive; RCA
- Songwriters: Glenn Bolton, Douglas E. Davis, Mohandas Dewese, William Jonathan Drayton Jr., Arnold Hamilton, Derrick T. Jones, Dwight Myers, Lawrence Parker, Ramona Parker, Carlton Douglas Ridenhour, James Todd Smith, Joseph Williams and Marvin Shahid Wright
- Producers: KRS-One, D-Nice; Hank Shocklee (Assoc.)

Music video
- "Self Destruction" on YouTube

"Self Destruction" is the only single by the Stop the Violence Movement, a group formed by American rapper KRS-One in 1988 in response to violence in the hip hop and African American communities.

The single raised over $100,000 that was donated to the National Urban League.

"Self Destruction" was the top rap single of 1989, reaching the number-one spot on the Billboard Year-End Hot Rap Singles of 1989 becoming the first song to top Billboard's year-end rap chart.

== Background ==
After a young fan was killed at a 1988 Boogie Down Productions and Public Enemy show, KRS-One formed the Stop the Violence Movement in hopes of encouraging the hip hop community to end violence being committed among themselves. Further inspired by the recent murder of fellow BDP founding member Scott La Rock, he assembled many contemporary East Coast hip hop rap stars of the time to record a song about anti-violence. With production assistance by bandmate D-Nice and Hank Shocklee of the Bomb Squad, the product of the session was the chart-topping song "Self Destruction". All proceeds went to the National Urban League. A VHS cassette entitled Overcoming Self-Destruction—the Making of the Self-Destruction Video accompanied the song's release.

The song debuted at No. 1 on the first week of Billboard's Hot Rap Songs existence and held the spot for ten consecutive weeks.

The following rappers contributed the vocals to the song:

- KRS-One (Boogie Down Productions)
- D-Nice (Boogie Down Productions)
- Ms. Melodie (Boogie Down Productions)
- Daddy-O (Stetsasonic)
- MC Delite (Stetsasonic)
- Wise (Stetsasonic)
- Frukwan (Stetsasonic)
- Kool Moe Dee
- MC Lyte
- Doug E. Fresh (Doug E. Fresh and The Get Fresh Crew)
- Just-Ice
- Heavy D (Heavy D & the Boyz)
- Chuck D (Public Enemy)
- Flavor Flav (Public Enemy)

Big Daddy Kane also makes an appearance in the video, but is only seen in the background.

The song samples "Funky Drummer" by James Brown, "Pass the Peas" by the JB's, and "Heaven and Hell is on Earth" by the 20th Century Steel Band.

== Music video ==
The music video was filmed in the neighborhood of Harlem in the borough of Manhattan in New York City. West Coast rappers Tone Loc and Young MC, along with Digital Underground frontman Shock G, visited the video shoot and participated in the event.

== Later recordings ==
In 2007, in preparation for the original track's 20th anniversary, KRS-One relaunched the Stop the Violence Movement. This resulted in two new iterations of the original concept – "Self Construction" and "Self Destruction 2009".

"Self Construction" was released first in April 2008. The track was produced by Duane DaRock and recorded in Los Angeles from February 7 to 9 at the Los Angeles Recording School. "Self Construction" includes appearances by over 55 artists including David Banner, The Game, Nelly, Redman, MC Lyte, 50 Cent, Ne-Yo, Talib Kweli, Method Man, Styles P, Busta Rhymes, Fat Joe, Cassidy, Wise Intelligent, Awol One, 2Mex, Rah Digga and Rakaa.

"Self Destruction 2009" was released in late 2008 and features contributions by Twista, Syleena Johnson, Phil G, Crucial Conflict, Kenny Bogus, Straw and Pugz Atomz.

Also in 2008, Jersey City rapper Heat recorded "Self Destruction 2" with the help of other local area rappers.

In late 2009, DJ Kay Slay produced "Self Destruction 2010" featuring Busta Rhymes, Bun B, Sheek Louch, Papoose, Uncle Murda and Jay Rock.

In 2014, more than a dozen Baltimore rappers united under the name Stop the Violence Baltimore and recorded their own version of the song with new lyrics pertinent to violence in their city at the time.

== Single track listing ==
=== 12" vinyl ===
==== A-Side ====
1. "Self Destruction" (Extended Mix) (5:52)
2. "Self Destruction" (Special Remix) (5:57)

==== B-Side ====
1. "Self Destruction" (Single Edit) (5:28)
2. "Self Destruction" (Instrumental) (5:28)

== Personnel ==
Credits are taken from the liner notes and the official page of the ASCAP.

- Written by – Glenn Bolton, Douglas E. Davis, Mohandas Dewese, William Jonathan Drayton Jr., Arnold Hamilton, Derrick T. Jones, Dwight Myers, Lawrence Parker, Ramona Parker, Carlton Douglas Ridenhour, James Todd Smith, Joseph Williams and Marvin Shahid Wright
- Producer – KRS-One and D-Nice
- Co-producer – Hank Shocklee
- Keyboards, Horns – DBC
- Mastered by – Herb Powers Jr. (as Herbie Jr :^)*)
- Engineer – Eric Calvi
- Producer (exec.) – Tom Silverman

== Charts ==
=== Weekly charts ===
| Chart (1989) | Peak position |
|---|---|
| New Zealand (Recorded Music NZ) | 33 |
| UK Singles (Official Charts) | 75 |
| US Hot Dance Singles Sales (Billboard) | 7 |
| US Hot R&B/Hip-Hop Songs (Billboard) | 30 |
| US Hot Rap Songs (Billboard) | 1 |

=== Year-end charts ===
| Chart (1989) | Peak position |
|---|---|
| Billboard Hot Rap Singles (Billboard) | 1 |

== Certifications ==
| Region | Certification | Certified units/sales |
|---|---|---|
| United States (RIAA) | Gold | 500,000^{^} |
^{^} Shipments figures based on certification alone.

== See also ==
- "We're All in the Same Gang"
