= Sex and Violence (album) =

Studio album by Boogie Down Productions
- Released: February 25, 1992
- Recorded: July–November 1991
- Studios: Street Music Studio & Battery Studios, NYC
- Genres: East Coast hip-hop; hardcore hip-hop
- Labels: Jive, 01241-41470
- Producers: KRS-One; Pal Joey; Prince Paul; DJ Kenny Parker; D-Square

Boogie Down Productions chronology
Live Hardcore Worldwide (1991)	Sex and Violence (1992)	Return of the Boom Bap (1993)

Singles from Sex and Violence
- 1. "13 and Good" Released: February 1992; 2. "Duck Down" Released: April 1992; 3. "We in There" Released: July 1992

Professional ratings
Review scores
Source	Rating
AllMusic	3/5 stars
Chicago Tribune	3.5/4 stars
Robert Christgau	A−
The Encyclopedia of Popular Music	3/5 stars
Entertainment Weekly	B+
Tom Hull – on the Web	A−
Los Angeles Times	2/4 stars
RapReviews	9/10
The Rolling Stone Album Guide	3/5 stars
The Source	4.5/5

Sex and Violence is the fifth and final album released by American hip-hop group Boogie Down Productions. The next year, 1993, the group's lead member, KRS-One, would begin recording under his own name.

The track "Build And Destroy" deals with KRS-One's ideological differences—as a self-proclaimed humanist—with X Clan and its brand of Afrocentrism. Previously, and on numerous occasions, the X-Clan had denounced any association with the concept, instead affirming its pro-Black stance. This, according to KRS-One's younger brother and Boogie Down Production's DJ Kenny Parker, was an insinuation that KRS was a "sell-out". Both parties have since reconciled their differences and on X-Clan's Return from Mecca album.

KRS One has stated that the album has sold about 250,000 copies, half of what the previous BDP album (Edutainment) sold. KRS-One has stated that he believes this was due to an incident that year, in which BDP stormed the stage during a concert performance by alternative hip-hop duo PM Dawn, which was in retaliation for the latter's published comments that questioned KRS-One being a self-proclaimed "teacher".

The album track "Say Gal" was written about the rape trial of professional boxer Mike Tyson.

== Track listing ==
#	Title	Producer(s)	Performer (s)
1	"The Original Way"	D-Square; Kenny Parker	Freddie Foxxx; KRS-One; Kid Capri
2	"Duck Down"	Pal Joey	KRS-One
3	"Drug Dealer"	Prince Paul	KRS-One
4	"Like a Throttle"	Kenny Parker	KRS-One
5	"Build and Destroy"	Kenny Parker	KRS-One; Kenny Parker; Willie D.
6	"Ruff Ruff"	D-Square	KRS-One; Freddie Foxxx
7	"13 and Good"	Pal Joey	KRS-One; Kenny Parker; Heather B.
8	"Poisonous Products"	Kenny Parker	KRS-One
9	"Questions and Answers"	Pal Joey	KRS-One; Willie D.
10	"Say Gal"	KRS-One	KRS-One; Kenny Parker
11	"We in There"	Kenny Parker	KRS-One; Kenny Parker; Willie D.
12	"Sex and Violence"	Prince Paul	KRS-One
13	"How Not to Get Jerked"	Prince Paul	KRS-One
14	"Who Are The Pimps?"	Pal Joey	KRS-One
15	"The Real Holy Place"	D-Square; KRS-One	KRS-One

== Chart positions ==
Chart (1992)	Peak position
US Billboard 200	42
US Top R&B/Hip-Hop Albums (Billboard)	20

== See also ==
- Michel Foucault regarding the intersection of the technique KRS-One used on "Questions and Answers" of interviewing himself, and themes of sex and violence.
