= Adventures in Emceein =

Studio album by KRS-One
- Released: February 19, 2008
- Recorded: November 2006–November 2007
- Genre: Hip-hop
- Length: 60:34
- Label: Echo-Vista
- Producers: Adam Deitch; Adam Smirnoff; Alex Track; Bam Beats; Chris "Max" Pinset; Duane "DaRock" Ramos; Enoch; James "Desi" Desmond; KDL; KRS-One; Lounge Lizzards; M.I.C.; Nick Kasper; Panauh Kalayeh; QF; Robert Hernandez; Stevie J

KRS-One chronology
Hip Hop Lives (2007)	Adventures in Emceein (2008)	Maximum Strength (2008)

Professional ratings
Review scores
Source	Rating
AllMusic	3/5 stars
RapReviews	7/10

Adventures in Emceein is the ninth solo studio album by American rapper KRS-One. It was released in early 2008 via Echo-Vista. Production was handled by Duane "DaRock" Ramos, Adam Deitch, Alex Track, Chris Pinset, KDL, Lounge Lizzards, M.I.C., QF, Adam Smirnoff, Bam Beats, Enoch, James Desmond, Nick Kasper, Panauh Kalayeh, Robert Hernandez, Stevie J and KRS-One himself, with Jeffrey Collins serving as executive producer. It features guest appearances from S-Five, Carlet Boseman, Chuck D, Cx, Keith Stewart, MC Lyte, Non-Stop, Pee-Doe, Vince Flores, Just Blaze, Nas and Rakim.

== Track listing ==
No.	Title	Producer(s)	Length
1.	"Intro" (featuring Rakim)		0:16
2.	"Today's Topics" (featuring Chuck D)	Enoch	0:54
3.	"Our Soldiers" (featuring CX)	Adam Deitch; Chris 'Max' Pinset	3:39
4.	"Money" (featuring MC Lyte)	Adam Smirnoff; Chris 'Max' Pinset; Nick Kasper	3:41
5.	"We Dem Teachas" (featuring Keith Stewart)	Duane "Da Rock" Ramos; Robert Hernandez	3:23
6.	"Better & Better" (featuring Pee-Doe)	Duane "Da Rock" Ramos; James Desmond; Panauh Kalayeh	2:56
7.	"The Way It's Goin' Down"	Adam Deitch	2:41
8.	"The Teacha Returns"	Bam Beats	2:22
9.	"The Real Hiphop" (featuring Nas)	M.I.C.	3:05
10.	"Watch This!" (featuring S-Five)	KDL	2:49
11.	"What's Your Plan?"	Alex Track	3:31
12.	"All Right" (featuring Just Blaze)	Stevie J	2:36
13.	"Don't Get So High" (Dancehall Mix)	QF	2:53
14.	"I Got You"	M.I.C.	2:37
15.	"All My Love" (featuring Carlet Boseman)	Duane "Da Rock" Ramos	3:10
16.	"Over 30" (Remix)	Lounge Lizzards	3:08
17.	"Getaway"	Lounge Lizzards	3:07
18.	"Don't Give It Up" (featuring S-Five)	QF	3:43
19.	"Gro---oh! (Hiphop Nation)" (featuring S-Five)	KRS-One	3:24
20.	"It's All Love" (featuring Non Stop)	KDL	3:42
21.	"Wachanoabout" (featuring Vince Flores)	Alex Track	2:57
Total length:			60:34
