= Step into a World (Rapture's Delight) =

Single by KRS-One

from the album I Got Next
- Released: March 3, 1997
- Recorded: 1996
- Studio: The Hit Factory (New York, NY)
- Genre: Hip hop
- Length: 4:50
- Label: Jive
- Songwriters: Lawrence Parker; Jesse West; Christopher Stein; Deborah Harry; Harry Palmer
- Producer: Jesse West

KRS-One singles chronology
| "Word Perfect" (1997) | "Step into a World (Rapture's Delight)" (1997) | "Heartbeat" (1997) |

Music video
- "Step Into A World (Rapture's Delight)" on YouTube

"Step into a World (Rapture's Delight)" is a song performed by American rapper KRS-One. It was released on March 3, 1997 via Jive Records as a single from his third solo studio album I Got Next. Recording sessions took place at The Hit Factory in New York City. Produced by Jesse West, the song contains a portion of the composition "Rapture" written by Debbie Harry and Chris Stein, and a sample of the Mohawks' "The Champ" written by Harry Palmer.

The single peaked at number 10 in New Zealand, number 24 on the UK Singles Chart and number 70 on the US Billboard Hot 100.

The song was later used in 2002 video game BMX XXX, in Seth Rogen's 2013 movie This Is the End, in Ian Edelman's 2018 movie The After Party, and in the eighth episode of 2020 miniseries The Last Dance. In 2024, it was featured on the sound track of NBA 2K25.

== Personnel ==
- Lawrence "KRS-One" Parker — rapping vocals, songwriter, arrangement, mixing
- Keva Hargrove — lead vocals
- Jesse West — songwriter, producer, mixing
- "Commissioner Gordon" Williams — engineering
- Ted Wohlsen — engineering assistant
- Tony Dawsey — mastering
- Alexander Maslatzides — design, photography
- Simone Allen — photography
- Jay Kramer — management
- Wesley Powell — management

== Charts ==
=== Weekly charts ===
| Chart (1997) | Peak position |
|---|---|
| New Zealand (Recorded Music NZ) | 10 |
| Scotland Singles (OCC) | 47 |
| UK Singles (OCC) | 24 |
| UK Dance (OCC) | 4 |
| UK Hip Hop/R&B (OCC) | 6 |
| US Billboard Hot 100 | 70 |
| US Hot R&B/Hip-Hop Songs (Billboard) | 22 |
| US R&B/Hip-Hop Airplay (Billboard) | 26 |
| US Hot Rap Songs (Billboard) | 8 |

=== Year-end charts ===
| Chart (1997) | Position |
|---|---|
| UK Urban (Music Week) | 38 |
