= Hip Hop Lives =

Studio album by KRS-One and Marley Marl
- Released: May 22, 2007
- Recorded: October 2006–February 2007
- Studios: House Of Hits (New York, NY); Westlake Studios (Los Angeles, CA)
- Genres: East Coast hip-hop; hardcore hip-hop
- Length: 46:24
- Label: Koch Records
- Producers: Simone Parker (exec.); Rick Martin (co-exec.); Marley Marl (also co-exec.); 88-Fingers

KRS-One chronology
Life (2006)	Hip Hop Lives (2007)	Adventures in Emceein (2008)

Marley Marl chronology
Re Entry (2001)	Hip Hop Lives (2007)	Operation Take Back Hip-Hop (2008)

Professional ratings
Review scores
Source	Rating
AllMusic	2.5/5 stars
HipHopDX	4/5
MSN Music	(dud)
Now	3/5
PopMatters	5/10
RapReviews	8/10
Spin	3/5 stars
XXL	3/5 (L)

Hip Hop Lives is the collaborative studio album by American rapper KRS-One and record producer Marley Marl. It was released on May 22, 2007 via Koch Records. Recording sessions took place at House Of Hits in New York and at Westlake Recording Studios in Los Angeles. Production was handled by Marley Marl himself, except for one track produced with 88 Fingers. It features guest appearances from Blaq Poet, Busy Bee Starski and Magic Juan. The album's title is a response to Nas's 2006 album Hip Hop Is Dead.

The album peaked at No. 140 on the Billboard 200, No. 23 on the Top R&B/Hip-Hop Albums, No. 8 on the Top Rap Albums and No. 15 on the Independent Albums in the United States.

A music video was released for promotional single "Hip Hop Lives (I Come Back)".

== Conception ==
"It all happened with one phone call", Marley Marl told AllHipHop during a March 2006 interview, "They called me and he jumped on the phone and told me it would be spectacular for hip hop… My reason for doing this is to show these kids that hip hop beefs are not that serious". The album marks the end of The Bridge Wars.

== Track listing ==
No.	Title	Writer(s)	Producer(s)	Length
1.	"It's Alive" (Intro)	Lawrence Parker; Marlon Williams	Marley Marl	0:40
2.	"Hip Hop Lives"	Parker; Williams	Marley Marl	2:52
3.	"Nothing New"	Parker; Williams	Marley Marl	3:16
4.	"I Was There"	Parker; Williams	Marley Marl	3:47
5.	"Musika" (featuring Magic Juan)	Parker; John G. Wilson; Williams	Marley Marl	4:05
6.	"Rising to the Top"	Parker; Williams	Marley Marl	3:29
7.	"Over 30"	Parker; Williams	Marley Marl	3:52
8.	"M.A.R.L.E.Y. (Marley and Red Living Everyday Youthfully)"	Parker; Williams	Marley Marl	1:30
9.	"Kill a Rapper"	Parker; Williams	Marley Marl	2:56
10.	"The Teacha's Back"	Parker; Williams	Marley Marl	3:41
11.	"The Victory" (featuring Blaq Poet)	Parker; Wilbur Bass; Williams	Marley Marl	3:48
12.	"This Is What It Is"	Parker; Williams	Marley Marl; 88-Fingers	3:52
13.	"All Skool"	Parker; Williams	Marley Marl	4:05
14.	"House of Hits" (featuring Chief Rocker Busy Bee)	Parker; Williams	Marley Marl	4:31
Total length:				46:24

Exclusive Circuit City Bonus Tracks
No.	Title	Producer(s)	Length
15.	"Intro"
16.	"Stop the Violence (Part 2)" (featuring Peedo)	KRS-One; QF
17.	"Strictly Hip Hop"	KRS-One; Billy Brimstone
18.	"The Most Dangerous Emcee"	KRS-One; QF

== Personnel ==
- Lawrence "KRS-One" Parker – lyrics & vocals
- John "Magic Juan" Wilson – lyrics & vocals (track 5)
- Wilbur "Blaq Poet" Bass – lyrics & vocals (track 11)
- David "Busy Bee" Parker – vocals (track 14)
- Frederick "Red Alert" Crute – additional vocals (track 8)
- Chris "DJ Premier" Martin – scratches (track 11)
- Marlon "Marley Marl" Williams – producer, recording, mixing, A&R, co-executive producer
- 88-Fingers – producer (track 12)
- Ivan Chevere – recording, mixing
- Harold English – additional recording and mixing
- Kevin "K-Def" Hansford – re-mixing (track 10)
- Drew Lavyne – mastering
- Simone G. Parker – executive producer, A&R, management
- Rick Martin – co-executive producer, A&R, management
- Leonardo Harris – art direction, design
- Laura Grier – photography
- Alyson Abbagnaro – A&R
- Marleny Dominguez – A&R, management
- Paul Grosso – creative director
- Christian Mariano – product manager

== Charts ==
Chart (2007)	Peak position
US Billboard 200	140
US Top R&B/Hip-Hop Albums (Billboard)	23
US Top Rap Albums (Billboard)	8
US Independent Albums (Billboard)	15
