= Maximum Strength =

Studio album by KRS-One
- Released: June 10, 2008
- Recorded: January–May 2008
- Genre: Hip-hop
- Length: 33:07
- Label: Koch Records
- Producers: Simone Parker (exec.); Dirt; Duane "DaRock" Ramos; James "Desi" Desmond; Oh No; Ser Kenoe

KRS-One chronology
Adventures in Emceein (2008)	Maximum Strength (2008)	Survival Skills (2009)

Professional ratings
Review scores
Source	Rating
AllMusic	4/5 stars
PopMatters	6/10
RapReviews	8/10

Maximum Strength is the tenth solo studio album by American rapper KRS-One. It was released on June 10, 2008, via Koch Records. Production was handled by Duane "DaRock" Ramos, James Desmond, Dirt, Oh No and Ser Kenoe, with Simone Parker serving as executive producer. The name Maximum Strength was originally the title for an album recorded by KRS-One in 1998-1999 for Jive Records that still remains unreleased. When promoting this album in 2008 it was said to finally be a release of the shelved LP and the label even posted track lists and cover very different from the final release.

The album peaked at number 78 on the Billboard Top R&B/Hip-Hop Albums in the US.

== Track listing ==
All lyrics are written by Lawrence Parker.

No.	Title	Producer(s)	Length
1.	"Beware"	Duane "Da Rock" Ramos	3:46
2.	"Pick It Up"	Duane "Da Rock" Ramos; James Desmond	3:41
3.	"All My Men"	Duane "Da Rock" Ramos; Ser Kenoe	2:46
4.	"Straight Through"	Dirt	3:12
5.	"Rockin' Til the Morning"	Duane "Da Rock" Ramos; James Desmond	3:10
6.	"The Kool Herc"	Oh No	1:06
7.	"Busy Bee Shout Out"		0:15
8.	"New York"	Duane "Da Rock" Ramos	3:26
9.	"Hip Hop"	Duane "Da Rock" Ramos	3:29
10.	"Let Me Know"	Duane "Da Rock" Ramos	2:31
11.	"Nah"	Duane "Da Rock" Ramos	3:37
12.	"The Heat"	Duane "Da Rock" Ramos	2:08
Total length:			33:07

== Personnel ==
- Lawrence "KRS-One" Parker – lyrics, vocals
- Duane Ramos – producer (tracks: 1–3, 5, 8–12)
- James Desmond – producer (tracks: 2, 5)
- Ser Kenoe – producer (track 3)
- Dirt – producer (track 4)
- Michael "Oh No" Jackson – producer (track 6)
- Arnold Mischkulnig – mixing, mastering
- Bob Perry – mixing, mastering
- Simone G. Parker – executive producer
- Andrew Kelley – art direction, design
- Scott "DJ Scott La Rock" Sterling – overseen by

== Charts ==
Chart (2008)	Peak position
US Top R&B/Hip-Hop Albums (Billboard)	78
