= PE 2.0 =

- Also known as: Project Experience 2.0
- Origin: Long Island, New York, Oakland, California U.S.
- Genres: Hip hop
- Years active: 2014–present
- Label: Spit Digital
- Spinoff of: Public Enemy
- Members: Jahi
- Website: 2-0pe.com

PE 2.0 is the spiritual successor and "next generation" of iconic New York rap group Public Enemy, fronted by Oakland rapper Jahi. Originally from Cleveland, Jahi had met Public Enemy frontman Chuck D backstage during a sound-check at the 1999 Rock & Roll Hall of Fame and later appeared as a support act on Public Enemy's 20th Anniversary Tour in 2007.

Jahi states the task of PE 2.0 is to "take select songs from the PE catalog and cover or revisit them", as well as new material with members of the original Public Enemy including DJ Lord, Davy DMX, Professor Griff and Chuck D.

PE 2.0's first album "People Get Ready" was released on October 7, 2014.

"InsPirEd" PE 2.0's second album and part two of a proposed trilogy was released October 11, 2015.

== Discography ==
- 2014: People Get Ready
- 2015: InsPirEd
