= Spiritual Minded =

Studio album by KRS-One
- Released: January 22, 2002
- Recorded: June–October 2001
- Studio: Slammin' Studios
- Genre: Christian hip hop
- Length: 69:34
- Label: Koch
- Producer: Simone Parker (exec.); BB Jay; Bervin Harris; Calvin Tibbs; Chase; Cookies & Cream; Darren Quinlan; DJ Tiné Tim; Domingo; Douglas Jones; G. Simone; KRS-One; Terry A.

KRS-One chronology
Best of B-Boy Records (2001)	Spiritual Minded (2002)	The Mix Tape (2002)

Professional ratings
Review scores
Source	Rating
AllMusic	3/5 stars
HipHopDX	4/5
laut.de	3/5 stars
RapReviews	8/10
The New Rolling Stone Album Guide	2.5/5 stars
The Source	3.5/5 stars

Spiritual Minded is the fifth solo studio album by American rapper and record producer KRS-One. It was released on January 22, 2002, through Koch Records. Recording sessions took place at Slammin' Studios. Production was handled by BB Jay, Bervin Harris, Calvin Tibbs, Chase, Cookies & Cream, Darren Quinlan, DJ Tiné Tim, Domingo, Douglas Jones, G. Simone, Terry A., and KRS-One himself. It features guest appearances from B.B. Jay, Fat Joe, Rampage, Rha Goddess, Smooth B. and T-Bone.

KRS-One's spiritual lyrical content came as a surprise to fans and critics, as he had previously written songs critical of Christianity and organized religion.

== Track listing ==
No.	Title	Writer(s)	Producer(s)	Length
1.	"Opening"	Lawrence Parker	Bervin Harris	1:27
2.	"Lord Live Within My Heart"	Parker; G. Simone	KRS-One	3:23
3.	"Take Your Tyme"	Parker; Simone	Cookies & Cream	3:15
4.	"Take It to God"	Parker; Professor Ecks; Ron	KRS-One	4:07
5.	"Good Bye" (featuring G. Simone and Tawatha Agee)	Parker	Douglas Jones; G. Simone	3:31
6.	"South Bronx 2002" (featuring 11/13, Professor Ecks and Reality)	Parker	KRS-One	4:27
7.	"Never Give Up"	Parker	Domingo	3:17
8.	"T Bone Speaks"			0:32
9.	"Tears"	Parker	DJ Tiné Tim; Terry A.	5:46
10.	"The Struggle Continues (Choose Your Way)" (featuring T-Bone)	Parker; Rene Sotomayor	Chase	5:47
11.	"The Conscious Rapper"	Parker; Terry Aundriel	KRS-One	4:12
12.	"T Bone Speaks Again"			0:21
13.	"Trust"	Parker; Aundriel	DJ Tiné Tim	2:57
14.	"Come to the Temple" (featuring Smooth B., Rampage, Rah Goddess and Fat Joe)	Parker; Darryl Barnes; Roger McNair; Rhamelle Greene; Joseph Cartagena	DJ Tiné Tim; Terry A.	4:17
15.	"Ain't Ready"	Parker	KRS-One	4:02
16.	"God Is Spirit" (featuring BB Jay)	Parker	BB Jay; Darren Quinlan	4:12
17.	"Know Thyself" (featuring 11/13)	Parker	Domingo	5:07
18.	"G. Simone Speaks"			0:31
19.	"Dayz Ahead"	Parker	KRS-One	3:40
20.	"Power"	Parker; Calvin Tibbs	Calvin Tibbs	4:43
Total length:				69:34

Japanese edition bonus track
No.	Title	Writer(s)	Length
21.	"Get Yourself Up" (Pete Rock Remix)	Parker

== Charts ==
Chart (2002)	Peak position
US Independent Albums (Billboard)	10
US Top Gospel Albums (Billboard)	4
US Top R&B/Hip-Hop Albums (Billboard)	64
