= Ms. Melodie =

American MC (1969–2012)

- Ms Melodie and KRS One in 1988

Background information
- Born: Ramona Scott; March 21, 1969
- Origin: Brooklyn, New York City, U.S.
- Died: July 17, 2012 (aged 43)
- Genre: Hip hop
- Occupation: MC
- Years active: 1988–1992
- Labels: Jive; RCA
- Formerly of: Boogie Down Productions

Ms. Melodie, the stage name of Ramona Parker (née Scott; March 21, 1969 – July 17, 2012), was an American MC. She was associated with KRS-One's group Boogie Down Productions (BDP) and was for a time married to KRS-One. She was described by Vibe as "one of the ladies who could sonically spar with the fellas, spit raw lyrics, rhyme from a female's perspective, and hold their own."

== Career ==
Scott participated in the 1989 "Self Destruction" piece created by the Stop the Violence Movement. AllMusic said that her single, "Hype According to Ms. Melodie", featured an "aggressive style" and was "excellent". Ms. Melodie and the rest of BDP appeared in the Keenen Ivory Wayans film I'm Gonna Git You Sucka. Her only album, Diva, was released the following year by Jive/RCA Records and was largely produced by KRS-One, with contributions from Sam Sever and the Awesome 2's DJ Teddy Tedd. The single "Wake Up, Wake Up" reached the Top 20 of Billboard's Hot Rap Singles chart; the music video to its follow-up single "Live on Stage" was a hit on video stations. She appeared in the music video for Queen Latifah's single "Ladies First".

== Personal life ==
Scott was raised in the Flatbush section of the New York City borough of Brooklyn. She was the younger sister of former BDP member Harmony (Harmony, born Pamela (Scott) Pettway went on to sing gospel as a lead vocalist for Brooklyn Tabernacle Choir - winning six Grammy awards, the most of any gospel choir). She was married to KRS-One from 1987 to 1992. She had two sons. It has not been confirmed that these sons were fathered by KRS-One.

Scott died on July 17, 2012, at the age of 43 due to complications from an undisclosed illness.

== Discography ==
- Diva (1989)
