= Ghetto Music: The Blueprint of Hip Hop =

Studio album by Boogie Down Productions
- Released: July 4, 1989
- Recorded: 1988–1989
- Studios: Power Play Studios (New York, NY)
- Genres: East Coast hip-hop; political hip-hop
- Length: 49:33
- Label: Jive
- Producer: KRS-One

Boogie Down Productions chronology
By All Means Necessary (1988)	Ghetto Music: The Blueprint of Hip Hop (1989)	Edutainment (1990)

Singles from Ghetto Music: The Blueprint of Hip Hop
- 1. "Jack of Spades" Released: June 1989; 2. "Why Is That?" Released: August 1989; 3. "You Must Learn" Released: November 1989

Professional ratings
Review scores
Source	Rating
AllMusic	4.5/5 stars
Christgau's Record Guide	B+
Los Angeles Times	3.5/5 stars
The New York Times	(favorable)
Rolling Stone	4/5 stars
Trouser Press	(favorable)
The Washington Post	(favorable)

Ghetto Music: The Blueprint of Hip Hop is the third studio album by American hip-hop group Boogie Down Productions. It was released on July 4, 1989, via Jive Records. Recording sessions took place at Power Play Studios in New York. Production was handled by member KRS-One with co-production from fellow member D-Nice, D-Square, Rebekah Foster, Sidney Mills and Spaceman Patterson.

The album peaked at number 36 on the Billboard 200 and number 7 on the Top R&B/Hip-Hop Albums chart in the United States. On September 25, 1989, it was certified Gold by the Recording Industry Association of America for selling 500,000 copies in the US.

The album featured three singles: "Jack of Spades", "Why Is That?" and "You Must Learn", which were later included in KRS-One's 2000 compilation album A Retrospective.

== Track listing ==
All tracks are written by Lawrence Parker, except track 5 written with Pamela Scott.

No.	Title	Length
1.	"The Style You Haven't Done Yet"	3:01
2.	"Why Is That?"	3:57
3.	"The Blueprint"	2:54
4.	"Jack of Spades"	4:49
5.	"Jah Rulez"	4:25
6.	"Breath Control"	3:38
7.	"Who Protects Us from You?"	2:25
8.	"You Must Learn"	3:51
9.	"Hip Hop Rules"	4:08
10.	"Bo! Bo! Bo!"	5:21
11.	"Gimme, Dat, (Woy)"	3:04
12.	"Ghetto Music"	3:15
13.	"World Peace"	4:45
Total length:		49:33

== Personnel ==
- Lawrence "KRS-One" Parker – lead vocals, songwriter, producer, mixing
- Derrick "D-Nice" Jones – beatbox (track 6), co-producer
- Kevin Batchelor – backing vocals, trumpet
- Pamela "Harmony" Scott – backing vocals, songwriter (track 5)
- Shelia Pate – backing vocals
- Sidney Mills – keyboards, co-producer
- Val Douglas – bass
- Anastas "Nass-T" Hackett – drums
- Jerry Johnson – saxophone
- Nathaniel "Afrika Baby Bam" Hall – scratches (track 5)
- Dwayne "D-Square" Sumal – co-producer, engineering, editing
- Rebekah Foster – co-producer, engineering
- William "Spaceman" Patterson – co-producer
- Peter Bodtke – photography
- Scott "DJ Scott La Rock" Sterling – overseen by

== Charts ==
Chart (1989)	Peak position
US Billboard 200	36
US Top R&B/Hip-Hop Albums (Billboard)	7

=== Singles ===
Year	Song	Chart positions		
Year	Song	US Rap	US R&B	US Dance
1989	"Jack of Spades"	3	—	15
1989	"Why Is That?"	5	48	20
1989	"You Must Learn"	15	—	—

== Certifications ==
Region	Certification	Certified units/sales
United States (RIAA)	Gold	500,000^{^}
^{^} Shipments figures based on certification alone.
