= Edutainment (album) =

Studio album by Boogie Down Productions
- Released: July 17, 1990
- Recorded: 1989–1990
- Genres: East Coast hip-hop; political hip-hop; golden age hip-hop
- Length: 69:57
- Labels: Jive; RCA, 1358-J
- Producers: KRS-One; D-Nice; Pal Joey

Boogie Down Productions chronology
| Ghetto Music: The Blueprint of Hip Hop (1989) | Edutainment (1990) | Live Hardcore Worldwide (1991) |

Singles from Edutainment
- 1. "Love's Gonna Get'cha (Material Love)" Released: July 5, 1990; 2. "Ya Know the Rules" Released: September 6, 1990

Professional ratings
Review scores
| Source | Rating |
|---|---|
| AllMusic | 3/5 stars |
| Robert Christgau | (3-star Honorable Mention) |
| Entertainment Weekly | B+ |
| Los Angeles Times | 3.5/5 stars |
| Rolling Stone | 3/5 stars |
| Select | 5/5 medals |
| The Source | 5/5 |
| Spin | (favorable) |
| Trouser Press | (favorable) |

Edutainment is the fourth album from hip-hop group Boogie Down Productions. Released on July 17, 1990, it is an album whose lyrics deal with afrocentricity and socio-political knowledge. It has 6 skits/interludes known as "exhibits" that all talk about or relate to Black people. Many skits feature Kwame Ture (né Stokely Carmichael) a leader of the U.S. civil rights movement and Black power movement. The album was certified Gold by the RIAA on October 10, 1990. KRS One has stated in interviews that the album has sold over 700,000 copies

== Track listing ==
| # | Title | Producer(s) | Performer (s) |
|---|---|---|---|
| 1 | "Exhibit A" | KRS-One | *Interlude* |
| 2 | "Blackman in Effect" | KRS-One; D-Nice | KRS-One |
| 3 | "Ya Know the Rules" | KRS-One | KRS-One; D-Nice |
| 4 | "Exhibit B" | KRS-One | *Interlude* |
| 5 | "Beef" | KRS-One | KRS-One |
| 6 | "House Nigga's" | KRS-One | KRS-One |
| 7 | "Exhibit C" | KRS-One | *Interlude* |
| 8 | "Love's Gonna Get'cha (Material Love)" | Pal Joey | KRS-One |
| 9 | "100 Guns" | KRS-One | KRS-One |
| 10 | "Ya Strugglin'" | D-Nice; KRS-One | KRS-One; Kwame Toure |
| 11 | "Breath Control II" | KRS-One | KRS-One |
| 12 | "Exhibit D" | KRS-One | *Interlude* |
| 13 | "Edutainment" | KRS-One | KRS-One |
| 14 | "The Homeless" | KRS-One | KRS-One |
| 15 | "Exhibit E" | KRS-One | *Interlude* |
| 16 | "The Kenny Parker Show" | KRS-One | KRS-One |
| 17 | "Original Lyrics" | KRS-One | KRS-One; Special K |
| 18 | "The Racist" | KRS-One | KRS-One |
| 19 | "7 Dee Jays" | Decadent Dub Team; KRS-One; Sidney Mills | KRS-One; D-Nice; Heather B.; Jamal-Ski; Ms. Melodie; Harmony; D-Square |
| 20 | "30 Cops or More" | Decadent Dub Team; KRS-One; Sidney Mills | KRS-One |
| 21 | "Exhibit F" | KRS-One | *Interlude* |

=== Instrumental credits ===
"100 Guns"

- Keyboards: Sidney Mills

== Charts ==
| Chart (1990) | Peak position |
|---|---|
| US Billboard 200 | 32 |
| US Top R&B/Hip-Hop Albums (Billboard) | 9 |

== Certifications ==
| Region | Certification | Certified units/sales |
|---|---|---|
| United States (RIAA) | Gold | 500,000^{^} |
^{^} Shipments figures based on certification alone.

== Later samples ==
- "100 Guns"
  - "Kingdom Come" by Jay-Z from the album Kingdom Come
  - "New York" by Ja Rule featuring Fat Joe & Jadakiss from the album R.U.L.E.
- "Love's Gonna Get'cha (Material Love)" contains samples from Pat Metheny Group's song "Spring Ain't Here" from the album Letter from Home and Jocelyn Brown's song "Love's Gonna Get You" from the album One from the Heart
  - "The Day the Niggaz Took Over" by Dr. Dre featuring Dat Nigga Daz, RBX & Snoop Dogg from the album The Chronic
  - "Growin' Up in the Hood" by Compton's Most Wanted from the album Straight Checkn 'Em
  - "I Shot the Sheriff" by Warren G from the album Take a Look Over Your Shoulder
  - "Handle the Vibe" by Bone Thugs-n-Harmony from the album The Art of War
  - "I Don't Need Love" by Evidence from the album Cats & Dogs
- "Beef"
  - "SlaughtaHouse" by Masta Ace Incorporated from the album Slaughtahouse
- "Blackman in Effect"
  - "Judge Not" by LPG featuring Pigeon John from the album The Earthworm
  - "Open Your Eyes" by Immortal Technique from the album The 3rd World
  - "Talking in My Sleep" by Elzhi from the album The Preface
- "Breath Control II"
  - "They Want EFX" by Das EFX from the album Dead Serious
- "House Nigga's"
  - "Uncle Tom Artist" by Smokin' Suckaz wit Logic from the album Playin' Foolz
- "Original Lyrics"
  - "East Coast" by Das EFX from the album Dead Serious
  - "East Coast Funk" by Daddy-O from the album You Can be A Daddy, But Never Daddy-O
- "30 Cops Or More" contains samples from Melvin Van Peebles' 1971 Movie Sweet Sweetback's Baadasssss Song
