= Mad Lion =

Jamaican musician

- Born: Oswald Priest; London, England
- Origin: Brooklyn, New York City, U.S.
- Genres: Hip hop; dancehall; reggae
- Occupations: reggae/ragga musician; rapper; record producer; DJ
- Instruments: Rapping; keyboards; turntables; sampler
- Labels: Nervous Records; Warner Bros. Records
- Formerly of: Boogie Down Productions

Oswald Priest, better known as Mad Lion, is a dancehall, ragga musician and rapper. He frequently collaborates with fellow hip hop artist KRS-One. His awards include the 1994 Source Award as Reggae Artist of the Year, and the 1995 Source Award as Reggae Hip-Hop Artist of the Year.

== Biography ==
Priest is Jamaican and was born in London. Shortly after moving to Brooklyn, New York, he met reggae performer Super Cat at Super Power Records. At Super Cat's suggestion, he adopted his professional name, an acronym for Musical Assassin Delivering Lyrical Intelligence Over Nations. He blended reggae and hip-hop, and went on to work with KRS-One throughout the 1990s. His addition of hip hop rhythms to Shabba Ranks' "Jam" gave him some early success. His début single "Shoot to Kill" was successful in New York and he reached a wider audience with "Take It Easy", which was one of 18 tracks on his début album in 1994, titled Real Ting. He contributed to Salt-N-Pepa's 1997 album Brand New. In 1997 he topped the US reggae chart with "Carpenter".

He also appeared in the music video for the Flava in Ya Ear remix by Craig Mack feat. Notorious B.I.G., Rampage, LL Cool J and Busta Rhymes.

Mad Lion's other collaborative projects consist of working with Puerto Rican producers DJ Playero, DJ Tony Touch, DJ Nico Canada, and other reggaeton artists who were flourishing around 1996. Mad Lion was featured on a track in which he did a duet with the Puerto Rican Hip Hop artist Mexicano 777 on the track titled "Guerreros" which was a Dancehall fused Hip-Hop track that was featured on the "Boricua Guerrero: First Combat" album produced by DJ Playero & DJ Nico Canada. Mad Lion also collaborated with Puerto Rican Reggaeton artist Rey Pirin on the track titled "Guerrillero Borincano" which was a gritty Hip-Hop. Mad Lion was joined by Jahdan & the Black Hearted Skavengerz who did a solo on a Reggaeton riddim titled "Many Many More", & the duo Curly Valentino & Demos Demarco made an appearance on the Hip-Hop track titled "Razor Sharp" with Mexicano 777. Mad Lion soon lent his rapping skills to that of the DJ Tony Touch & DJ Nico Canada produced mixtape titled "Guatauba", where he laid down a freestyle on a Reggaeton riddim. Again, Mad Lion was joined by other Jamaican Dancehall artists such as Mad Cobra, who did a freestyle on a Hip-Hop riddim, & The Black Hearted Skavengerz appeared doing a freestyle on a reggaeton riddim.

== Discography ==
- Real Ting (1994), Nervous
- Real Lover (1995), VP
- Ghetto Gold and Platinum Respect (1997), Nervous
- Predatah or Prey (2001), Reprise/Warner Bros. Records
