= Return of the Boom Bap =

Studio album by KRS-One
- Released: September 28, 1993
- Recorded: February–June 1993
- Studios: D&D (New York, NY); Battery Studios (New York, NY)
- Genres: Boom bap; hardcore hip-hop
- Length: 55:47
- Label: Jive
- Producers: DJ Premier; Kid Capri; KRS-One; Norty Cotto; Showbiz

KRS-One chronology
Sex and Violence (1992)	Return of the Boom Bap (1993)	KRS-One (1995)

Singles from Return of the Boom Bap
- 1. "Outta Here" Released: September 3, 1993; 2. "Sound of da Police" Released: December 6, 1993

Return of the Boom Bap is the debut solo studio album by American rapper KRS-One, released on September 28, 1993, by Jive Records. The recording sessions took place at D&D Studios and at Battery Studios, in New York. The album was produced by DJ Premier, Kid Capri, Norty Cotto, Showbiz, and KRS-One. It features guest appearances from Ill Will and Kid Capri. The album peaked at number 37 on the Billboard 200 and number 5 on the Top R&B/Hip-Hop Albums in the United States.

The album produced two singles: "Outta Here" and "Sound of da Police". The latter reached number 89 on the US Billboard Hot 100. The track "P Is Still Free" appeared on the Menace II Society (The Original Motion Picture Soundtrack) labeled as a B.D.P. track. The track "Black Cop" was originally released as a 12" single and a track for the CB4 (Original Motion Picture Soundtrack), thus also labeled as a B.D.P. track.

In 1998, the album was selected as one of The Source's "100 Best Rap Albums". According to KRS-One, the album has sold over 300,000 copies.

== Critical reception ==
Professional ratings
Review scores
Source	Rating
AllMusic	3/5 stars
Chicago Tribune	3.5/4 stars
Entertainment Weekly	B+
NME	8/10
Q	3/5 stars
Rolling Stone	4/5 stars
The Rolling Stone Album Guide	3/5 stars
The Source	4/5 stars
Spin Alternative Record Guide	8/10
The Village Voice	A−

Robert Christgau, in The Village Voice, called the album "his best, because the music has finally subsumed the lyrics—with outside guidance from Gang Starr's DJ Premier and others, the rapmaster's bassy beats and monophonic hooks have never sounded more catchy or more his own... Horn blats, 'Three Blind Mice' guitar, siren imitation, human beat-box, whatever—all recur hypnotically and leave you hungry for more. Nor have the words fallen off. The history he teaches is mostly his own. And a couple of times he just kills the cops."

== Track listing ==
No.	Title	Writer(s)	Producer(s)	Length
1.	"KRS-ONE Attacks"	Lawrence Parker; Chris Martin	DJ Premier	2:50
2.	"Outta Here"	Parker; Martin	DJ Premier	4:28
3.	"Black Cop"	Parker	KRS-One	2:59
4.	"Mortal Thought"	Parker; Martin	DJ Premier	3:19
5.	"I Can't Wake Up"	Parker; Martin	KRS-One; DJ Premier	3:34
6.	"Slap Them Up" (featuring Ill Will)	Parker; William Broady; Norberto Cotto; Douglas Jones	Norty Cotto; Douglas Jones (co.)	3:58
7.	"Sound of da Police"	Parker; Rodney Lemay; Eric Burdon; Bryan James Chandler; Alan Lomax	Showbiz	4:18
8.	"Mad Crew"	Parker	KRS-One	4:24
9.	"Uh Oh"	Parker; Karen Christina Chin; Wycliffe Johnson; Cleveland Browne	KRS-One	4:05
10.	"Brown Skin Woman"	Parker; David Anthony Love	Kid Capri	4:38
11.	"Return of the Boom Bap"	Parker	KRS-One	3:46
12.	""P" Is Still Free"	Parker; Martin	DJ Premier	4:56
13.	"Stop Frontin'" (featuring Kid Capri)	Parker; Love; Henry Bernier; Nat Simon; Frederick Russell Jones	Kid Capri	3:19
14.	"Higher Level"	Parker; Martin; Eugene Edgar Page	DJ Premier	5:13
Total length:				55:47

Sample credits

- Track 7 contains a sample of "Inside-Looking Out" written by Eric Burdon, Chas Chandler and Alan Lomax and performed by Grand Funk Railroad
- Track 9 contains a sample of "Kill the Bitch" written by Karen Christina Chin, Wycliffe Johnson and Cleveland Browne and performed by Sasha
- Track 13 contains a sample of "Poinciana" written by Buddy Bernier, Nat Simon and Frederick Russell Jones and performed by Ahmad Jamal
- Track 14 contains a sample of "Blacula" written and performed by Gene Page

== Charts ==
=== Album chart positions ===
Chart (1993)	Peak position
US Billboard 200	37
US Top R&B/Hip-Hop Albums (Billboard)	5

=== Singles chart positions ===
Year	Song	Chart positions			
Year	Song	Billboard Hot 100	Hot R&B/Hip-Hop Singles & Tracks	Hot Rap Singles	Hot Dance Music/Maxi-Singles Sales
1993	"Outta Here"	–	61	5	10
1993	"Sound of da Police"	89	79	17	6
