= By All Means Necessary =

Studio album by Boogie Down Productions
- Released: April 12, 1988
- Recorded: September 1987 – March 1988
- Genres: Hip-hop; political hip-hop; conscious hip-hop
- Length: 47:28
- Labels: Jive; RCA
- Producer: KRS-One

Boogie Down Productions chronology
Man & His Music (Remixes from Around the World) (1987)	By All Means Necessary (1988)	Ghetto Music: The Blueprint of Hip Hop (1989)

Singles from By All Means Necessary
- 1. "Stop the Violence" Released: March 1988; 2. "My Philosophy" Released: May 1988

By All Means Necessary is the second studio album by American hip-hop group Boogie Down Productions, released on April 12, 1988, by Jive Records. After the 1987 murder of DJ-producer Scott La Rock, MC KRS-One moved away from the violent themes that dominated Boogie Down Productions's debut album, Criminal Minded, and began writing socially conscious songs using the moniker the Teacher.

== Album information ==
Accompanied by minimalist production and hard-hitting drum beats, KRS-One covers social issues that include government and police corruption, safe sex, government involvement in the drug trade, and violence in the hip hop community.

The album's cover art and title both make reference to Malcolm X. The cover, depicting KRS-One, references an iconic photograph of Malcolm X peering through a window while holding an M1 carbine rifle, and the title is a modification of Malcolm X's famous phrase "by any means necessary".

As of September 25, 1989, the album was certified gold in sales by the Recording Industry Association of America.

== Reception ==
Professional ratings
Review scores
Source	Rating
AllMusic	5/5 stars
NME	9.9/10
The Philadelphia Inquirer	4/4 stars
RapReviews	9.5/10
Record Mirror	5/5
Rolling Stone	3/5 stars
The Rolling Stone Album Guide	4.5/5 stars
The Source	5/5 stars
Spin Alternative Record Guide	8/10
The Village Voice	B+

The album is widely seen as one of, if not the first, politically conscious efforts in hip-hop. AllMusic critic Steve Huey described the album as a landmark of political hip-hop that's unfairly lost in the shadow of Public Enemy's It Takes a Nation of Millions to Hold Us Back. Anthony DeCurtis of Rolling Stone praised its social commentary and wrote, "Over irresistible beats provided by his BDP cohorts, KRS delivers the word on the drug trade, AIDS and violence—three forces that threaten to destroy minority communities."

In 1998, By All Means Necessary was included in The Source's "100 Best Albums" list.

In 2008, the single "My Philosophy" was ranked number 49 on VH1's 100 Greatest Songs of Hip Hop.

== Track listing ==
- All songs were written, produced and performed by KRS-One.

No.	Title	Length
1.	"My Philosophy"	5:41
2.	"Ya Slippin'"	4:56
3.	"Stop the Violence"	4:42
4.	"Illegal Business"	5:22
5.	"Nervous"	4:13
6.	"I'm Still #1"	5:13
7.	"Part Time Suckers"	5:32
8.	"Jimmy"	4:16
9.	"T'Cha-T'Cha"	4:35
10.	"Necessary"	2:57

== Samples used ==
- "My Philosophy" contains a sample from the Stanley Turrentine song "Sister Sanctified".
- "Ya Slippin'" contains an interpolation of the Deep Purple song "Smoke on the Water" and has the beat from "Poetry" from BDP's Criminal Minded.
- "Stop the Violence" contains the riddim from the Courtney Melody recording "This Sound a Dem Trouble".
- "Illegal Business" contains samples from the Fat Albert and the Cosby Kids recording "Creativity" and the Jefferson Starship recording "Rock Music".
- "Nervous" contains samples from the Rhythm Heritage recording "Sky's the Limit" and the War recording "Galaxy".
- "I'm Still #1" contains a sample from the All the People (featuring Robert Moore) recording "Cramp Your Style".
- "Part-Time Suckers" contains samples from the Smokey Robinson & the Miracles recording "Mickey's Monkey" and interpolation from Stevie Wonder's song "Part-Time Lover".
- "Jimmy" contains the basic rhythm from the Wings song "Let 'Em In" and a sample from the Sequence song "Funk You Up."

== Charts ==
Album

Chart (1988)	Peak position
US Billboard 200	75
US Top R&B/Hip-Hop Albums (Billboard)	18

Singles

Year	Song	Chart positions
Year	Song	US R&B Singles
1988	"Stop the Violence"	76

== Certifications ==
Region	Certification	Certified units/sales
United States (RIAA)	Gold	500,000^{^}
^{^} Shipments figures based on certification alone.
