= Sound of da Police =

Single by KRS-One

from the album Return of the Boom Bap
- B-side: "Hip Hop vs. Rap"
- Released: December 6, 1993
- Recorded: 1993
- Studio: D&D Studios (New York, NY)
- Genre: Boom bap; conscious hip hop
- Length: 4:18
- Label: Jive
- Songwriters: Lawrence Parker; Rodney Lemay; Eric Burdon; Chas Chandler; Alan Lomax
- Producer: Showbiz

KRS-One singles chronology
"Outta Here" (1993)	"Sound of da Police" (1993)	"MC's Act Like They Don't Know" (1995)

Music video
- "Sound of da Police" on YouTube

Professional ratings
Review scores
Source	Rating
AllMusic	4/5 stars

"Sound of da Police" is a song by American rapper KRS-One. Recorded at D&D Studios in New York City with production by Showbiz, it was released in December 1993 as the second and final single from KRS-One's debut solo studio album, Return of the Boom Bap (1993). It peaked at number 89 on the US Billboard Hot 100.

== Content ==
The song criticizes police brutality and systemic racism. It begins with KRS-One whooping twice to evoke a police siren (the "sound of the police"); this recurs several times throughout the song. The heavy bass sample loop, and part of a guitar solo were taken from Grand Funk Railroad's cover of "Inside-Looking Out", the final track of their LP Grand Funk. Part of the drum track is taken from "Sing a Simple Song" by Sly and the Family Stone.

The music video was directed by Michael Lucero.

== Charts ==
Chart (1994)	Peak position
US Billboard Hot 100	89
US Hot R&B/Hip-Hop Songs (Billboard)	79
US Hot Rap Songs (Billboard)	17
US Maxi-Singles Sales (Billboard)	6

== Certifications ==
Region	Certification	Certified units/sales
United Kingdom (BPI)	Silver	200,000^{‡}
^{‡} Sales+streaming figures based on certification alone.

== In popular culture ==
The song was featured in the American films Cop Out, Tag, Black and Blue, and the British film Attack the Block. It was featured as an in-game radio selection in the 2015 video game Battlefield Hardline (by Electronic Arts), and was used for the end credits of the 2016 movie Ride Along 2 and in the 2016 published The Angry Birds Movie soundtrack. It has appeared in the TV show Brooklyn Nine-Nine. The 'Whoop whoop, sound of da police' hook has been referenced by ska punk band Sonic Boom Six on their track "Piggy in the Middle", by Body Count on their song "Black Hoodie" and in metal band Skindred on the title track of their 2002 debut album Babylon. The song plays over the final scenes and closing credits of season 3, episode 2 of Sex Education. It is the theme music for the long-running stand-up show on BBC Radio 4, Alfie Moore - It's a Fair Cop.

The song is well known in France, where the chorus is commonly misinterpreted as "assassins de la police" (literally "police killers"). A remix of the song by DJ Cut Killer with Édith Piaf's "Non, je ne regrette rien" was featured in the soundtrack of the film La Haine. The hip hop duo Suprême NTM later sampled the chorus on their album Live.

On February 3, 2012, hacker group Anonymous defaced the Boston Police Department's web page, replacing it with an embedded version of KRS-One's "Sound of da Police" music video and a message criticizing the department's treatment of the Occupy Boston movement.
