= Jesse West =

American rapper (born 1967)

- Also known as: 3rd Eye; Dirty Apple Slim; Dirty Traxx
- Born: Jesse Williams III; December 4, 1967 (age 58)
- Origin: The Bronx, New York City, U.S.
- Genres: Hip hop
- Years active: 1989–present
- Labels: Motown; MCA
- Formerly of: The Hitmen

Jesse West (born December 4, 1967), also known as 3rd Eye, is an American record producer and rapper who served as a member of the Hitmen, the in-house production wing of Puff Daddy's Bad Boy Records.

== History ==
Born Jesse Williams III in South Bronx, New York, he was one of the first rappers signed to Motown Records and, in 1989, released the album "No Prisoners". He then went on to produce hit songs with many artists including GZA, Xzibit, Heavy D and KRS-One among others. One of Bad Boy Records' original "Hitmen", West recorded Biggie Smalls first demo as well as produced remixes for songs on Mary J. Blige's album, What's the 411?

As rapper 3rd Eye, it has been argued that Jesse West was the first rapper to use the term "bling" on Super Cat's 1993 hit "Dolly My Baby (Remix)" – a song that West produced and also featured Puff Daddy and a young Biggie Smalls in his recording debut.

Jesse West continues to create tracks and produce music for artists.

== Discography ==
Solo Albums

Year	Song/Album	Label
1989	No Prisoners	Motown
1997	360° (single)	Sure Shot Records
1998	24/7 (single feat. NINE)	Loud Records
1999	Planets	DeClic & Alpha Entertainment

Production Credits

Year	Song	Artist	Album/Label
1991	"Come Do Me"	GZA	Words From a Genius/ Cold Chillin' Records
1992	"Slow Down"; "Silky"; "A Bunch of Niggas"	Heavy D & The Boys	Blue Funk/ Uptown
1992	All of It (Phat Mix)	Artz & Kraftz	Non-album single/ Columbia
1993	"Reminisce (Bad Boy Remix)"	Mary J Blige	What's the 411 Remix/ Uptown
1993	"Ease Up" {co-produced by Lord Finesse}	3rd Eye & Group Home	Who's The Man (soundtrack)/ Uptown
1993	"Valley of the Skinz (Jes Wes Remix)"	Trendz of Culture	Non-album single/ Madd Sounds
1994	"What"; "You Know My Name"	Top Quality	Magnum Opus/ PMD Records
1994	"Jam Session"	Heavy D, Troo-Kula & Notorious B.I.G.	Jam Session/ MCA Records
1994	"No Shorts and No Sleep"	PMD, Top Quality, 3rd Eye & Zone 7	Shade Business/ PMD Records
1995	"Gimme the Boom"; "Hard Rock"	Mystidious Misfits	A Who Dat?/ Epic Records
1995	"Here I Go (Jesse West Remix)"	Mystikal	Non-album single/ Jive Records
1996	"Actual Facts"	Lord Finesse, Grand Puba, Large Professor & Sadat X	The Awakening/ Penalty Recordings
1996	"Exclusive Debut"	Ill Biskits	Chronicles of Two Losers/ Atlantic
1996	"Richman, Poorman"	Nine	Cloud 9/ Profile Records
1997	"Mouth of Madness Part II (The Warriors)"	Raw Breed	Blood Sweat & Tears/ Warner Bros. Records
1997	"Step Into a World"	KRS-One	I Got Next/ Jive Records
1998	"Thug Brothers"	Funkmaster Flex, Big Pun & N.O.R.E.	The Mix Tape Vol. 3/ Loud Records
1998	Show Me Love	Funkmaster Flex, 24/7	The Mix Tape Vol. 3/ Loud Records
1998	"What U See Is What U Get"	Xzibit	40 Dayz & 40 Nightz/ Loud Records
1998	"Mind Yours"	Paula Perry	Extra, Extra!/ Mad Sounds
2001	"Supreme Alphabet"	Positive K	Creative Control Records
2004	"Lyrical High"	3rd Eye & Zone 7	Hit Squad-Zero Tolerance/Boondox Records
2006	(entire album)	Beans 'N' Apples	Come Fuk Wit Us/GLOK
2008	"Get Up"	Diamond D	The Hugh Hef Chronicles
2010	(3 tracks)	Krs-One & Greenie	"It's All Good"/Azoos
2014	"Losing My Mind"	Pharoahe Monch	P.T.S.D. (Post Traumatic Stress Disorder)

Remixes

Year	Song	Artist(s)	Label
1993	"Dolly My Baby"	Super Cat w/ 3rd Eye, Puff Daddy, Biggie Smalls, Mary J. Blige	Columbia/SME Records
1993	"What's the 411"	Mary J. Blige	Uptown/MCA Records
1993	"Reminisce"	Mary J. Blige	Uptown/MCA Records

=== Other appearances ===
"Guest Appearances"

Year	Song	Artist(s)	Album	Label
2009	"How You Really Want It"	Busta Rhymes	Back on My B.S. (iTunes only)	Conglomerate, Universal Motown

== Sampling ==
- "For James" – James Brown "Funky Drummer", "Soul Power"
- "The Master" – Talking Heads "Once in a Lifetime", Grace Jones "Slave to the Rhythm"
- "I Saw You" – Jackson Five "My Little Baby"
