= KRS-One =

American rapper (born 1965)

- KRS-One in 2021

Background information
- Also known as: KRS; Teacha; The Blastmaster; Big Joe Krash; The Temple of Hip Hop
- Born: Lawrence Parker; August 20, 1965 (age 61); New York City, U.S.
- Origin: The Bronx, New York City, U.S.
- Genres: East Coast hip-hop; conscious rap; political hip-hop; hardcore hip-hop
- Occupations: Rapper; singer; lyricist; record producer
- Works: KRS-One discography
- Years active: 1984–present
- Labels: Jive; Duck Down; E1; Aftermath
- Formerly of: Boogie Down Productions

Lawrence Kris Parker (born August 20, 1965), known professionally as KRS-One (/ˌkeɪ ɑːr ɛs ˈwʌn/ (Note: A backronym of "Knowledge Reigns Supreme Over Nearly Everyone".)), is an American rapper from New York City.

Parker initially rose to prominence in the mid 1980s as a founding member of the hip-hop group Boogie Down Productions, which he formed alongside DJ Scott La Rock. Following the release of their debut album, Criminal Minded (1987), Scott was killed, leaving Parker to continue the group largely as a solo endeavor. During its early years, Boogie Down Productions earned widespread critical acclaim and numerous accolades and was seen as an innovator in conscious hip-hop. After Boogie Down Productions disbanded in the early 1990s, KRS-One embarked on a solo career, releasing his self-titled debut album in 1993. His third solo album, I Got Next (1997), featured his best-known single, "Step into a World (Rapture's Delight)". Although Parker has continued to release albums since, his later work has not achieved the same level of success as his earlier releases.

== Early life ==
Lawrence Kris Parker was born on August 20, 1965 in the neighborhood of Park Slope, in Brooklyn, New York. His mother, Jacqueline Jones, worked as a secretary, while his father, Sheffield Brown, a handyman of Caribbean descent, (Note: Sources disagree on where Parker's father was from. Transition and BlackPast.org state that he was from the island of Trinidad, while Knowledge Reigns Supreme: The Critical Pedagogy of Hip-Hop Artist KRS-ONE states that his father was from Barbados.) was deported when Parker was an infant. His younger brother, Kenny, was born in 1966. The family moved to Harlem in 1969, with his mother remarrying in 1970, first to John Parker, a Jamaican man who she "married for his name" and divorced a year later, before being married to Charles Headley, who she had a daughter with, for a few years. The Parker children attended elementary school in Harlem; their mother, with her master's degree in education, also taught them about theology and African culture.

Parker was introduced to hip-hop through his mother's collection of records, which included albums by the Treacherous Three and Grandmaster Flash. At the age of thirteen, he left school and became a truant, later leaving home due to his mother disapproving of his choices. During the day, he read on philosophy and religion at a library, and at night, he practiced rapping at the homeless shelters he stayed at. While staying there, he was dubbed "Krisna" by the residents due to his interest towards the Hare Krishna spirituality. He was also a graffiti artist, signing his name as KRS-ONE. At seventeen, Parker passed the General Educational Development tests. He ended up at the Franklin Avenue Armory Shelter, where he met a social worker named Scott Monroe Sterling, who had been working as a DJ under the stage name Scott La Rock.

== Music career ==
=== 1984–1986: Initial recordings, founding of Boogie Down Productions, and the Bridge Wars ===
In 1984, he and Scott La Rock, alongside Just-Ice and D-Nice, founded a rap group called Scott La Rock and the Celebrity Three. Through Zakia Records, they released an single, "Advance", that discussed the prevention of nuclear war. The group soon split due to internal conflicts, and in 1985, Scott La Rock and Parker, under the name 12:41, contributed to a single, "Success is the Word". (Note: Stylized as "$ucce$$ i$ the Word".) which was released by Sleeping Bag Records, Fresh Records, and Streetwave Records as the B-side to Just-Ice's "Put that Record Back On", but it didn't chart. After these failed attempts, Scott responded to an newspaper ad from Rock Candy Records and Filmworks looking for new musicians for their recently created division, B-Boy Records. In response, the two formed the group Boogie Down Productions, with D-Nice also serving a member of their crew. In 1986, they released their first single, "Crack Attack", under the label.

In late 1985, MC Shan, a member of the Juice Crew, a prominent hip-hop group based in Queens, released "The Bridge", a twelve-inch single which celebrated the Queensbridge projects where he, Marley Marl, and Roxanne Shanté grew up in. A few months later, Scott and Parker finished recording a demo cassette with early versions of "Elementary" and "Criminal Minded". An engineer at the studio where the tape was recorded passed the contents to Mr. Magic, a prominent DJ associated with the Juice Crew. Magic blew them off, dismissing the group as "wack". In response, Scott and Parker recorded "South Bronx", a diss track on MC Shan that traced hip-hop's roots back to the Bronx, also targeting Mr. Magic, Marley Marl, Queens, and the rest of the Juice Crew. The single would be played by Kool DJ Red Alert; the resulting feud, The Bridge Wars, was the first of its kind.

=== 1987–1992: Death of Scott La Rock, the Stop the Violence Movement, and later Boogie Down Productions albums ===
Taking advantage of the feud, Boogie Down Productions released their debut album, Criminal Minded, in early 1987. It sold around 300,000 copies in its first year of release, peaked at Number 73 on the Top Black Albums chart, and is considered by hip-hop scholars as a classic gangsta rap album. Rock Candy was an unreliable business partner, allegedly paying the group minimal royalties by obfuscating the total amount of record sales, prompting the two, in 1987, to begin leaving B-Boy for Warner Records, with Benny Medina, Warner's A&R head, flying the group out to Los Angeles to negotiate a deal. Parker and Scott returned to New York several days later to announce their move, beginning pre-production of several tracks on an album that later became By All Means Necessary. However, Scott was shot and killed on August 27 as he attempted to intervene in a dispute involving D-Nice, forcing Parker to retool the group with his brother Kenny, D-Nice, and Ms. Melodie serving as members; Warner Bros. withdrew their offer, however Boogie Down Productions were able to sign a contract with Jive Records. By All Means Necessary, the group's follow-up was later released in 1988.

In 1988, a young fan was killed during a Boogie Down Productions and Public Enemy concerts. It would be a catalyst for Parker to form the Stop the Violence Movement, which was consisted of some of the most prominent East Coast rappers at the time. The group released one single, "Self Destruction", in 1989, with all proceeds going to the National Urban League. It topped the Hot Rap Songs chart for ten weeks and sold over 500 thousand copies. Boogie Down Productions, under Parker's control, would become increasingly nonviolent and political, with the subsequent releases Ghetto Music: The Blueprint of Hip Hop (1989), Edutainment (1990), Live Hardcore Worldwide (1991). Later that year, Kris, with a group of artists, released the compilation H.E.A.L. (Human Education Against Lies). After Prince Be of P.M. Dawn gave an interview in early 1992 where he criticized Parker, stating that "[he] wants to be a teacher, but a teacher of what?", Parker, in response, stormed one of the group's concerts with his bodyguards, forcing the group off the stage and performing Boogie Down Productions' songs. He issued an apology afterwards, but said that he was dissatisfied with those who "wish to demean and provoke me." Around that time, several members of the group sued him for half the ownership. Parker released his final album for Boogie Down Productions, Sex and Violence, the same year, which sold only 250,000 copies.

=== 1993–2000: Return of the Boom Bap, KRS-One, I Got Next, and A Retrospective ===
In 1993, Parker, under KRS-One, released his solo debut, Return of the Boom Bap. It reached Number 37 on the Billboard 200, and featured the singles "Outta Here" and "Sound of da Police", with the latter becoming a classic of golden age hip-hop and a defining anti-police anthem. Around that time, he was producing for Mad Lion and Channel Live, being involved in the former's debut album, Real Ting, and the latter's first single, "Mad Izm". Return of the Boom Bap was followed in 1995 by the eponymous KRS-One, which peaked at Number 19 on the Billboard 200. A commercial success, It featured contributions by Busta Rhymes and Das EFX, and produced two singles, "MC's Act Like They Don't Know" and "Rappaz R. N. Dainja"; the latter was described by Neil Kulkarni as "one of the greatest comeback singles in hip hop history". In 1996, he self-published his first book, The Science of Rap, which was reviewed favorably by Spin. He also founded the Temple of Hiphop (Note: According to The New Grove Dictionary of Music and Musicians, "the word 'hip hop' is not hyphenated to signify the unity among members of the hip hop community".) the same year, an organization that seeks to promote hip-hop as a culture.

In 1997, Parker released I Got Next, his most commercially successful album to date, peaking at Number 3 on the Billboard 200 and included several singles. "The MC" peaked at number 67 on the Billboard Hot R&B/Hip-Hop Songs chart, while the most successful single, "Step into a World (Rapture's Delight)", featured a sample of Blondie's "Rapture" and was covered by Sean Combs. Around that time, Parker had announced that was working on another album, Maximum Strength, although it was eventually scrapped. In 1999, Parker became a vice-president of A&R for Reprise Records, attempting to align the label's roster towards hip-hop and R&B artists. The next year, ending his relationship with Jive Records, he released A Retrospective in 2000.

=== 2001–present: Independent releases ===
In 2001, Parker resigned from Reprise Records and released The Sneak Attack on the Koch Entertainment label. The same year, he featured in "Return of Hip Hop (Ooh, Ooh)", a single from DJ Tomekk's debut album Return of Hip Hop. In 2002, he was involved in a short-lived feud with Nelly, after the former criticized commercially-oriented rap on "Clear Em Out," which was unintentionally promoted as a diss against the latter, prompting Nelly to respond with a verse on the "Hoc the Mic" remix and KRS-One to release "Ova Here" and call for a boycott of Nellyville. The feud ultimately fizzled out as Nellyville became a commercial success and both rappers moved on. In 2002, Parker released Spiritual Minded. The next year, he published his second book, an essay collection called Ruminations, and released Kristyles, which was his last album for Koch.

Parker released Keep Right in 2004 and Life on separate labels, which were less successful commercially. In 2007, Kris released Hip Hop Lives, a collaboration with Marley Marl, serving as a formal conclusion to the Bridge Wars. It was followed in 2008 by Adventures in Emceein and Maximum Strength, with the former album being the last of his to chart on the Billboard 200, while the latter was seen as a return to form. In 2009, Parker released his third book, The Gospel of Hip Hop, a spiritual manual on hip-hop. He has released around one album every year since.

== Personal life ==
In 1987, Parker married the rapper Ms. Melodie; they later divorced in 1992. The same year, his son Kris was born. KRS-One later married Simone G. Parker. In 2001, he was inducted into the Bronx Walk of Fame. His stepson, Randy Hubbard, died by suicide in 2007.

=== Political views ===
Parker is a vegetarian, opposing the consumption of beef, which he regards as toxic. Early in his career, he was described as a religious skeptic, although in 2002, he stated that he became a born again Christian. In 2004, Parker said during a panel discussion hosted by The New Yorker magazine that "we cheered when 9/11 happened". The comment was criticized by the New York Daily News, which called him an anarchist and speculated about his sympathies towards 9/11 victims. In response, Parker claimed that he had been misquoted.

Parker supported Republican Ron Paul during his 2012 presidential campaign, while criticizing President Barack Obama on Alex Jones' radio show, stating "[T]hey put a black face on the New World Order and now we all happy. KRS ain't buying it." During the 2016 United States presidential election, Parker indicated he was hesitant to support Democratic candidates Hillary Clinton or Bernie Sanders, arguing he was unconvinced by their professed support for ending police brutality. He stated that Republican candidate Jeb Bush had "some pretty cool" ideas, but added "they're not our ideas".

== Discography ==
=== Studio albums ===
- Return of the Boom Bap (1993)
- KRS-One (1995)
- I Got Next (1997)
- The Sneak Attack (2001)
- Spiritual Minded (2002)
- Kristyles (2003)
- Keep Right (2004)
- Life (2006)
- Adventures in Emceein (2008)
- Maximum Strength (2008)
- The BDP Album (2012)
- Never Forget (2013)
- Now Hear This (2015)
- The World Is Mind (2017)
- Street Light (First Edition) (2019)
- Between da Protests (2020)
- I M A M C R U 1 2 (2022)
- Temple of Hip Hop Global Awareness (2025)

=== Boogie Down Productions albums ===
- Criminal Minded (1987)
- By All Means Necessary (1988)
- Ghetto Music: The Blueprint of Hip Hop (1989)
- Edutainment (1990)
- Sex and Violence (1992)

=== Collaboration albums ===
- Hip Hop Lives with Marley Marl (2007)
- Survival Skills with Buckshot (2009)
- Meta-Historical with True Master (2010)
- Godsville with Showbiz (2011)
- Royalty Check with Bumpy Knuckles (2011)
