= Boogie Down Productions =

American hip-hop group

- Boogie Down Productions members in 1987 (clockwise): KRS-One, Scott La Rock and D-Nice

Background information
- Also known as: 12:41; Scott La Rock & the Celebrity Three
- Origin: The Bronx, New York, U.S.
- Genre: East Coast hip-hop
- Works: Discography
- Years active: 1985–1992
- Labels: B-Boy; Jive; RCA
- Past members: KRS-One; Ms. Melodie (deceased); Willie D; DJ Kenny Parker; Mad Lion; Moe; D-Nice; Scott La Rock (deceased)

Boogie Down Productions (BDP) was an American hip-hop group formed in the Bronx, New York City, in 1986. It originally consisted of KRS-One, D-Nice, and DJ Scott La Rock. DJ Scott La Rock was murdered on August 27, 1987. The name of the group, Boogie Down, derives from a nickname for the South Bronx.

The group pioneered the fusion of dancehall reggae and hip-hop music, and their debut LP Criminal Minded contains frank descriptions of life in the South Bronx during the late 1980s.

== Members ==
BDP's membership changed throughout its existence, the only constant being KRS-One. The group was founded by KRS-One and DJ Scott La Rock, with producer Lee Smith, who was essential in the production of the songs on Criminal Minded, being added as a member shortly after.

From those beginnings, BDP members and collaborators included Ced Gee of Ultramagnetic MC's, Lee Smith, Scott La Rock, D-Nice, Henry Wilkerson PoppyDa, Kenny Parker (KRS-One's younger brother), Just-Ice, ICU, McBoo, Ms. Melodie, Heather B., Scottie Morris, Tony Rahsan, Willie D., RoboCop, Harmony, DJ Red Alert, Jay Kramer, D-Square, Rebekah Foster, Scott Whitehill, Scott King, Chris Tait and Sidney Mills.

BDP as a group essentially ended because KRS-One began recording and performing under his own name rather than the group name. Lee Smith, who has co-producer credit on the original 12" "South Bronx" single, was the first to be jettisoned by KRS-One and the future new label after Scott's death.

In the liner notes on BDP's 1992 album Sex and Violence, KRS-One writes: "BDP in 1992 is KRS-One, Willie D, and Kenny Parker! BDP is not D-Nice, Jamal-Ski, Harmony, Ms. Melodie, and Scottie Morris. They are not down with BDP so stop frontin'." Steve "Flash" Juon of RapReviews.com claimed that this initiated the ultimate breakup of the group.

== Cultural influences and impact ==
=== "The Bridge Wars" ===
A conflict arose in the late 1980s concerning the origins of hip-hop, and BDP made conscious efforts in its early work to establish its interpretation of the issue. The origins of hip-hop to many, including BDP, are believed to be from the Bronx. A rival hip-hop collective, known as the Juice Crew's lyrics, were misunderstood to contain a claim in the song "The Bridge" that hip-hop was directly a result of artists originating from Queensbridge. Boogie Down and KRS retorted angrily with songs such as "The Bridge is Over" and "South Bronx," which started one of the first notable hip-hop wars as MC Shan, Marley Marl, Roxanne Shanté and Blaq Poet all released songs featuring verses personally attacking KRS and Scott La Rock. But the Bridge Wars were short-lived, and after Scott La Rock's death, KRS began to concentrate on socially conscious music.

While Criminal Minded contained vivid descriptions of South Bronx street life, BDP changed after Scott's death. Lee Smith was dropped and KRS-One adopted the Teacha moniker and made a deliberate attempt at creating politically and socially conscious hip-hop. BDP was influential in provoking political and social consciousness in hip-hop, for example in "Stop The Violence" on 1988's By All Means Necessary.

=== Jamaican inspirations ===
The Jamaican influence in Criminal Minded is well illustrated by the use of the "Mad Mad" or "Diseases" riddim started in 1981 with reggae star Yellowman's song "Zunguzunguzeng." BDP used this riff in the song "Remix for P is Free," and it was later resampled by artists such as Black Star and dead prez. As an album regarded by many as the start of the gangsta rap movement, Criminal Minded played an important role in reaffirming the social acceptance of having Jamaican roots. BDP referenced reggae in a way that helped to solidify Jamaica's place in modern hip-hop culture.

== Political and social activism ==
From its start, BDP affected the development of hip-hop and gave a sincere voice to the reality of life in the South Bronx, a section of New York City clouded with poverty and crime. With Criminal Minded, the group combined the sounds of LaRock's harsh, spare, reggae-influenced beats and KRS-One's long-winded rhyme style on underground classics such as "9mm Goes Bang" and "South Bronx," the album's gritty portrait of life on the streets (as well as the firearms that adorned its cover) influenced the gangsta rap movement that began in earnest two years later.

BDP's influence in the creation and development of gangsta rap highlights the cultural significance and impact of the type of music BDP and other early hip-hop artists like it created. This subgenre of hip-hop is most closely associated with hard-core hip-hop and is widely misinterpreted as promoting violence and gang activity. This misinterpretation or stigma is closely related to Boogie Down Productions and the general purpose behind their underlying themes of violence. For instance, the cover art of Criminal Minded displays the two artists in the group brandishing drawn guns and displaying other firearms. This is not an encouragement of the violence described in BDP's music, but a portrayal of the violence in the South Bronx as a means of expression, escape, and even condemnation. This album art is not meant to advocate violence but to challenge the conception of a criminal, to assert that those who are really criminally minded are those who hold power.

BDP's music became significantly more politically astute after Scott La Rock's death. KRS-One published four more albums under the title Boogie Down Productions, and each was increasingly innovative and expanded from the thuggish imagery of Criminal Minded, exploring themes like black-on-black crime and black radicalism, using a riff on the words of Malcolm X, "by any means necessary", which became the title of the second BDP album, and remains one of the most political hip-hop albums to date. It was in this album that KRS defined himself as the "teacha" or "teacher", symbolizing his emphasis on educating his audience members and fans about relevant social issues surrounding the African-American experience.

During his time in association with Boogie Down Productions, KRS-One joined other rappers to create the Stop the Violence Movement, which addressed many of the issues brought up in BDP's music and is the most conscious effort displayed by KRS-One and BDP of political activism and engagement. The movement created the single "Self-Destruction" in 1989 through the collaboration of BDP (KRS-One, D-Nice & Ms. Melodie), Stetsasonic (Delite, Daddy-O, Wise, and Frukwan), Kool Moe Dee, MC Lyte, Doug E. Fresh, Just-Ice, Heavy D, Biz Markie, and Public Enemy (Chuck D & Flavor Flav), with the aim of spreading awareness about violence in African-American and hip-hop communities. All proceeds from this effort went to the National Urban League.

== Discography ==
=== Studio albums ===
- Criminal Minded (1987)
- By All Means Necessary (1988)
- Ghetto Music: The Blueprint of Hip Hop (1989)
- Edutainment (1990)
- Sex and Violence (1992)

== Bibliography ==
- "KRS-One." Africana: The Encyclopedia of the African and African American Experience, Second Edition. Ed. Kwame Anthony Appiah, Henry Louis Gates Jr. New York: Oxford UP, 2008. Oxford African American Studies Center. ISBN 978-0195170559
