= Ecosphere =

Ecosphere may refer to:

- EcoSphere (aquarium), a sealed blown-glass miniature aquarium
- Ecosphere (ecology) or biosphere, the global sum of all ecosystems
- Ecosphere (planetary), a planetary closed ecological system
- Ecosphere (social enterprise), focusing on sustainable development in Spiti Valley, Himachal Pradesh, India
- Ecosphere, an early name for the circumstellar habitable zone, range of orbits around a star where liquid water is possible
- Ecosphere (journal), an open-access journal published by the Ecological Society of America
- Ecosphere, a 2010 album by American composer Rand Steiger
- "Ecosphere", a track on the 2006 album Ink Is My Drink by American hip hop duo Panacea
