= Tasteful Licks Records =

- Parent company: Remedy Media Group
- Founded: 2005
- Genre: Electronic, instrumental hip hop, progressive hip hop, R&B/soul, rock
- Country of origin: U.S.
- Location: Raleigh, North Carolina
- Official website: www.tastefullicks.com

Tasteful Licks Records is an independent artist-run record label in Raleigh, North Carolina. Tasteful Licks, also referred to as TLr, is a wholly owned subsidiary of Remedy Media Group. The name is derived from the musician's term for a quick and sudden improvisation done in such a way as not to distract from the melody or overall rhythm. The managing member for Tasteful Licks is Jason Mosby.

== History ==
Tasteful Licks Records was founded by Remedy Media Group in 2005. As with all RMG subsidiaries, Tasteful Licks was constructed as an independent ‘productization’ of consolidated Remedy services and capabilities. Being primarily artist run, the label is known for their emphasis on artist development, a concentration on the profile, professionalism, and longevity of an artist’s career, rather than product development which focuses on the monetization of individual releases.

== Recent ==
In the first quarter of 2010, Tasteful Licks announced that it would no longer manufacture and distribute compact discs for its artist works, instead producing multi-media USB memory cards with music, videos, photos, interviews, and other additional content.

== Artists (past and present) ==
- Antithesis
- DJ Jamad
- Floyd the Locsmif
- Frequency Benders Incorporated
- JLaine
- Mono/Poly
- Next Time Gadget
- Panacea
- Rasta Root
- TFox
- Wes Felton
- Zo!

== Selected discography ==
- JLaine – Apple Jons (TLR-1001, 2007)
- Next.Time.Gadget – Bit[r] (TLR-0101, 2007)
- DJ Jamad - Afromatic (TLR-0301, 2008)
- Wes Felton – Distraction City (TLR-1101, 2008)
- Panacea – A Mind on a Ship Through Time (TLR-1501, 2008)
- TFox - The Great Junction (2010)
