= Keep Right =

Studio album by KRS-One
- Released: July 13, 2004
- Recorded: September 2003–April 2004
- Genre: East Coast hip hop; political hip hop
- Length: 51:25
- Label: Grit Records
- Producer: Inebriated Rhythm (exec.); Simone Parker (exec.); B. Creative; Daneja; DJ Qbert; Domingo; Fatin "10" Horton; Gato; Gordon "Commissioner Gordon" Williams; John Doe; KRS-One; Rich Nice; Soul Supreme; Statik Selektah

KRS-One chronology
D.I.G.I.T.A.L. (2003)	Keep Right (2004)	Life (2006)

Singles from Keep Right
- 1. "Let 'Em Have It" Released: November 18, 2003; 2. "Illegal Business" Released: July 27, 2004

Professional ratings
Review scores
Source	Rating
AllHipHop	4/5 stars
AllMusic	3/5 stars
HipHopDX	4/5
Now	2/5
Prefix	5/10
RapReviews	5/10
The Rolling Stone Album Guide	3/5 stars
Stylus	C+

Keep Right is the seventh solo studio album (and thirteenth overall) by American rapper and record producer KRS-One. It was released on July 13, 2004 via Grit Records bundled with a free DVD. Production was handled by Domingo, B. Creative, Daneja, Fatin "10" Horton, Soul Supreme, Gato, Commissioner Gordon, DJ Qbert, John Doe, Rich Nice, Statik Selektah and KRS-One himself. It features guest appearances from Minister Server, Afrika Bambaataa, L da Headtoucha, Akbar, An Ion, Illin' P, Joe, Mad Lion, Mix Master Mike and Supastition.

The album peaked at number 80 on the Billboard Top R&B/Hip-Hop Albums.

== Track listing ==
No.	Title	Writer(s)	Producer(s)	Length
1.	"Club Shoutouts"	Lawrence Parker; G. "NYCE" Durant	KRS-One	1:00
2.	"Are You Ready for This"	Parker	Domingo	3:04
3.	"Illegal Business Remix 2004"	Parker	Domingo	3:45
4.	"The Prayer of Afrika Bambaataa" (featuring Afrika Bambaataa)	Lance Taylor	KRS-One	0:39
5.	"You Gon Go?"	Parker	Fatin "10" Horton	4:32
6.	"Phucked"	Parker	Fatin "10" Horton	3:08
7.	"A Call to Order" (featuring Afrika Bambaataa)	Taylor		0:31
8.	"Everybody Rise" (featuring L da Headtoucha)	Parker; Larry Ansa	Soul Supreme	2:23
9.	"Stop Skeemin'" (featuring Joe)	Parker; Joe	Rich Nice; "Commissioner Gordon" Williams	2:56
10.	"...And Then Again..." (featuring Minister Server)	Parker	B. Creative	1:51
11.	"My Mind Is Racing"	Parker; Durant	John Doe	2:37
12.	"Here We Go" (featuring Mix Master Mike)		DJ Qbert	1:41
13.	"Me Man" (featuring Minister Server)	Parker	Domingo	1:45
14.	"Feel This"	Parker; Durant	Gato	2:25
15.	"Dream" (featuring Minister Server)			1:03
16.	"I Been There"	Parker	B. Creative	2:28
17.	"Freestyle Ministry (Server Verbals)" (featuring Minister Server)	Parker; Minister Server	Daneja	2:16
18.	"The I" (featuring Mad Lion)	Parker; Oswald Priest	KRS-One	2:49
19.	"Bucshot Shoutout"			0:19
20.	"Rap History" (featuring Afrika Bambaataa)	Taylor		1:18
21.	"Let 'Em Have It"	Parker	Soul Supreme	3:28
22.	"Still Spittin'" (featuring Akbar, L da Headtoucha, Illin' P, Supastition and An Ion)	Parker; Akbar Abdullah; Ansa; "Illin' P". Russell; Kam Moye; V. "An Ion" McCoy	Daneja	4:32
23.	"The Cutclusion"		Statik Selektah	0:47
24.	"Keep Right" (DVD)
Total length:				51:25

== Charts ==
Chart (2004)	Peak position
US Top R&B/Hip-Hop Albums (Billboard)	80
