= Yeh for Games =

Online service company

Yeh! for Games
- Type: America's First Online Gaming Service Company
- Industry: Online game
- Founded: February 24, 2006
- Headquarters: Nevada, United States
- Area served: Virtual world
- Services: World of Warcraft, Rift (video game), Dungeons & Dragons Online, City of Heroes, Xbox 360
- Website: www.yehforgames.com

Yeh! for Games / YehforGames.com is an American online servicing company that provides MMORPG gaming services for busy professionals and students who are seeking alternative methods by which to level and equip their online game characters. It is the first American gaming company of its kind to serve those in the online video gaming community. The primary massively multiplayer online game serviced is Blizzard Entertainment's mega-popular World of Warcraft, but they serve other games as well.

== Company Information & History ==
According to the Secretary of State of Nevada, Yeh! for Games was founded in 2006. They employ professional gamers to provide video gaming services.

The company was featured in the gaming documentary Second Skin, an exploration into the lives of those who participate in the online gaming community.

== Controversy ==
Some in the gaming community feel that character-leveling services are unethical and illegal. Yeh! for Games Director Aires da Cruz thwarts such claims saying, "For us the most important thing is that we can provide a good service to our clients and that their accounts are safe with us, and nobody's ever been banned using our service."

Some have claimed the services YehforGames.com provides has the propensity to save marriages, relationships, careers, and a great deal of personal time. The problem of video game addiction to games such as World of Warcraft can affect marriages and careers, being featured in the media on shows such as The Tyra Banks Show. Many attest that Yeh! for Games services help alleviate gaming addiction, getting people more frequently away from their computers and allowing enhanced gaming enjoyment instead of gaming stress.

== Partnerships & philanthropy ==
Yeh! for Games partners with IE3 Global Internships to provide college students and recent graduates with opportunities for professional experience in online business, marketing, customer service and the provision of gaming services.

In 2010, Yeh! for Games partnered with the Ritz-Carlton by sponsoring a sea turtle hatchling nursery aquarium now located in their children's play area. Yeh! for Games actively supports marine conservation and donates 10% of their profits to sea turtle conservation organizations.

YehforGames.com also provides free services to maintain the character accounts of active military serving overseas. Lt. John Kendall of the 4th Infantry Division (United States) states, "We're seeing some actual real world PvP over here... all my buddies back home they're playing away at World of Warcraft and they're gaining on me so I wanted to make sure I could catch up quick when I finally get home."
