= Starchild (O.C. album) =

Studio album by O.C.
- Released: 2005
- Recorded: 2004–2005
- Genre: Hip-hop
- Length: 48:02
- Label: Grit Records
- Producer: Soul Supreme; Statik Selektah; Floyd the Locsmif; Vanguard

O.C. chronology
Bon Appetit (2001)	Starchild (2005)	Smoke and Mirrors (2005)

Professional ratings
Review scores
Source	Rating
RapReviews	9/10 stars
HipHopDX.com	3.5/5 stars

Starchild is the fourth studio album released by American rapper, O.C. (D.I.T.C.), in early 2005 through Boston-based imprint, Grit Records. The album was initially released in Japan, with a planned release in the US, but it was shelved due to problems with sample clearances for a number of the songs.

Unlike O.C.'s previous albums, Starchild does not feature any guest artists, apart from Pharoahe Monch (Organized Konfusion), who is featured on "Evaridae", but only sings the hook. It was also the first album not to feature any production or assistance from members of D.I.T.C. O.C. tried to go for a new sound with talented and lesser-known producers, such as Vanguard, Floyd the Locsmif (credited as "Locsmif"), and Swedish Soul Supreme. Starchild also features scratching and cuts performed by DJ Revolution and DJ Statik Selektah.

OC and Grit subsequently announced that the Japanese release was a promotional version and not the final official version. They announced that the official release would have additional songs. The album was reported to be remixed by Pete Rock, and renamed Soulchild. Following this, the album was reported to be remixed by !llmind and Slopfunkdust. Neither version was ever released as O.C. left Grit Records.

== Reception ==
Allmusic's John Bush states "Starchild, recaptured some of the critical acclaim lost with Bon Appetit, and resulted in a new deal with Hieroglyphics Imperium Recordings."

== Track listing ==
#	Title	Producer(s)	Performer (s)
1	"Intro"	Statik Selektah	O.C.
2	"Evaridae"	Floyd the Locsmif	O.C., Pharoahe Monch
3	"Who Run It?"	Floyd the Locsmif	O.C.
4	"The Professional"	Vanguard	O.C.
5	"1nce Again"	Soul Supreme	O.C.
6	"Ya Don't Stop"	Soul Supreme	O.C.
7	"Story To Tell"	Vanguard	O.C.
8	"What Am I Supposed To Do?"	Soul Supreme	O.C.
9	"Getaway"	Vanguard	O.C.
10	"Memory Lane"	Soul Supreme	O.C.
11	"Special"	Soul Supreme	O.C.
12	"Who Run It? (Remix)"	Floyd the Locsmif	O.C.
13	"Outro"	Statik Selektah	O.C.

== Samples ==
- "1nce Again"
  - "Let Me Know the Truth" by Four Tops
- "Getaway"
  - "Fare Thee Well" by Bell & James
- "Special"
  - "You're Special" by Commodores
- "Story to Tell"
  - "Try Love Again" by The Natural Four
- "The Professional"
  - "Books and Basketball (Monologue)" by Billy Preston and Syreeta
- "What Am I Supposed to Do?"
  - "Walkin' in the Rain With the One I Love" by Love Unlimited
- "Ya Don't Stop"
  - "You're Just What I Need" by Betty Wright
- "Memory Lane"
  - "Remember the Pain" by 21st Century
