= Hidden Gems =

Hidden Gems may refer to:

- Hidden Gems (O.C. album), 2007
- Hidden Gems (Ace of Base album), 2015
- Hidden Gems (The Blue Stones album), 2021
- Hidden Gems, an EP by AP Dhillon, 2021
- Hidden Gemz, an album by 22Gz, 2025
