= TLR =

TLR may refer to:

== Biology ==
- Toll-like receptors, proteins of the immune system
- Tonic labyrinthine reflex, in newborn humans

== Travel ==
- Suzuki TL1000R motorcycle
- The IATA airport code for Mefford Field, California, USA
- The ICAO airline code for Air Libya, Libya

== Other ==
- Twin-lens reflex camera
- Tasteful Licks Records
- Tony La Russa
- Terra Lawson-Remer
