= TFOX =

American singer-songwriter

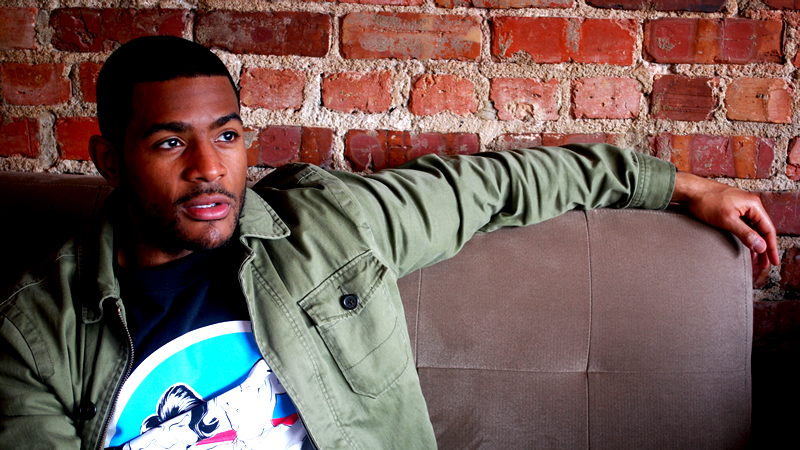
- TFOX

Background information
- Born: Travis Ian Fox; Washington D.C., U.S.
- Origin: Virginia, U.S.
- Genres: Funk, soul, rock, hip-hop
- Occupations: Singer, songwriter, multi-instrumentalist, arranger, composer, music producer, graphic designer
- Instruments: Piano, keyboards, guitar, bass guitar, drums, concertina
- Label: TFOX Music

TFOX (born Travis Ian Fox) is an American singer-songwriter, multi-instrumentalist, and record producer whose sound can be described as a jazz, soul, hip-hop, rock fusion.

== Early life ==
Travis Ian Fox was born in Washington D.C. into a music-loving family. His mother was the lead singer and his father the manager of multiple Top 40 cover bands from the '70s through the '90s. It was during this time that TFOX was exposed to several genres of music. Before he could read or write, TFOX learned to play drums, and by the age of 7 he would fill in during band rehearsals. At 13, he picked up the keyboard, and at 15, taught himself to play bass. With the advent of MTV, groups like A-Ha, Human League, Spandau Ballet, and The Clash caught TFOX's attention. In college, TFOX discovered his love for piano and guitar, becoming proficient in both through independent study and extensive practice.

A young TFOX was often ribbed by his peers for listening to "old school" music, consisting principally of Stevie Wonder, Prince, and Maze featuring Frankie Beverly. These artists piqued TFOX's burgeoning musical interests at the time. As his musical interests matured, TFOX devoted a great deal of time to studying musical pioneers such as Tony! Toni! Toné!, A Tribe Called Quest, Meshell Ndegeocello, Pete Rock and CL Smooth, The Pharcyde, and D’Angelo. While his introduction to music started with Top 40 sounds, today his tastes remain more obscure and eclectic, which is evident in the music he creates.

TFOX's music has been inspired by soul, funk, rock, hip-hop, blues, psychedelic, folk and jazz. His biggest influences include Prince, Singers Unlimited, Stevie Wonder, J Dilla, Antonio Carlos Jobim, The Beatles, Todd Rundgren, Radiohead, Danny Elfman, and Joni Mitchell.

== Career ==
TFOX began composing tracks for what was going to be his debut album in 1999 with only a four track recorder, a snare, a Kawai mini keyboard, and a Rhodes piano. Around this time, TFOX met his production partner and friend JLaine while attending George Mason University (GMU) and began performing live with JLaine's group, UrbanMinds. Sharing a love for the same types of music, TFOX and JLaine started collaborating. The production duo came to be known as The Wonderboys. With the knowledge gained from performing with UrbanMinds and his musical marriage with the veteran JLaine, TFOX began developing his own style.

TFOX started recording digitally and by 2003, had recorded tracks that would ultimately become his debut album, The Music. He earned his break in 2004 co-producing singer-songwriter K’Alyn's third solo album Verse 1, Chapter III, alongside JLaine and K’Alyn.

Working on his first major production gave TFOX the drive to put his debut album back on track. The Music was released independently in 2006 under TFOX's own production company, Lady Lucy Music. It attracted a considerable amount of attention from music lovers globally and was his coming out to the music world.

Since the release of The Music, TFOX has made a name for himself as an accredited and sought-after producer. TFOX, JLaine, and Wes Felton formed a hip-hop group, Antithesis, who released a self-titled album in 2008 and a sophomore album, Love Daze, in 2010. That same year, TFOX released The Great Junction, whose specific sound and underlying theme were inspired by The Beatles’ concept albums. This album garnered international attention, including that of French music video and film director Mikael Colombu, who had previously worked with Drake and The Weeknd. Colombu created music videos for two TFOX singles, Ice Cycles and Naughtytime. He also facilitated an introduction between TFOX and Grammy-nominated producer Hxzel, who was a fan of The Great Junction album.

TFOX and Hxzel collaborated on a hip-hop album, We Are Grawlix, which was released in 2016. The first 300 vinyl copies sold out quickly and set the duo up for success with their second album, The Brink, in 2018. TFOX also released a solo digital album that year, called Spidermends. This experimental album traversed electronic, soul, and hip-hop genres and earned TFOX a loyal online following. He continued sharing his music on his social media channels and received praises from artists like DJ Spinna, Raphael Saadiq, Marcus Machado, Glenn Lewis, Slakah the Beatchild and DJ Jazzy Jeff.

His next big break came when TFOX got the opportunity to work with industry giant Raphael Saadiq on an original song for the 2021 Hulu motion picture The United States vs. Billie Holiday, starring Andra Day. He played drums on Tigress and Tweed, sung by Day and produced by Saadiq. The song was nominated for a Golden Globe Award for Best Original Song, and a Critics’ Choice Movie Award for Best Song. TFOX also played on and produced two songs and was featured on another on Marcus Machado’s Aquarious Purple from Soul Step Records in 2021. After a successful collaboration on that album, Machado featured TFOX on another song called "Pass Me By" on Blue Diamonds, a critically acclaimed project released in 2023. The single got the attention of Questlove, who shared his appreciation for the duo on Instagram.

In between Machado’s projects, TFOX continued to create his own music and curate his sound, writing and producing two singles (“Monster” and “Beneath the Stars”) both featuring Machado on guitar. He compiled two full albums, Volcano and Warmed-Over Leftovers, each of which are Volume One in their respective multi-volume series. Warmed-Over Leftovers is an instrumental arrangement of ideas, sketches, and beats, and was released on June 27, 2023 on Bandcamp. Volcano, with its rock-influenced sound, will be released at a later date, and will have three volumes.

== Discography ==
Year	Artist	Album	Label
2003	TFOX	Devoid of Vocal Accompaniment	Lady Lucy Music
2004	The Wonderboys	Music Revelation - Instrumentals Vol. 1	Lady Lucy Music
2005	K'Alyn	Verse 1, Chapter 3	Eklectrik Soul
2006	TFOX	The Music	TFOX Music
2008	Antithesis	Antithesis	Tasteful Licks Records
2010	Antithesis	Love Daze	Tasteful Licks Records
2010	TFOX	The Great Junction	TFOX Music/Tasteful Licks Records
2016	Hxzel & TFOX	We Are Grawlix	Supreme Crate Records
2018	TFOX	Spidermends	Supreme Crate Records
2018	Hxzel & TFOX	The Brink	Supreme Crate Records
2021	Andra Day (Drums credits)	"Tigress & Tweed" (Single)	Warner Records
2021	Marcus Machado (Vocals/Co-Producer credits)	Aquarious Purple	Soul Step Records
2021	TFOX	Spidermends Re-Release	TFOX Music
2022	TFOX	"Monster" featuring Marcus Machado (Single)	TFOX Music
2022	TFOX	"Beneath the Stars" featuring Marcus Machado (Single)	TFOX Music
2023	Marcus Machado (Vocals credits)	Blue Diamonds	Soul Step Records
2023	TFOX	Warmed-Over Leftovers	TFOX Music
