= The Mix Tape (KRS-One album) =

Mixtape by KRS-One
- Released: August 27, 2002
- Recorded: 2002
- Studio: Pride Rock Studios (Los Angeles, California)
- Genre: Hip hop
- Length: 24:53
- Label: Koch
- Producer: G. Simone (exec.); A-Sharp; B.J. Wheeler; Creative Minds Combined; Da Beatminerz; Inebriated Beats; KRS-One; Pleasure King

KRS-One chronology
Spiritual Minded (2002)	The Mix Tape (2002)	Kristyles (2003)

Alternative cover
- European release

Professional ratings
Review scores
Source	Rating
AllMusic	4/5 stars
RapReviews	8.5/10
The New Rolling Stone Album Guide	4/5 stars

The Mix Tape is a mixtape by American rapper and producer KRS-One. It was released on August 27, 2002 via Koch Records in promotion of the musician's 6th studio album, Kristyles, the following year. Recording sessions took place at Pride Rock Studios in Los Angeles, with additional recording at Salaamin Studios, also in Los Angeles. Production was handled by Inebriated Beats, Milann Miles, Rick Long, A-Sharp, BJ Wheeler, Da Beatminerz, Pleasure King and KRS-One himself. It features guest appearances from Kim-O, Kool DJ Red Alert, Priest and Steph Lova.

It is quite short, with four interludes making up the 13 tracks. It is known for the song "Ova Here", which disses Nelly, as KRS-One was under the impression Nelly dissed him on the track "#1" from his album Nellyville and the Training Day soundtrack.

A proper but very limited version of the street album was released in Europe under the title Prophets vs. Profits. That version features lesser skits and has a few additional tracks, although a pair of tracks on The Mix Tape is missing from Prophets vs. Profits.

== Track listing ==
All tracks are written by Lawrence Parker, except for track 9 written with Oswald Priest.

The Mix Tape
No.	Title	Producer(s)	Length
1.	"Ova Here"	Da Beatminerz	2:56
2.	"Things Is About to Change"	Creative Minds Combined	2:34
3.	"Splash"	Pleasure King; A-Sharp	2:24
4.	"Kim-O/Steph-Lover Shout-Outs" (featuring Kim-O and Steph Lova)		0:19
5.	"Down the Charts"	Creative Minds Combined	2:10
6.	"Priest Shout-Outs" (featuring Priest)		0:10
7.	"The Message 2002"	Inebriated Beats	3:53
8.	"Kreditz"		0:38
9.	"Stop It"	KRS-One	1:37
10.	"Problemz"	Inebriated Beats	3:14
11.	"Deejay Red Alert Shout-Outs" (featuring Kool DJ Red Alert)		0:29
12.	"Ova Here (Remix)"	Da Beatminerz	2:58
13.	"Preserve the Kulture"	BJ Wheeler	1:31
Total length:			24:53

The Mix Tape (Japanese edition bonus track)
No.	Title	Length
14.	"Get Yourself Up (Pleasure King & A-Sharp Remix)"

All tracks are written by Lawrence Parker, except for track 6 written with Aretha Franklin and Nadja Head.

Prophets vs. Profits
No.	Title	Producer(s)	Length
1.	"Ova Here"	Da Beatminerz
2.	"Things Is About to Change"	Milann Miles; Rick Long
3.	"Splash"	A-Sharp; Pleasure King
4.	"My People"	Alumni
5.	"Kreditz"	Milann Miles; Rick Long
6.	"I Remember"	J Rocc; Mad Lion
7.	"Down the Chart"	Milann Miles; Rick Long
8.	"So You Really Don't Want It"	Jim Bean
9.	"Womanology"	Soul Supreme
10.	"2nd Kreditz"
11.	"Stop It"	KRS-One; Mad Lion
12.	"Problemz"	Vangaurd
13.	"Believe It!"	Soul Supreme

== Personnel ==
- DJ Tiné Tim – engineering, mixing
- Harold English – engineering, mixing
- G. Simone – executive producer
- Jeff Chenault – artwork

== Charts ==
Chart (2002)	Peak position
US Top R&B/Hip-Hop Albums (Billboard)	32
US Independent Albums (Billboard)	17
