= Floyd the Locsmif =

Floyd The Locsmif
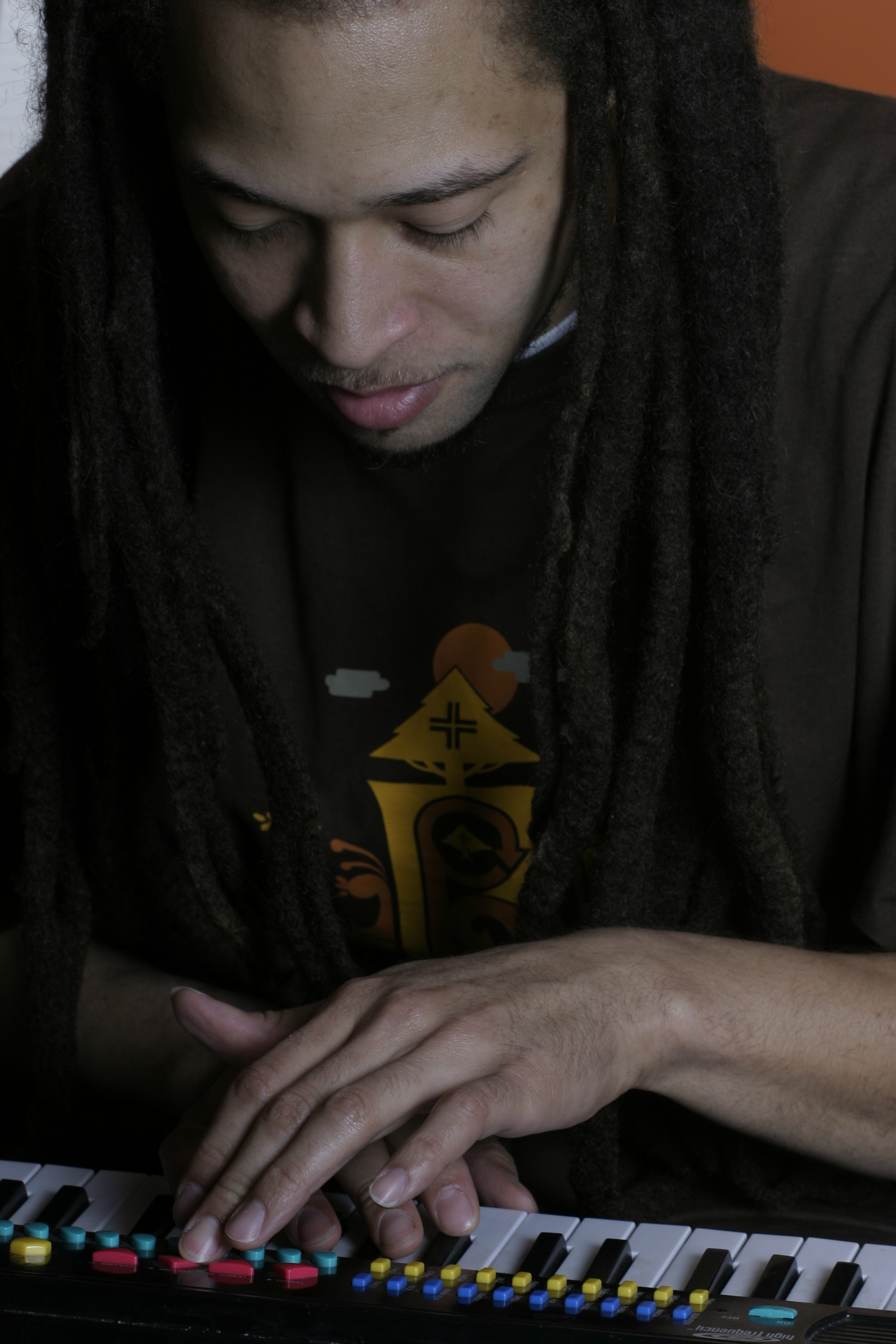
- Floyd the Locsmif

Background information
- Birth name: Leon Douglas
- Origin: Fitzgerald, Georgia, U.S.
- Genres: Hip Hop
- Occupation: Producer
- Labels: Tasteful Licks Records
- Website: Floyd The Locsmif

Leon Douglas, better known under the name Floyd The Locsmif, is an American music producer living in Atlanta, Georgia. He was born and raised in Fitzgerald, Georgia. Starting with pause mix experiment tapes in the late 1980s Floyd The Locsmif has since produced music for some of the most respected emcees in underground & independent hip-hop.

== Music ==
Alongside DJ Jamad (Afromentals/The Aphilliates), Locsmif entered the mixtape scene in 2004 with the highly acclaimed Outskirts: The Unofficial Lost OutKast Remixes, an OutKast remix CD, consequently expanding Locsmif's fan base and laying the foundation for his widely received Divine Dezignz series. In early 2005, Locsmif's Divine Dezignz 1: Discovery, a collection of his original soul and hip-hop instrumentals, made its debut at iTunes and was featured on three consecutive iTunes Street Official Mixtapes. Adding upon the success of Discovery, Locsmif secured a national distribution deal with Fontana through High Wire Music to release Divine Dezignz 1.2: Re-Discovered. Guests on the record include Lil Sci (from Scienz Of Life and Sol Uprising), Stahhr (from MF Doom / King Geedorah’s “Take Me To Your Leader” LP), and others.

Whether it's jazzy soul or overground ruggedness, Locsmif's clientele includes Atlanta's own Cee Lo Green, 50 Cent for which the Locsmif produced Maybe We Crazy from 50's video game Bulletproof soundtrack that snagged Best Original Song in a Video Game at Spike TVs 2006 Video Game Awards. His work on O.C.’s Starchild album earned critical acclaim.

Locsmif's versatility in the music marketplace has landed him spots on various mixtapes and compilations such as Shaman Work Recordings' 2005 Beatology Vol. 2, a commission to produce the soundtrack to Coca-Cola/Nestea's national Ice campaign, which promoted the launch of NesteaIce.com in May 2005.

Additionally, Locsmif hosted a weekly Hip-Hop mix show segment called INTHELOOP on Sirius Satellite Radio and has been a featured guest DJ on Shade45's Rep Your Set show.

Floyd The Locsmif has also set up his own entertainment company called "In The Loop Entertainment". He is now being represented by the independent record label Tasteful Licks.

== Discography ==
=== Releases ===
- 2011: Divine Dezignz #3: Dirty Canvas, In The Loop Recordings
- 2009: Divine Dezignz #2: Soul, Etc., In The Loop Recordings/Tasteful Licks Records
- 2007: Interludez and Essentialz, In The Loop Recordings/Tasteful Licks Records
- 2005: Divine Dezignz #1.3: Deluxe Discovery, In The Loop Recordings/High Wire Music
- 2005: Divine Dezignz #1.2: Re-Discovered, In The Loop Recordings/High Wire Music
- 2005: Divine Dezignz #1: Discovery, In The Loop Recordings/High Wire Music
- 2004: Outskirts: The Unofficial Lost OutKast Remixes (with DJ Jamad), In The Loop Recordings

=== Production ===
- 1998: Southbound Strategies / Swamp Fields / Moment Of Silence, Wrong Crowd Records
- 2002: Rhyme Fluid, Sub Verse Music
- 2003: Sol Power, (Sol Power), Shaman Work
- 2004: Cee-Lo Green... Is The Soul Machine, (Sometimes), Arista
- 2004: Outskirts: The Unofficial Lost OutKast Remixes, In The Loop Recordings/Tasteful Licks Records
- 2005: Divine Dezigns #1.2 Re-Discovered, In The Loop Recordings/Tasteful Licks Records
- 2005: Divine Dezignz #1: Discovery, In The Loop Recordings/Tasteful Licks Records
- 2005: Getaway/Evaridae, Word Of Mouth
- 2005: Shaman Work Presents: The Family Files Vol.2, Watching U, Fluid), Shaman Work
- 2005: Starchild, Grit Records
- 2005: The Hear After, (Audio Visual), Penalty Recordings
- 2005: The Leak Edition Volume 1, (Always Bless), Shaman Work
- 2005: Undercover Cuts 27, (Audio Visual), Undercover Mag
- 2006: Will Rap For Food, (Locsmif, Freestyle), Major League Entertainment
- 2007: The Leak Edition Vol.2, (Always Bless, Bonus), Shaman Work
- 2008: Then What Happened?, (What You Holdin'?), BBE
