= Jon Laine =

American hip-hop producer and drummer

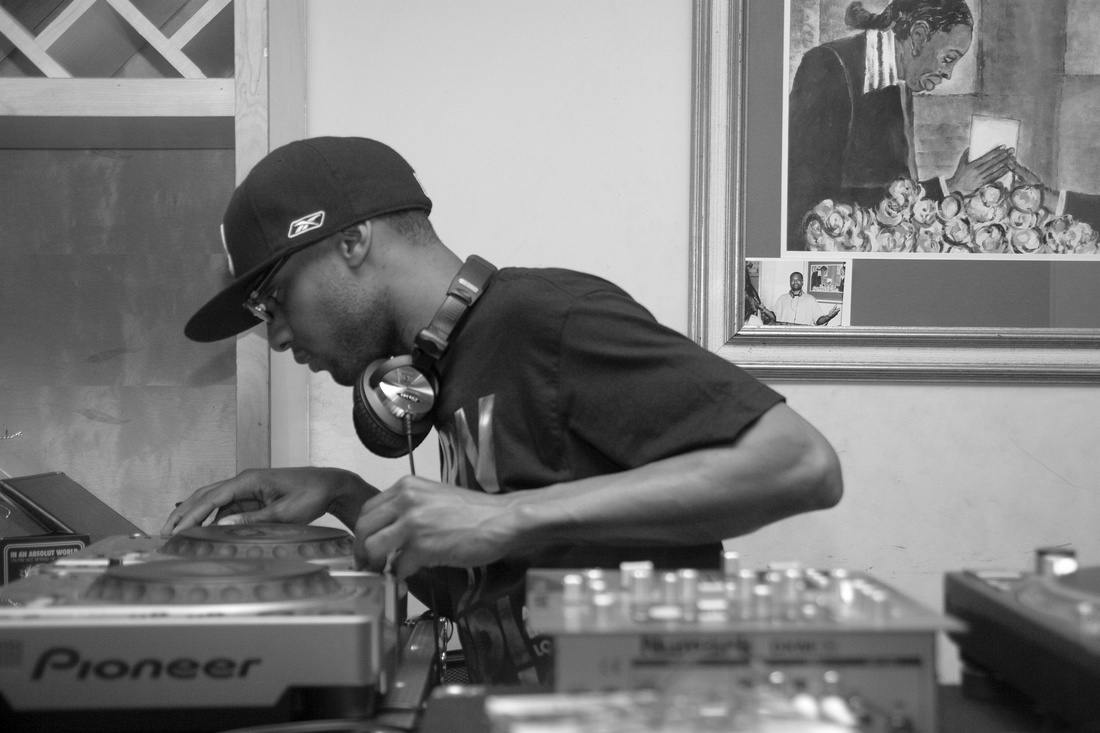
- Jon at the turntables

Background information
- Also known as: Jon Laine
- Born: Jonathan Ernest Laine; August 15, 1975 (age 50); Falls Church, Virginia, U.S.
- Origin: Falls Church, Virginia
- Genres: Hip-hop, Soul, Rock
- Occupations: drummer, music producer
- Labels: FastLaine Music, OTB Management
- Website: JONLAINE

Jonathan Ernest Laine (born August 15, 1975) is a Washington DC–based hip-hop producer and drummer.

== Background ==
Jon was born an only child to Haitian parents in Falls Church, Virginia. He has three close cousins. Only recently (in 2009) he connected with his half sister. In 2011 Jon married Allison Gallo Laine and they reside in Northern Virginia. There are no musicians in his family. Nevertheless, Jon started having an interest in being a musician early on. He taught himself how to play drums listening to his mother's collection of vinyl and watching metal and rap videos on MTV while emulating the drummers he saw. It was not until his senior year of high school that he began classical percussion lessons. During that time he played as the pit percussionist in plays and musicals. Jon was heavily influenced in marching band and drum corps style drumming. Some of his first major musical experiences were in the National Symphony Orchestra Summer Youth Ensemble, the Disneyland Collegiate All Star band, of which he beat out drummers from 100 colleges in the nation on the spot, and the Aspen Concert Jazz Ensemble. Jon holds a Bachelor of Music degree from the George Mason University in Virginia. He then went on to get a Master's of Music degree at Howard University in Washington DC.

== Performance ==
Jon Laine has performed with artists including Aretha Franklin, Stevie Wonder, David Foster, Kenny G, Frédéric Yonnet, Black Milk, El DeBarge, Erykah Badu, Angie Stone, Common, Steve Coleman, Meshell Ndegeocello, Dwele, Louie Bellson, Charlie Byrd, Fred Wesley, Frank Wess, Jimmy Heath, Yusef Lateef and was the drummer for Omar's Sing (if you want it) national tour. He also performs with local artists including RPM, Justin Jones, Wes Felton, Muhsinah, Panacea, Alison Carney, Kenny Wesley and SITALI. In 2007 he performed at the Moers jazz festival in Germany and in 2008 at the Sons d'Hiver jazz festival in Paris with Steve Coleman and Opus Akoben. In addition, Laine was the winner of Downbeat Magazine's Student Music award for Best Instrumental Soloist in 2004 for his performance of Max Roach's The Drum Also Waltzes.

== Production ==
Over the years Jon Laine, formerly known as JLaine, has expanded his work to include music production. He has produced for several local acts including Felton (A Dub Supreme, Postcards from the Edge mixtape, The Last Temptation of Wes Felton), DJ Roddy Rod (Take N Stride), Aaron Broadus (All This Love) and Antithesis. Jon Laine made his debut as co-executive producer for veteran singer/songwriter K'Alyn's third LP Verse 1, Chapter 3 alongside his production partner, TFox. Together Jon Laine and TFox are also known as The Wonderboys. Jon Laine founded his own production company FastLaineMusic in which he has released solo material under, including 2 J DIlla tribute albums, APPLE JONS and MIV, VA is for Lovers, and his tribute album to Michael Jackson entitled Naturally Human. His current collaboration project features fellow label mates, TFOX and Wes Felton who go by the name ANTITHESIS. Laine made a song back in 2010 called "Special Lotion", but never released it.

== J Dilla Tribute ==
When J's favorite beat maker and DJ J Dilla passed, he found several ways to coordinate tributes including the J DILLA memorial concert featuring performances by Felton, Raheem DeVaughn, Wayna, Grap Luva, DJ Roddy Rod, Asheru, Cy Young, Phife, Illa J and Dwele. Jon Laine sat as music director for the night which added Dilla's premier group Slum Village as the headliner. To date, Jon Laine has made the Memorial concert an annual event and was hired to direct the performance of the RBMA/XM Dilla Day event at XM studios in Washington DC featuring Pete Rock, Talib Kweli and Maureen Yancey.

== Discography ==
Drumming credits

- 1999 Tengo Ongo Sorry for the Eruption
- 2002 UrbanMinds MindState
- 2003 Aaron Broadus Feels Like The First Time
- 2003 Chris McSwain Quijotesco
- 2003 HUJE IXXI
- 2004 HUJE
- 2005 K'Alyn Verse 1, Chapter 3
- 2005 Miss Lucy Lion A Lion's Grocery List
- 2006 Elisse Perry Share A Moment of Love- (for Hurricane Katrina victims)
- 2008 Wayna Higher Ground
- 2008 Christos Time To Rise
- 2010 Justin Jones & the Driving Rain The Little Fox EP
- 2010 Alex Vans Alex Vans
- 2010 Kokayi Robots and Dinosaurs
- 2011 Oddisee Rock Creek Park
- 2011 Nila Kay Serial Love
- 2013 PL Dates The Power Broker
- 2013 AB Prologue Vo. II
- 2014 Diamond District March on Washington
- 2015 Hezekiah Dreams Don't Chase Themselves
- 2015 Oddisee The Good Fight
- 2016 Oddisee Alwasta
- 2016 Oddisee The Odd Tape
- 2016 Ambassadors Of Morning So Far
- 2016 Carolyn Malachi Rise: Story 1
- 2018 TFOX SPIDERMENDS
- 2020 Nitasha Jackson SQUARE ONE
- 2020 Jon Laine Batteries Not Included
- 2020 Olivier St Louis Runnin Wild'
- 2020 Oddisee Odd Cure

Production Credits

SOLO

- 2007 Apple Jons Tasteful Licks/FastLaine Music
- 2009 The SIX EP Tasteful Licks/FastLaine Music
- 2009 VA is for Lovers Tasteful Licks/FastLaine Music
- 2009 Naturally Human FastLaine Music
- 2010 The Underwear Classix Vol. 7 FastLaine Music
- 2011 MIV FastLaine Music
- 2011 GIANT FastLaine Music/OTB Management
- 2014 Number 9 EP FastLaine Music
- 2019 L A I N E FastLaine Music

Year	Artist	Album	Label
2002	UrbanMinds	MindState	FastLaine Music
2004	The Wonderboys	Music Revelation- Instrumentals Vol. 1	LadyLucy Music
2005	K'Alyn	Verse 1, Chapter 3	Eklectrik Soul
2008	ANTITHESIS	ANTITHESIS	Tasteful Licks records
2008	Roddy Rod/J Laine	Take N Stride/DILLA CAN WIN 7"	FastLaine Music/Humble Monarch/Jazzysport
2009	Wes Felton	Distraction City	Tasteful Licks records
2010	ANTITHESIS	LOVE DAZE	Tasteful Licks records
2010	Wes Felton	Land Of Sheep, Ran By Pigs, Ruled By Wolves	Art!Hurts
2011	Gods'Illa	CPR Blendtape	"NA"
2011	Wes Felton and Jon Laine	For Meshell	"NA"
2011	Nila Kay	Serial Love	FastLaine Music
2011	Labtekwon	Di Na Ko Degg: Soul Power	Ankh Ba records
2013	Stephanie Kristina	The Hour EP	"NA"
2014	J. Sands	The Poet Tree Of Life	Buka Entertainment/BSG Songs
2017	Substantial	The Past is Always Present in the Future	HipNOTT Records
2017	Dave Kline Band	Shifting Borders	Vedamusic
2019	Priest da Nomad	The Manhood Project	Mw2 Entertainment/SPP Waxworks
