= NTG =

NTG may refer to:

- A common abbreviation for Northern Territory Government
- Nitroglycerin, a chemical used in demolition as dynamite and in medicine as a vasodilator
- Methylnitronitrosoguanidine, a carcinogen and a mutagen
- Nils Granlund, the Broadway showman and Loew's Theater publicist Nils Thor Granlund
- Nine Trey Gangsters, an American East Coast street gang and subgroup of the United Blood Nation
- Next Time Gadget, an American electronic musician
- IATA code for Nantong Xingdong Airport, Jiangsu, China
