= Raheem Jarbo =

American rapper (born 1977)

Mega Ran
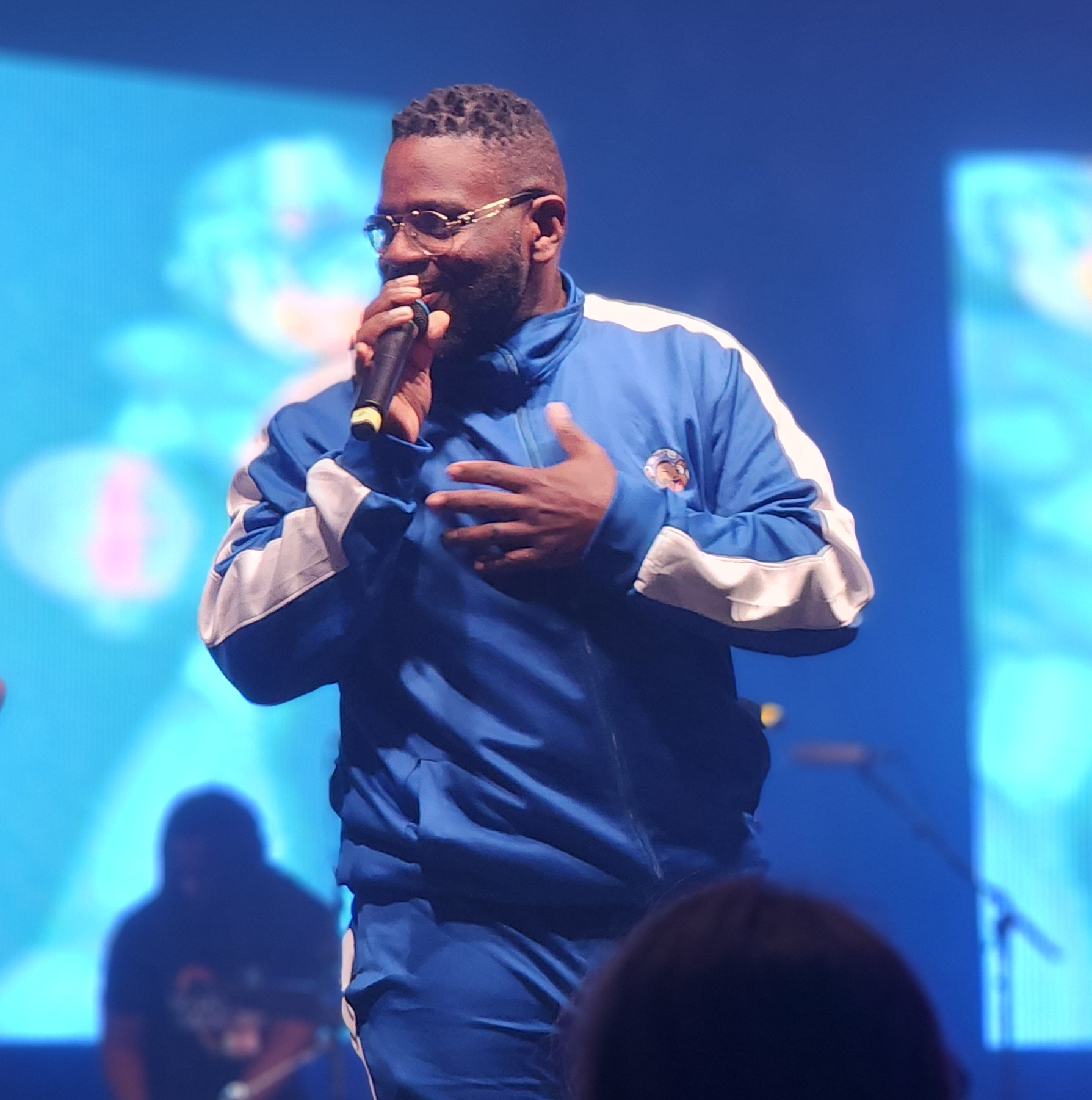
- Jarbo performing as Mega Ran in 2026 at Super MAGFest

Background information
- Also known as: Random, Random Beats
- Born: Philadelphia, Pennsylvania, U.S.
- Genres: Hip-hop, Family music, nerdcore
- Occupations: Rapper, songwriter, record producer, author
- Years active: 2006–present
- Labels: RAHM Nation, River City, SoulSpazm, RandomBeats
- Website: megaran.com

Raheem Jarbo (born September 3, 1977), also known by his stage names Mega Ran and Random, is an American underground nerdcore rapper, chiptune DJ, songwriter, author and record producer.

== Early life ==
Jarbo was born in Philadelphia, Pennsylvania, to an American-born mother and African-born father. He has stated in interviews that he wrote his first song in 1993 and began producing in 2000. After college, Jarbo landed a job as an engineer in a Philadelphia studio, and recorded his first demo. Jarbo resided in Philadelphia until a 2006 move to Phoenix, Arizona.

== Education ==
Jarbo graduated from Martin Luther King High School in Philadelphia, Pennsylvania, and holds a bachelor's degree from Penn State. He has worked full-time as a special education teacher in Philadelphia, then as a middle school teacher in Phoenix, Arizona. Jarbo maintained both a music and teaching career until 2011, when he retired from teaching to focus on music full-time. Jarbo's albums are currently being utilized in coursework at Penn State University and University of Michigan.

Jarbo was the keynote speaker at the 2022 North American Conference on Video Game Music at Louisiana Tech University

== Music ==
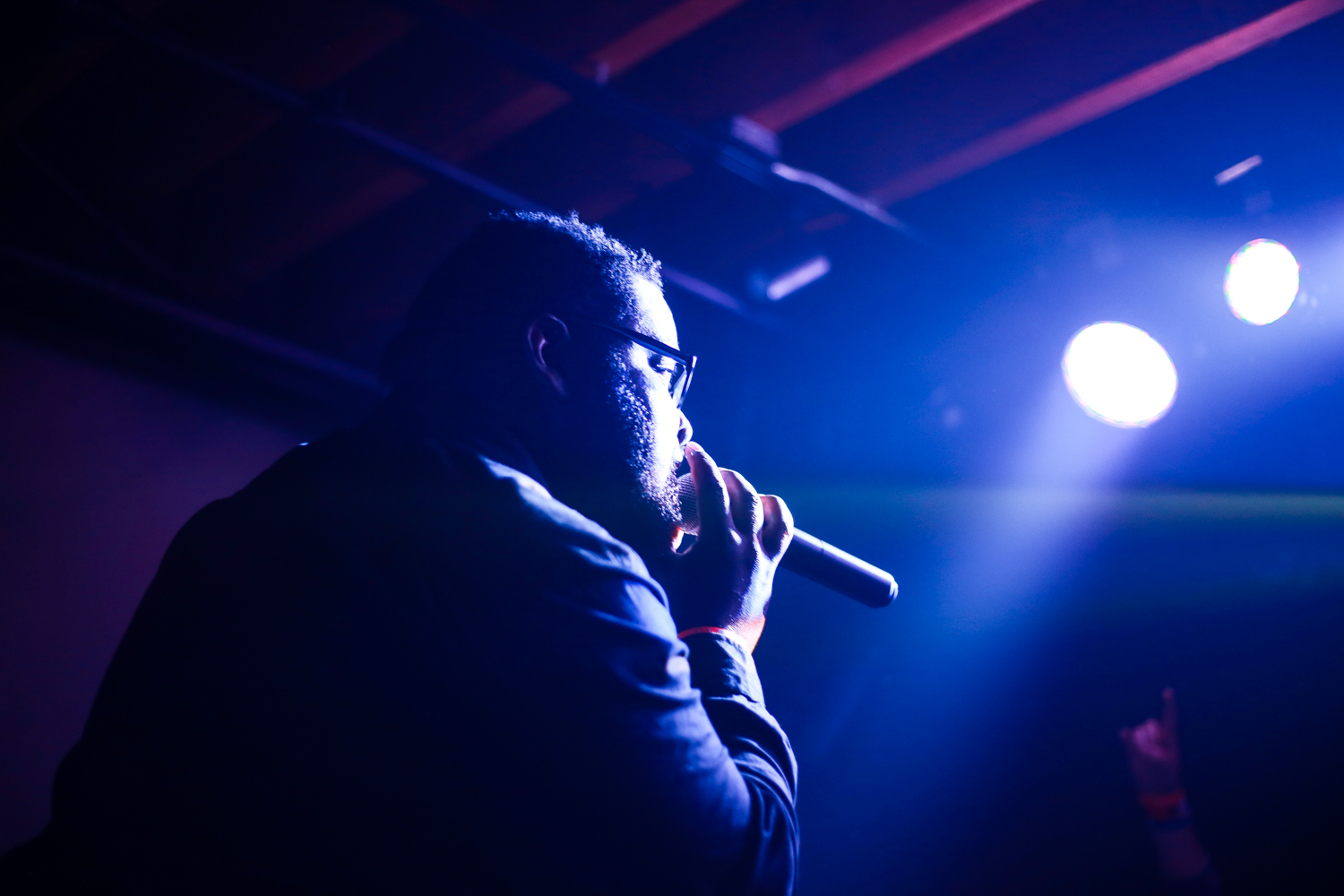
Jarbo performing as Mega Ran at the Knitting Factory in 2016.

Jarbo released his debut album The Call in 2006, but is noted for releasing an album called Mega Ran, a tribute to the Mega Man video game series in 2007. This album landed Jarbo a licensing agreement with video game distributor Capcom and an opportunity to perform at the Capcom booth at San Diego Comic-Con.

This album gained Jarbo a fan base within the nerdcore genre, as well as press coverage by Nintendo Power, IGN, Okayplayer, Complex, Exclaim, and Blender among others.

In 2009, Jarbo released a second Mega Man-based album, Mega Ran 9, based on the PlayStation Network, WiiWare and Xbox Live Arcade video game Mega Man 9. The album was released with the blessing of Capcom.

In 2010, Jarbo collaborated with producer K-Murdock of progressive hip-hop group Panacea and released Forever Famicom, an album containing samples from video games from various publishers on the NES and Super NES consoles.

In 2011, Jarbo created and released Black Materia, an album completely based on the PlayStation and PC game Final Fantasy VII.

In 2012, Jarbo released a remixed version of Black Materia entitled Black Materia: The Remixes. In March, he launched a Kickstarter campaign to release the three-part album, comic book and video game for Mega Ran in Language Arts. The goal was achieved, and Volume One was released in May, Volume Two in August, and Volume Three in November.

In 2013, Jarbo announced he would release one EP per month, titled Time and Space. January, February and March's EP releases were exclusively launched on video game website Destructoid. It was also at this time that Jarbo began referring to his style of music as "Chip-Hop".

In 2013, Jarbo collaborated with New Jersey rapper Mister Wilson and released Blur Bomber, an adaptation of the Archie Comics story arc for the Mega Man and Sonic cross-over in Worlds Collide.

In 2013, Jarbo released "Castlevaniavania: Nocturnal Cantata", a Hip-Hop opera, retelling the story of the classic game "Castlevania: Symphony of the Night". The album cast Jarbo as Alucard, Sammus as Maria Renard and The Ranger as Richter Belmont.

In 2015, Jarbo released his latest album "Soul Veggies" and also toured with Bag of Tricks Cat for the Emerald Knights Tour which included a trip to various UK cities. In Fall of 2015, Jarbo released RNDM, which debuted on the Billboard Top 200 chart.

In February 2015, he changed his stage name to Mega Ran, removing Random from any releases.

In Summer of 2018, Jarbo released "Emerald Knights 2", which debuted on the Billboard Top 200 chart.

In October 2021 Mega Ran released "Live 95," an album dedicated to his love of sport. The album features guests Czarface, Mickey Factz and more. The album was his most successful to date, debuting at number six on the Billboard Top Rap Albums chart.

In 2023 Jarbo released his first children's album, "Buddy's Magic Toy Box." The album debuted at #2 on the Kids Music Billboard 200 charts.

In August 2025, Jarbo featured on Mr. Jeff's album Big Kid Stuff.

In 2025 Jarbo released his second children's album, "Buddy's Magic Tree House." and was nominated for a 2026 Grammy Award for Best Children's Album.

== Video games ==
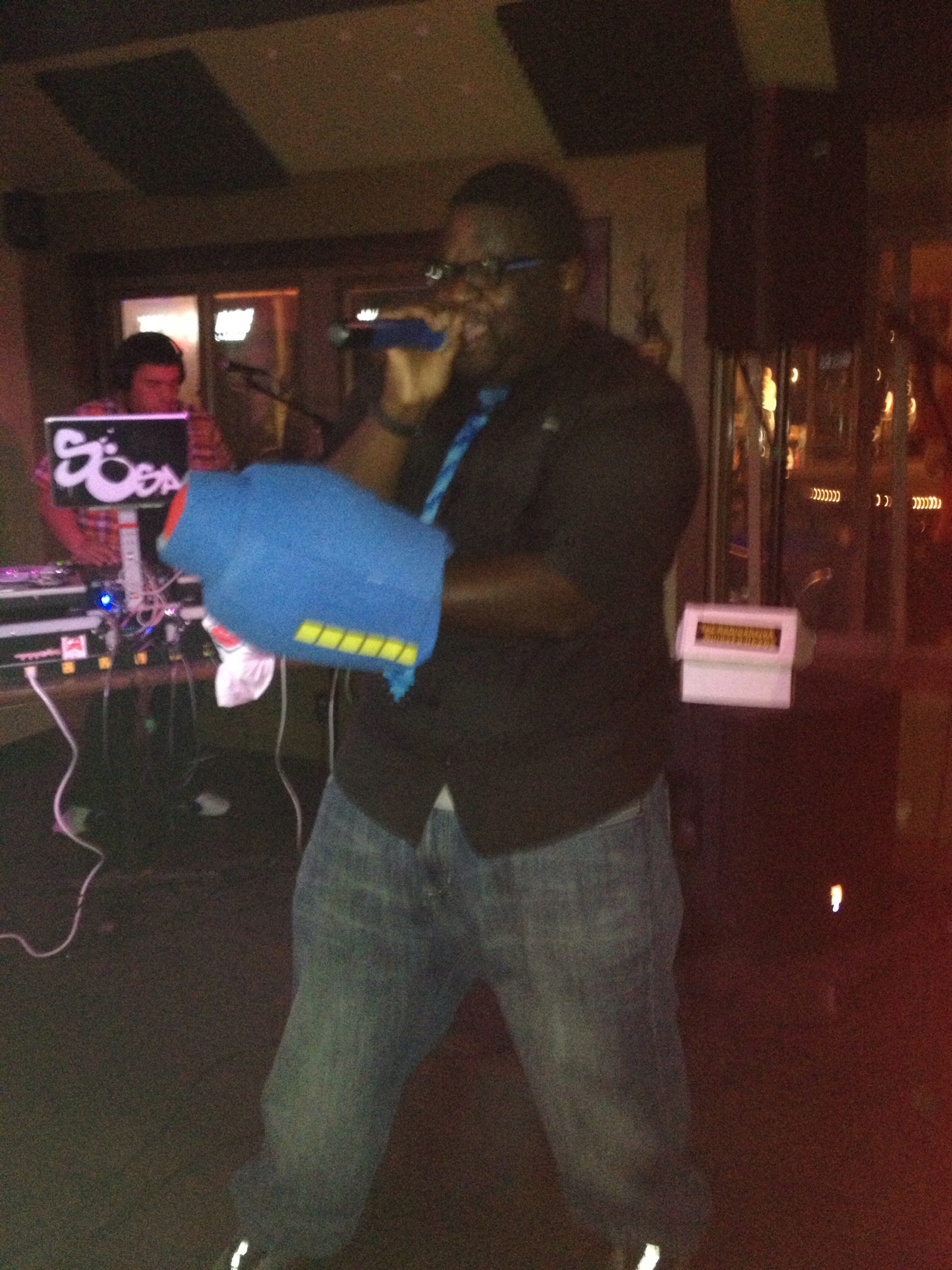
Mega Ran performing at Sabbatical in Indianapolis in 2013

In 2009, Jarbo teamed with Capcom to feature on a hip-hop alternate soundtrack to the hit title Marvel vs. Capcom 2. Jarbo appears on a song entitled "The Remainder Is One". The album is downloadable on PlayStation Network and at Marvel Comics' website.

In 2010 and 2011, Jarbo's music was covered in video game publications Game Developer and Nintendo Power. Jarbo's album based on the game Final Fantasy VII was featured, and was included in the June 2011 issue of Game Informer and PlayStation: The Official Magazine.

In 2012, Jarbo and Chicago-based developers Lunar Giant Studios released the first installment of the Mega Ran video game, loosely based on the album Mega Ran in Language Arts.

In April 2013, Jarbo lent guest vocals to a track on the soundtrack of the award-winning video game Monaco: What's Yours Is Mine called "Welcome to Monaco.

In September 2013, Jarbo and K-Murdock performed at the first ever Halo 4 Global Championships in Seattle. The event was broadcast on Xbox Live and online.

In June 2015, Jarbo announced via YouTube that he had been chosen to perform the ending credits theme for the game Mighty No. 9. His track will appear on his forthcoming album "RNDM" as well.

In 2016, Jarbo published Tales of the Elements on Steam through his label RandomBeats Music. The game was developed by Last Benevolence. Jarbo is one of the main characters and is also playable. The game was released with an album of the same name that followed the storyline. Tales of the Elements – 2nd Chapter was released in 2018 and once again featured Jarbo as one of the main characters.

In June 2019, Jarbo appeared on the official soundtrack of Mortal Kombat 11 with a song called 'Rise' produced by Wilbert Roget.

In June 2022, Jarbo lent guest vocals to Teenage Mutant Ninja Turtles: Shredder's Revenge for the end-credits song, "It's a Pizza Party!", produced by Tee Lopes.

== Film and television ==
Jarbo's song "Grow Up" from the Mega Ran album plays during the end credits of Second Skin, an independent film which debuted at the South by Southwest Film Festival in Austin, Texas, in 2008.

In 2010, Jarbo's song "Splash Woman" played on episodes of TNA IMPACT! and on the ABC special "The Ten Most Fascinating People in America" hosted by Barbara Walters. It has also been featured in the "Aimee" episode of IFC's Portlandia and Comedy Central's Tosh.0.

Jarbo hosted a weekly hip-hop reality show on his YouTube channel called "Life After Lesson Plans". In the final episode he details leaving teaching for music full-time to tour with mc chris.

In February 2012, Jarbo recorded and released a song called "Mega Ran's Jeremy Lin Rap", dedicated to the rise to fame of NBA player Jeremy Lin. The song received 500,000 hits on YouTube, and appeared on the ESPN show SportsCenter.

In August 2014, Glasswork Media released a documentary titled Mega-Lo-Mania chronicling a recent tour by Jarbo. Filmmaker Michael Cardoza traveled alongside Jarbo and soul/funk band The Lo-Classics through three cities to film the documentary.

In July 2017, Jarbo appeared on WWE television as part of a segment on WWE SmackDown Live. He was an extra in a rap battle skit hosted by rapper Wale.

In 2019. he appeared on the ROH/NJPW pro-wrestling event: G1 Supercard, trying to perform his song "Going To the Garden", the official theme song of the event; and having a confrontation against Bully Ray after that. The song was produced by up and coming New Jersey music producer: iLL-Omega.

In 2021 Jarbo wrote a song called "Bow Down" for WWE wrestler Xavier Woods to commemorate his King Of The Ring win. The song debuted on WWE SmackDown Live on November 5, 2021.

In 2025 Mega Ran announced he is featured on the entrance theme music for WWE tag team The New Day. The song "New Day's World" features Jarbo and rapper Sayzee

== Performances ==
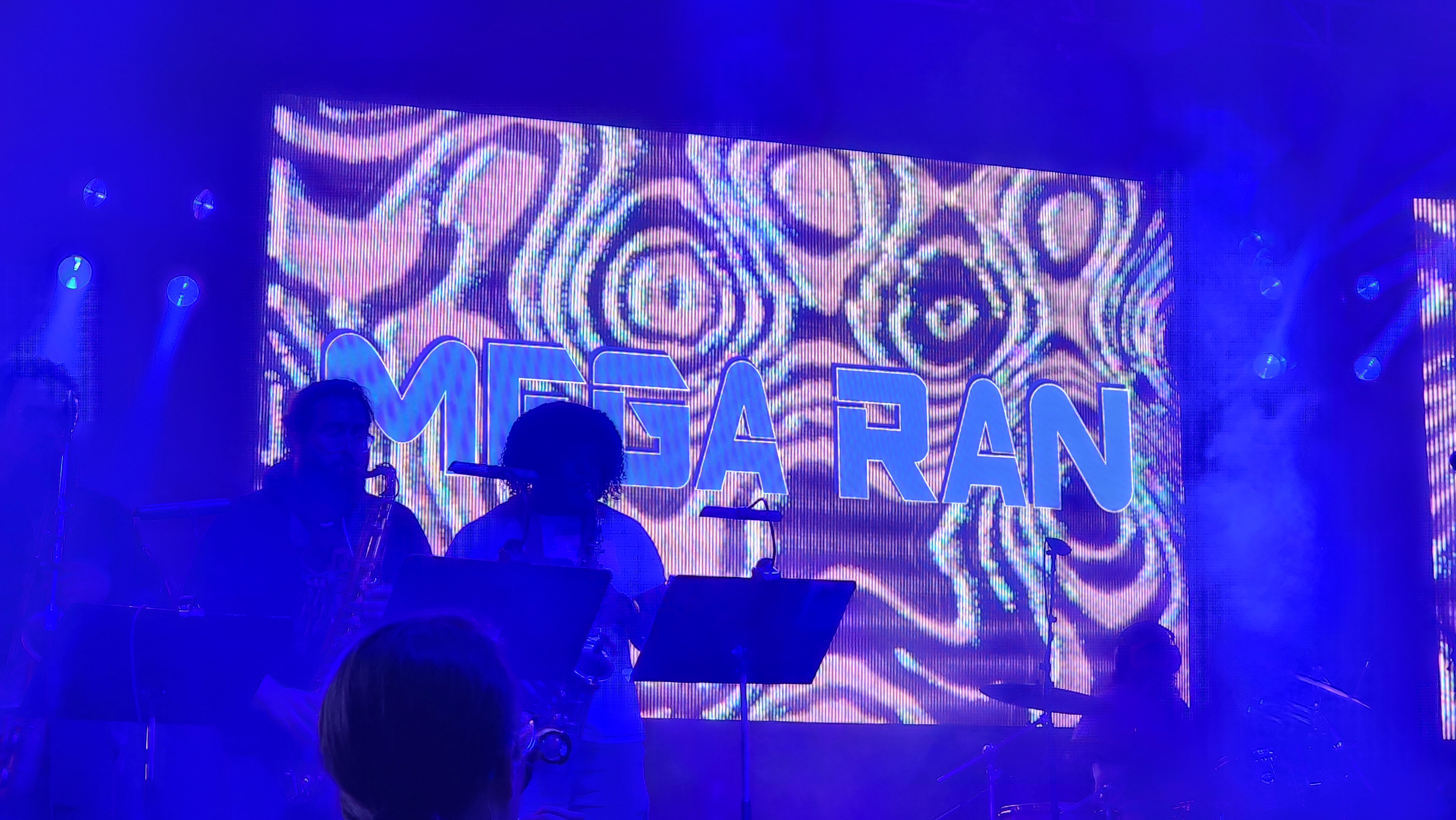
Mega Ran visuals at MAGFest 2026.

Jarbo has toured the U.S. as headliner and as support for MC Chris, MC Lars, Louis Logic, Homeboy Sandman, Open Mike Eagle, and others. He has performed at the SXSW Music Festival in 2008-17 and again in 2022-2024, the Nerdapalooza festival in 2007, 2008, 2010, 2011, 2012, 2013 and 2014, and San Diego Comic-Con 2011–2020. He embarked upon his first European tour in July 2011, and in December 2011, provided support on the More B.A.R.K. Less Bitin' Tour of Japan with DJ Asu Rock, K-Murdock, and jazz-hop artists Substantial and Marcus D. Jarbo returned to Japan after a successful Kickstarter campaign.

Jarbo performed at the Penny Arcade Expo (PAX) most recently in Boston 2024. In 2026, Mega Ran performed at Lollapalooza and is scheduled to play Austin City Limits. He also performed at the east coast's music and gaming festival, MAGfest, in 2014, 2016, 2022 and 2026. In 2023, Jarbo curated his first music festival, The Dream Master Mixtape, at the Red Moon Ale House in Yuma, AZ.

== Personal life ==
Jarbo lives in Phoenix, Arizona with his wife whom he proposed to at MAGfest in 2015. In 2021 he released a memoir entitled Dream Master.

== Discography ==
=== Solo albums ===
- 2001 – Archetype (No Label, CDR)
- 2006 – The Call (RAHM Nation Recordings, LLC)
- 2007 – Mega Ran (RAHM Nation Recordings, LLC)
- 2008 – The 8th Day (RAHM Nation Recordings, LLC)
- 2009 – Mega Ran 9 (RAHM Nation, Capcom)
- 2011 – Black Materia: Final Fantasy VII (with Lost Perception)
- 2012 – Mega Ran in Language Arts (RandomBeats Music)
- 2015 – RNDM (RandomBeats Music)
- 2017 – Extra Credit (RandomBeats Music)
- 2018 – The Visitor (SoulSpazm Records)
- 2021 – Live ‘95 (RandomBeats Music / Needlejuice Records)
- 2023 - Wrestling is Real, People Are Fake (RandomBeats Music)
- 2023 - Buddy's Magic Toy Box (RandomBeats Music / Needlejuice Records)
- 2025 - Buddy's Magic Tree House (RandomBeats Music / Needlejuice Records)

=== Collaborative projects ===
- 2010 – Forever Famicom with K-Murdock (Neosonic Productions)
- 2011 – The Memorandum (with Mr. Miranda) Random Beats Music
- 2011 – Forever Famicom: DLC with K-Murdock (Neosonic Productions)
- 2012 – The Ghouls 'n Ghosts EP (with Richie Branson)
- 2013 – Blur Bomber (with Mister Wilson)
- 2013 – Ghouls 'n Ghosts 2 (with Richie Branson)
- 2014 – Forever Famicom: DLC 3 with K-Murdock
- 2015 – Soul Veggies (with Storyville) (Brick Records)
- 2015 - Ghouls 'n Ghosts 3: The Nightmare Before Christmas (with Richie Branson)
- 2015 - Emerald Knights: The Album (with Bag of Tricks Cat)
- 2017 – Emerald Knights 2 (with Bag of Tricks Cat) (Random Beats / Respect The Underground)
- 2019 - The Dewey Decibel System (with MC Lars) (Horris Records / Needlejuice Records)
- 2020 – 2 Hands Up (with Young RJ of Slum Village (Ne'Astra Records)
- 2020 - Ghouls 'n Ghosts 4 (with Richie Branson and Kadesh Flow)

=== EPs ===
- 2005 – Fundamentals EP
- 2008 – Patches and Glue (RAHM Nation Recordings, LLC)
- 2012 – River City Random (self-released)
- 2013 – Castlevania: The Nocturnal Cantata (Joypad Records)
- 2013 – TRAP (self-released)
- 2014 – A Gamer's Anthem (with The Regiment Hip-Hop Duo) (HiPNOTT Records)
- 2017 – Notorious RAN: Ready to Live (self-released)
- 2017 – Strangers (self-released)

=== Mixtapes and limited releases ===
- 2006 – The Call: The Remix Tape
- 2009 – Randomonium (Japan only)
- 2009 – TeacherRapperHero: The Random Mixtape
- 2010 – Heroes, Volume One
- 2011 – TeacherRapperHero Vol. 2: Two Weeks Notice
- 2011 – Mega Ran 10
- 2011 – A Very Random Christmas
- 2012 – Black Materia: The Remixes
- 2014 – TRAP 2 (self-released)
- 2014 – The Call: 8 Bit Anniversary Edition

=== Guest appearances ===
- 2005 – "Beats & Rhymes" on The Chancellor (RAHM Nation Recordings, LLC)
- 2007 – "Gnosis" & "Faculty Meeting" on Legend of … The Chancellor (RAHM Nation Recordings, LLC)
- 2007 – "No Grudge" on Nina Simone by … Ohene (RAHM Nation Recordings, LLC)
- 2008 – "Black Box" by MC Frontalot on "Final Boss" (Level Up/Nerdcore Fervor)
- 2008 – "Don't Look Back" on Escape Plan (Deep Scene Productions)
- 2008 – "Grown" on American Scholar (RAHM Nation Recordings, LLC)
- 2009 – "The Remainder is One" on Marvel vs. Capcom Mixtape (Capcom)
- 2010 – "To Whom Much is Given" on Back and Forth (Koyto Mixtapes)
- 2010 – "Dustman" by 7L & Esoteric on "Fly Casualties"
- 2010 - "Online Girls" by The Ranger on "The Cook Up" (Scrub Club Records)
- 2011 – "Me and the Mouse" by MC Lars on "Indie Rocket Science" (Horris Records)
- 2011 – "Easy Mode (Remix)" by Kabuto The Python on "The Kvetch Sessions: I Hate Everything" (Scrubclub Records)
- 2012 – "The Tell Tale <3" by MC Lars on "The Edgar Allan Poe EP" (Horris Records)
- 2012 – "Play It By Ear" on "Gigantic, Vol 1" by Small Pro (Diamond Music Group)
- 2012 – "The Promise ft. MegaRan (Halo 4 Remix)" by "Dj CUTMAN" (Halo 4 Soundtrack Remix contest)
- 2012 – "The Blues ft. Mega Ran" by Marcus D on "Retro'd"
- 2013 – "Game Over" by SkyBlew (self-released)
- 2013 – "Big Kid Remix" by Doug Funnie
- 2013 – "Jazzy NYC" by Mister Wilson on The Mister Wilson Show
- 2013 – "Blurred Lines Freestyle" by Mister Wilson on The Mister Wilson Show
- 2014 – "World 3-8 – Smash Bros" by Creative Mind Frame (a.k.a. "1-UP") on Nerdcore Emulation Station (NES)
- 2014 – "Outsiders" by Mikal kHill on The Snuggle is Real (self-released)
- 2014 – "Plight of the Shoobies" by Skyblew on Skyblew's UNModern Life (Random Beats Music)
- 2014 – "Space Marines" by The Extremities on "Instruments" (Self Released)
- 2015 – "Idea Junkies" by Backburner on "Eclipse" (Backburner Recordings)
- 2015 – "Warp Formula" by Wordburglar on "Rapplicable Skills" (Hand'Solo Records)
- 2016 – "Side-Scrolling Hero" by Boy Meets Robot on "The Robots Will Kill Us All" (self-released)
- 2018 - "Impossible War" by Tryhardninja on "Video Game Songs, Vol. 5" (self-released)
- 2018 – "Drones" by Teenburger on "Hivemind" (Science)
- 2018 – "Ness's Nightmare" by Super Soul Bros on "Motherlode"
- 2019 – "Put It Down" by Rav & Kill Bill: The Rapper on "New Moon"
- 2020 - "Shonen Jump Cypher 2" by Rustage (self-released)
- 2024 - "First Day Out" by Bear McCreary on album "The Singularity"
- 2024 - "Kratos vs Maui" by Freshy Kanal (self-released)
- 2024 - "Don't Leave Me" by COOLETHAN on "You Can Never Go Back"

== Bibliography ==
- Jarbo, Raheem (2020). Dream Master: From the Stoop to the Stage to the Stars. Authorhouse. ISBN 978-1665509930.
