= Kenny Wesley =

American songwriter

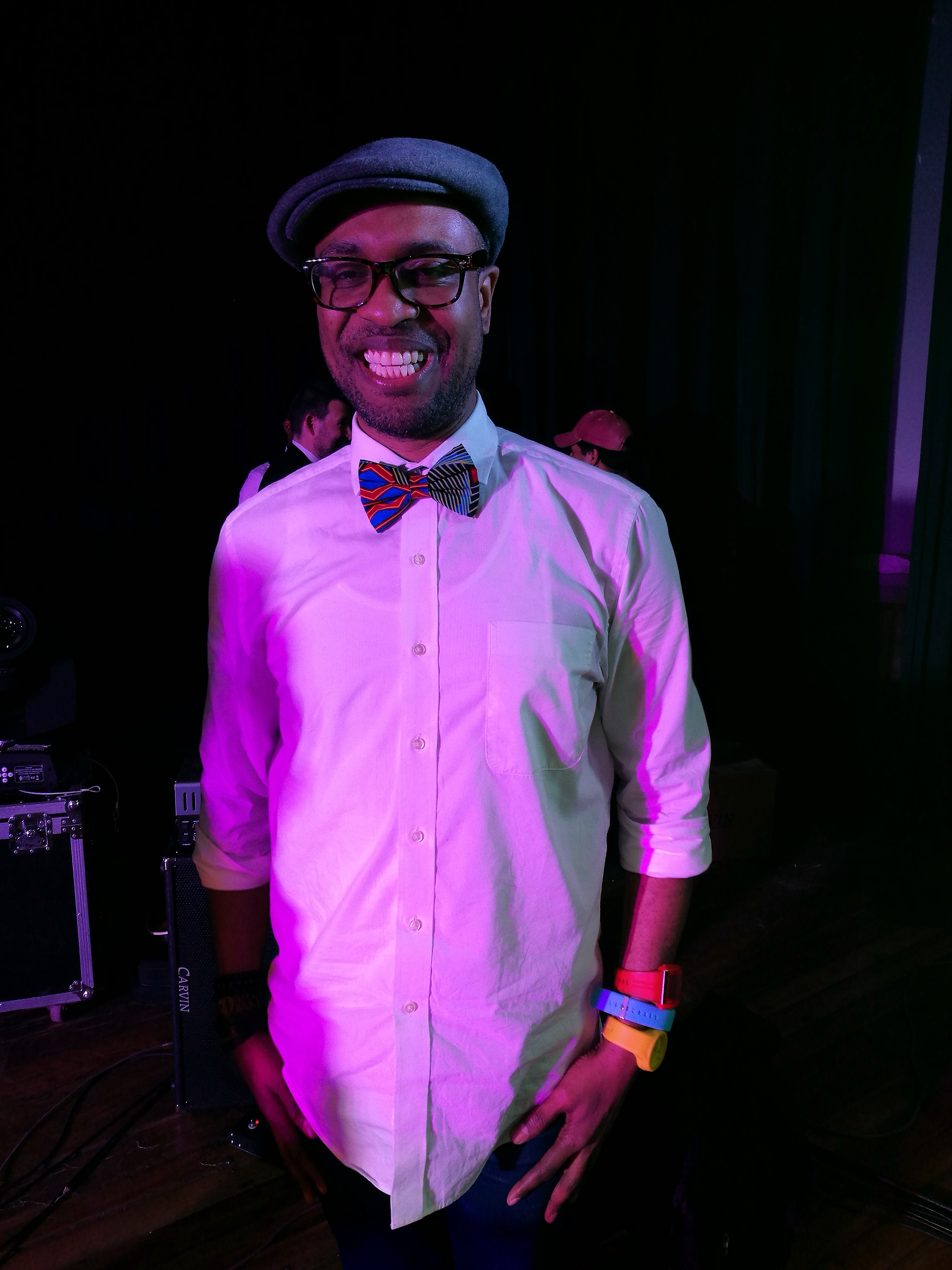
- Wesley in 2017

Background information
- Also known as: The Soulful Nerd
- Born: Kenny Devone Wesley; Honolulu, Hawaii, United States
- Origin: Jacksonville, North Carolina, United States
- Genres: Funktronica, Funk, Synthpop, Soul, Jazz, Nu-disco, Classical, Alternative
- Occupations: Singer, record producer, pianist, songwriter
- Years active: 2004–present
- Label: Unsigned/Wright Brother Music/Stereo Lif Records
- Website: SoulfulNerd.com

Kenny Wesley (also known as The Soulful Nerd) is a singer, songwriter and classically trained multi-instrumentalist based in Berlin, Germany.

== Early life ==
=== Musical Training ===
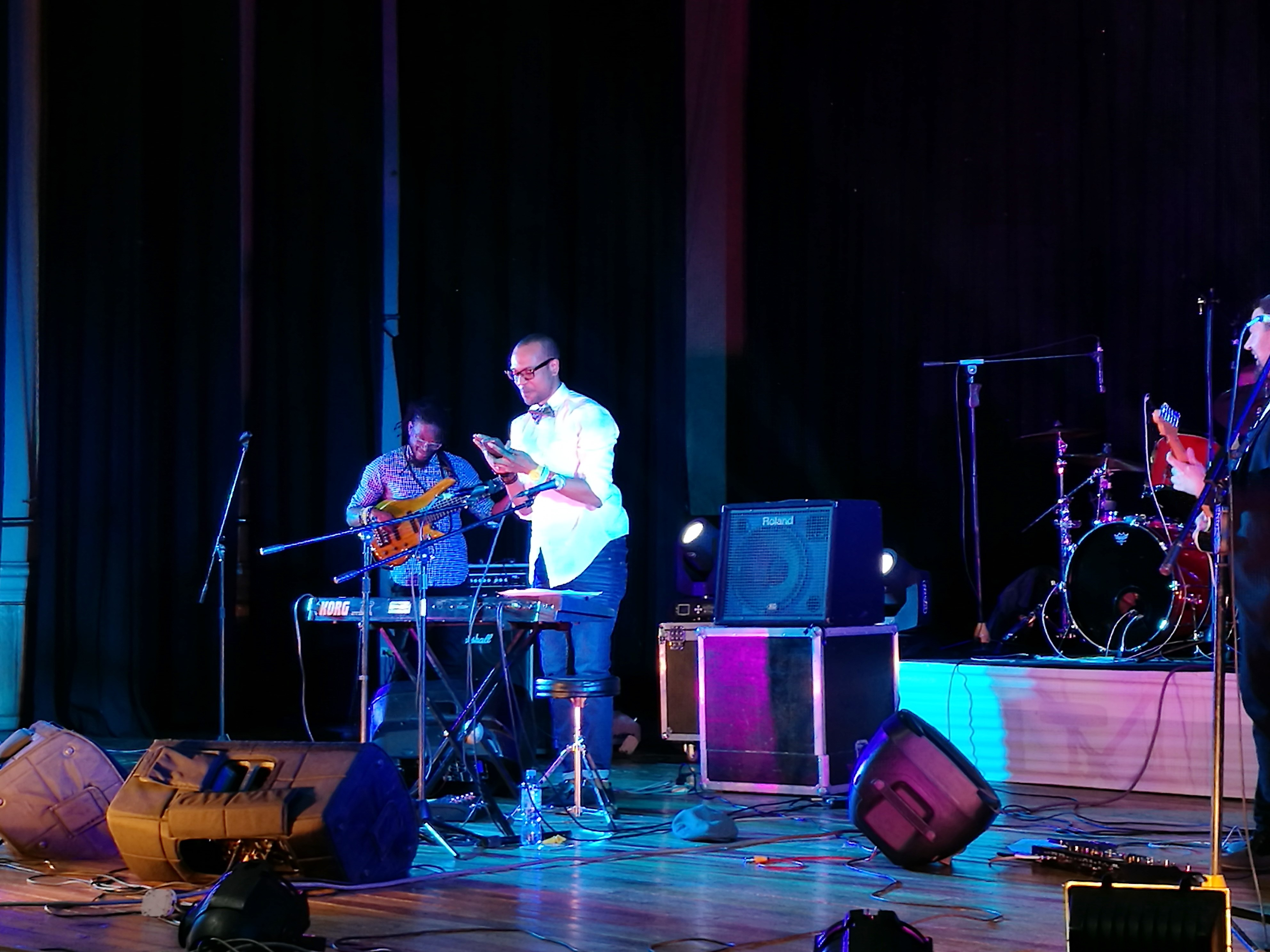
Kenny Wesley in concert in Cajamarca January 2017

Wesley was born on a military base to military parents in Honolulu, Hawaii and grew up in Jacksonville, North Carolina.

He started singing before while still learning to speak as a young toddler and learned the fundamentals of singing early on from his mother, a trained choral singer. His parents noticed his interest in music and put him in piano lessons at age 7. By age 9 he was playing on a professional level and began accompanying his local church choir. At age 11 he started studying the trumpet in the school band and later moved to the euphonium and was selected for the North Carolina All-District Band multiple times. His high school band director, Fletcher Stubbs, upon observing Kenny's piano skills, encouraged him to be the pianist for the school's jazz band. Under Stubbs tutelage, he learned to read and teach from orchestral scores – which would serve useful when he became the drum major of the marching band.

=== Howard University ===
Wesley speaks five languages (English, French, Spanish, German, and French Creole), is a former medical interpreter and lecturer of Spanish and French at Howard University, his alma mater. While an undergraduate at Howard, he took private voice lessons and worked as a rehearsal pianist and accompanist for multiple choral groups on the campus. He was a member of the renowned Howard University Chorale under the direction of James Weldon Norris, as well as the Howard University Rankin Chapel Choir, then under the direction of famed choral conductor and original director of the Howard University Gospel Choir, Arphelius Paul Gatling. He would later go on to sing with Gatling's choral ensemble, P.A.U.L. His classmates included Muhsinah, various members of Afro Blue (from NBC's The Sing-Off), Lance Gross, James Brandon Lewis, Cora Coleman-Dunham, and Rhodes scholar, Marianna Ofosu.

== Mainstream Musical career ==
=== Background Vocalist ===
He has performed as a background vocalist with various recording artists including Grammy-award winning singer-songwriter Gordon Chambers, Angela Johnson (formerly of Cooly's Hotbox), Syleena Johnson (of TV One's R&B Divas: Atlanta), Anthony David, Conya Doss, Deborah Bond, Maya Azucena, and Grammy-nominated Contemporary Jazz singer and former lead singer of Incognito, Maysa Leak. Kenny was a translator and French accent coach for the tune "Sophisticated Lover" from Leak's 2013 album, Blue Velvet Soul.

=== I'm Sorry, Freedom, The Real Thing ===
Kenny's debut project, I'm Sorry (EP), was self-released in 2008 on his independent label, Wright Brother Records. It sold in excess of 3,000 copies in the Washington, D.C. and New York City markets primarily from sales at live concerts.

In July 2011, Kenny teamed up with Washington, D.C.-based musician/producers Matthew Shell and Trey Eley on a remake of Michael Jackson's "Rock with You" for their album Freedom which proved to be a move in the right direction. Their remake garnered a great deal of mainstream media attention, and radio stations across the country began putting the tune into rotation without their knowledge (including Sirius XM's Watercolors). The promo video for the album, prominently featuring Kenny's in-studio performance of "Rock with You", was featured by Grammy.com in September 2012. and was nominated for a Hollywood Music and Media award.

Later that year, Grammy-nominated TV/Film music producer and arranger, Noah Lifschey found Kenny's music via LinkedIn and they immediately began collaborating writing and recording the singles that would eventually become Kenny's debut full-length CD, The Real Thing. In 2012, Lifschey introduced Kenny to Spanish indie pop band The Pinker Tones resulting in the remix of "Feels Good" from The Real Thing.

Released in 2013, The Real Thing was well received by critics and featured an all-star lineup of cameos including Grammy-nominated vocalist Wayna, DJ Kid Koala, Butterscotch (from America's Got Talent), guitarist Chris Bruce (Me'shell Ndegeocello, India.Arie, Seal, Sheryl Crow), and bassist Dan Lutz (Sheila E., BeBe Winans, Gladys Knight, Jonathan Butler).

=== Television ===
Kenny and co-writer Timothy Butler, submitted a song and accompanying music video in 2004 for ABC series The View's Original Theme Song Competition. They were selected as finalists and their music video aired on the series later that summer. In 2012, his tune, "Won't Let It Go" co-written and produced by Lifschey, was prominently featured on season 9 of FOX's So You Think You Can Dance during the audition of performer David Matz. In 2013, their tune, "Damaged Goods" was featured on season 10 of the series.

=== Recent career ===
In 2013, Wesley collaborated with Wes Felton, on a number of Felton's releases including Hesomiso, Land of Sheep, Ran by Pigs, Run by Wolves, and the K'Alyn produced, Imagine the Future.

In the same year, he was one of fifteen vocalists (and the only American) selected for the Montreux Jazz Festival's annual Shure Vocal Competition, under the patronage of the legendary Quincy Jones. He would go on to be a finalist and win the 2nd prize (ex-aequo with Anastasiya Volokitina).

== Discography ==
=== Studio albums ===
- The Real Thing (2013)
- The Real Thing, Japan Release (2014)

=== Remixed singles ===
- Feels Good [Pinker Tones Remix] (2012)
- The Window [Mr. Robot Remix] (2012)
- The Window [MTS Remix] (2012)
- Rock with You [Luv Dlux Remix] (2012)

=== Singles ===
- Kenny Wesley – Sorry (2008)
- Kenny Wesley – Serenity (2008)
- Kenny Wesley – Have Yourself a Merry Little Christmas (2008)
- DJ Speak Greene featuring Kenny Wesley & Kev.O – All an Illusion (2009)
- Kenny Wesley – The Window (2011)
- 76 Degrees West Band featuring Ronald Payton & Kenny Wesley – Shining Star (2011)
- Kenny Wesley – Won't Let It Go (2012)
- Kenny Wesley feat. Carlton Hicks – Toyland (2012)
- Kenny Wesley – Damaged Goods (2013)

=== EPs ===
- I'm Sorry (2008)

=== Compilations ===
- Various – Holiday Magic CD Compilation (2008)
- Various – A Taste of HipNOTT Sampler 2009 (2009)
- DJ Conscience – Soulbounce.com Presents: A R.E.D. SOUL, True Story (2010)
- Various – 2010 Kemp Mill Kool Kats CD Compilation (2010)
- Various – The Contemporary Songbook 3 (2010)
- Various – 111 East Nu Soul – After Dark, Vol. 1 (2010)

=== Collaborations ===
- Kebomusic – The Soul Prototype (2010)
- Green Tea Beautiful Weirdo (2010)
- Wes Felton – Land of Sheep, Ran by pigs, Run by Wolves (2010)
- Wes Felton – Hesomiso (2011)
- Maimouna Youssef – The Blooming (2011)
- Green Tea – A Time to B.E. (2012)
- Trey Eley & Matthew Shell – Freedom (2012)
- Kim Jordan – Uncommon (2012)
- Kebomusic – The Experience (2013)
- Teisha Marie – The Girl From Nowhere (2013)
- Wes Felton – Imagine the Future (2013)
- Mycah Chevalier – When I Give My Love to You (2014)

== Awards ==
- Washington Area Music Award: Urban Contemporary Vocalist (nominee), 2012
- Washington Area Music Award: Song of the Year (nominee), 2013
- Washington Area Music Award: Urban Contemporary Vocalist (nominee), 2013
- Shure Montreux Jazz Vocal Competition (2nd Prize), 2013
- Washington Area Music Award: Urban Contemporary Vocalist (nominee), 2014
- Washington Area Music Award: Urban Contemporary Album (nominee), 2014
- Washington Area Music Award: Record Design (nominee), 2014
- Washington Area Music Award: Song of The Year (nominee), 2014
- Washington Area Music Award: WAMA/SAW Songwriter of the Year (nominee), 2014
- Washington Area Music Award: Album of the Year (nominee), 2014
- Washington Area Music Award: Urban Contemporary Vocalist (winner), 2015
- Washington Area Music Award: Urban Contemporary Recording (winner), 2015
