= Kristyles =

Studio album by KRS-One
- Released: June 24, 2003
- Recorded: late 2002–early 2003
- Genre: Hip hop
- Length: 55:31
- Label: Koch
- Producers: Simone Parker (exec.); Choco; Da Beatminerz; DJ Revolution; DJ Tiné Tim; Gato; Ghetto Professionals; Inebriated Beats; Kenny Parker; KRS-One

KRS-One chronology
The Mix Tape (2002)	Kristyles (2003)	D.I.G.I.T.A.L. (2003)

Singles from Kristyles
- 1. "Underground" Released: May 20, 2003; 2. "How Bad Do You Want It" Released: July 2003

Professional ratings
Review scores
Source	Rating
laut.de	4/5 stars
No Ripcord	7/10
RapReviews	9/10
The New Rolling Stone Album Guide	3/5 stars

Kristyles is the sixth solo studio album by American rapper and record producer KRS-One. It was released on June 24, 2003, through Koch Records. Production was handled by DJ Tiné Tim, Da Beatminerz, Choco, DJ Revolution, Gato, Inebriated Beats, Kenny Parker, the Ghetto Professionals, and KRS-One himself. It features guest appearances from Peedo and Tekitha. The album peaked at number 186 on the Billboard 200, number 30 on the Top R&B/Hip-Hop Albums, and number 10 on the Independent Albums in the United States. It spawned two singles: "Underground" and "How Bad Do You Want It". The latter appeared on 2004 album KRS-ONE Presents Peedo & The Luna Empire.

According to KRS-One, the record was released without his consent by Koch. The title that KRS-One wanted for the record was The Kristyle, an acronym for the phrase "To have everything, keep radiating in spirit through your love everyday."

"They don't have the full album," KRS explained. "They have stuff that I wasn't even putting on the album. I have no idea what's on the album [Koch put together]. I don't know what the artwork looks like, I don't know what the album credits look like, I don't know nothing. What they did was go behind my back and release the album. I got word just in the nick of time last week. I got my legal team together and we slapped them with a court order to cease the distribution and the pressing and manufacturing of this album."

== Track listing ==
No.	Title	Writer(s)	Producer(s)	Length
1.	"Warning: Intro"			0:13
2.	"Do You Got It"	Tine E Tim	DJ Tiné Tim	1:42
3.	"Ya Feel Dat"	Tine E Tim	DJ Tiné Tim	3:44
4.	"Underground"	Lawrence Parker; Walter Dewgarde; Ewart Dewgarde	Da Beatminerz	4:12
5.	"How Bad Do You Want It" (featuring Peedo)	Parker; Jose Luna; Gato Luna	Gato	3:46
6.	"Ain't the Same"	Parker; Mike Heron; Victor Padilla; J. Ortiz	Ghetto Pros	3:14
7.	"It's All a Struggle"	Parker; Heron; Padilla; Ortiz	Ghetto Pros	2:28
8.	"What Else Happened"	Tine E Tim	DJ Tiné Tim	1:31
9.	"Somebody"	Parker; W. Dewgarde	Da Beatminerz	3:55
10.	"Survivin'" (featuring Tekitha Priest Forever and Shuman)	Parker; Priest Forever; Tekitha Washington	KRS-One; Choco	4:13
11.	"Things Will Change"	Parker; Kurt Hoffman	DJ Revolution	4:22
12.	"The Movement (featuring Priest Forever)"	Parker; Priest Forever; W. Dewgarde	Da Beatminerz	3:16
13.	"Gunnen' Em Down"	Parker	KRS-One; Choco	3:36
14.	"Philosophical"	Tine E Tim	DJ Tiné Tim	3:14
15.	"9 Elements"	Parker; Hoffman	DJ Revolution	3:38
16.	"Alright With Me"	Parker	Kenny Parker	3:35
17.	"The Only One"	Parker	Inebriated Beats	4:52
Total length:				55:31

Note

- The song "Ya Feel Dat" did not appear on some versions of the album.

== Personnel ==
- Lawrence "KRS-One" Parker – main artist, producer (tracks: 10, 13)
- Peedo – featured artist (track 5)
- Priest Forever – featured artist (tracks: 10, 12)
- Tekitha Washington – featured artist (track 10)
- DJ Tiné Tim – producer (tracks: 2, 3, 8, 14)
- Walter "Mr. Walt" Dewgarde – producer (tracks: 4, 9, 12)
- Ewart "DJ Evil Dee" Dewgarde – producer (track 4)
- Gato Luna – producer (track 5)
- Mike "Heron" Herald – producer (tracks: 6, 7)
- Victor "V.I.C." Padilla – producer (tracks: 6, 7)
- Choco – producer (tracks: 10, 13), mixing (tracks: 1–11, 13–15, 17)
- Kurt "DJ Revolution" Hoffman – producer (tracks: 11, 15), mixing (tracks: 12, 16)
- DJ Kenny Parker – producer (track 16)
- Inebriated Beats – producer (track 17)
- Cliff Cultreri – mastering
- Simone Parker – executive producer
- Jeff Gilligan – design

== Charts ==
Chart (2003)	Peak position
US Billboard 200	186
US Top R&B/Hip-Hop Albums (Billboard)	30
US Independent Albums (Billboard)	10
