= Smoke and Mirrors (O.C. album) =

Studio album by O.C.
- Released: November 1, 2005
- Genre: Hip-hop
- Length: 76:15
- Label: Hieroglyphics Imperium Recordings
- Producer: Mike Loe; Fyre Dept.; Mr. Dave; Roc-Steady

O.C. chronology
Starchild (2005)	Smoke and Mirrors (2005)	Hidden Gems (2007)

Smoke and Mirrors is a studio album by American rapper O.C. of the D.I.T.C. crew. It was released on Hieroglyphics Imperium Recordings on November 1, 2005.

== Critical reception ==
Professional ratings
Review scores
Source	Rating
AllMusic	favorable
IGN	7.0/10
PopMatters	6/10 stars
RapReviews.com	5.5/10
Stylus Magazine	C

Jim Durig of IGN wrote, "'My Way' is indicative of the album's lyrical edge, touting that O.C. is 'still tougher than your illest rap adolescent' over a blend of sharp strings and frantic, piercing keys." Dave Heaton of PopMatters commented that "Somehow the most retro songs on the album end up sounding the freshest, proving that maybe O.C. is as complicated as he claims to be."

== Track listing ==
All tracks are written by O. Credle and W.M. Warren, except where noted.

No.	Title	Writer(s)	Producer(s)	Length
1.	"Intro: Smoke and Mirrors"		Mike Loe	1:03
2.	"You Made Me"		Mike Loe	4:10
3.	"Martyr"		Mike Loe	4:47
4.	"My Way"		Mike Loe	4:13
5.	"Emotions"		Mike Loe	4:04
6.	"Distortion"		Mike Loe	3:12
7.	"Going Nowhere"		Mike Loe	4:13
8.	"Young World"		Mike Loe	2:19
9.	"Gone"		Mike Loe	5:08
10.	"The Good, the Bad, the Ugly"		Mike Loe	3:25
11.	"Guns and Butter"		Mike Loe	3:42
12.	"I'm da Boss"	O. Credle; E. Krasno; A. Deitch	Fyre Dept.	3:59
13.	"Challenge Y'all"		Mike Loe	3:58
14.	"Brother's Keeper"		Mike Loe	4:51
15.	"What I Need"		Mike Loe	4:15
16.	"Shorty"		Mike Loe	3:37
17.	"This Is Me"		Mike Loe	4:02
18.	"Coldwaxa Speaks"	Coldwaxa	Mr. Dave; Roc-Steady	9:18
Total length:				76:15

== Personnel ==
Credits adapted from the CD edition's liner notes.

- O.C. – vocals
- Mike Loe – production (1–11, 13–17), recording (1–11, 13–17)
- Fyre Dept. – production (12)
- Rashawn Ross – trumpet (12)
- Eric Krasno – guitar (12)
- Eric Coomes – bass guitar (12)
- Adam Deitch – drums (12), keyboards (12)
- Ramon – recording (12), mixing (1–17)
- Mr. Dave – production (18)
- Roc-Steady – production (18)
- Lamonte – recording (18)
- Kasim – mixing (18)
- Craig Salmon – photography
- Jireh Hinton – design
- Sam Wilson – additional design
