= Freedom (Trey Eley & Matthew Shell album) =

Studio album by Trey Eley & Matthew Shell
- Recorded: 2012
- Genres: Jazz, crossover jazz
- Length: 48:47
- Label: Working Notion Entertainment

Freedom is an instrumental jazz album which was a collaboration between flautist Trey Eley and producer Matthew Shell. It was released on August 30, 2012. The track from the album, Twilight, featuring Grammy nominated trumpet player Greg Adams was featured on Grammy.com as an Exclusive First listen. Another track "Beauty in Freedom", inspired Grammy nominated artist, Carolyn Malachi to write her song Beautiful Dreamer. The album was also featured as one of Generation bass' Top album of 2012. The video reinterpretation of the Michael Jackson track, "Rock with you" featuring Kenny Wesley was shot and edited by Jason Baustin, of Travestee Films. The music video for "Juice" features the dancer Atomic Goofball, who also performed in So You Think You Can Dance and the film Step Up 3.

== Track listing ==
| No. | Title | Writer(s) | Producer(s) | Length |
|---|---|---|---|---|
| 1. | "Beauty in Freedom" | Matthew Shell, Darrick Atwater | Matthew Shell, Darick Atwater | 10:07 |
| 2. | "Juice (feat. G.P. Jackson)" | Matthew Shell | Matthew Shell | 2:59 |
| 3. | "Twilight (feat. Greg Adams)" | Matthew Shell | Matthew Shell | 3:49 |
| 4. | "Faces of Change" | Matthew Shell | Matthew Shell | 3:56 |
| 5. | "5.8" | Trey Eley | Trey Eley | 5:50 |
| 6. | "Alright Now (feat. Marcus Mitchell)" | Matthew Shell, Marcus Singleton | Matthew Shell, Marcus Singleton | 3:37 |
| 7. | "Hidden Within" | Matthew Shell | Matthew Shell, Jonathan Quigley | 2:15 |
| 8. | "Rich Mahogany" | Matthew Shell | Matthew Shell | 3:13 |
| 9. | "Coming To You" | Marcus Singleton, Matthew Shell | Matthew Shell | 5:17 |
| 10. | "Thinking About You" | Matthew Shell, Rob Mercer | Matthew Shell | 3:28 |
| 11. | "Rock With You (feat. Kenny Wesley)" | Rod Temperton | Matthew Shell, Trey Eley | 4:16 |

== Personnel ==
Following are the credits for all the personnel involved:

- Trey Eley - Primary Artist, Composer, Flute, Alto Flute, Wind Synthesizer
- Matthew Shell - Primary Artist, Composer, Engineer, Arranger, Producer, Guitars, Drums, Additional instrumentation
- Vahagn Stepanyan - Piano
- Devin Spear - Electric Guitar on "Beauty in Freedom"
- Darrick Atwater - Producer, Engineer, Mix assistance, Additional Arrangement
- Markus Huber - Bass on "Beauty in Freedom", ""Faces of Change", "Hidden Within", "Rock with You"
- Mike Gamble - Bass on "Twilight"
- Mr.Turner - Bass on "Juice", "5.8"
- Jabari Exum - Djembe on "Beauty in Freedom"
- Kolten Perine - Keyboard, synthesizers on "Faces of Change"
- Cristina Botnari - Violin on "Twilight"
- Marcus Singleton - Producer, Additional instrumentation, Synthesizers, Arrangement on "Coming to you"
- Jonathan Quigley - Producer, Beatbox, Additional Arrangement on "Hidden Within"
- Rob Mercer - Vocals on "Thinking about you"
- Kenny Wesley - Vocals, Vocal Arrangement on "Rock with you"
- David Joubert - Keyboard on "Rock with you"
- Greg Adams - Trumpet on "Twilight"
- G.P. Jackson - Vocals on "Juice"
- Marcus Mitchell - Saxophone on "Alright Now"

== See also ==
- Kenny Wesley
