= Forever Famicom =

Studio album by Random
- Released: June 1, 2010
- Recorded: 2010
- Genres: Hip-hop, nerdcore
- Length: 55:45
- Label: Neosonic Productions
- Producer: K-Murdock

Random chronology
RANDOMONIUM (2009)	Forever Famicom (2010)	Black Materia: Final Fantasy VII (2011)

Forever Famicom is a studio album by American rapper Random and K-Murdock, released on June 1, 2010 by Neosonic Records. It samples from a variety of NES and Super NES games. The album has been released in the US and Japan.

== Production history ==
After releasing his second chiptune album, Mega Ran 9 in 2009, Random released two more albums before the announcement of Forever Famicom on the official Mega Ran website. The album, from its conception in late 2007 to its completion phase, took almost three years of back-and-forth recording with K-Murdock over the Internet. In addition to the announcement, two tracks, "Dream Master" and "Epoch" were leaked in a double-single. On May 23, 2010, preorders were available to be put in before the release date the next week. The album released on June 1, 2010, along with an additional album, Forever Famicom DLC that featured bonus tracks and instrumentals.

On July 7, 2010, Random announced the "Forever Famicom Tour," which was to hit the southeast, starting with Charlotte, North Carolina.

== Track listing ==
All tracks are written by

No.	Title	Length
1.	"Episode III (A New Day)" (Mega Man)	2:51
2.	"Forever" (EarthBound)	4:10
3.	"Dream Master" (Little Nemo: The Dream Master)	4:06
4.	"The Goodness" (Star Fox)	3:58
5.	"Player Two" (Secret of Mana)	3:24
6.	"The Girl with the Make-Up (feat. Ariano)" (Kirby's Dream Land)	4:19
7.	"Drop The Load"	3:55
8.	"World Tree" (Faxanadu)	4:16
9.	"2k10" (Street Fighter 2010)	3:11
10.	"Epoch" (Chrono Trigger)	4:41
11.	"Double Dragons (feat. Jermicide)" (Double Dragon)	3:43
12.	"CONtact" (The Guardian Legend)	2:49
13.	"For The Gamers (feat. Int 80 and Schäffer the Darklord)" (DuckTales)	5:23
14.	"Galaxies" (Metroid)	4:59

Bonus tracks
No.	Title	Length
15.	"Hero Musik (Feat. Illyas)" (iTunes Bonus Track)	3:53
16.	"Priceless" (iTunes Bonus Track)	3:36
17.	"Nerdcore Died?!? (Feat. MC Lars)" (iTunes Bonus Track)	3:56

== Forever Famicom DLC ==
Forever Famicom DLC

On July 6, 2010, Random and K-Murdock released Forever Famicom DLC, an album featuring "downloadable content" for their album released five days earlier. The album includes instrumentals from all fourteen tracks of Forever Famicom, as well as bonus tracks, outtakes, and new pieces.

All tracks are written by

No.	Title	Length
1.	"Hero Musik feat. Ilyas of Tanya Morgan" (Zelda II: The Adventure of Link)	3:53
2.	"Nerdcore Died?!? feat. MC Lars" (F-Zero)	3:56
3.	"Priceless (Doc Tanaka Remix)" (Kid Icarus)	3:36
4.	"Drop The Load (Original Instrumental)"	3:13
5.	"Saturn"	3:24
6.	"Champions" (Rygar)	3:36
7.	"Coastin'" (Bonus Beat)	3:48
8.	"Chills" (Final Fantasy III; Super Adventure Island)	4:16

== Forever Famicom DLC 2 ==
Forever Famicom DLC 2

On September 6, 2011, a second and final installment of "DLC" was released, titled Forever Famicom DLC 2. Instead of outtakes from the original album, DLC 2 features completely new tracks.

All tracks are written by

No.	Title	Length
1.	"By Your Side" (Donkey Kong Country 2)	3:43
2.	"The Ruler's Back" (Final Fantasy VI)	4:16
3.	"The Baddest" (Bad Dudes)	3:12
4.	"Without A Trace" (Super Metroid)	3:21
5.	"Wilyin' Out" (Mega Man 3)	2:42
6.	"Dracula's Curse" (Castlevania III)	3:46
7.	"No Rest" (Castlevania II)	4:59
