= The Regiment (hip-hop group) =

American musical group

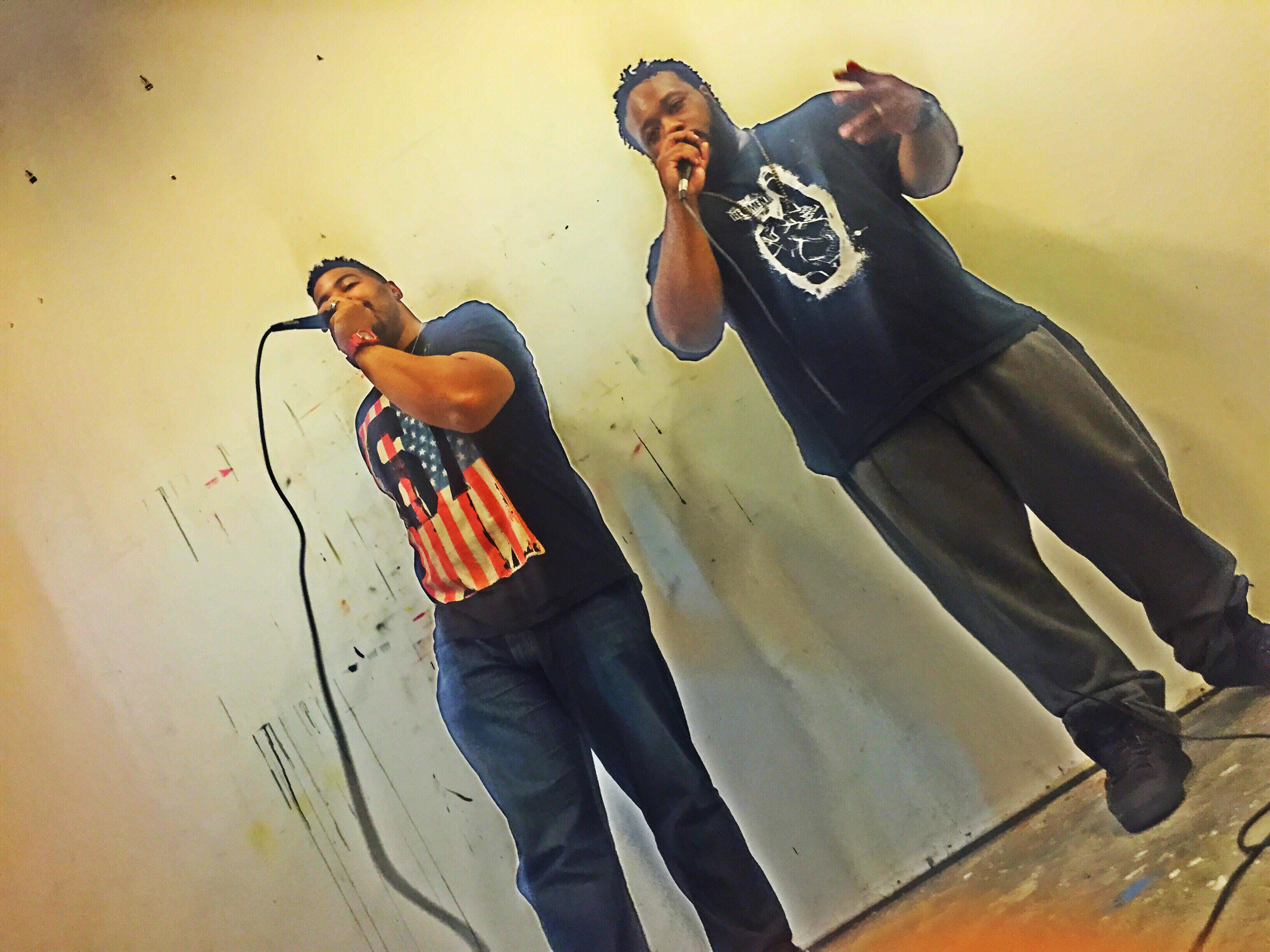
- The Regiment, IseQold and OSI

Background information
- Origin: Detroit, Michigan, U.S.
- Genres: Hip-hop
- Years active: 2006–2016
- Label: HiPNOTT Records
- Members: OSI; IseQold
- Past members: C.Reid
- Website: BandCamp

The Regiment is an American hip-hop duo from Detroit, Michigan, United States. It consists of rappers OSI and IseQold. Their most recent LP, Live from the Coney Island, was released in 2014.

== History ==
The Regiment was founded in 2006 by O.S.I and C.Reid. Both grew up on the same neighborhood on the westside of Detroit. After a year, they released their first major release in 2007, The Come Up with the Rawkus 50 of Rawkus Records. Some years later, the two parted ways. In 2008, a college classmate of O.S.I.'s, IseQold, joined up with him. In 2009, the duo released their first LP as a group, called A New Beginning. Apollo Brown produced their first single, "Old School Vibe". "Abstract" from A New Beginning was featured on iTunes’ Indie Spotlight and was ranked at #8 on their Best of 2009.

In 2010, they released A New Change, a collaborative EP with Soulution. In 2011, they had several releases. They released a mixtape, Back to Lyrics; an EP, First Mondays, and an LP, The Panic Button. The Panic Button was released under HiPNOTT Records, and it received an honorable mention from DJ Premier for their album. "Battle Cry", their first single from The Panic Button, was produced by Apollo Brown. In 2014, The Regiment released their most recent studio album, Live from the Coney Island.

== Discography ==
=== Albums ===
Year	Title
2007	The Come Up: Released: October 16, 2007; Label: Rawkus Records
2009	A New Beginning: Released: August 11, 2009; Label: Soulspazm / Beat Fanatic
2011	First Mondays: Released:September 5, 2011; Label: HiPNOTT Records
2011	The Panic Button: Released: September 20, 2011; Label: HiPNOTT Records
2014	Live from the Coney Island: Released: January 7, 2014; Label: Soul Tools Entertainment

=== Mixtapes ===
- Back to Lyrics (2011)

=== EPs ===
- A New Change (2010) (with Soulution, as Subliminal Thoughts)
- Off the Record (2013) (with Alter Ego)
- A Gamer's Anthem (2014) (with Raheem Jarbo)
- S.O.U.L. (Sound of Us Living) (2015) (with Sinitus Tempo)

=== Singles ===
- "Old School Vibe" (2009)
- "Battle Cry" (2009)
- "100" (2009)
- "Get Away" (2011)
- "Yours and Mine" b/w "We Gon" (with Confidence)
- "Beef" (2014)

=== Guest appearances ===
- Apollo Brown – "Beauty of a Day" from The Reset (2010)
- DJ Duct – Backyard Edit Pt.4: Detroit Session (2011)
- DJ Duct – Backyard Edit Pt.6: Detroit Re-Session EP (2011)
- JR & PH7 – "Fallin for You" from Waiting for the Good Life (2012)
