= The King of Everything Else =

Studio album by Slaine
- Released: August 19, 2014
- Recorded: 2012–14
- Genre: Hip-hop
- Length: 52:01
- Label: Suburban Noize
- Producers: Ivory Daniel (exec.); Kevin Zinger (exec.); Slaine (exec.); Arcitype; DJ Lethal; Lü Balz; Statik Selektah

Slaine chronology
The Boston Project (2013)	The King of Everything Else (2014)	Anti-Hero (2017)

Professional ratings
Review scores
Source	Rating
AllMusic	3.5/5 stars
Exclaim!	7/10
HipHopDX	3/5

The King of Everything Else is the third solo studio album by American rapper Slaine. It was released on August 19, 2014 through Suburban Noize Records. Produced by Louis "Lü Balz" Bell, The Arcitype, DJ Lethal and Statik Selektah with co-producer OshBeats, it features guest appearances from Rite Hook, Apathy, Bishop Lamont, CheckMark (of Skitzofreniks), Ill Bill, Jaysaun, Madchild, Moroney, Regan Hartley, Reks, Tech N9NE, Termanology and Vinnie Paz. The album peaked at number 189 on the Billboard 200, number 26 on the Top R&B/Hip-Hop Albums, number 15 on the Top Rap Albums, number 30 on the Independent Albums and number 4 on the Heatseekers Albums charts in the United States.

== Track listing ==
No.	Title	Writer(s)	Producer(s)	Length
1.	"No Handouts"	George Carroll; Leor Dimant; S. Oshmiansky	DJ Lethal; OshBeats (co.)	2:07
2.	"Destroy Everything"	Carroll; Terrence Nugent; Janos Fulop	The Arcitype	3:59
3.	"Bobby Be Real" (featuring Tech N9ne and Madchild)	Carroll; Aaron Yates; Shane Bunting; Louis Bell	Louis Bell	3:35
4.	"Dot Ave." (featuring Rite Hook)	Carroll; Nugent; Bell	Louis Bell	2:58
5.	"Back Against the Wall" (featuring Moroney and Rite Hook)	Carroll; S. Moroney; Nugent; Bell	Louis Bell	3:22
6.	"Dopehead" (featuring Jaysaun)	Carroll; Bell	Louis Bell	3:39
7.	"Pissed It All Away"	Carroll; Dimant; Oshmiansky	DJ Lethal; OshBeats (co.)	3:38
8.	"The Years"	Carroll; Fulop	The Arcitype	3:15
9.	"Hip Hop Dummy" (featuring Apathy and Bishop Lamont)	Carroll; Chad Bromley; Phillip Martin; Bell	Louis Bell	3:30
10.	"Children of the Revolution" (featuring Ill Bill)	Carroll; William Braunstein; Bell	Louis Bell	3:34
11.	"The Most Dangerous Drug in the World"	Carroll; Bell	Louis Bell	3:23
12.	"Come Back Down" (featuring CheckMark (of Skitzofreniks), Vinnie Paz and Regan Hartley)	Carroll; Mark Girardin; Vincenzo Luvineri; Regan Hartley; Bell	Louis Bell	3:49
13.	"Zip Zero" (featuring Reks and Termanology)	Carroll; Corey Christie; Daniel Carrillo; Fulop	The Arcitype	4:32
14.	"Our Moment"	Carroll; Patrick Baril	Statik Selektah	3:10
15.	"Defiance" (featuring Rite Hook)	Carroll; Nugent; Bell	Louis Bell	3:30
Total length:				52:01

Bonus tracks
No.	Title	Producer(s)	Length
16.	"To the Light"		3:02
17.	"Getting High" (featuring Demrick)	DJ Lethal	4:00

== Charts ==
Chart (2014)	Peak position
US Billboard 200	189
US Top R&B/Hip-Hop Albums (Billboard)	26
US Top Rap Albums (Billboard)	15
US Independent Albums (Billboard)	30
US Heatseekers Albums (Billboard)	4
