= Panacea (group) =

American hip hop group

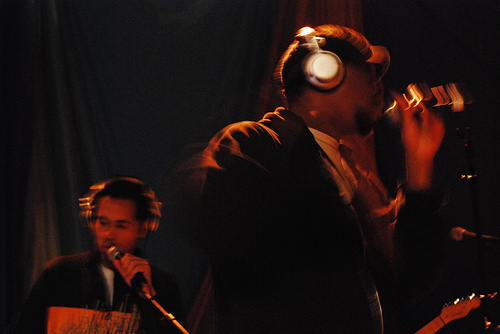
- Panacea live

Background information
- Origin: Washington, D.C., United States
- Genres: Underground hip hop, alternative hip hop
- Years active: 2003–2010
- Labels: Rawkus Records, Tasteful Licks Records, Neosonic Productions
- Members: Raw Poetic; K-Murdock

Panacea is an American hip hop duo, formed in 2003 in Washington, D.C., United States. The duo consists of MC Raw Poetic (Jason Moore) and producer K-Murdock (Kyle Murdock). Throughout their musical career, Panacea has had deals with various labels, including: Glow-in-the-Dark-Records, Rawkus Records and Tasteful Licks. They currently release their music under K-Murdock's imprint, Neosonic Productions.

Combining old-school rhyming with soulful beats, the Washington D.C. duo Panacea have drawn comparisons to revered hip-hoppers like The Roots, Gang Starr, and A Tribe Called Quest. Panacea blend Native Tongues-inspired beats with warm major chords and soul samples and add conscious rhymes about life, love, and hip hop.

== K-Murdock ==
Producer K-Murdock was born and raised in D.C. and has worked with Grammy Nominated R&B singer Raheem DeVaughn. He was raised during the wilting years of hip hop and he developed his love of music at an early age through exposure from older family members (such as his uncle). One crew in particular, the Native Tongues, changed his musical life when he borrowed the cassettes of two of the collective's landmark groups (ATCQ & De La Soul) in the early 1990s.

In 2010, K-Murdock produced an LP called Forever Famicom, a collaboration with rapper Random, which was released on Neosonic Records.

== Raw Poetic ==
MC Raw Poetic is from Philadelphia. Raw Poetic is a rapper with a smooth, clean delivery that moves from quick-paced syncopation into hooks fluidly.

== Panacea ==
When Poetic made the move to D.C., Panacea was born and in 2003 they announced their arrival with the debut EP Thinking Back, Looking Forward on the Los Angeles-based Glow-in-the-Dark label. Panacea generated interest from the re-emerging heavy hitter Rawkus Records which resulted in a joint venture between the two labels. “Partnering with Rawkus increases the visibility of each project. They are embracing the changes to the industry rather than clinging to years past,” states Jaysonic, co-owner of Glow-In-The-Dark. Ink Is My Drink was released in 2006, with "Starlite" as its lead-off single. Their second album The Scenic Route was released in 2007.

== Discography ==
- Thinking Back, Looking Forward (2004)
- Thinking Back, Looking Forward EP (2005)
- Ink is My Drink (Rawkus Records, 2006)
- The Scenic Route (Rawkus Records, 2007)
- A Mind on a Ship Through Time (Tasteful Licks Records, 2008)
- The Re Route (2009)
- Corkscrew Gap EP (2009)
- 12 Step Program (2010)
