= Skitzofreniks =

American hip hop duo

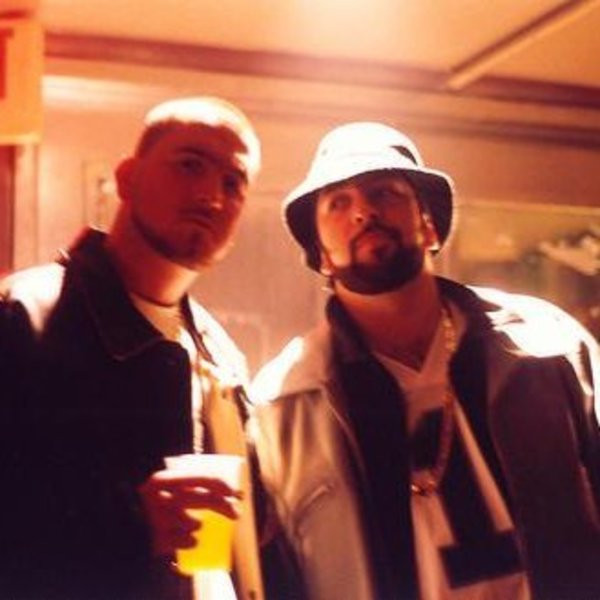

Background information
- Origin: Cambridge, Massachusetts, U.S.
- Genres: Underground hip hop; East Coast hip hop
- Years active: 1995–2008
- Labels: Brick Records; Check1 Records; Bad Magic Records
- Past members: CheckMark (Mark Girardin); Eddie Bones (Erik L. Brown)

Skitzofreniks was an American hip hop duo from Cambridge, Massachusetts, formed in 1995 by rapper CheckMark (Mark Girardin) and DJ and producer Eddie Bones (Erik L. Brown, 1975–2012). The duo released music through Brick Records and their own label, Check1 Records, and were active in the Boston underground hip-hop scene through the late 1990s and 2000s.

== History ==
=== Boss Boiz and formation (1991–1998) ===
Girardin and Brown began working together in Cambridge in 1991 as the Boss Boiz. Managed by Buff Love (The Human Beat Box) of The Fat Boys, the group signed with Warner Bros. Records in 1992 and moved to Atlantic Records in 1993, recording demo material at Quad Studios in New York City. The record deal ended following Buff Love's death in 1995. Girardin and Brown subsequently renamed the group Skitzofreniks.

The duo distributed demos on DAT tapes to Boston college radio, receiving regular airplay on Emerson College's WERS (88.9 FM). They built an audience through shows in the Central Square area of Cambridge, which led to a recording contract with Boston independent label Brick Records.

=== Brick Records, touring, and Enter the Realm (1999–2003) ===
In 1999, Brick Records released the duo's debut EP, On My Own SH!T (BRK 007). From 1996 to 2004, the group played Boston clubs and toured colleges across the Northeast, sharing bills with 7L & Esoteric, Akrobatik, Virtuoso, Porn Theater Ushers, and Jedi Mind Tricks.

In May 2000, Skitzofreniks was featured in Thrasher Magazine. In January 2001, their 12-inch single "C'Mon Dude!?!" was reviewed in CMJ New Music Report. The group also hosted an official website and discussion forum that became a regional message board for local independent hip-hop.

In 2002, the duo released their debut studio album, Enter the Realm, on Check1 Records (CK1-001), reviewed in Rockpile in June 2002.

In 2003, Girardin recorded the song "Come Get It" with Big Daddy Kane and DJ Revolution for Swedish producer Soul Supreme's album The Saturday Nite Agenda (Fat Beats). Girardin and Kane performed the track together at The Roxy in Boston. The track was reviewed in The Michigan Daily and RapReviews.

=== Hiatus, death of Eddie Bones, and later projects ===
The group stopped performing around 2008 after a diving accident left Brown paralyzed. Brown died on February 4, 2012, at age 36. In May 2012, a tribute concert was held at the Middle East in Cambridge, featuring performances by Edo G, Akrobatik, and Reks.

In 2020, Girardin released the solo album Vita Matta, Pt. 1 on Check1 Records, produced by DC the Midi Alien and recorded by Bob Nash at Wonka Sound. The Cambridge-based Bridgeside Cyphers has cited the Skitzofreniks' early history in Central Square as an influence on the local scene.

== Discography ==
=== Studio albums ===
- Enter the Realm (2002, Check1 Records)

=== EPs ===
- On My Own SH!T (1999, Brick Records)

=== Singles ===
- "On My Own Sh!t" / "Super Hoe" / "Skitzofreniks' State" / "Sicilians (Remix)" (1999, Brick Records)
- "Slow It Down" (2000, Bad Magic Records)
- "C'Mon Dude!?!" / "Revenge of the Herbs" / "Charlie's Angles" (2001, Brick Records)
- "Naturally (Walking Contradiction)" / "On My Own Shit (Revisited)" / "It Don't Matter" (2002, Brick Records)

=== CheckMark solo releases ===
- Vita Matta, Pt. 1 (2020, Check1 Records)
- "Stupid Stupid" / "Fuck Outta Here" (2020, Check1 Records)

=== Guest appearances ===
- "Come Get It" – Soul Supreme feat. Big Daddy Kane, CheckMark & DJ Revolution (2003, The Saturday Nite Agenda)
- "Borrowed Time" – Slaine feat. CheckMark & Lü Balz (2011, A World with No Skies)
- "Fight Club" – Snowgoons feat. CheckMark (2012, Snowgoons Dynasty)
- "Come Back Down" – Slaine feat. CheckMark, Vinnie Paz, and Regan Hartley (2014, The King of Everything Else)
