= Ink Is My Drink =

2006 studio album by Panacea

Studio album by Panacea
- Released: October 3, 2006; April 25, 2011 (Re-release)
- Genre: Underground hip hop
- Length: 47:26 min 50:39 min (Re-release)
- Label: Rawkus Records; Glow-in-the-dark Records

Professional ratings
Review scores
Source	Rating
Allmusic	4/5 stars
PopMatters	5/10 stars
The Skinny	4/5 stars

Ink Is My Drink is the second full-length album by Panacea. It was released on October 3, 2006, on Rawkus Records. A re-release came in 2011 on Neosonic Productions and called "The Producers Cut", it came with a new cover and some additional skits.

== Track listing ==
1. "Trip of the Century"
2. "Invisible Seas"
3. "Place on Earth"
4. "Steel Kites"
5. "Coulda Woulda Shoulda"
6. "Reel Me In"
7. "PULSE"
8. "Work of Art"
9. "These Words"
10. "Ecosphere"
11. "Burning Bush"
12. "Starlite"
13. "Sunburst (Bonus)"
14. "Pupil Stars (Bonus)"

Re-Release 2011

1. "Trip of the Century"
2. "Capsized"
3. "Invisible Seas"
4. "Everywhere is the same"
5. "Place on Earth"
6. "Steel Kites"
7. "Coulda Woulda Shoulda"
8. "Stuck"
9. "Reel Me In"
10. "PULSE"
11. "Love Hurts"
12. "Work of Art"
13. "These Words"
14. "Ecosphere"
15. "The Expandables"
16. "Burning Bush"
17. "Starlite"
