= Hidden Gems (O.C. album) =

Compilation album by O.C.
- Released: April 3, 2007
- Genre: Hip-hop
- Label: Next Mill Entertainment
- Producer: Buckwild, O.Gee, DJ Premier, Diamond D, Show, Organized Konfusion

O.C. chronology
Smoke and Mirrors (2005)	Hidden Gems (2007)	Oasis: Together Brothers (with AG) (2009)

Hidden Gems is a compilation album by rapper O.C. from the D.I.T.C. crew, released on April 3, 2007. It's a mix of non-album songs, remixes, unreleased tracks and soundtracks and a couple of works with his group. The earliest tracks appearing here dates back to 1992 with the demo version of "O-Zone" and the previously unreleased "Snakes", and the album also includes two newly recorded songs. The tracks are placed in chronological order and works as an overseeing of O.C.'s career (excluding his own solo albums) between his start to 2007.

== Track listing ==
1. "Ozone (Original Unreleased Version)"prod. by Buckwild
2. "Snakes" original demo song
3. "Word...Life (Remix)"remixed by DJ Celory
4. "Stronjay (Original Unreleased Version)" prod. by O.Gee
5. "Crooklyn" feat. Chubb Rock and Jeru the Damaja, prod. DJ Premier
6. "You Won't Go Far" feat. Organized Konfusion
7. "Day One" feat. DITC, prod. by Diamond D
8. "Get Yours (Remix)" feat. Big L and Diamond, prod. by Show
9. "King of N.Y." prod. by J-Love
10. "Bonafied" featuring Jay-Z, prod. by Buckwild
11. "Wordplay" featuring Da Ranjahz, prod. by Buckwild
12. "U-N-I" prod. by Buckwild
13. "Half Good, Half Sinner" produced by Buckwild
14. "Emotions (Remix)" featuring Ja Shawn
15. "The Inventor" [New] produced by O.Gee
16. "Yes Sir" featuring Sadat X" [New] produced by O.Gee
