= Next Time Gadget =

Next.Time.Gadget
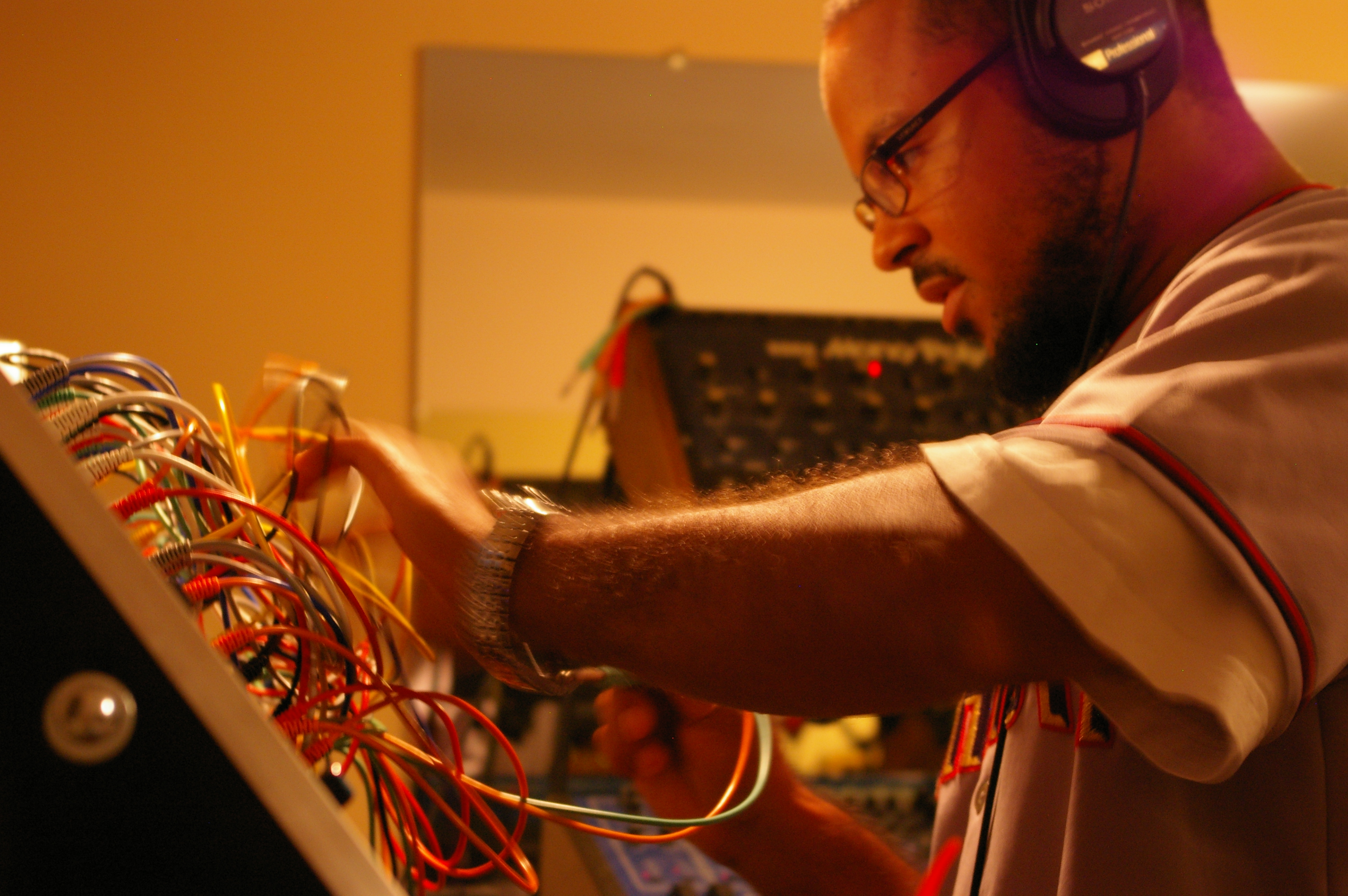
- NTG at Pooh+2 Studios

Background information
- Birth name: Jason Mosby
- Also known as: Arcade Funk Machine, Thiemo, H8r, Captain Tragedy, Ohm Boy, George and Ma'am, Stankassjazz
- Born: January 6, 1980 (age 45)
- Origin: Atmore, AL, U.S.
- Genres: Electronic music, arcade funk, glitch, drum and bass, intelligent dance music
- Years active: 1995–present
- Labels: Tasteful Licks Records
- Website: Next.Time.Gadget

Jason Mosby, who performs under the name Next Time Gadget, is an American electronic musician best known for his works in the genre of arcade funk. His pseudonym is often presented in programming class structure (Next.Time.Gadget) or camelCase (nextTimeGadget).

== Career ==
=== Early career ===
Jason Mosby began producing music at 13 years of age, creating unconventional mashups of hip-hop, funk, rock, and alternative music. From 1994-2000, he performed with a number of rock, alternative, and hip-hop groups as a bass player or drummer, anchored by his stints as the lead vocalist/emcee for the hip-hop/nu metal group Moses and drum programmer for the cult arcade funk group Stankassjazz. In 2000, Jason Mosby embarked on his solo career, initially composing and licensing original music commercially for companies like Viacom, Sprint, and Verizon.

In 2003, Jason Mosby reclusively opened Pooh+2 Studios and released his first solo album Brownmail under the moniker Stankassjazz. Unlike Stankassjazz’s group works which were intentionally nonsensical, Brownmail exhibited the versatility, progression, and contrast that became his mainstay in his subsequent releases. Brownmail also unveiled the ambient track A Song for Someone that Jason considers to be "the best thing I’ve ever written", and that has been included as track eleven on each of his full-length releases since. In 2005 Jason released These Are The Days!, ironically named considering its content of dark, driving, glitch-heavy drum and bass and IDM.

=== Tasteful Licks Records ===
In 2006, Jason Mosby signed on to Tasteful Licks Records and assumed the pseudonym Next Time Gadget. On August 21, 2007 he released his third solo album Bit[r] on Tasteful Licks Records. In stark contrast to his previous solo releases, the tracks selected for Bit[r], a collection of original tracks from live sessions conducted from 2003 to 2007, were purposely lighter and more basic in their construction.

=== Recent ===
Mosby's fourth full-length album midRange was expected to be released on Tasteful Licks Records in the summer of 2011. He also functions as the Managing Member for Tasteful Licks Records and occasionally as an Executive Producer.

== Discography ==
- 2011 midRange
- 2007 Bit[r]
- 2005 These Are The Days!
- 2003 Brownmail
