= Ecosphere (social enterprise) =

Ecosphere is a social enterprise that works on the sustainable development of Spiti Valley by focusing on economic empowerment, environmental conservation, and community development in the cold mountain desert of the Indian Trans-Himalayas.

== History ==
Ecosphere was founded in 2006 by Sunil Chauhan & Ishita Khanna, an alumnus of the Tata Institute of Social Sciences, as a combination of three non-governmental organisations—Muse, Spiti Trans-Himalayan Action Group (STAG), and Spiti Sea buckthorn Society (SSS).

== Development initiatives ==
=== Responsible travel ===
Ecosphere's travels offer an insight into the culture, nature, history, ecology, and legends of these valleys, and claim to make certain that visits benefit the economy, conservation, and development of these regions. Emissions that are generated are calculated and offset through investments in Ecosphere’s renewable energy initiatives in the region, so that trips may leave a zero carbon footprint in the Himalayas

Ecosphere’s trips offer glimpses of Tibetan Buddhism and culture, stays in authentic home-stays, mountain biking, treks, and hikes, mountain climbing and rafting, bird watching, floral and wildlife expeditions, educational, and volunteering tours, culinary, special interest and signature tours.

=== Sea buckthorn products ===
Ecosphere tries to combine traditional Buddhist systems of healing and health with modern science. The Sea buckthorn berry, popularly known as the ‘Wonder berry’, has a unique composition of vitamins, minerals, nutrients and essential fatty acids, typically only found separately in other sources. Ecosphere has developed a range of products from this berry that grows naturally in the Himalayas. The propagation of Sea buckthorn benefits this cold desert region ecologically, given its soil-binding and nitrogen-fixing nature, and Ecosphere claims its collection creates sustainable livelihoods for women in the region.

=== Local handicrafts ===
The Himalayas are home to unique handicrafts like Thangkas (paintings on silken canvas), Zama (mud craft) and Lingzy (woven shawls with traditional motifs). Ecosphere has enabled local groups to preserve these traditional art forms, generate alternate sources of income and improve the quality and marketability of such products.

=== Green energy ===
Due to the extreme winter climate, the residents of the Trans-Himalayas burn a lot of coal, wood, and dung to cook and keep warm in winter. However, using the abundant solar energy in the region, they can minimize fuel-wood consumption, and reduce both greenhouse gas emissions and health problems associated with excessive smoke.

Ecosphere’s green energy initiatives include: - Promoting greenhouses so locals can access fresh vegetables around the year, generating additional income and improving their nutritional intake. - Providing energy-efficient housing solutions through Solar Passive techniques, which reduce fuel consumption by 60%, help to mitigate global warming, keep the inner air smokeless, reduce cold-related illnesses, and enable income generation via indoor activities like handicrafts. - Promoting renewable energy options like Solar Geysers, Solar Passive Baths, Cookers and Lanterns, to reduce fuel-wood consumption and carbon emissions, enabling local homes and traveler accommodations to be more eco-friendly and improving hygiene levels.

== Awards and recognition ==
=== CNN IBN Real Heroes Award 2010 ===
See Real Heroes Award Ishita Khanna, founder of Ecosphere, received the real heroes award from CNN-IBN in 2010, for her initiatives in the Lahaul and Spiti district of Himachal Pradesh, including the Tsering tea initiative, which helps generate sustainable incomes for women in the region.

=== Virgin Holidays Responsible Tourism Award 2010 ===
Ecosphere received the Virgin Holidays Responsible Tourism Award 2010 for being the best organization in a mountain environment. Virgin Holidays recognized Ecosphere as a self-reliant social enterprise that moved from being donor-funded to self-supporting, and in enabling 55 out of the 66 villages in Spiti to increase their incomes by up to 50% through Ecosphere's development initiatives.

=== The Sierra Club ‘Green Energy and Green Livelihoods Achievement Award’ 2009 ===
In 2009, the Sierra Club, the oldest and largest grassroots environmental organization in the US, recognized Ecosphere for developing sustainable livelihoods for the local community and linking it to nature and culture conservation.

=== The Ashden Awards for Sustainable Energy 2009 ===
Ecosphere received the coveted Ashden Award - Global Energy Award Winners 2009, as a collaborator in the consortium of NGOs from Spiti and Ladakh, in a special ceremony held in London. The award was presented by Prince Charles.

=== Wild Asia Responsible Tourism Award 2008 ===
Ecosphere was the recipient of the Wild Asia Responsible Tourism Award in the community initiative category, for recognition of their work on the promotion and development of responsible eco-travel in Spiti valley.
