= Second Skin (2008 film) =

- Directed by: Juan Carlos Piñeiro Escoriaza
- Written by: Victor Piñeiro Escoriaza
- Produced by: Peter Schieffelin Brauer & Victor Piñeiro Escoriaza
- Cinematography: Juan Carlos Piñeiro Escoriaza
- Edited by: Juan Carlos Piñeiro Escoriaza
- Music by: David Gregory Byrne
- Release dates: March 7, 2008; August 25, 2009 (DVD)
- Running time: 95 minutes
- Country: US

Second Skin is a 2008 American documentary film that follows the lives of seven people as they delve into the world of MMORPGs (Massively Multiplayer Online Role Playing Games). The film was directed by Juan Carlos Piñeiro Escoriaza and produced by Victor Piñeiro Escoriaza and Peter Brauer.

Second Skin premiered to positive reviews and sold-out crowds at the South by Southwest film festival in 2008. It became the No. 1 movie on online streaming site Hulu.com, before completing a limited theatrical run. The film was released on DVD August 25, 2009. It is frequently included in lists of the all-time best video game documentaries.

== Summary ==
=== Synopsis ===
Second Skin examines people whose lives have been transformed by virtual worlds in online games such as World of Warcraft, EverQuest, EverQuest II and Second Life. The documentary follows a group of online gamers whose lives are intensely woven together inside and outside the virtual worlds, a couple whose lives have changed since meeting online, and an avid player whose life spins out of control due to his addiction to playing MMOs. It also presents disabled players who have been given voice and mobility in the virtual world and explores the controversial world of Chinese gold farming and presents facts about online gaming.

=== Cast ===
The film follows three distinct stories involving seven people:

- Heather Cowan, an EverQuest II player that lives in Florida;
- Kevin Keel, an EverQuest II player from Texas develops an in-game relationship with Heather that moves from an online status to a physical relationship;
- Matt Ellsworth and Chris Mitchell, housemates in Fort Wayne, Indiana who play World of Warcraft and other MMOs for over 40 hours a week;
- Anthony Cronin, a housemate with Matt and Chris whose life changes by getting married;
- Andy Belford, a World of Warcraft player (who moved to Ft. Wayne from California to be closer to Anthony, Matt, and Chris) and his wife Karalee, and the changes in their lives after Karalee becomes pregnant;
- Dan Bustard, a World of Warcraft player whose addiction to the game cost him his relationship, his business, his health and his home. He connects with OLGA (Online Gamers Anonymous) during his attempt to kick his addiction to gaming.

Other players, doctors, and the founder of OLGA appear.

== Distribution ==
Second Skin made its world premiere at the South By Southwest film festival, showcased as a Spotlight Premiere.

Second Skin was available for free viewing on Hulu between August 7 and August 13, 2009, courtesy of Honda.

== Reception ==
The film has received critical acclaim from both the cinematic and gaming communities. When it premiered at the SXSW Film Festival in 2008, Ain’t It Cool News said that it was “by far the best documentary of the online gaming phenomenon known as MMORPGs out there. The filmmakers touch on just about every angle of these online games as they could." The Austin Chronicle reported that "Mixing expert opinion with amazingly true testimonials, Second Skin might just be the most accurate and entertaining glimpse of the economy and psychology of technology since Tron."

Online game magazine The Escapist sums the film up in this way: "Documentary nuts walk away having seen a window into yet another strange world. And gamers walk away feeling like they had seen their life story, with slick editing, a peppy soundtrack, and the seductive polish of an Apple commercial." Richard Garriott, creator of the successful Ultima and Tabula Rasa MMO’s, cited the film as "A superb documentary unveiling a digital subculture that has bridged the gaps of time, distance and humanity."

== After filming ==
Heather Cowan died on February 26, 2017.
