= Soul Supreme =

Swedish record producer

- Also known as: Kocky
- Born: David Åström; 17 February 1983 (age 43); Sweden
- Genres: hip hop electro
- Occupation: hip hop producer
- Label: Grit Records

Soul Supreme (real name David Åström), born 1983, is a hip hop producer from Sweden. He has worked with the likes of KRS-One, Pete Rock, Big Daddy Kane and CheckMark (of Skitzofreniks).

== Career ==
In 2003 he released his debut self-produced album The Saturday Night Agenda as Soul Supreme on Boston-based Grit Records. The album featured KRS-One, Big Daddy Kane, CheckMark (of Skitzofreniks, Pete Rock, O.C. and many more. Later the same year he produced the mixtape "Soulmatic", a remixed version of Nas classic album "Stillmatic", released through hiphopsite.com. In 2004 he added mixtape, Soul & Sense, containing remixes on early Common material.In 2005 this was released on Nocturne as a CD entitled Uncommonly Nasty: Remixed By Soul Supreme & Statik Selektah. In 2006 he made URB Magazine's list of the next 100 producers. His production borrows heavily from, often pitched-up, soul samples, hence the name. He is signed to JuJu Publishing.

Soul Supreme also makes more electro-themed music (his preferred name for this style is rapclash) under the name Kocky. In 2007, Soul Supreme released an electro-house album called Kingdome Come as Kocky. The album was released by La Vida Locash and features guest appearances by Timbuktu, Chords, Mapei, and Jens Lekman.

== Albums ==
=== Soul Supreme ===
- Soulmatic (2002)
- Instrumental 4 the Mind, Body and Soul (2003)
- The Saturday Nite Agenda (2003)
- Soul & Sense (2004)

=== Kocky ===
- Kingdom Came (2007)
- Stadium Status (2008)
