= DJ Jamad =

American DJ and radio host known as (born 1969)

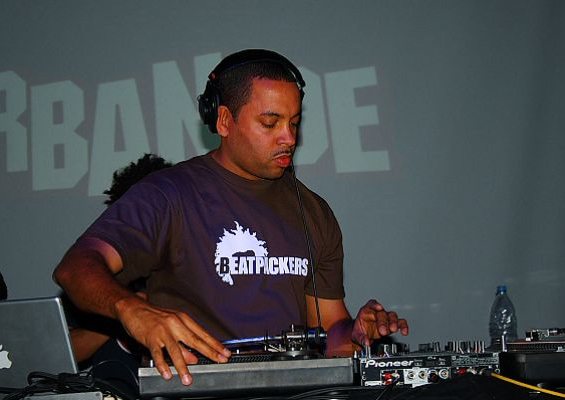
- DJ Jamad in Frankfurt, Germany

Background information
- Born: Jamad Walden
- Origin: Allentown, Pennsylvania, U.S.
- Genres: Hip hop, Soul, R&B
- Occupation: DJ
- Years active: 1987–present
- Label: Indie
- Website: www.djjamad.com

Jamad Scott Walden (born 1969) is an American DJ and radio host known as DJ Jamad. He is from Allentown, Pennsylvania, and now lives in Atlanta, Georgia.

== Music ==
DJ Jamad had a passion for music from an early age.

His main mixtape series is called Afromentals.

DJ Jamad also produces the Afromentals Mixshow, a long-standing weekly radio show on Sirius Satellite. Periodically, he presents Operation Hot Combs (OHC), a one-hour “guest takeover” that airs during the mixshow. These special segments allow artists, producers, and DJs an opportunity to guest host and promote their individual projects and talents while giving listeners a candid view of the featured entertainers and their personal musical interests.
