= Wes Felton =

American singer, poet, actor, and emcee

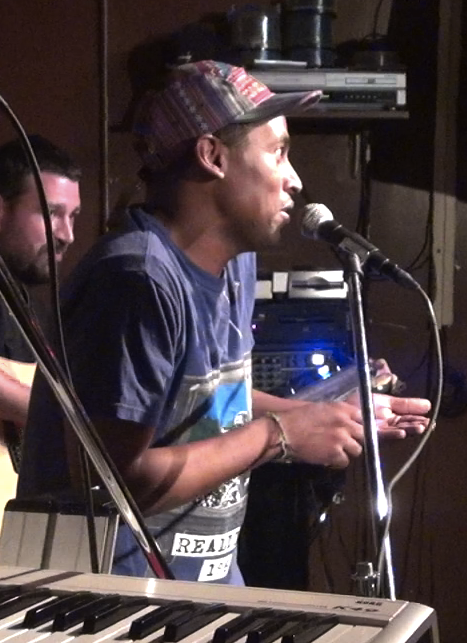
- Wes Felton performing in Brooklyn in 2012

Background information
- Born: Wesley Ellington Felton; Washington, D.C., U.S.
- Origin: Washington, D.C., U.S.
- Genres: Hip Hop, Soul, Jazz
- Occupations: singer, actor, emcee
- Label: Tasteful Licks Records
- Website: Wes Felton

Wesley Ellington Felton is an American singer, poet, rapper and actor, born and raised in Washington, D.C.

== Personal life ==
Wes Felton had a very musical upbringing. His father is Hilton C. Felton, a jazz pianist who had performed with George Benson, Grant Green and many others. Wes has a son named Tobias.

== Music ==
Wes Felton started out with a lot of open mic nights. As a teenager he performed on the Lollapalooza tour and at the Apollo Theater. Ellington has been on stage with Mos Def, De La Soul, Meshell Ndegeocello and with his mentor UK Soul legend Omar. He has been crowned "the future folk-soul hero" by Complex Magazine for his vocals on Prince Paul’s Politics of the Business album.

=== Collaborations ===
His collaboration with JLaine and TFox under the name Antithesis has so far resulted in two releases on Tasteful Licks. W. E. Felton has also been working with Raheem DeVaughn. Together they are The Crossrhodes.

=== Acting ===
Felton studied theater for four years at Carnegie Mellon University in Pittsburgh. In 1999, he starred in the critically acclaimed hip-hop play Rhyme Deferred, performed at the Kennedy Center, the National Black Theatre Festival, and the Nuyorican Poets Café. Ellington had a role in Multitudes of Mercies, a movie that aired on BET worldwide December 1, 2005 as a part of World AIDS Day. His most recent film with the Thievery Corporation is called Babylon Central.

=== Writing ===
Wes Felton started writing when he was 13. He has so far published two books of poetry.

== Discography ==
=== Releases ===
- 1996: Experiments, self-released
- 1997: The Final Day, self-released
- 2001: Soul Sonnets, Art Hurts
- 2003: Bluetopia, Art!Hurts/Toronto August Music
- 2005: Postcards From the Edge
- 2006: A Dub Supreme, Art Hurts
- 2006: Outrospective: Me Then, Me Now, Genesis Poets Music
- 2008: Distraction City, Tasteful Licks Records
- 2009: Dub Ell 101 (the Vault vol.1), Hilton's Concept/Art Hurts
- 2010: Land of Sheep, Ruled By Pigs, Ran By Wolves, self-released
- 2013: Imagine The Future, self-released

==== Wes Felton x KeepanEyeonTheProduct ====
- 2018: Kings in the Wilderness, Fresh Kids Music Group

==== The Crossrhodes ====
- 2004: Limited Budget, Unlimited Quality, Urban Ave Music/Art Hurts
- 2005: The Invitation, Urban Ave Music/Art Hurts
- 2017: "Footprints on the Moon", BMG/368 MUSIC GROUP

==== Antithesis ====
- 2008: Antithesis, Tasteful Licks Records
- 2010: Love Daze, Tasteful Licks Records

=== Production ===
- 2005: The Love Experience, Jive Records

=== Appears On ===
- 2002: The Healing by Urban Ave 31, song: Growing Up, Urban Ave Music
- 2003: The Healing Pt.2 by Urban Ave 31, song: Antidote, Urban Ave Music
- 2003: Politics of the Business, by Prince Paul, song: Beautifully Absurd, Razor & Tie
- 2004: Thinking Back Looking Forward, Neosonic Productions
- 2004: Never Scared by Chris Rock, song: Black Poet, DreamWorks
- 2004: Moments of Clarity by Wayna, song: So Long Heartache, Wayna
- 2004: "All Seasons" by the illpoets.com Collective, song: "Fall"
- 2005: The Love Experience, Jive Records
- 2006: Ink Is My Drink, Rawkus Records
- 2006: Ruff Drafts Volume 1, JapaNUBIA Musik
- 2008: A Mind on a Ship Through Time, Tasteful Licks Records
- 2008: Square Binizz, Resurrection Records
- 2008: Conflict by Sy Smith, song: Reach Down In Your Soul, Sy Smith Music
- 2009: Music Fan First by Eric Roberson, song: The Hunger, Blue Erro Soul
- 2018: Fresh Kids Vol.1 by Fresh Kids, song: Horror Story, Fresh Kids Music Group
- 2018: ...Smile by Davy Fresh, song: Black Pride, Fresh Kids Music Group

== See also ==
- JLaine
- Tasteful Licks Records
- Mos Def
- Raquel "Ra" Brown
