= List of Hangin' with Mr. Cooper episodes =

Hangin' with Mr. Cooper is an American television sitcom that starred Mark Curry as the titular character, an NBA player-turned-substitute teacher/gym coach (and later basketball coach). Holly Robinson played his roommate Vanessa. The show ran for five seasons from 1992 to 1997 on ABC, airing a total of 101 episodes.

== Series overview ==
Season	Episodes	Originally released		Rank	Rating
Season	Episodes	First released	Last released	Rank	Rating
1	22	September 22, 1992	May 18, 1993	16	14.6 (Tied with The Fresh Prince of Bel-Air and The Jackie Thomas Show)
2	22	September 24, 1993	May 20, 1994	38	11.92
3	22	September 23, 1994	May 12, 1995	41	11.2
4	22	September 15, 1995	May 10, 1996	61	9.3
5	13	June 21, 1997	August 30, 1997	94	3.2

=== Broadcast history ===
- September 1992 - July 1993, ABC Tuesday 8:30–9:00
- August 1993 - September 1993, ABC Friday 8:30–9:00
- September 1993 - August 1996, ABC Friday 9:30–10:00
- June 1997 - August 1997, ABC Saturday 8:30–9:00
- August 1997, ABC Friday 9:30–10:00 (in addition to the Saturday August episodes)

== Episodes ==
=== Season 1 (1992–1993) ===
No. overall	No. in season	Title	Directed by	Written by	Original release date	Prod. code	U.S. viewers (millions)
1	1	"The Presentation"	Joel Zwick	Jeff Franklin	September 22, 1992	475060	22.7
Mark Cooper is hired as a substitute teacher and his roommate Robin teaches him how to control his students. Alan Thicke guest stars as Jason Seaver from Growing Pains, who gives Mark the Seaver home following the end of Pains.
2	2	"Hangin' with Michelle"	Joel Zwick	Jeff Franklin	September 29, 1992	455001	24.4
Michelle Tanner (Mary-Kate and Ashley Olsen) from Full House takes care of Mark when he hurts himself substituting for her class. John Stamos makes an uncredited appearance as Uncle Jesse. Note: The house is officially changed like the one Mark Cooper lives in 5 years. Trivia; The actor John Posey appears. He was originally cast as Danny Tanner on Full House. So that makes 4 actors from Full House here.
3	3	"On the Rebound"	Jeff Melman	Yvette Lee Bowser & Clay Graham	October 6, 1992	455005	24.7
Mark's old flame comes back to town and reignites their passion.
4	4	"Please Pass the Jock"	Jeff Melman	Jeff Astrof & Mike Sikowitz	October 20, 1992	455006	21.6
Mark helps a student basketball player pass an algebra test.
5	5	"Cheers"	Jeff Melman	Joe Toplyn	October 27, 1992	455004	23.5
Mark asks Vanessa to help train a team of untalented cheerleaders.
6	6	"Warriors (Part 1)"	Jeff Melman	Story by : Jeff Franklin & Leo J. Lawrence; Teleplay by : Leo J. Lawrence	November 10, 1992	455007	20.9
Mark is offered a contract to play for a professional basketball team for the Golden State Warriors and offered to be in the preseason after getting a permanent teaching job as a basketball coach. To be continued...
7	7	"Warriors (Part 2)"	Jeff Melman	Story by : Jeff Franklin; Teleplay by : Alan Eisenstock & Larry Mintz	November 17, 1992	455008	23.5
Mark is given a temporary contract to play professional basketball with the Golden State Warriors, but must play guard against Charles Barkley. Cooper got cut from the team.
8	8	"Torn Between Two Teachers"	Jeff Melman	Jeff Astrof & Mike Sikowitz	November 24, 1992	455009	23.0
Andre must choose between basketball and music.
9	9	"My Dinner with Mark"	Jeff Melman	Kevin Abbott	December 1, 1992	455003	24.1
Vanessa's boss gets stranded at an airport, so Mark must pretend to be him for a meeting with a businesswoman.
10	10	"Miracle in Oaktown"	Jeff Melman	Yvette Lee Bowser	December 15, 1992	455011	21.9
Mark helps a boy's Christmas wish come true while playing Santa Claus.
11	11	"Unforgettable"	Jeff Melman	Michael Dinwiddie & Imani	January 5, 1993	455010	25.4
Mark helps Robin settle an argument with her father. Saundra Quarterman who played one of the club patrons would join the cast the next season as Mark's cousin Geneva Lee.
12	12	"In Vanessa We Trust"	Tony Singletary	Kevin Abbott & Clay Graham	January 12, 1993	455012	24.5
Mark, Vanessa and Robin try to buy their own apartment when their landlord dies. Note: First appearance of Marquise Wilson as Tyler Foster.
13	13	"Forbidden Fruit"	Tony Singletary	Neil Lebowitz	January 19, 1993	455013	22.9
Mark dates an attractive schoolteacher whose father happens to be Coach Ricketts.
14	14	"How to Succeed in Business Without Really Trying"	Tony Singletary	Story by : Danny Kallis; Teleplay by : Kevin Abbott & Clay Graham	February 2, 1993	455014	21.0
Mark gets promoted to an executive position when takes a temporary job in an office mail room.
15	15	"Valentine's Day Massacre"	Tony Singletary	Story by : Jeff Franklin & Leo J. Lawrence; Teleplay by : Leo J. Lawrence	February 9, 1993	455015	24.1
On Valentine's Day, Robin and Vanessa win dates with handsome bachelors on a game show while Mark spends the day at home.
16	16	"Boyz in the Woodz"	Tony Singletary	Calvin Brown, Jr.	February 16, 1993	455016	22.9
Mark, Vanessa and Robin go on a camping trip with a group of high school students.
17	17	"Boys Don't Leave"	Tony Singletary	Jeff Franklin	February 23, 1993	455017	25.4
Tyler wants to move in with Mark, Vanessa and Robin out of jealousy for his parents' new baby.
18	18	"The Unteachables"	Tony Singletary	Jeff Astrof & Mike Sikowitz	March 2, 1993	455018	25.6
Coach Ricketts bets that Mark can't teach history to a group of a lazy students.
19	19	"Piano Lesson"	Tony Singletary	Gary Hardwick	March 16, 1993	455019	24.1
Robin feels neglected when Mark and Vanessa become close.
20	20	"P.M.S.: Post Moving-in Syndrome"	Joel Zwick	Yvette Lee Bowser	April 13, 1993	455002	21.5
Mark, Robin and Vanessa learn to share the responsibilities of living together.
21	21	"A Moving Experience"	Tony Singletary	Jeff Franklin	May 11, 1993	455021	17.3
Trey talks Mark into being roommates in an apartment building full of beautiful women and wild parties.
22	22	"Livin' a Large Lie"	Tony Singletary	Jeff Franklin & Leilani Downer	May 18, 1993	455020	19.1
Mark asks Robin and Vanessa to be his servants in an effort to impress his visiting grandmother. Note: Final appearance of Dawnn Lewis as Robin Dumars.

=== Season 2 (1993–1994) ===
No. overall	No. in season	Title	Directed by	Written by	Original release date	Prod. code	U.S. viewers (millions)
23	1	"Baby Love"	John Bowab	Leilani Downer & Cheryl Gard	September 24, 1993	455552	17.6
Mark's cousin, Geneva (Saundra Quarterman), and her daughter Nicole (Raven Symone), move into Mark and Vanessa's house. Notes: First appearances of Raven-Symoné as Nicole Lee and Saundra Quarterman as Geneva Lee; Marquise Wilson is also promoted to main cast in season 2.
24	2	"Slumber Party"	John Bowab	Susan Seeger	October 1, 1993	455551	18.9
When Vanessa and Geneva get stranded in the middle of a forest due to a broken down car, Mark is forced to chaperone Nicole's slumber party by himself.
25	3	"School's a Drag"	John Bowab	Leilani Downer & Cheryl Gard	October 8, 1993	455553	20.0
Mark gets into an accident with the school's drivers' education car and fears the tough new principal, P.J. Moore, may discharge him. Note: First appearance of Nell Carter as P.J. Moore.
26	4	"Limpin' Lizards"	John Bowab	Efrem Seeger	October 15, 1993	455554	20.6
Nicole gets the part as the new crocodile kid on the "Lester the Lizard and Crocodile Kids" show. When Mark complains about being assigned as the Driver's.
27	5	"Free at Last"	John Bowab	Leilani Downer	October 22, 1993	455556	17.4
When Vanessa is not given the promotion she was promised, she takes Mark's advice to demand her rights and is promptly discharged from her job.
28	6	"Father Fairest"	John Bowab	Efrem Seeger	October 29, 1993	455555	20.2
When Earvin tells Mark that his greatest wish is to see his long-lost father, Mark locates Earvin's dad and invites him to Halloween dance, with nearly disastrous consequences.
29	7	"The Goodbye Girl"	John Bowab	Myra J.	November 5, 1993	455557	19.7
Mark persuades Geneva to use "reverse psychology" on the rebellious Nicole, and they let her do anything she wants to teach her the rules are important.
30	8	"Seoul Shake"	John Bowab	Samm-Art Williams	November 12, 1993	455559	20.0
Mark learns that Earvin is prejudiced against Koreans when Mark puts a Korean boy on the basketball team.
31	9	"The Prince of Soul"	John Rago & John Bowab	Cooper James	November 19, 1993	455560	22.7
When a man claiming to be an African prince proposes to Vanessa, Mark convinces her that the man is a clever thief trying to cheat them out of their home.
32	10	"Air Cooper"	John Bowab	Perry Rein & Gigi McCreery	November 26, 1993	455558	16.5
When an advertising executive selects Mark to star in a commercial for athletic shoes, Mark misunderstands the part he is to play.
33	11	"Santa's Got a Brand New Bag"	John Rago	Cooper James	December 10, 1993	455562	18.5
Mark and Geneva are saddened when Nicole stops believing in Santa. Then a mysterious cousin visits who knows how to make Nicole happy.
34	12	"Private School"	Jim Drake	Harry Dunn	December 17, 1993	455561	18.0
Mark is assigned to teach Black history at an expensive private school for one week. When the principal offers him a job at a much higher salary, Mark has a big decision to make.
35	13	"For Whom the Heck the Bell Tolls"	Jim Drake	Bryan Winter	January 7, 1994	455563	23.1
Not wanting to admit that he can't remember a recently deceased basketball coach, Mark agrees to give the eulogy at his funeral.
36	14	"It's My Party and I'll Die If I Want To"	John Randle	Dan Cross & David Hoge	January 21, 1994	455565	20.4
It is almost Mark's 30th birthday; Tyler discovers a lump on Mark; after a misunderstanding between Mark and his doctor, Mark believes that he is dying; he goes skydiving and gives away his stuff.
37	15	"The Courtship of Mark Cooper"	Rita Rogers Blye	Myra J.	January 28, 1994	455566	19.2
Mark is in the midst of defending himself in court when he realizes the plaintiff's lawyer is an ex-girlfriend he dumped brutally.
38	16	"Wedding Bell Blues"	Jim Drake	Efrem Seeger	February 4, 1994	455564	19.1
When Mark's demanding employer, P.J., tells him she is going to marry her old boyfriend and quit her job, Mark has to decide if he should tell her a secret that could make her cancel the wedding. Guest star: Queen Latifah and performs "Just Another Day."
39	17	"Truth or Consequences"	John Bowab	Harry Dunn	February 11, 1994	455567	19.9
Mark and Vanessa make a bet on who can go the longest without telling a lie.
40	18	"Trading Places"	John Bowab	Leilani Downer	February 18, 1994	455568	17.9
When Vanessa applies for a job at a conservative Christian radio station, she tells the manager that Mark is her husband and Geneva is her wild cousin.
41	19	"Pros and Convicts"	Shelley Jensen	David Hoge	March 4, 1994	455569	18.5
When Vanessa shows Geneva how to have a good time, Geneva hits on a police officer who mistakes them both as prostitutes. They both are arrested, and Mark is arrested while trying to bail them out of jail.
42	20	"Double Cheeseburger, Hold the Diploma"	John Bowab	Story by : Mark Curry; Teleplay by : Cooper James	March 18, 1994	455571	18.7
P.J. threatens to discharge Mark when his student, Earvin, quits school. Geneva can't afford to buy a new bicycle for her daughter, Nicole.
43	21	"Groom and Doom"	Chip Hurd	Charlene Seeger	May 13, 1994	455572	16.7
Mark introduces Geneva to a college teacher who asks her to marry him.
44	22	"Hangin' with Mrs. Cooper"	John Bowab	Susan Seeger	May 20, 1994	455570	15.6
Mark plots to reunite his parents after his mother, Dorothy (Ja'net DuBois), leaves her husband of 35 years and moves in with Mark. Guest star: Richard Roundtree

=== Season 3 (1994–1995) ===
No. overall	No. in season	Title	Directed by	Written by	Original release date	Prod. code	U.S. viewers (millions)
45	1	"Call Me Irresponsible"	Mark Linn-Baker	Jeffrey Duteil	September 23, 1994	456401	19.0
Mark avoids P.J.'s phone calls and learns, too late, that she had good news. Geneva plays a trick on Vanessa to teach Nicole a lesson.
46	2	"My Bodyguard"	Mark Linn-Baker	David Hoge & Dan Cross	September 30, 1994	456403	19.1
Mark teaches Tyler how to be a tough guy so that he can protect Nicole from a bully at school. When Tyler's approach doesn't work, Geneva goes up to the school and makes a big scene, scaring the bully away. Vanessa takes care of her boss' prized orchid.
47	3	"Between Friends"	Mark Linn-Baker	B. Mark Seabrooks	October 7, 1994	456402	16.4
Mark and a former college buddy embark upon an all-out competition: first with wrestling, then with women. Vanessa finally manages to get a job answering phones at a doctor's office.
48	4	"He Said, She Said"	Mark Linn-Baker	Efrem Seeger	October 14, 1994	456404	17.0
Geneva fights with the video store clerk who claims that she never returned the "Mrs. Doubtfire" tape. Just after mailing a letter to the senator concerning the tape, the kids find it. Mark dates a woman from Vanessa's wishes. When Mark breaks up with her, Vanessa is kicked out of the carpool.
49	5	"Matinee"	Mark Linn-Baker	Jeffrey Duteil	October 21, 1994	456407	16.9
When he takes Nicole and her friends to the theater, Mark disrupts the movie. Geneva makes 300 penguins for the school's decoration committee.
50	6	"Mo' Money"	Mark Linn-Baker	Vanessa Middleton	October 28, 1994	456405	19.2
Mark almost gets fired when he buys a vending machine for the school to profit off of the sales. The bus that Vanessa is riding gets hijacked.
51	7	"Instant Replay"	Mark Linn-Baker	Gigi McCreery & Perry Rein	November 4, 1994	456406	20.5
Mark reluctantly plays basketball with former classmate Reggie Wilson (played by Indiana Pacers superstar guard Reggie Miller), now an NBA star. Vanessa connives to go on a date with Reggie.
52	8	"House Guest"	Mark Linn-Baker	Efrem Seeger	November 11, 1994	456408	18.3
P.J. has a fight with his mother and moves out of the home they share and into Mark's home.
53	9	"My Achy Breaky Back"	Mark Linn-Baker	David Hoge & Dan Cross	November 18, 1994	456410	19.8
In order to go on an important coaching interview after he hurts his back, Mark undergoes some experimental treatment for the pain at the doctor's office where Vanessa works. After the treatment, Mark suddenly experiences random muscle spasms, where disastrous results occur. Guest star: Mark Linn-Baker
54	10	"True Romance"	Mark Linn-Baker	Vanessa Middleton	November 25, 1994	456411	16.0
Vanessa finds out her new boyfriend is not as rich as he wants her to believe. Tyler asks Mark for advice on girls.
55	11	"Clothes Make the Man"	Mark Linn-Baker	B. Mark Seabrooks	December 2, 1994	456409	19.3
Vanessa rescues Steve and Mark when are tricked into buying new expensive clothes from a beautiful saleswoman who tells them they are very attractive and wants them to model in a calendar. Geneva is convinced Nicole is a future chess champion.
56	12	"Christmas Show"	Mark Linn-Baker	Perry Rein & Gigi McCreery	December 16, 1994	456412	16.9
Mark's job as Santa at the mall and his Christmas plans at home both fail miserably, but the Christmas spirit triumphs.
57	13	"Coach"	Mark Linn-Baker	Jeffrey Duteil	January 6, 1995	456413	19.9
Mark becomes the new head coach of the undefeated basketball team after Coach Corley quits. He starts to think that he doesn't have what it takes to be a winning coach when the team loses their very first game under his coaching.
58	14	"One is the Loneliest Number"	Mark Linn-Baker	Efrem Seeger	January 13, 1995	456414	17.4
After Mark and Denise's break-up. Mark discovers that he really does love her and jumps through hoops to get her back. Nicole and Tyler work together selling candy bars in an effort to win the prize for the most sold, a CD player.
59	15	"True Lies"	Mark Linn-Baker	Casey Maxwell Clair	January 27, 1995	456415	17.0
In order to be with his girlfriend, Mark lies to Nicole. Mark allows Nicole to punish him after she realizes that he lied. But soon he is tempted to lie to her again.
60	16	"The Ringer"	Mark Linn-Baker	Scott Spencer Gorden	February 3, 1995	456418	19.0
As the new coach of Nicole's floundering all-girl tee-ball team, Mark conspires to dress Tyler up as a girl to help the team. Guest stars: Frank Robinsion and Albert Belle
61	17	"Down in the Dumps"	Mark Linn-Baker	Dan Cross & David Hoge	February 10, 1995	456416	18.4
Mark and Vanessa think that they won the lottery but can't find their winning ticket.
62	18	"Hero"	Mark Linn-Baker	Jeffrey Duteil	February 17, 1995	456417	17.1
Mark becomes a local hero but an awards ceremony reveals the truth. Elihu Harris, the mayor of Oakland, guest stars as himself in his acting debut. Dick Clark also appears as himself. Note: Outtakes from the episode are shown during the end credits, making it the only episode to have them.
63	19	"Here Comes the Groom"	Mark Linn-Baker	Efrem Seeger	February 24, 1995	456419	18.9
Mark's good advice to Earvin about romance somehow causes Earvin to elope with his new girlfriend and Earvin's mother wants Mark to stop the couple.
64	20	"The Matchmaker"	Mark Linn-Baker	David Hoge & Dan Cross	April 28, 1995	456421	16.3
Geneva's crazy Aunt Eunetta (also played by Saundra Quarterman) comes to visit and decides that roommates Mark and Vanessa would be the perfect couple. Nicole is upset when Tyler and his friend won't let her play in their boys-only clubhouse.
65	21	"Guys' Night Out"	Mark Linn-Baker	Vanessa Middleton	May 5, 1995	456420	16.1
Mark tries to help Geneva's boyfriend become a part of his group of male friends with disastrous results. Nicole hides a stray cat in her room, but Vanessa is allergic to cats.
66	22	"High Hopes"	Mark Linn-Baker	Barry O'Brien & Cheryl Alu	May 12, 1995	456422	14.3
It looks like Mark, Geneva, and Vanessa may all be leaving Oakland forever due to some unexpected surprises good and bad in this season finale cliffhanger. Note: Final appearance of Nell Carter as P.J. Moore.

=== Season 4 (1995–1996) ===
No. overall	No. in season	Title	Directed by	Written by	Original release date	Prod. code	U.S. viewers (millions)
67	1	"Together Again"	Mark Linn-Baker	Barry O'Brien & Cheryl Alu	September 22, 1995	457251	19.4
Mark, Vanessa, and Geneva return to Oakland after their plans go awry. Geneva gets promoted to high school principal and wonders if she should rehire Mark. Note: Omar Gooding is promoted to main cast in season 4.
68	2	"It's a Matter of Principal"	Mark Linn-Baker	David Chambers	September 29, 1995	457252	17.4
Mark takes advantage of Geneva's position as high school principal. Vanessa refuses to return her wedding gifts, which gives Nicole and Tyler a naughty idea.
69	3	"R.O.T.C."	Mark Linn-Baker	Vanessa Middleton	October 13, 1995	457255	14.0
Mark becomes the faculty advisor for a student military program and learns that war games are no fun.
70	4	"E.R."	Mark Linn-Baker	Michael Anthony Snowden	October 20, 1995	457257	14.2
When Mark injures himself, Vanessa proves her medical skills.
71	5	"Halloween"	Mark Linn-Baker	David Chambers	October 27, 1995	457258	16.6
Nicole dares Tyler to stay all night in a haunted house on Halloween.
72	6	"Ghost in the Machine"	Mark Linn-Baker	B. Mark Seabrooks	November 3, 1995	457259	14.7
Nicole feels guilty about lying and learns a lesson from a dream. Guest star: Julius "Dr. J" Erving
73	7	"Waterworld"	Mark Linn-Baker	Shari Hearn & Kevin White	November 10, 1995	457256	15.8
Mark's stubborn attempts to fix the plumbing fail miserably.
74	8	"I Remember Grandpa"	Mark Linn-Baker	Barry O'Brien & Cheryl Alu	November 17, 1995	457260	16.4
Mark has to go clean his grandfather's cabin, and he and Geneva realize they have different memories of the place. Mark Curry plays a dual role as Mark and his grandfather.
75	9	"R.E.S.P.E.C.T."	Mark Linn-Baker	Kevin White & Shari Hearn	December 1, 1995	457262	15.0
Geneva and Vanessa move out when Mark treats them poorly, but he soon learns what it feels like.
76	10	"The Great Pretender"	Mark Linn-Baker	Dan Cross & David Hoge	December 8, 1995	457254	12.1
Mark uses Vanessa's medical shoulder brace to get sympathy from a beautiful woman, but the charade gets out of control.
77	11	"Christmas '95"	Mark Linn-Baker	Michael Anthony Snowden	December 15, 1995	457264	16.3
A trip to a nostalgic tree farm is ruined for Mark and his friends until they all learn the true meaning of Christmas.
78	12	"Increase the Peace"	Mark Linn-Baker	David Hoge & Dan Cross	January 5, 1996	457261	17.5
Earvin is challenged by a gang member, and Mark intervenes. Note: at the end of the episode, Mark Curry address the dangers of gang violence.
79	13	"Robo Golf"	Mark Linn-Baker	Vanessa Middleton	January 12, 1996	457263	17.8
Mark makes a risky investment. Guest star: Mark Linn-Baker
80	14	"Coach Counselor"	Mark Linn-Baker	B. Mark Seabrooks	January 19, 1996	457253	15.3
Mark loses his office and Geneva promises him another for a price.
81	15	"Talent Show"	Mark Linn-Baker	Richard Dubin	February 2, 1996	457265	14.4
Mark's a hero when he gets a famous musical group to promise to perform at the school carnival until they fail to show up. Guest star: Tyrese as Darrell.
82	16	"Globetrotters"	Mark Linn-Baker	David Chambers	February 9, 1996	457268	14.6
The Harlem Globetrotters (themselves) are playing in town, but Mark might have to miss them.
83	17	"Rivals"	Mark Linn-Baker	B. Mark Seabrooks	February 16, 1996	457266	15.8
Mark's competition with a rival coach escalates to a life-threatening degree. Guest star: Jamie Foxx
84	18	"The Curse"	Mark Linn-Baker	Jonathan Bock	February 23, 1996	457267	16.2
Mark doesn't believe the great car he just bought is haunted until bad luck starts happening to him and everyone around him.
85	19	"Grumpy Old Man"	Mark Linn-Baker	Kevin White & Shari Hearn	March 8, 1996	457269	13.9
Mark plays matchmaker to an elderly couple so he can buy a classic car. Geneva worries that no one on the faculty likes her.
86	20	"True Confessions"	Mark Linn-Baker	Dan Cross & David Hoge	April 26, 1996	457270	13.3
When Vanessa dates a successful, handsome man (Willie Gault), Mark has an unexpected reaction.
87	21	"Breaking Up is Hard to Do"	Tom Rickard	Vanessa Middleton	May 3, 1996	457271	11.7
Mark and Vanessa date each other, but their relationship encounters trouble immediately.
88	22	"Will She or Won't She?"	Joel Zwick	Barry O'Brien & Cheryl Alu	May 10, 1996	457272	11.9
Mark mistakenly thinks that Eric has proposed to Vanessa so he asks her to marry him. Mark revokes the proposal when he discovers his mistake, but proposes to her again seriously on a scoreboard at an NBA game. Tim Hardaway and Gary Payton guest stars. Note: After this episode, the show went on a year-long hiatus.

=== Season 5 (1997) ===
No. overall	No. in season	Title	Directed by	Written by	Original release date	Prod. code	U.S. viewers (millions)
89	1	"The Ring"	Tom Rickard	David Chambers	June 21, 1997	465601	4.87
After convincing Vanessa to marry him, Mark must buy her an engagement ring.
90	2	"Please Don't Go"	Tom Rickard	Dan Cross & David Hoge	June 28, 1997	465602	3.97
As Mark and Vanessa plan their wedding, Geneva has an unexpected reaction.
91	3	"The In-Laws"	Jim Drake	Shari Hearn	July 5, 1997	465603	5.64
Mark competes for the respect of Vanessa's father and loses.
92	4	"Security"	Glynn R. Turman	Michael Antohny Snowden	July 12, 1997	465604	4.87
Mark takes an additional job that might lead to movie stardom.
93	5	"The Spa"	Joel Zwick	Alison Taylor	July 19, 1997	465605	5.14
Mark is jealous when Vanessa goes to a spa where the sexy male employees are eager to please.
94	6	"The Dance"	Joel Zwick	Ralph Greene	August 2, 1997	465606	4.64
Tyler gets some bad romantic advice from Mark.
95	7	"One on One"	Joel Zwick	Cora M. Moncrief	August 9, 1997	465607	5.45
Mark and Tyler learn lessons in respecting women. Guest star: Cheryl Miller
96	8	"The Swami"	Joel Zwick	Dan Cross & David Hoge	August 15, 1997	465608	8.77
Mark works at a carnival pretending to be a fortune-teller to help the school earn money for textbooks, but his fake predictions begin to cause problems.
97	9	"The Argument"	Joel Zwick	Shari Hearn	August 16, 1997	465609	4.58
Vanessa and Mark present opposing versions of an incident until Tyler reveals what really happened.
98	10	"Lifesaver"	Jeffrey Ganz	Alison Taylor	August 22, 1997	465610	9.76
Geneva's boyfriend wants to marry her until Mark meddles in their relationship.
99	11	"The Idol"	Jim Drake	Ralph Greene	August 23, 1997	465611	4.72
Mark introduces Tyler to his favorite rap star, and Tyler learns a lesson about hero worship.
100	12	"Party, Party"	Jim Drake	Dan Cross & David Hoge	August 29, 1997	465612	9.56
Mark and Vanessa spy on each other during their bachelor and bachelorette parties.
101	13	"Getting Personal"	Jim Drake	David Chambers	August 30, 1997	465613	3.84
In the series finale, Mark wears a squirrel costume for his wedding pictures with Vanessa, angering her. Will she cancel the wedding?
