= For Peete's Sake =

American reality television series

- Genre: Reality
- Starring: Holly Robinson Peete; Rodney Peete
- Country of origin: United States
- Original language: English
- No. of seasons: 2
- No. of episodes: 16

Production
- Camera setup: Multiple
- Running time: 42 minutes

Original release
- Network: Oprah Winfrey Network
- Release: March 19, 2016 – April 8, 2017

For Peete's Sake is an American reality television series starring Holly Robinson Peete, Rodney Peete, their four kids, and her mom, Dolores. It premiered on March 19, 2016 on the Oprah Winfrey Network, as part of its Saturday-night reality lineup. On August 8, 2016, the network renewed the show for a second season. On May 10, 2017, Holly announced on her Instagram account that the show was cancelled after two seasons. It would be succeeded by a new reality series on the Hallmark Channel called Meet the Peetes, which premiered in February 2018 and also ran for two seasons.

== Episodes ==
=== Series overview ===
Season	Episodes	Originally released	
Season	Episodes	First released	Last released
1	6	March 19, 2016	May 7, 2016
2	8	February 18, 2017	April 8, 2017

=== Season 1 (2016) ===
No. overall	No. in season	Title	Original release date	U.S. viewers (millions)
1	1	"No Time for Shaggin'"	March 19, 2016	0.63
2	2	"Please Don't Get Caught Twerking"	March 26, 2016	0.33
3	3	"Do I Have Autism Still?"	April 2, 2016	0.38
4	4	"HollyRod or Bust"	April 9, 2016	0.33
5	5	"Black-tress of a Certain Age"	April 16, 2016	0.38
6	6	"There Goes the Neighborhood"	April 23, 2016	0.46
7	7	"Because I Said So"	April 30, 2016	0.47
8	8	"Brain Scans and Changing Plans"	May 7, 2016	0.40

=== Season 2 (2017) ===
No. overall	No. in season	Title	Original release date	U.S. viewers (millions)
9	1	"NYU State of Mind"	February 18, 2017	0.53
10	2	"Next Stop: Philadelphia"	February 25, 2017	0.57
11	3	"Homeschool, Headaches and Mary Jane"	March 4, 2017	0.39
12	4	"Let's Talk About Sex"	March 11, 2017	0.43
13	5	"RJ Takes the Wheel"	March 18, 2017	0.38
14	6	"Meeting of the Minds"	March 25, 2017	N/A
15	7	"From Boys to Men"	April 1, 2017	N/A
16	8	"Citizen Peete"	April 8, 2017	N/A
