= Meet the Peetes =

American reality TV series

- Genre: Reality
- Starring: Holly Robinson Peete; Rodney Peete
- Country of origin: United States
- Original language: English
- No. of seasons: 2
- No. of episodes: 20

Production
- Executive producers: Colleen Needles Steward; Shannon Keenan Demers; Holly Robinson Peete; Rodney Peete; Heidi Dahmen; Kyell Thomas
- Camera setup: Multiple
- Running time: 42 minutes
- Production company: Tremendous! Entertainment

Original release
- Network: Hallmark Channel
- Release: February 18, 2018 – April 29, 2019

Meet the Peetes is an American reality television series starring Holly Robinson Peete, Rodney Peete, their four children, and her mother, Dolores. The series is Hallmark Channel's first entry into unscripted reality television. The Peete family had previously starred in For Peete's Sake for two seasons (2016–2017) on the Oprah Winfrey Network.

The series premiered on February 18, 2018, as part of Hallmark Channel's Sunday-night programming. On March 21, 2018, Hallmark announced the show's renewal for a second season. Amid other Sunday-night programming changes, Meet the Peetes moved to Monday nights in season two beginning with episode four on March 18, 2019. The cancellation of the series was announced in May 2019.

== Cast ==
- Holly Robinson Peete, actress, singer, and mother
- Rodney Peete, husband, father, and former NFL football player
- Dolores Robinson, Holly's octogenarian mother
- Ryan Elizabeth Peete, daughter and NYU student, twin of Rodney
- Rodney "R.J." Peete Jr, son and Los Angeles Dodgers employee whose autism is frequently featured in the series
- Robinson James Peete, son
- Roman Matthew Peete, son

== Episodes ==
=== Series overview ===
Season	Episodes	Originally released	
Season	Episodes	First released	Last released
1	10	February 18, 2018	April 22, 2018
2	10	February 24, 2019	April 29, 2019

=== Season 1 (2018) ===
No. overall	No. in season	Title	Original release date	U.S. viewers (millions)
1	1	"Let's Get This Party Started"	February 18, 2018	0.705
2	2	"Back to School"	February 25, 2018	0.696
3	3	"The Guilt Trip"	March 4, 2018	0.484
4	4	"A House Divided"	March 11, 2018	0.557
5	5	"Let's Dance"	March 18, 2018	0.609
6	6	"Moving Forward"	March 25, 2018	0.563
7	7	"Jump Street"	April 1, 2018	0.511
8	8	"Women of Wisdom"	April 8, 2018	0.520
9	9	"Facing Fears"	April 15, 2018	0.506
10	10	"The Next Chapter"	April 22, 2018	0.550

Hallmark Channel aired a Meet the Peetes Christmas Special program on December 3, 2018, which had 553 thousand U.S. viewers.

=== Season 2 (2019) ===
No. overall	No. in season	Title	Original release date	U.S. viewers (millions)
11	1	"Taco Bout a Party!"	February 24, 2019	0.646
12	2	"Glamma & Poppy Pop"	March 3, 2019	0.645
13	3	"You're Hired!"	March 10, 2019	0.471
14	4	"Family, Philanthropy & Fun"	March 18, 2019	0.342
15	5	"It's Time to Play Ball"	March 25, 2019	0.329
16	6	"Exercise in Love"	April 1, 2019	0.341
17	7	"Dream Builders"	April 8, 2019	0.354
18	8	"It Runs in the Family"	April 15, 2019	0.332
19	9	"A Stroll Down Memory Lane"	April 22, 2019	0.350
20	10	"Berlin or Bust!"	April 29, 2019	N/A

== Production ==
The series was produced by Tremendous! Entertainment and had as its executive producers: Colleen Needles Steward, Shannon Keenan Demers, Holly Robinson Peete, Rodney Peete, Heidi Dahmen, and Kyell Thomas.
