= HollyRod Foundation =

Holly Robinsons Foundation
- Type: Nonprofit organization
- Founded: 1997
- Founder: Holly Robinson Peete; Rodney Peete
- Headquarters: 9250 Wilshire Blvd; Beverly Hills, CA 90212
- Key people: Holly Robinson Peete (Co-Founder); Rodney Peete (Co-Founder); Wallis Annenberg (Board of Directors)
- Website: www.hollyrod.org

HollyRod Foundation is a nonprofit organization founded by actress Holly Robinson Peete and retired NFL quarterback Rodney Peete that provides "medical, physical, and emotional support" to individuals living with Parkinson's disease as well as families of children with autism. The HollyRod4kids initiative assists families affected by autism through providing resources to help improve the lives of children diagnosed with the disorder. Concurrently, the foundation provides aid for Parkinson's Disease patients through its HollyRod Compassionate Care Program in partnership with the Center for Parkinson's Research and Movement Disorders located at the University of Southern California's Keck School of Medicine.

== History ==
Former NFL quarterback Rodney Peete and his wife, actress Holly Robinson Peete, established the HollyRod Foundation in 1997 in honor of Holly's father, late actor and television producer Matt Robinson, who died of Parkinson's disease in 2002. He had been living with the disease since the age of 46. As it began to progress, the symptoms began to affect Robinson's ability to complete certain tasks in his daily life. Rodney, Holly, and the rest of their family stepped in to support him. During the time period of caring for her father, Peete and her husband became inspired to help others suffering from the disease who lacked the financial means to pay for the associated costs. With this motive in mind, the HollyRod Foundation came into inception.

In 2000, after the Peetes' oldest son (3 years old at the time), Rodney 'RJ' Peete Jr., was diagnosed with autism, the HollyRod Foundation expanded its mission to bring awareness to this issue. Holly Robinson Peete has since become a recognizable international advocate for autism causes. She and her family have appeared on behalf of the HollyRod Foundation on various television shows, events, and print media including The Oprah Winfrey Show, World Autism Awareness Day events, People magazine, and others, to share their personal story of how autism has affected their lives and to bring awareness to the issue.

In 2003, The HollyRod Foundation partnered with Target Corporation. In 2007, Anheuser-Busch pledged $200,000 to HollyRod over the following two years. At the time the donation was the largest single contribution the organization had ever received.

In 2010, co-founder Holly Robinson Peete became a candidate on the reality television series The Celebrity Apprentice 3 to raise money for the HollyRod Foundation. At the time of the season finale, Peete had raised the most money for her charity in Celebrity Apprentice history. However, she was not hired by Donald Trump in the finale and finished second to musician Bret Michaels, but earned $597,893 USD to benefit HollyRod.

== Programs and events ==
=== HollyRod Parkinson's Compassionate Care Program ===
HollyRod Parkinson's Compassionate Care Program was formed in 2002 in collaboration with Keck School of Medicine of USC's Center for Parkinson's Research and Movement Disorders. Through this partnership the foundation assists PD patients with little or no medical insurance coverage in obtaining medications, treatments, medical equipment, and various services. Currently the program is available only to patients residing in the Greater Los Angeles Area.

=== HollyRod4kids ===
HollyRod4kids was established in 2000 in response to Rodney Peete and Holly Robinson Peete's son's autism diagnosis. The initiative's main mission is helping the families of children with autism gain access to affordable treatments and therapies. In 2008, VH1 Classic's Rock Autism joined forces with HollyRod4kids to raise funds and awareness for autism through hosting a celebrity bowl-off and silent auction.

During the 2010 season finale of the Celebrity Apprentice, Snapple donated $250,000 to the HollyRod Foundation to benefit families of children with autism in addition to launching a limited release of Robinson Peete's handcrafted Snapple Compassionberry Tea. Holly along with her daughter Ryan wrote the fictional children's book, My Brother Charlie, which centers around growing up with an autistic twin sibling. It is slightly based on Ryan Peete's experience of having an autistic twin brother. In March 2010, Rodney Peete released a book titled Not My Boy! A Father, a Son, and One Family’s Journey with Autism. In the book Rodney Peete gives his perspective as a father raising a son with special needs. A percentage of the proceeds from both books will go to HollyRod4kids.

HollyRod4kids recently began its "Giving Words Campaign" to donate communication software and hardware to non-verbal or minimally verbal autistic children who meet certain eligibility requirements.

HollyRod4kids is currently developing the Compassionate Care Center for Autism in Los Angeles that will provide support services for autistic children and their families. To coincide with the center's opening, HollyRod is also launching a national grant program to assist families living outside of Los Angeles. Current plans have the opening date for the facility and launch of the grant program in "late 2012, early 2013."

=== DesignCare ===
DesignCare, formerly DesignCure, is an annual fundraising event that raises money for the HollyRod Foundation. Its guests and honorees range from people in the entertainment, medical, and business industry to individuals and families affected by autism and Parkinson's disease. Each year DesignCare honors people with special awards like the 'Matthew T. Robinson Award of Courage', 'HollyRod Media Hero Award', 'HollyRod4kids Champion Award', 'HollyRod Media Award', 'HollyRod Founders Award', and 'Humanitarian Award'. The 'HollyRod4kids Champion Award' is presented to "people who have been an inspiration to teens with autism." Past celebrity honorees have included: Michael J. Fox, Donald Trump, and Muhammad Ali.

In 2009, DesignCare raised over $350,000 and more than $500,000 the following year. Since DesignCare began, it has helped the HollyRod Foundation earn over $2 million to help improve the lives of those living with Parkinson's disease and autistic children.
