= Call Me D-Nice =

Studio album by D-Nice
- Released: July 24, 1990
- Recorded: 1989–1990
- Studio: Battery (New York, U.S.)
- Genre: Hip hop
- Length: 38:16
- Label: Jive
- Producer: D-Nice; Carl Bourelly (co.); Sidney Mills (co.)

D-Nice chronology
Call Me D-Nice (1990)	To tha Rescue (1991)

Professional ratings
Review scores
Source	Rating
AllMusic	4/5 stars
RapReviews	7/10
The Source	3.5/5 stars

Call Me D-Nice is the debut studio album by American rapper D-Nice. It was released in 1990 via Jive Records and produced primarily by D-Nice. The album peaked at number 75 on the Billboard 200 and number 12 on the Top R&B/Hip-Hop Albums chart. Its self-titled lead single peaked at number one on the Hot Rap Songs chart and number 19 on the Hot R&B/Hip-Hop Songs chart, and the second single "Crumbs on the Table" also peaked at number 17 on the Hot Rap Songs chart.

== Track listing ==
No.	Title	Producer(s)	Length
1.	"Crumbs on the Table"	D-Nice	4:04
2.	"Call Me D-Nice"	D-Nice	3:47
3.	"Glory"	D-Nice; Carl Bourelly (co.)	3:56
4.	"The TR 808 Is Coming"	D-Nice	3:41
5.	"Under Some Budda"	D-Nice; Sidney Mills (co.)	4:29
6.	"It's Over" (featuring Dawnn Lewis)	D-Nice; Carl Bourelly (co.)	4:57
7.	"A Few Dollars More"	D-Nice	4:08
8.	"It's All About Me"	D-Nice	3:36
9.	"Pimp of the Year"	D-Nice	2:36
10.	"And You Don't Stop"	D-Nice	3:02
Total length:			38:16

Sample credits

- Track 1 contains samples from: "Crumbs off the Table" by Laura Lee, "Operator's Choice", "Comic Shop", and "Saturday Night Style" by Mikey Dread
- Track 2 contains samples from: "Buzzsaw" by the Turtles and "(This Is) Detroit Soul" by Paul Nero
- Track 3 contains samples from: "Take the Money and Run" by Steve Miller Band
- Track 4 contains samples from: "Mama Told Me (Not to Come)" by Three Dog Night
- Track 5 contains samples from: "I Meant to Do That" from Pee-wee's Big Adventure
- Track 6 contains samples from: "Action (LP Version)" by Orange Krush, "This Is Something for the Radio" by Biz Markie
- Track 7 contains samples from: "Square Business" by Blue Mitchell
- Track 8 contains samples from: "Mind Power" by James Brown
- Track 9 contains samples from: "A Gritty Nitty" by the Pazant Brothers and the Beaufort Express, "Super Hoe" by Boogie Down Productions
- Track 10 contains samples from: "Tales of Taboo" by Karen Finley

== Personnel ==
- Derrick Jones - vocals, producer, mixing
- Dawnn Lewis - vocals (track 6)
- Carl Bourelly - co-producer (tracks: 3, 6)
- Sidney Miller - co-producer (track 5)
- Barbera Aimes - engineer
- Dwayne Sumal - engineer
- Anthony Saunders - assistant engineer
- Eric Gast - assistant engineer
- Peter Christensen - assistant engineer
- Tim Latham - assistant engineer
- Barbara Catanzaro-Hearn - photography
- John Mahdessian - photography

== Charts ==
Album

Chart (1990)	Peak position
US Billboard 200	75
US Billboard Top R&B/Hip-Hop Albums	12

Singles

Year	Song	Peak position	
Year	Song	Hot R&B/Hip-Hop Songs	Hot Rap Songs
1989	"Call Me D-Nice"	19	1
1990	"Crumbs on the Table"	—	17
