= The Poof Point =

2001 television film directed by Neal Israel

- Promotional poster
- Based on: The Poof Point by Ellen Weiss & Mel Friedman
- Written by: Stu Krieger
- Directed by: Neal Israel
- Starring: Tahj Mowry; Raquel Lee; Dawnn Lewis; Mark Curry; Ryan Seaman
- Theme music composer: Christopher Brady
- Country of origin: United States
- Original language: English

Production
- Producer: Don Schain
- Cinematography: Robert Seaman
- Editor: Lee Haxall
- Running time: 90 minutes
- Production company: The Bedford Falls Company

Original release
- Network: Disney Channel
- Release: September 14, 2001

The Poof Point is a 2001 American science fiction comedy film released as a Disney Channel Original Movie, based on the children's novel The Poof Point by Ellen Weiss and Mel Friedman. The film premiered on Disney Channel on September 14, 2001.

== Plot ==
Two 40-year-old scientists, Norton (Mark Curry) and Marigold Ballard (Dawnn Lewis), invent a time machine. On one of their test runs, they attempt to send two goldfish into the 1860s. Their dog Einstein unknowingly tampers with the machine and a critical component known as the "vector modulator" falls out, causing it to not function properly. Instead of sending the goldfish into the past, the goldfish are "de-aged" until the point before they were born, known as the "Poof Point." Norton and Marigold are unaware of this as they leave to attend the graduation of their children, Eddie (Tahj Mowry) and Marie (Raquel Lee), who are embarrassed by their parents' attempts at socializing and feel disconnected from them. Eddie has also expressed interest in joining a band called the Urban Slugs, which he will audition for at his house.

The two scientists decide to perform the goldfish experiment again, but the machine's particle beam is accidentally redirected to them. Eddie and Marie come in and notice that their parents have mentally reverted to the age of 21 and believe that they are in the 1980s when they were still designing the time machine in college. Norton and Marigold realize that this was the effect of the malfunctioning time machine and start trying to fix it. But then they revert again to 14-year-olds, when they had no knowledge of the time machine they had constructed and were not in love yet. They discuss their social life as teenagers with their children but later wander off from home. At a diner, Marigold tells Chloe, a girl known for spreading rumors and gossip, that the Urban Slugs are playing at Eddie's house. Believing that this is a party and not an audition, Chloe starts inviting many kids over.

Eddie and Marie try to handle the situation, discovering that the problem with the machine is the missing vector modulator before their parents regress further into acting and dressing like 7-year-olds. The party ends after a few neighbors complain to the police about the rowdiness. However, time is running out and the children need to find the missing part and activate the machine before their parents disappear forever. This is complicated when Norton and Marigold become 2-year-olds who keep making messes, running off, and doing everything they can to cause trouble and not go into the machine to return to their normal age. The vector modulator is eventually found and the children get them into the machine right on the verge of poofing away and save their lives. After having learned that their parents were just like them as teenagers, they start to bond more.

== Cast ==
- Tahj Mowry as Edison Newton "Eddie" Ballard
- Raquel Lee as Marie Curie Ballard
- Mark Curry as Norton Ballard
- Dawnn Lewis as Marigold Ballard
- Jan Felt as Corky
- Haley McCormick as Lizzie
- Karl Wilson as Mr. Paul
- Laura Summer as Computer Voice
- Ryan Seaman as Gabe
- Peter Van Dyke as Eddie's Double
