= Dawnn Lewis =

American actress and singer (born 1961)

- Lewis at Dragon Con in 2026
- Born: Dawnn Jewel Lewis; August 13, 1961 (age 65); New York City, U.S.
- Education: University of Miami (BM)
- Occupation: Actress
- Years active: 1985–present
- Spouse: Johnny Newman (m. 2004; div. 2006)
- Awards: 1990, 1991, 1992 – BMI TV Music Award (A Different World)
- Website: dawnnlewis.com

Dawnn Jewel Lewis (born August 13, 1961) is an American actress. She is known for her role as Jaleesa Vinson–Taylor on the NBC television sitcom A Different World from the series beginning in 1987 until the end of its fifth season in 1992 (she also co-wrote the opening theme song for the series), as well as her many roles in other TV series and in film.

Lewis's other notable roles include portraying Robin Dumars on the ABC sitcom Hangin' with Mr. Cooper for its first season (1992–93), as Cheryl Spade in the 1988 film I'm Gonna Git You Sucka, and as Captain Carol Freeman on the animated series Star Trek: Lower Decks. Since then, Lewis has appeared in numerous TV series, including other sitcoms, and has also performed on stage.

== Early life and education ==
Dawnn Lewis was born on August 13, 1961, in Brooklyn, New York City, to Carl and Joyce Lewis, who are of African-American and Guyanese descent. She began singing at the age of four and acting at eleven. At sixteen, Lewis graduated from the High School of Music & Art in New York City. In college, she majored in musical theatre with a minor in journalism, graduating with a Bachelor of Music degree, cum laude, from the University of Miami in Coral Gables, Florida, in 1982.

== Career ==
=== The Tap Dance Kid National Tour (1985–1986) ===
From August 1, 1985, to July 6, 1986, Lewis performed in the chorus and as the character Dulcie in the National Tour of the Broadway musical The Tap Dance Kid under the name "Dawnn J. Lewis".

=== A Different World (1987–1992) ===
Lewis appeared in the first five of six seasons of A Different World as Jaleesa Vinson (later Vinson–Taylor), from 1987 until 1992. Lewis co-wrote the theme song to A Different World, with Bill Cosby and Stu Gardner, and co-performed the song for the first season. Although her character was married to another of the main characters on the show, her character disappeared from the series without explanation, similar to the Chuck Cunningham character in Happy Days. Lewis appeared in a special week-long segment of A Different World called the Hillman College Reunion airing on Nick at Nite, along with Lisa Bonet, Jasmine Guy, Kadeem Hardison, Darryl M. Bell, Cree Summer, and Sinbad. On her Super Password appearance in 1988, she was paired with Dallas star Ken Kercheval, not any of her co-stars.

=== Hangin' with Mr. Cooper (1992–1993) ===
In September 1992, Lewis began starring in ABC's Hangin' with Mr. Cooper alongside Mark Curry and Holly Robinson. Lewis appeared in 20 of the 22 episodes of the first season as Robin Dumars, Mark's childhood best friend and roommate. Lewis did not appear on the two shows concurrently – she left A Different World to star in Hangin' with Mr. Cooper. Lewis and Holly Robinson, along with R&B quartet En Vogue, performed the theme song for season one of Hangin' with Mr. Cooper. Sometime before the end of season one, the show producers decided to scale back on the updated version of the 1970s ABC sitcom Three's Company concept. Lewis left the show after the conclusion of the first season due to the producers deciding to change the direction of the show, replacing her character with a mother and child; Mark's cousin Geneva Lee (portrayed by Saundra Quarterman) and her daughter Nicole (portrayed by Raven-Symoné).

=== Other work ===
Lewis provided additional voices in the video game, True Crime: New York City. She portrayed Deloris Van Cartier in Peter Schneider's Sister Act the Musical, which opened at the Pasadena Playhouse on October 24, 2006. Lewis has voiced Storm of the X-Men in three games, most recently Marvel: Ultimate Alliance 2. She also voiced Granny Grim on The Grim Adventures of Billy & Mandy, and voiced the female Shokan (Sheeva) in Mortal Kombat: Defenders of the Realm. Lewis has also done voice work as LaBarbara Conrad, wife of Hermes Conrad, in the animated TV series Futurama, Detective Terri Lee on Spider-Man: The Animated Series, villainess Di Archer on Bruno the Kid, and voiced a number of characters on The Boondocks. Additionally, she voiced the character Sharona on King of the Hill.

Lewis co-starred in two Disney Channel Original Movies, The Poof Point as Marigold Ballord, and as Gail DeBarge in Let It Shine. In 2000, Lewis played Blabberwort the Troll in the five-episode NBC miniseries The 10th Kingdom.

=== 2006–present ===
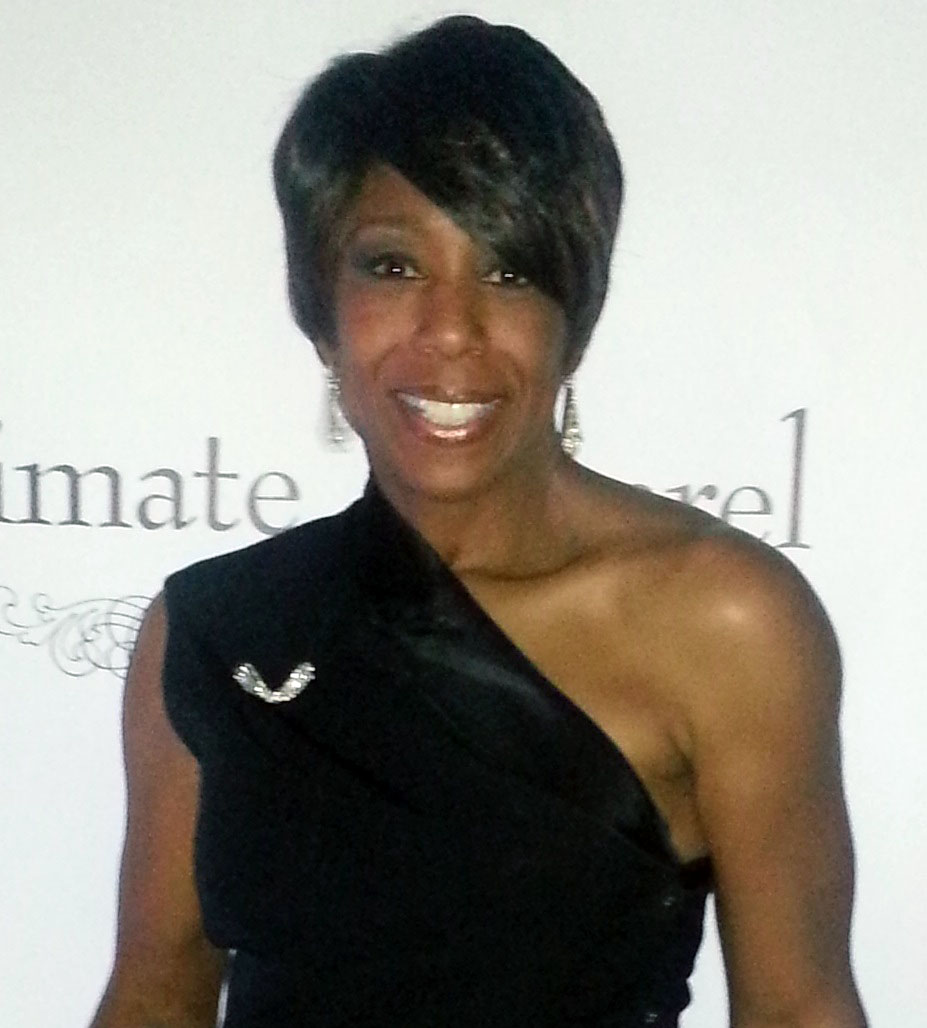
Lewis in 2012

In 2006, Lewis starred as Melba Early in the film adaptation of Dreamgirls. Lewis released her debut CD, entitled Worth Waiting For, in 2006. She played Addaperle in The Wiz with New York City Center's Encores! In 2009, Lewis played Denise Fields on One Tree Hill. In 2010, Lewis played a minor recurring role as Lauren's mother in The Secret Life of the American Teenager. In 2012, she voiced Malora in Strange Frame. She also appeared as Dr. Knapp on Days of Our Lives in 2012–2013. In 2014 Lewis starred in The Divorce along with Vanessa Bell Calloway, Tatyana Ali & Freda Payne. In 2014, she started a recurring role that ran the final four seasons of Major Crimes as Patrice, a love interest and later wife of Lt. Provenza, whom he met during a case. In that same year, she also voiced Ruby's mother Helen Hanshaw in one episode of Sofia The First.

In March 2016, Lewis was cast in Disney Junior's animated series Doc McStuffins as the voice of Grandma McStuffins. In 2017 she provided the voice of Maybelle Mundy in the film Bunyan and Babe. In 2018 she began voicing Fannie Granger on DreamWorks's Spirit Riding Free and Dr. Jones in Stretch Armstrong and the Flex Fighters, while in 2019 began voicing The Chief on Netflix's animated Carmen Sandiego. She voiced Attorney General's special agent Lenora Carter in The Simpsons episode "The Fat Blue Line" in 2019, and became the voice of Bernice Hibbert starting with "Uncut Femmes" in 2021.

From November 2019 to January 2022, she began portrayed Zelma, Tina Turner's mother, in the musical Tina on Broadway.

From August 2020 to December 2024, she starred as the voice of Captain Carol Freeman in the animated series Star Trek: Lower Decks.

From 2021 to 2022, Lewis voiced Ms. Jackie Washington, the Neighborhood Council President of Hansberry Heights, in the animated series Karma's World.

In 2021, Lewis was among the first honorees to be inducted into the Women Songwriters Hall of Fame.

Lewis is an honorary member of the Zeta Phi Beta sorority.

== Filmography ==
=== Film ===
Year	Title	Role	Notes
1988	I'm Gonna Git You Sucka	Cheryl Spade	
1992	Stompin' at the Savoy	Ella Fitzgerald	Television film
1992	Mouse Soup	Bees	Voice, short
1993	A Cool Like That Christmas	Jarvis	Voice, television film
1994	Race to Freedom: The Underground Railroad	Minnie	Television film
1996	The Cherokee Kid	Mary "Stagecoach Mary", Love Gang	Television film
1996	Bruno the Kid: The Animated Movie	Di Archer	Voice, direct-to-video
1997	Bad Day on the Block	Officer Sandy Tierra	
1999	The Wood	Woman In Cleaners	
2001	Nicolas	Unknown Role	
2001	The Poof Point	Marigold Ballard	Television film
2002	Endgame: Ethics and Values in America	Alison	Television film
2003	Charlotte's Web 2: Wilbur's Great Adventure	Bessie / Female Judge	Voice, direct-to-video
2005	The Venom Saga	Detective Terri Lee	Voice, direct-to-video
2006	The Adventures of Brer Rabbit	Mom / Sister Mink	Voice, direct-to-video
2006	Dreamgirls	Melba Early	
2007	The Last Sentinel	Angel, Tallis' Rifle	Voice
2007	Futurama: Bender's Big Score	LaBarbara Conrad	Voice, direct-to-video
2009	Futurama: Into the Wild Green Yonder	LaBarbara Conrad / Women's Prison Warden	Voice, direct-to-video
2010	Preacher's Kid	Mya	
2012	Strange Frame: Love & Sax	Malora	Voice
2012	Let It Shine	Gail DeBarge	Television film
2012	Jennifer	Dr. Fox	Short
2012	Dino Time	Additional Voices	
2013	Second Chances	Maria	Television film
2013	Monsters University	Additional Voices	
2013	Toy Story of Terror!	Delivery Lady	Voice, television film
2013	WHOA! Comedy Short	Kate Sterling	Short
2014	The Divorce	Yolanda Massey	Television film
2014	Mom and Dad Undergrads	Diane	Television film
2015	Megachurch Murder	Lucille Williams	
2015	Inside Out	Additional Voices	
2015	Alone Together	Katie	Short
2017	Bunyan and Babe	Maybelle Mundy	Voice
2017	The Legend of Master Legend	Tana	Television film
2017	Cycle 2017	Robyn	
2018	Revival!	Cleo	
2020	Be the Light	Gladys	
2020	Carmen Sandiego: To Steal or Not to Steal	Chief	Voice, short
2021	The Good, the Bart, and the Loki	Ravonna Renslayer	Voice, short
2021	Writing Around the Christmas Tree	Sharon Samuels	
2022	For Gunter's Eyes Only	Additional Voices	Short
2022	Minions: The Rise of Gru	Additional Voices	
2022	Welcome to the Club	Ursula / Kaa	Voice, short
2022	Blackjack Christmas	Corrine Allen	
2023	Rogue Not Quite One	TIE Interceptor System	Voice, short

=== Television ===
Year	Title	Role	Notes
1987–1992	A Different World	Jaleesa Vinson-Taylor	Main cast: Seasons 1-5
1990	Kid 'n Play	Lela	Voice, main role
1992–1993	Hangin' with Mr. Cooper	Robin Dumars	Main cast: Season 1
1995	ABC Weekend Special	Temba's Sister	Episode: "Jirimpimbira: An African Folk Tale"
1995	Happily Ever After: Fairy Tales for Every Child	Princess Songe	Voice, episode: "The Valiant Little Tailor"
1995	The Savage Dragon	Additional Voices	
1995–1997	Spider-Man: The Animated Series	Detective Terri Lee	
1996	Dream On	Rema Hort	Recurring cast: Season 6
1996	The Faculty	Mrs. Lowman	Episode: "Daisy's Secret"
1996	C Bear and Jamal	Grandma	Voice, recurring role
1996	Mortal Kombat: Defenders of the Realm	Sheeva	Voice, recurring role
1996–1997	Bruno the Kid	Di Archer	Voice, recurring role
1997	The Steve Harvey Show	Alise Peyton	Episode: "Coming to Chicago"
1997	Sliders	Dr. Natalie Sylvius	Episode: "The Breeder"
1997	Die Gang	Stella Tumbrell	Episode: "Das Duell"
1997	The Burning Zone	Dr. Janice Rhodes	Episode: "Elegy for a Dream"
1997	Waynehead	Cheetah	Voice, episode: "Rebel Without a Paw"
1997	The Parent 'Hood	Bernadette	Episode: "Father Wendell"
1997	The Incredible Hulk	Agent Diana	Voice, episode: "Mission: Incredible"
1997–1999	King of the Hill	Sharona Johnson	Voice, guest role (seasons 1 and 3)
1998	The Secret Files of the Spy Dogs	Additional Voices	Episode: "Hair/Homework"
1999	The Jamie Foxx Show	Dr. Kanella	Episode: "Scareder Than a Mug"
1999	Nash Bridges	Winifred Holt	Episode: "Resurrection"
1999	Early Edition	Gayle Clark	Episode: "Number One with a Bullet"
1999–present	Futurama	LaBarbara Conrad, Jackie Anderson, Queen Bee, Chelsea, Coco Charm, Brainormous, Additional Voices	Voice, recurring role
2000	The 10th Kingdom	Blabberwort the Troll	Recurring Cast
2000	Supermodels	Catwalk	Voice, main role
2000	Buzz Lightyear of Star Command	Mary	Voice, episode: "Panic on Bathyos"
2000–2002	Any Day Now	Gail Williams	Recurring cast: Season 3, Guest: Season 4
2001	The Legend of Tarzan	Naoh	Voice, episode: "Tarzan and the Eagle's Feather"
2001–2002	Heavy Gear: The Animated Series	Sonja Briggs	Voice, recurring role
2002	Andy Richter Controls the Universe	Jackie	Episode: "We're All the Same, Only Different"
2002–2007	Grim & Evil	Additional Voices	
2003	Strong Medicine	Detective Wright	Episode: "Risk"
2003	Ozzy & Drix	Cilia Tyson	Voice, episode: "An Out of Body Experience"
2003	Girlfriends	Linda Dent	2 episodes
2004	Static Shock	Brickhouse	Voice, episode: "Army of Darkness"
2004	Medical Investigation	Dr. Burton	Episode: "Little Girl"
2004	NYPD Blue	Jocelyn Barker	Episode: "The 3-H Club"
2005–2014	The Boondocks	Additional Voices	
2006–2007	Holly Hobbie & Friends	Carolyn Baker	Voice, 2 episodes
2007	Handy Manny	Tanya	Voice, episode: "Musica/Ice Cream Team"
2008–2009	One Tree Hill	Denise Fields	Recurring cast: Season 6
2008–2012	The Life & Times of Tim	The Boss' Wife	Voice, guest role (seasons 1-3)
2009–2010	Glenn Martin, DDS	Nurse	Voice, 2 episodes
2010	The Secret Life of the American Teenager	Lauren's Mom	Recurring cast: Seasons 2-3
2010–2012	The Cleveland Show	Additional Voices	
2011	Reed Between the Lines	Trishelle	Episode: "Let's Talk About College Boys"
2012	CSI: Miami	Stacy McCann	Episode: "At Risk"
2012	Breaking In	Janet Jenkins	Episode: "The Blind Sided"
2012–2013	Days of Our Lives	Dr. Knapp	Regular cast
2012–2013	Regular Show	Fun Fun Zone Employee, J.B.	Voice, 2 episodes
2013	The Soul Man	Erica	Recurring cast: Season 2
2013	Turbo Fast	Queen Bananica	Voice, episode: "African Queen"
2014	Castle	Yvonne	Episode: "That '70s Show"
2014	Survivor's Remorse	Vanessa Miller	Episode: "How to Build a Brand"
2014	Tim and Eric's Bedtime Stories	Agent	Episode: "The Endorsement"
2014–2018	Major Crimes	Patrice Perry / Patrice Provenza	Recurring cast: Seasons 3-6
2015	Better Call Saul	Judge	Episode: "Hero"
2015	Sofia the First	Helen Hanshaw	Voice, episode: "Buttercup Amber"
2015	Rick and Morty	Assimilated Alien #1	Voice, episode: "Auto Erotic Assimilation"
2016	Kirby Buckets	Mayor	Episode: "Call of Doodie"
2016	Home: Adventures with Tip & Oh	Guppa	Voice, episode: "Wrinkly Humans People"
2016–2020	Doc McStuffins	April McStuffins	Voice, recurring role
2017	Stitchers	Arlene Grant	Episode: "Dreamland"
2017–present	The Simpsons	Bernice Hibbert (2021-present), Lenora Carter, Additional Voices	
2018	This Is Us	Rosemary	2 episodes
2018	iZombie	Mama "Renegade" Leone	Recurring Cast: Season 4
2018	Stretch Armstrong and the Flex Fighters	Dr. Jones	Voice, episode: "Rise of the Tech Men"
2018	Bravest Warriors	Jeanette	Voice, recurring role (season 4)
2018–2019	Spirit Riding Free	Fannie Granger	Voice, guest role (seasons 1 and 5)
2018–2020	Curious George	Mrs. Parker	Voice, guest role (seasons 10 and 12)
2018–2021	Apple & Onion	Patty, Cinnamon Bun, Croissant	Voice
2019	Veronica Mars	Marcia Langdon	Main Cast: Season 4
2019	Spirit Riding Free: Pony Tales	Fannie Granger	Voice, episode: "The Healing Tree"
2019–2021	Carmen Sandiego	The Chief/Tamara Fraser	Voice, main role
2019–2021	The Rich and the Ruthless	Beth	Main Cast: Seasons 3-4
2020	Cleopatra in Space	Professor Klabrax V	Voice, 2 episodes
2020	Spirit Riding Free: Riding Academy	Fannie Granger	Voice, episode: "Race to the Finish"
2020	The Boys	Valerie	Episode: "Nothing Like It in the World"
2020–2024	Star Trek: Lower Decks	Carol Freeman	Voice, main role
2021	9-1-1	Danvers	Episode: "Survivors"
2021	HouseBroken	Additional Voices	
2021	Rick and Morty	-	Voice, episode: "Rick & Morty's Thanksploitation Spectacular"
2021	Duncanville	-	Voice, 2 episodes
2021–2022	Karma's World	Ms. Jackie Washington	Voice, recurring role
2021–2022	Star Trek Logs	Captain Carol Freeman	Voice, episode: "Carol Freeman Personal Audio Log 1-3"
2022	Grey's Anatomy	Jamarah Blake	Recurring cast (season 18)
2022	The Cuphead Show!	Bedelia / Boo-Boo	Voice, episode: "Dead Broke"
2022	Interrupting Chicken	Ms. Clara / Mail Lady	Voice, episode: "Where's the Party?/Chicken Out West"
2022–2023	Young Rock	Prime Minister Angela Honig	Recurring cast: Season 3
2023	Fired on Mars	Judith	Voice, episode: "The God of War"
2024	The Fairly OddParents: A New Wish	Tina Churner	Voice, 6 episodes
2026	Nemesis	Deniece "Neicy" Williams	Recurring cast: Season 1

=== Video games ===
Year	Title	Role	Notes
2003	Gladius	Additional Voices	
2004	World of Warcraft	Additional Voices	
2005	X-Men Legends II: Rise of Apocalypse	Storm	
2006	True Crime: New York City	Additional Voices	
2006	Marvel: Ultimate Alliance	Storm	
2007	Spider-Man 3	Additional Voices	
2008	The Rise of the Argonauts	Additional Voices	
2009	Marvel: Ultimate Alliance 2	Storm	
2017	Tacoma	Evelyn Victoria St. James	
2018	Fallout 76	Kesha McDermott, Mayor Barbara, Clara Davis	
2020	World of Warcraft: Shadowlands	Additional Voices	

== Album appearances ==
- Vanessa Williams – The Right Stuff, on the song "If You Really Love Him"
- Take 6 – So Much 2 Say, on the interlude "That's The Law"
- D-Nice – Call Me D-Nice, on the song "It's Over"
