= To tha Rescue =

Studio album by D-Nice
- Released: November 26, 1991
- Recorded: March–October, 1991
- Studio: Battery Studios (New York, U.S.)
- Genre: Hip hop
- Length: 41:04
- Label: Jive
- Producer: D-Nice; Skeff Anselm; Naughty By Nature; Carl Bourelly

D-Nice chronology
Call Me D-Nice (1990)	To tha Rescue (1991)

Professional ratings
Review scores
Source	Rating
Allmusic	3/5 stars

To tha Rescue is the second and final studio album by American rapper D-Nice. It was released on November 26, 1991, via Jive Records and was produced by D-Nice, Naughty by Nature, Skeff Anselm and Carl Bourley. The album features guest appearances by the likes of KRS-One, Too Short, E-Marvelous, and Naughty by Nature. Though not as successful as his previous effort Call Me D-Nice, this record managed to find some success making it to #137 on the Billboard 200 and #27 on the Top R&B/Hip-Hop Albums. It spawned three singles: "To tha Rescue", "25 ta Life" (peaked at #23 on the Hot Rap Songs) and "Time to Flow" (peaked at #15 on the Hot Rap Songs).

== Track listing ==
No.	Title	Producer(s)	Length
1.	"808 Prelude"	D-Nice	0:21
2.	"25 ta Life"	D-Nice	3:07
3.	"Rhymin' Skills" (featuring KRS-One)	D-Nice	3:09
4.	"Time to Flow" (featuring Naughty By Nature)	Naughty By Nature	4:11
5.	"Get in Touch With Me"	Carl Bourelly	3:38
6.	"To tha Rescue"	Skeff Anselm	3:39
7.	"No, No, No"	Skeff Anselm	3:47
8.	"Straight From tha Bronx"	D-Nice	3:52
9.	"Check Yourself" (featuring Too $hort)	D-Nice	3:57
10.	"Time to Flow"	Naughty By Nature	4:18
11.	"And There U Have It" (featuring E-Marvelous)	D-Nice	3:38
12.	"I Send This Out to..."	D-Nice	3:20
Total length:			41:04

Notes

- "Get in Touch With Me" featured uncredited vocals by Roz
- "And There U Have It" featured uncredited rap vocals by E-Marvelous

== Personnel ==
- Derrick Jones - performer, producer (tracks: 1–3, 8–9, 11–12), executive producer, mixing (tracks: 1–4, 8–12), keyboards, scratches, drum programming
- Lawrence Parker - performer (track 3)
- Roz Davies - performer (track 5)
- Todd Anthony Shaw - performer (track 9)
- Carl Bourelly - producer & mixing (track 5)
- Skeff Anselm - producer & mixing (tracks: 6–7)
- Tom Coyne - mastering
- David Bellochio - keyboards
- Jean-Paul Bourelly - guitar
- Vincent Henry - guitar & saxophone
- Anthony Rahsaan - executive producer
- Naughty by Nature - performer (track 4), producer (tracks: 4, 10)
- E-Marvelous - performer (track 11)

== Charts ==
Album

Year	Chart	Peak position
1991	US Billboard 200	137
1992	US Billboard Top R&B/Hip-Hop Albums	27

Singles

Year	Song	Peak position
Year	Song	Hot Rap Songs
1991	"25 ta Life"	15
1992	"Time to Flow"	23
