= The Fanatics (film) =

- Directed by: Marc Lasky
- Starring: Mark Curry; Edward Asner; Barry Corbin; Austin Pendleton
- Music by: Thomas Chase; Steve Rucker
- Release date: 1997
- Running time: 90 minutes
- Country: United States
- Language: English

The Fanatics (also known as Fumbleheads) is a 1997 comedy film starring Ed Asner, Mark Curry, Barry Corbin and Austin Pendleton.

== Plot ==
Quimby Falls, much like many American small towns, loves football with passion. When the Buzzard team owner moves the team to another town, a few die-hard fans formulate a drastic plan to bring the team back home again.

== See also ==
- List of American football films
