= Hangin' with Mr. Cooper =

American television sitcom (1992–1997)

- Genre: Sitcom
- Created by: Jeff Franklin
- Starring: Mark Curry; Dawnn Lewis; Holly Robinson Peete; Raven-Symoné; Saundra Quarterman; Nell Carter; Marquise Wilson; Omar Gooding
- Theme music composer: Foster and McElroy (season 1); Steve Tyrell (season 2); Gary Boren & Steven Chesne (seasons 3–5)
- Opening theme: "Hangin' with My Man", performed by Dawnn Lewis & Holly Robinson Peete with En Vogue (season 1); "Soul Man", performed by Howard Hewett (season 2); "Cooper, Cooper", performed by Sherwood Ball, Carmen Carter and Oren Waters (seasons 3–5)
- Composers: Jesse Frederick & Bennett Salvay (season 1); Steve Tyrell (season 2); Gary Boren; Steven Chesne (seasons 3–5; alternating)
- Country of origin: United States
- Original language: English
- No. of seasons: 5
- No. of episodes: 101 (list of episodes)

Production
- Executive producers: Jeff Franklin (season 1, eps. 1–3 & 10); Danny Kallis (season 1, eps. 3–22); Cheryl Gard (season 2); William Bickley & Michael Warren (seasons 3–5); Barry O'Brien & Cheryl Alu (season 4); David Chambers (season 5); Mark Curry (season 3-5)
- Camera setup: Videotape; Multi-camera
- Running time: 30 minutes
- Production companies: Jeff Franklin Productions; Bickley-Warren Productions (1994–1997) (seasons 3–5); Lorimar Television (1992–1993) (season 1); Warner Bros. Television (1993–1997) (seasons 2–5)

Original release
- Network: ABC
- Release: September 22, 1992 – August 30, 1997

Hangin' with Mr. Cooper is an American television sitcom that originally aired on ABC from September 22, 1992, to August 30, 1997, starring Mark Curry and Holly Robinson. The show took place in Curry's hometown of Oakland, California. The series chronicles Mark Cooper (Curry), a former NBA player-turned-substitute teacher/gym coach (and later basketball coach), and his roommate (later girlfriend, then fiancée) Vanessa Russell (Robinson).

Hangin' with Mr. Cooper was produced by Jeff Franklin Productions, in association with Warner Bros. Television, having been produced by Lorimar Television for the first season before being absorbed, and also became produced by Bickley-Warren Productions by the third season. The show originally aired on Tuesdays in prime time after sister series Full House, also created by Jeff Franklin and set in the San Francisco Bay Area. The show found its niche as an addition to the TGIF Friday night lineup on ABC, and was part of the lineup from September 1993 to May 1996 (spanning the show's second, third and fourth seasons before moving to Saturdays for its fifth and final season). During August 1997, at the end of the fifth season, additional new episodes were also aired on Fridays.

== Cast ==
=== Main ===
- Mark Curry as Mark Cooper
- Holly Robinson Peete as Vanessa Russell
- Dawnn Lewis as Robin Dumars (Season 1)
- Marquise Wilson as Tyler Foster (Seasons 2–5; recurring Season 1)
- Nell Carter as Pamela Jane "P.J." Moore (Seasons 2–3)
- Saundra Quarterman as Geneva Lee (Seasons 2–5)
- Raven-Symoné as Nicole Lee (Seasons 2–5)
- Omar Gooding as Earvin Rodman (Seasons 4–5; recurring Seasons 1–3)

=== Recurring ===
- Roger E. Mosley as Coach Ricketts (Season 1)
- Peter Brost as Young Coach Ricketts (Seasons 1–2)
- Christopher Carter as Andre Bailis (Seasons 1–2)
- Dominic Hoffman as Thaddeus White (Season 2)
- Don Cheadle as Bennie (Season 2)
- Ron Canada as Chet Corley (Season 3)
- Ajai Sanders as Denise (Season 3)
- Kristoff St. John as Eric Thompson (Season 3; guest star in Season 4)
- Steve White as Steve Warner (Season 3)
- Kevin Jackson as Ken Anderson (Seasons 3–4; guest star in Season 5)
- Lorraine Fields as Miss Simpson (Seasons 3–4)
- Kelly Perine as Mr. Morley (Season 4)
- Gloria Gifford as Miss Cosgrove (Season 4)
- Lewis Dix as Lydell (Seasons 4–5)

== Production ==
Main cast, from Season 3 (l–r): Quarterman, Symoné, Curry, Robinson Peete, Wilson

The pilot episode was filmed on the same house set used by the Seaver family on the sitcom Growing Pains.

== Episodes ==
Season	Episodes	Originally released		Rank	Rating
Season	Episodes	First released	Last released	Rank	Rating
1	22	September 22, 1992	May 18, 1993	16	14.6 (Tied with The Fresh Prince of Bel-Air and The Jackie Thomas Show)
2	22	September 24, 1993	May 20, 1994	38	11.92
3	22	September 23, 1994	May 12, 1995	41	11.2
4	22	September 15, 1995	May 10, 1996	61	9.3
5	13	June 21, 1997	August 30, 1997	94	3.2

=== Broadcast history ===
- September 1992 - July 1993, ABC Tuesday 8:30–9:00
- August 1993 - September 1993, ABC Friday 8:30–9:00
- September 1993 - August 1996, ABC Friday 9:30–10:00
- June 1997 - August 1997, ABC Saturday 8:30–9:00
- August 1997, ABC Friday 9:30–10:00 (in addition to the Saturday August episodes)

== Syndication ==
Hangin' with Mr. Cooper went into off-network broadcast syndication (via Telepictures Distribution and Warner Bros. Domestic Television Distribution) in the fall of 1996, where it lasted until the fall of 2000 (airing until the fall of 1999 in some markets). From July 2008 to January 2009 it aired on ION Television as part of the network's Laugh Attack hour of American sitcoms, initially running from 5-6PM/ET, then moved an hour later (switching time slots with The Steve Harvey Show).

The series has also aired on cable network TNN from 2000 to 2002, on Nickelodeon’s teen-oriented television programming block, TEENick from 2001 to 2003, and on TV One from 2006 to 2008. The sitcom was picked up by Nick at Nite on January 13, 2014, to September 28 of the same year during the 6:00AM–7:00AM morning line-up. That same year, it aired on the Nick Jr. channel as part of their former nightly block NickMom, when it aired from October 15, 2014, to April 11, 2015. It also aired on TruTV for a short period in 2022, alongside Step by Step, another TGIF series.

On September 29, 2017, Hulu acquired the streaming rights to Hangin' with Mr. Cooper along with fellow Warner Bros. TV properties Family Matters, Full House, Perfect Strangers and Step by Step in addition to Disney-ABC TV properties Boy Meets World, Dinosaurs and Home Improvement.

On November 1, 2021, Hangin' with Mr. Cooper began streaming on HBO Max after its streaming rights expired from Hulu.

On May 4, 2026, the series made its debut on Cozi TV, airing weekday mornings at 10:00AM ET.

== Home media ==
On August 2, 2016, Warner Bros. released Hangin' with Mr. Cooper: The Complete First Season on DVD via their Warner Archive Collection burn-on-demand service. The second season was released on March 5, 2019, via WBShop.com.

DVD name	Ep #	Release date
The Complete First Season	22	August 2, 2016
The Complete Second Season	22	March 5, 2019
The Complete Third Season	22	January 21, 2020
