= Mark Curry (American actor) =

American actor, comedian, and host

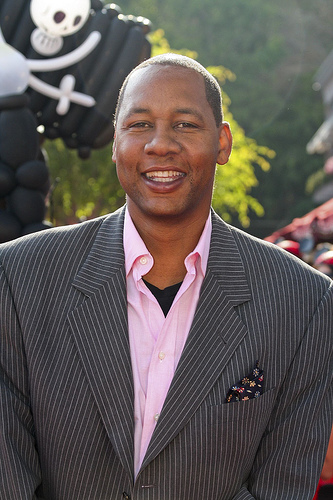
- Curry in 2008
- Born: Marcus G. Curry; June 1, 1961 (age 65); Oakland, California, U.S.
- Occupations: Actor; comedian; host
- Years active: 1988–present
- Known for: Mark Cooper – Hangin' with Mr. Cooper

Marcus G. Curry (born June 1, 1961), known professionally as Mark Curry, is an American actor, comedian, and television host. He is best known for his role as Mark Cooper, ex-basketball player turned teacher on the ABC sitcom Hangin' with Mr. Cooper which originally aired from 1992 to 1997.

Curry served as one of the hosts of the syndicated series It's Showtime at the Apollo during the early 1990s. Curry co-starred in all three seasons of See Dad Run, Nick at Nite's first original live-action family comedy series, from 2012 to 2015.

== Early life and education ==
Born in Oakland, California, Curry is the youngest of nine. Curry attended St. Joseph Notre Dame High School in neighboring Alameda, and California State University, East Bay in nearby Hayward. As a child, Curry was a participant at the East Oakland Youth Development Center (EOYDC), a local youth organization.

== Career ==
Curry's first role was in the 1991 feature film Talkin' Dirty After Dark where he appeared alongside Martin Lawrence.

Curry's first major role was on the ABC sitcom Hangin' with Mr. Cooper which made its debut in September 1992. On the show he played the lead role of Mark Cooper, an National Basketball Association (NBA) player-turned-substitute teacher/gym coach. Hangin' with Mr. Cooper was eventually on air for five seasons with over a hundred episodes.

In 1994, Curry guest starred on the sitcom Living Single. In 1997, he made another guest appearance on the sitcom Martin. Curry was later featured on two episodes of The Jamie Foxx Show as eccentric driving instructor Sergeant Easy.

Curry also made cameos in the 1997 feature film Switchback and 1998 feature film Armageddon.

In 2000, Curry had a recurring role on The Drew Carey Show as Robert Soulard, Drew Carey's boss. That year he also hosted the Comedy Central game show Don't Forget Your Toothbrush and made a guest appearance on the sitcom For Your Love with his Hangin' with Mr. Cooper co-star, Holly Robinson Peete.

Curry went on to play the lead role of scientist Norton Ballard in the Disney Channel Original Movie The Poof Point. The movie reunited Curry with Hangin' with Mr. Cooper co-star Dawnn Lewis, who played his onscreen wife Marigold.

Curry was the host of the PAX-TV show Animal Tails and BET's Coming to the Stage in 2003. In 2004, he appeared on Celebrity Mole Yucatan. He came in second place to Dennis Rodman.

In 2005, Curry was featured on an episode of Less than Perfect and guest starred as Max Cooper on two episodes of Fat Actress. Curry made another guest appearance on a 2008 episode of the sitcom House of Payne. On November 30, 2008, Curry performed a stand-up comedy routine on The Comedy Festival Laffapalooza Special which was hosted by Tracy Morgan.

From 2009 to 2011, Curry hosted Jamie Foxx's FoxxHole Live every Monday in the Conga Room in Los Angeles, which was heard on satellite radio stations Sirius 106/XM 149. In 2012, Curry joined Sommore, Earthquake, Bruce Bruce, and Tony Rock on the Royal Comedy Tour.

He later appeared on two episodes of The Secret Life of the American Teenager. Curry also starred in Nick at Nite's first-ever original live-action family sitcom, See Dad Run, which debuted in 2012, as Marcus, who's a friend of Scott Baio's character. See Dad Run eventually ran for three seasons on the network.

In 2014, Curry joined Sommore's Standing Ovation Comedy Tour along with Bill Bellamy, Tommy Davidson, and others. That same year, Bounce TV launched the sitcom One Love, starring Curry and Sheryl Lee Ralph. In 2018, Curry was a special guest on the Katt Williams 11:11 Tour. Since 2018, Curry has also regularly performed stand-up comedy at the Hollywood Improv.

== Music ==
Curry was featured in the music video for Too Short's "I Ain't Trippin'". He also appeared in the music video of Bow Wow's "Take Ya Home", where he played a father trying to get his daughter a doll of the rapper.

He appeared in the 2002 song "Oakland Raiders" by Oakland rap group Luniz. Delivering a humorous monologue as the song faded out, Curry asserted his status as a pimp and stated his fondness for big dank. He can be seen in the 2015 music video "Pulled Up" by Young Dolph featuring 2 Chainz and Juicy J; a tribute to the film Coming to America.

== Personal life ==
In May 2007, an Aerosol spray dispenser that had fallen behind a water heater exploded, and Curry, who was doing laundry at the time, was burned on more than 20% of his body, including his arm, back, and side. He spent many months recuperating at his home.

According to an Associated Press interview posted on CNN.com in February 2008, Curry went on The Montel Williams Show to discuss his recovery, and mentioned he considered suicide after waking from a three-day, medically induced coma, but decided against it with the help of friends and fellow comedians, such as Sinbad and Bill Cosby.

== 2015 private settlement ==
In August 2026, Mark Curry's name surfaced in media coverage surrounding a major civil lawsuit filed by his former The Poof Point co-star, Raquel Lee. Lee filed a negligence lawsuit against The Walt Disney Company alleging that she was repeatedly sexually assaulted and raped by an unnamed, middle-aged production employee during the film's 2001 production when she was 14 years old. The complaint details that the employee supplied her with alcohol, assaulted her in a hotel room in Salt Lake City where the cast and crew were staying, and assaulted her again on a flight back to California, while production allegedly separated her from her guardian and failed to intervene despite visible signs of intoxication and distress.

While Lee's civil suit focuses on Disney's corporate liability and failure to protect her, media reports highlighted that Lee had previously reached a private, confidential out-of-court settlement with Curry in 2015. Represented at the time by attorney Gloria Allred, Lee entered into the confidential agreement with Curry—who played her father in the Disney Channel movie and was 40 years old during the film's production—concerning separate matters related to the project. Specific details of the 2015 settlement remain private, and neither Lee nor Curry commented on the arrangement following the resurfacing of the case.

== Filmography ==
=== Film ===
Year	Title	Role	Notes
1991	Talkin' Dirty After Dark	Antonio	
1995	Panther	Lombard	
1997	The Fanatics	Fly Walker	
1997	Switchback	Robbie	
1998	Armageddon	Stu the Cabbie	
2000	A Man Is Mostly Water	Jeff	
2001	Motorcrossed	Bob Arness	TV Movie
2001	The Poof Point	Norton Ballard	TV Movie
2009	Psychic Hollywood: The Search for Truth	Himself	TV Movie
2011	Poolboy: Drowning Out the Fury	Captain O'Malley	
2021	Dreams from the Edge	Bubba	Short

=== Television ===
Year	Title	Role	Notes
1988–91	It's Showtime at the Apollo	Himself	Recurring guest
1990	An Evening at the Improv	Himself	Episode: "Episode #5.14" & "#6.14"
1991	One Night Stand	Himself	Episode: "Mark Curry"
1991	Paramount City	Himself	Episode: "Episode #2.7"
1992–94	It's Showtime at the Apollo	Himself/Host	Recurring Host: season 5-7
1992–97	Hangin' with Mr. Cooper	Mark Cooper	Main cast
1994	Living Single	Tony Ross	Episode: "A Tale of Two Tattles"
1995	Soul Train	Himself/Guest Host	Episode: "CeCe Winans/Ini Kamoze/Mokenstef"
1995	Happily Ever After: Fairy Tales for Every Child	The Giant (voice)	Episode: "The Valiant Little Tailor"
1997	Mad TV	Himself/Host	Episode: "Episode #2.18"
1997	Martin	Ronnie Cochran	Episode: "Power to the People's Court"
1997–98	The Jamie Foxx Show	Sergeant Easy	Episode: "Traffic School Daze" & "I'm Too Sexy for This Shot"
1998	Hollywood Squares	Himself/Panelist	Recurring Panelist
1999	Comedy Central Presents	Himself	Episode: "Mark Curry"
2000	Intimate Portrait	Himself	Episode: "Holly Robinson Peete"
2000	Don't Forget Your Toothbrush	Himself/Host	Main host
2000	The Drew Carey Show	Robert Soulard	Recurring cast: Season 5
2000	For Your Love	Dr. Collins	Episode: "The Pregnant Pause"
2002–03	Pyramid	Himself/Celebrity Contestant	Recurring guest
2003	Coming to the Stage	Himself/Host	Main host
2003–04	Animal Tails	Himself/Host	Main host
2004	Hollywood Squares	Himself/Panelist	Recurring panelist
2004	The Mole	Himself	Main cast: Season 4
2005	Less than Perfect	Morpheus	Episode: "Get Away"
2005	Fat Actress	Max Cooper	Episode: "Big Butts" & "Hold This"
2006	In the Mix	Himself	Episode: "The 'Grammy' Goes to Camp: You're a Star & Kids Are Helping Kids"
2006	Def Comedy Jam	Himself	Episode: "Episode #7.9"
2007	Back to the Grind	Himself	Episode: "Betty White and Mark Curry"
2008	Tyler Perry's House of Payne	-	Episode: "Reunited and... It Don't Feel Good"
2009	Black to the Future	Himself	Episode: "Hour 4: The 00s"
2010	Life After	Himself	Episode: "Mark Curry"
2011	Celebrity Ghost Stories	Himself	Episode: "Beverley Mitchell/Mark Curry/Donovan Leitch/Phyllis Diller"
2011–12	The Secret Life of the American Teenager	Principal Nash	Episode: "And Circumstance" & "Defiance"
2012–14	See Dad Run	Marcus Barnes	Main cast
2014	Unsung	Himself	Episode: "Too $hort"
2014	Gotham Comedy Live	Himself/Host	Episode: "Mark Curry"
2014	One Love	Pastor William Winters	Main cast
2015	Instant Mom	Minister	Episode: "Don't Worry, Be Maggie"
2015	Black Jesus	Big Tray	Episode: "Janky Cable"
2019–21	Family Reunion	Principal Glass	Guest: Season 1, Recurring Cast: Season 3
2020	In the Cut	Wade	Recurring cast: Season 6–7
2023	Blindspotting	Himself	Episode: "Planes, Trains, and Automobiles"
