= Animal Tails =

- Genre: Educational, Reality
- Presented by: Mark Curry
- Country of origin: United States
- Original language: English

Production
- Production companies: Litton Studios; MTO Productions

Original release
- Network: PAX
- Release: October 5, 2003

Animal Tails is an American television variety show for teenage animal lovers. Hosted by comedian Mark Curry, the series highlights different features of the animal kingdom, from pets to more exotic animals. Reruns of this series currently air Saturday mornings on Bounce TV.
