= D-Nice =

American DJ, record producer, and rapper (born 1970)

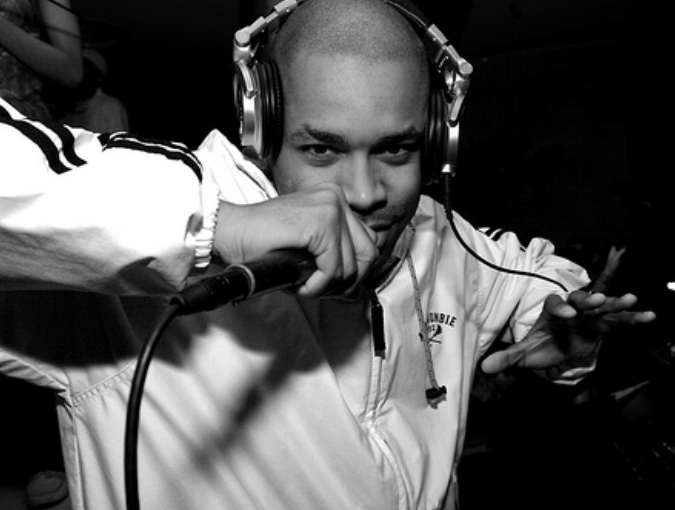
- D-Nice in 2005

Background information
- Born: Derrick T. Jones; June 19, 1970 (age 56); Manhattan, New York City, New York, US
- Origin: The Bronx, New York City, New York, US
- Genres: Hip hop
- Occupations: Disc jockey; record producer; rapper; beatboxer; photographer
- Years active: 1986–present
- Labels: Roc Nation; Jive; Violator
- Formerly of: Boogie Down Productions
- Website: d-nice.com

D-Nice is the stage name of Derrick T. Jones (born June 19, 1970), an American DJ, record producer, and rapper who began his career in the mid-1980s with the hip hop group Boogie Down Productions. He discovered KRS-One in 1988, landing him a deal with Jive Records.

== Early life, family and education ==
Jones was born and raised in the Harlem neighborhood of Manhattan, New York City. He later moved to the Highbridge section of The Bronx as a teenager.

== Career ==
At age 15, in the Bronx he met Scott La Rock and later formed Boogie Down Productions along with KRS-One in 1986. In his early career with the group, he was given the nicknames as "the Human TR-808" and "the 808". D-Nice also gained significant popularity when he produced the song "Self-Destruction" for the Stop the Violence Movement. Soon after the song released, D-Nice signed a solo deal with Jive Records and released his debut studio album Call Me D-Nice in 1990. The album peaked at No. 75 on the Billboard Top Pop Albums and No. 12 on the Top Black Albums chart. It was also rated 3.5 out of 5 mics by The Source magazine. In 1991, D-Nice released his second studio album called To tha Rescue. The album peaked at No. 137 on the Top Pop Albums chart and No. 27 on the Top R&B Albums chart. He collaborated with KRS-One, Naughty by Nature, and Too Short for the album.

D-Nice clashed with Jive Records over his stylistic direction and soon stopped releasing music as a recording artist.

He was a web developer in the late 1990s and started his own creative services company in 2000. He began working as a photographer in the 2000s while also still being a DJ and shot the album covers for Carl Thomas' 2007 album So Much Better and Pharoahe Monch's 2011 album W.A.R. (We Are Renegades). He also photographed the album cover for Kenny Lattimore's 2017 album, Vulnerable.

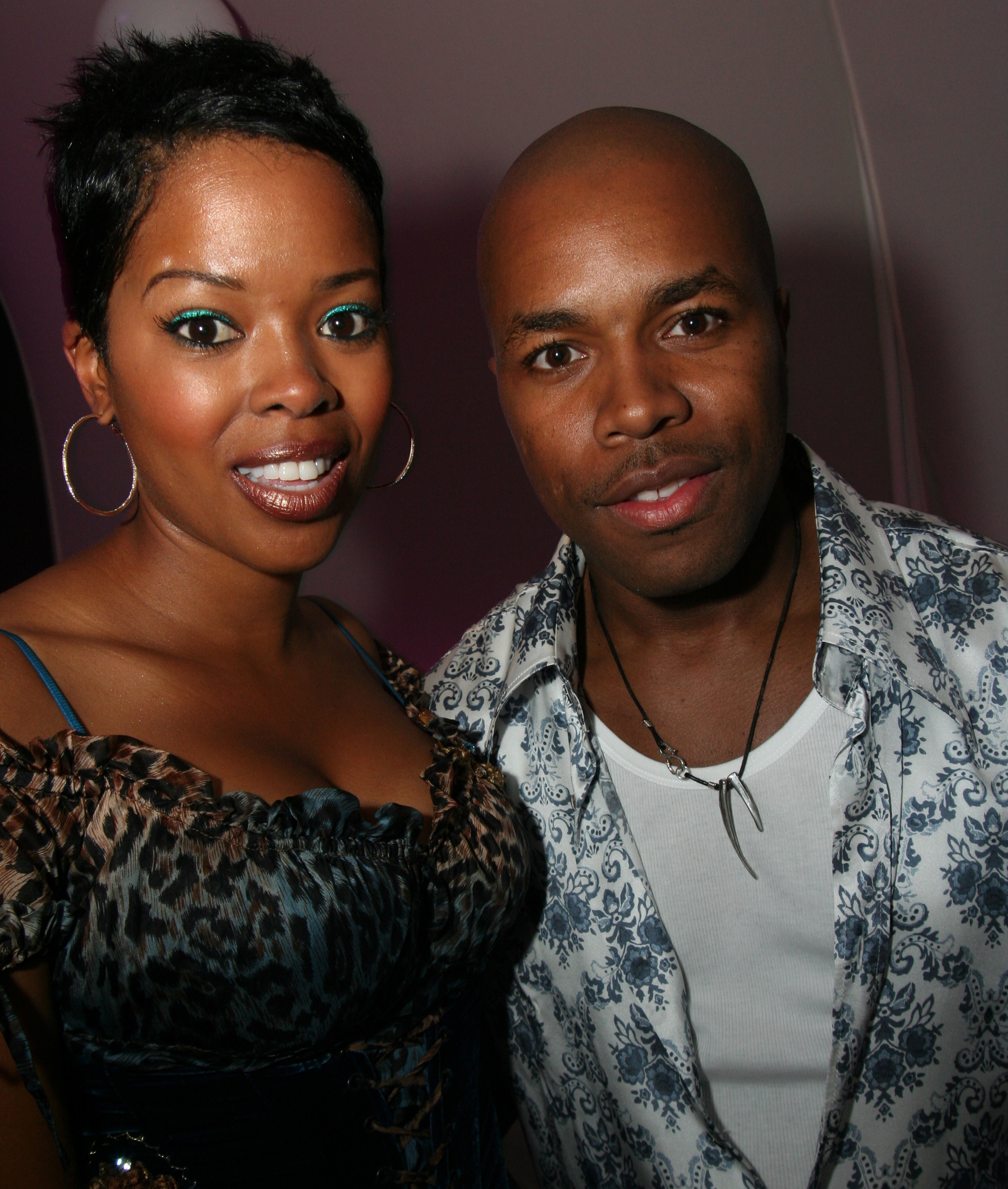
D-Nice with Malinda Williams

In 2012, D-Nice DJ'd President Barack Obama's second inaugural ball.

In March 2020, D-Nice began hosting Homeschool at Club Quarantine on Instagram Live from his home as a way for people to come together and help others cope with the COVID-19 global health crisis. The 3/21 Saturday night dance party ran 9 hours and D-Nice urged people to "take care of one another and wash their hands." It drew over 100,000 viewers, including Rihanna, Lenny Kravitz, Nile Rodgers, Lalah Hathaway, Bernie Sanders, Joe Biden, Dwyane Wade, Janet Jackson, Fab Five Freddy, Michelle Obama, Mark Zuckerberg, Donnie Wahlberg, Angela Bassett, and Sheila E., among others. The following day, March 22, his stream capped at over 160,000 simultaneous viewers. D-Nice won the 2020 Webby Award for Artist of the Year in the category Special Achievement. He also was one of the Honoree Recipients for the Shine a Light Award during the 2020 BET Awards for his contributions of Club Quarantine, alongside co-recipients with Verzuz creators Timbaland and Swizz Beatz.

On March 27, 2021, he was awarded Entertainer of the Year at the 52nd NAACP Image Awards. On June 22, 2021, he was awarded the ASCAP Voice of the Culture Award for being a beacon of hope and source of inspiration during the COVID-19 pandemic. His livestreamed DJ sets remain a popular online destination for thousands weekly, and he has more than 2.6 million followers on Instagram, and he has additionally sold out in-person DJ sets at the Kennedy Center and Carnegie Hall. In June 2024, D-Nice received a "cultural icon" award from the Bronx Community Foundation at the organization's inaugural gala, alongside poet and actor Caridad de la Luz and former deputy mayor of New York City Sheena Wright. As of March 2025, a documentary about D-Nice is being developed.

== Personal life ==
In 1996, his first daughter, Ashli Lyric Jones, was born. He later had another daughter named Dylan Coleman-Jones with Kelli M. Coleman, Executive Vice President for GlobalHue.

In August 2008, he married actress Malinda Williams, but the couple separated in October 2009. In February 2010, the couple filed for divorce and the divorce was finalized on June 14, 2010.

== Discography ==
Album information
Call Me D-Nice
- Released: July 24, 1990
- Chart Positions: No. 75 US, No. 12 Top R&B/Hip-Hop
- Last RIAA certification: N/A
- Singles: "Call Me D-Nice", "Crumbs on the Table", "Glory"
To tha Rescue
- Released: November 26, 1991
- Chart Positions: No. 137 US, No. 27 Top R&B/Hip-Hop
- Last RIAA certification: N/A
- Singles: "25 Ta Life", "Time to Flow", "To tha Rescue"
