= Holly Robinson Peete =

American actress (born 1964)

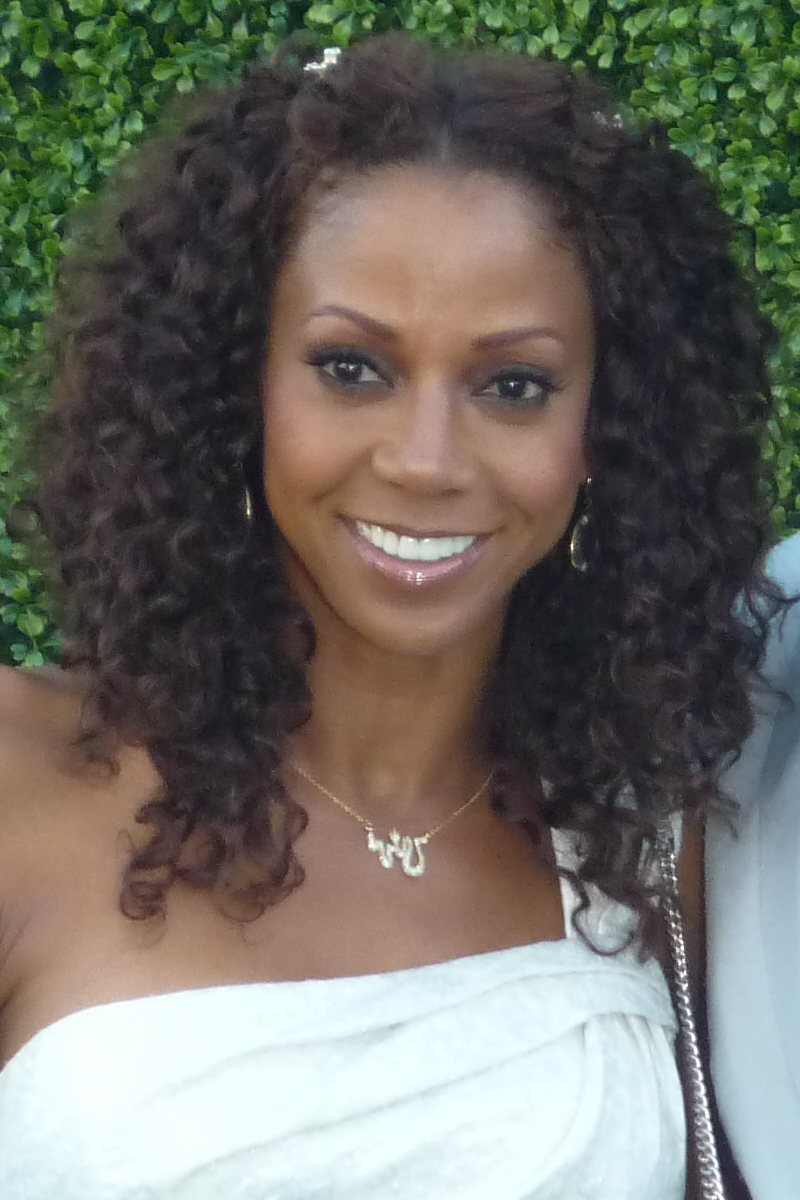
- Peete in 2010
- Born: Holly Elizabeth Robinson; September 18, 1964 (age 62); Philadelphia, Pennsylvania, U.S.
- Education: Sarah Lawrence College
- Occupations: Actress, author, singer, television personality
- Years active: 1969–present
- Known for: 21 Jump Street; Hangin' with Mr. Cooper; For Your Love
- Spouse: Rodney Peete (m. 1995)
- Children: 4
- Father: Matt Robinson

Holly Elizabeth Robinson Peete (born September 18, 1964) is an American actress and singer. She is known for her roles as Judy Hoffs on the Fox police drama 21 Jump Street, Vanessa Russell on the ABC sitcom Hangin' with Mr. Cooper, and Dr. Malena Ellis on the NBC/The WB sitcom For Your Love. She also served as one of the original co-hosts of the CBS Daytime talk show The Talk. She is also known for her portrayal of Diana Ross in the 1992 miniseries The Jacksons: An American Dream, which also aired on ABC.

A children's book by Peete, My Brother Charlie, won her an NAACP Image Award for Outstanding Literary Work in March 2011.

== Early life, family and education ==
Holly Elizabeth Robinson was born in Philadelphia, Pennsylvania, the daughter of Dolores and Matt Robinson. Dolores was a schoolteacher, in public relations, and later a personal talent manager. Matt was an actor, producer and writer, probably next known as the first actor to play Gordon on the children's television series Sesame Street. Holly has an older brother, Matthew Thomas Robinson III. She attended Greene Street Friends School in Germantown. In 1974, her family relocated to California.

Peete graduated from Santa Monica High School in Santa Monica, California, where her classmates included Rob Lowe and Yvette Lee Bowser. Peete graduated from Sarah Lawrence College in 1986 with a degree in psychology and French. Peete studied in Paris for a year at the Sorbonne; she is fluent in French. While in Paris, she sang in nightclubs, including a performance with jazz musician Lionel Hampton at the Hotel Meridian Jazz Club.

== Career ==
She made her first television appearance on Sesame Street. She recalls that when she was six years old, she kept blowing her line, saying "Hi, Daddy", instead of "Hi, Gordon", his character's name. She ended up with just an appearance where she walked down the street with Big Bird. At the age of 11, Holly worked for the children's show Kidsworld as a celebrity correspondent; she interviewed many actors and actresses for the program. As an actress, she has appeared on the TV series 21 Jump Street (1987–1991), Hangin' with Mr. Cooper (1992–1997), For Your Love (1998–2002), and Like Family (2003–2004). She was featured in the video for the 1990 hit single "Whip Appeal" by Babyface as the sultry radio host at the beginning of the video. While on Hangin' with Mr. Cooper, in 1992, she portrayed Diana Ross in The Jacksons: An American Dream. Robinson most recently starred on the UPN comedy Love, Inc.. The show lasted just one season, and was canceled after the WB/UPN merger.

Robinson has also had a limited career as a singer and recording artist, including the introductory song to 21 Jump Street. She contributed a variety of songs to the soundtrack of the film Howard the Duck. (She appeared as a musician/singer in a minor role in the film.) She recorded the theme song "We Got Our Love" for the 1987 film Three for the Road. She and Dawnn Lewis, along with R&B quartet En Vogue, performed the theme song for the first season of Hangin' with Mr. Cooper.

In 2006, she won, along with fellow writer Daniel Paisner, the Quills Award in Sports for the book Get Your Own Damn Beer, I'm Watching the Game!: A Woman's Guide to Loving Pro Football.

In 2010, she participated in The Celebrity Apprentice 3, playing for her own charity, the HollyRod Foundation, which provides support for families with Parkinson's disease or autism.

Robinson began co-hosting The Talk, a CBS daytime talk show, on October 18, 2010. In this forum, Robinson was known for expressing herself through her ethnicity and being especially vocal about African American issues and, since her son Rodney is affected by it, autism. In April 2011, Robinson hosted a weekly series on The Talk promoting autism awareness.

After serving on The Talk for its first season, Peete along with Leah Remini were released from the show. Failure to ever disclose why the two were let go brought on a great deal of audience criticism of the show, as well as protests from the stars' fans. Sharon Osbourne, Peete's former co-host on The Talk, reasoned why the two former hosts were released from the program in a guest appearance on The Howard Stern Show, criticizing both Peete and Remini. In early 2021, Osbourne was later embroiled in a scandal for her remarks made on The Talk to Sheryl Underwood, leading to Osbourne's termination from the program. During Osbourne's scandal and termination, both Peete and Remini took to social media to reproach Osbourne over her behaviors, additionally pointing out that they were on the receiving end of similar behaviors by Osbourne. Osbourne responded with threats of defamation lawsuits against both women, but ultimately did nothing.

Peete hosted the 42nd NAACP Image Awards, alongside Wayne Brady, on March 4, 2011.

The Peete family starred in a reality TV series on OWN, entitled For Peete's Sake from 2016 to 2017. The series followed the lives of Peete and her husband Rodney as they juggle career choices with their family life. This was followed by a similar Hallmark Channel reality series Meet the Peetes, which also ran for two seasons from 2018 to 2019.

Peete received a star on the Hollywood Walk of Fame for television on June 21, 2022.

In 2023, Peete competed in season nine of The Masked Singer as "Fairy". After besting Malin Akerman as "Squirrel" and Lele Pons as "Jackalope" on "Sesame Street Night", she was eliminated on "Country Night" alongside Alexa Bliss as "Axolotl". Peete also made some references to her father's work on Sesame Street.

== Personal life ==
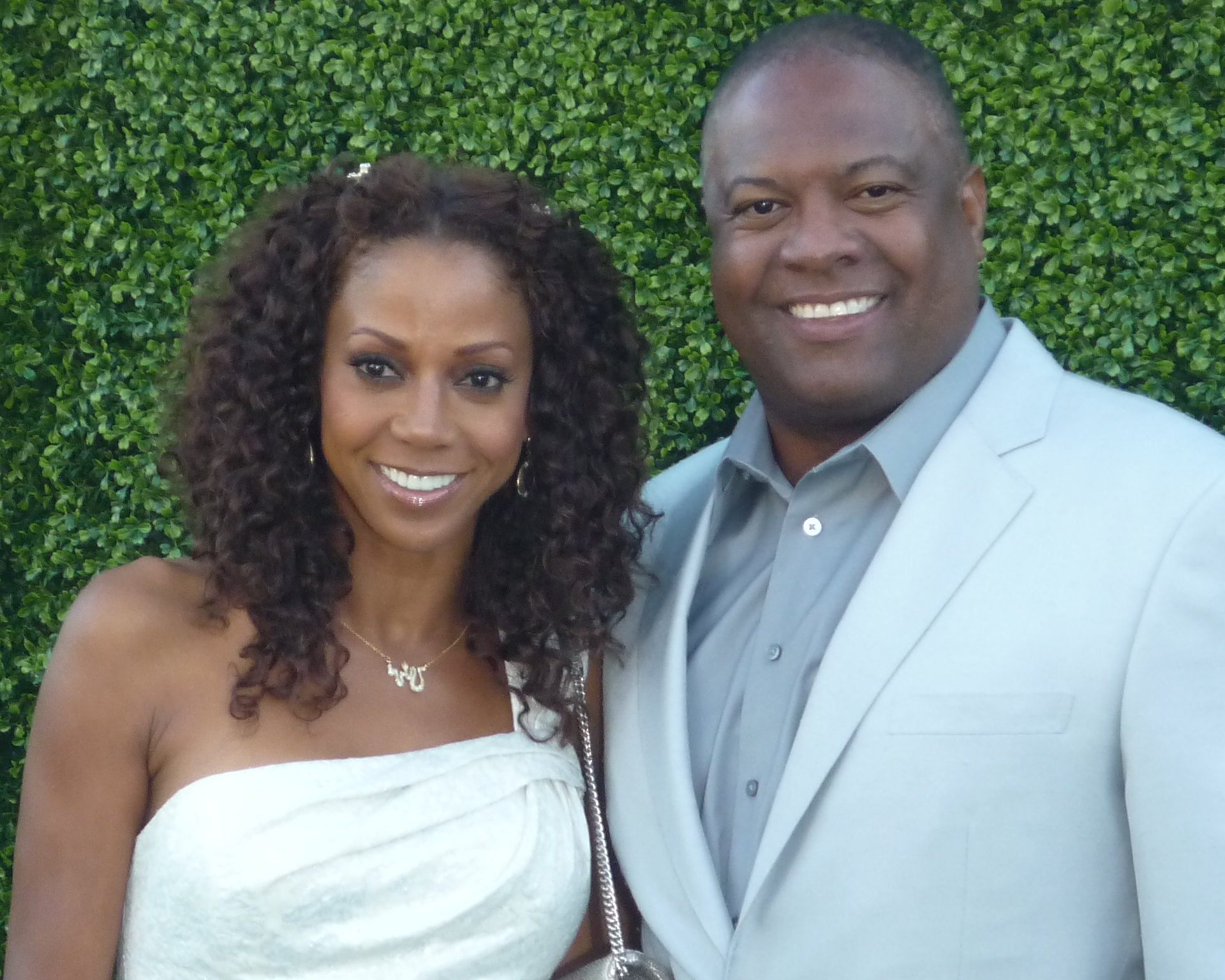
Peete with her husband Rodney Peete in 2010

On June 10, 1995, Robinson married Rodney Peete, a National Football League quarterback. He proposed by surprising Holly during an episode of Hangin' with Mr. Cooper on October 7, 1994. They have four children: twin boy and girl born in 1997, and sons born in 2002 and 2005.

One of their twins was diagnosed on the Autism spectrum at age three in 2000.

After her father was diagnosed with Parkinson's disease, Robinson and her husband co-founded the HollyRod Foundation, which is dedicated to help find a cure for the disease, as well as for autism, and assist those living with the conditions.

In September 2012, Nestle's Carnation Breakfast Essentials announced they had teamed up with Robinson, featuring her as the spokesperson for the brand. On October 4, 2012, Robinson was inducted as an honorary member of the Alpha Kappa Alpha sorority.

== Filmography ==
=== Film ===
Year	Title	Role	Notes
1979	Dummy	Genettia Lang	TV movie
1986	Howard the Duck	K.C./Cherry Bomb	
1998	Killers in the House	Jennie Sawyer	TV movie
1999	After All	Michelle Troussaint	TV movie
2004	Earthquake	Heaven	TV movie
2007	Matters of Life and Dating	Nicole Banning	TV movie
2007	Football Wives	Jackie Jameson	TV movie
2010	Speed-Dating	Gayle	
2012	21 Jump Street	Officer Judy Hoffs	
2015	Angel of Christmas	Yvette Collins	TV movie
2017	Michael Jackson: Searching for Neverland	Raymone Bain	TV movie
2017	Christmas in Evergreen	Michelle Lansing	TV movie
2018	Christmas in Evergreen: Letters to Santa	Michelle Lansing	TV movie
2019	Christmas in Evergreen: Tidings of Joy	Michelle Lansing	TV movie
2019	A Family Christmas Gift	Amanda	TV movie
2020	The Christmas Doctor	Dr. Zoey	TV movie
2020	Christmas in Evergreen: Bells Are Ringing	Michelle Lansing	TV movie
2021	Our Christmas Journey	Lena	TV movie
2022	The Journey Ahead	Madeline	TV movie
2022	Holiday Heritage	Micah	TV movie

=== Television ===
Year	Title	Role	Notes
1969	Sesame Street	Herself	Episode 47
1987–1991	21 Jump Street	Officer Judy Hoffs	Main role
1989–1990	Booker	Officer Judy Hoffs	Episode: "The Pump"
1991	Gabriel's Fire	Jackie Tate	Episode: "Belly of the Beast"
1992	The Jacksons: An American Dream	Diana Ross	Episode: "Part I & II"
1992–1997	Hangin' with Mr. Cooper	Vanessa Russell	Main role
1993	It's Showtime at the Apollo	Herself	Episode: "Episode #6.14"
1994	Soul Train	Herself/Guest Host	Episode: "Prince/Nona Gaye/For Lovers Only"
1994	An Evening at the Improv	Herself/Host	Episode: "Episode #15.25"
1997	Pacific Blue	Gina Galindo	Episode: "Soft Targets"
1997	Touched by an Angel	Vanessa Hamilton	Episode: "Smokescreen"
1998–2002	Hollywood Squares	Herself/Panelist	
1998–2002	For Your Love	Malena Ellis	Main role
1999	Jeopardy!	Herself/Celebrity Contestant	Episode: "1999-A Celebrity Jeopardy! Game 2"
1999–2001	Intimate Portrait	Herself	
2001	Strong Medicine	Halle Ellis	Episode: "Donors"
2001–2002	One on One	Stacey	Recurring role
2002	Fillmore!	Joelle Fillmore (voice)	Episode: "Cry, the Beloved Mascot"
2003	Ripley's Believe It or Not!	Herself	Episode: "Episode #4.17"
2003–2004	Like Family	Tanya Jones	Main role
2005–2006	Love, Inc.	Clea	Main role
2008	Who Are You Wearing	Herself	Episode: "Holly Robinson Peete"
2010	The Celebrity Apprentice	Herself	Main role: Season 9
2010	Are You Smarter Than a 5th Grader?	Herself	Episode: Episode 48
2010–2011	The Talk	Herself/Co-Host	Main role
2011–2014	Mike & Molly	Christina	Recurring role
2012	RuPaul's Drag U	Herself/Guest Professor	Episode: "Dangerous Curves"
2012	Say Yes to the Dress	Herself	Episode: "NFL Brides"
2013	Blue	Holly	Episode: "In the Running"
2014	Instant Mom	Mrs. Kimberley Phillips	Episode: "Distant Mom"
2014–2016	Celebrity Name Game	Herself/Celebrity Player	
2015	David Tutera's Celebrations	Herself	Episode: "Family Fundraiser for Autism"
2015	Wife Swap	Herself	Episode: "Margaret Cho/Holly Robinson-Peete"
2015	Celebrity Family Feud	Herself	Episode: "Rob Gronkowski vs. Holly Robinson Peete/Bill Engvall vs. Keke Palmer"
2015	Real Husbands of Hollywood	Herself	Episode: "Broad Talk"
2016	Kocktails with Khloé	Herself	Episode: "Khloé Kardashian Spills the O.J."
2016	Chicago Fire	Tamara Jones	Recurring role
2016–2017	For Peete's Sake	Herself	Main role
2018–2019	Meet the Peetes	Herself	Main role
2018–2021	Morning Show Mysteries	Belinda "Billie" Blessings	Main role
2019	Hollywood Medium	Herself	Episode: "Lala Kent", "Jesse Tyler Ferguson" & "Holly Robinson Peete"
2019	Uncensored	Herself	Episode: "Tisha Campbell"
2020	Law & Order: Special Victims Unit	Detective Rachel Wilson	Episode: "The Longest Night of Rain"
2021	American Housewife	Tami Gaines	Recurring role
2022	People Puzzler	Herself	Episode: "Now Ya Tell Me"
2022	A Black Lady Sketch Show	Herself	Episode: "Save My Edges, I'm a Donor!"
2023	Name That Tune	Herself/Contestant	Episode: "Bring the Funny"
2023	Queens Court	Herself/Host	
2023	The Masked Singer	Herself/Fairy	Season 9 contestant
2023	The Proud Family: Louder and Prouder	Dr. Kathleen Lord (voice)	Episode: "BeBe"
2024	Lego Masters: Celebrity Holiday Bricktacular	Herself	Season 3 contestant
2025–present	Weather Hunters	Dot Hunter	Main role
2025	The Neighborhood	Katrina	Episode: "Welcome to Secrets and Santa"
2026	Boston Blue	Jill Peters	"Beautiful Broken Things"

=== Music videos ===
Year	Title	Artist	Role
1990	Whip Appeal	Babyface	Radio Announcer
2003	Dance with My Father	Luther Vandross	Herself

Note: She was credited as Holly Robinson until 1997.

Media offices
First	The Talk co-host 2010–2011	Succeeded by Aisha Tyler
