= Rodney Peete =

American football player (born 1966)

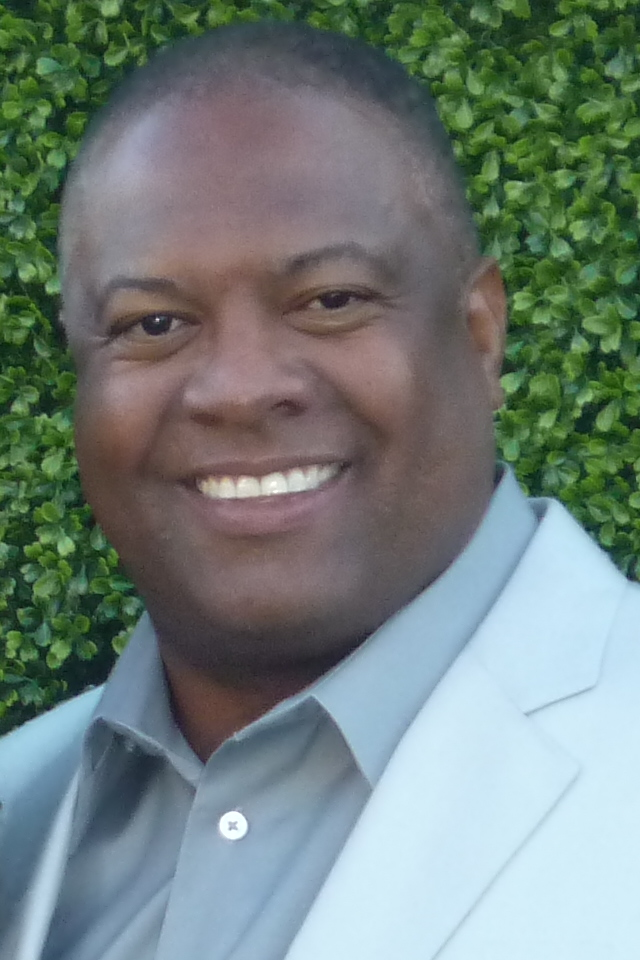
- Peete in 2010

No. 9, 16
- Position: Quarterback

Personal information
- Born: March 16, 1966 (age 60); Mesa, Arizona, U.S.
- Listed height: 6 ft 0 in (1.83 m)
- Listed weight: 230 lb (104 kg)

Career information
- High school: Shawnee Mission South (Overland Park, Kansas)
- College: USC (1985–1988)
- NFL draft: 1989: 6th round, 141st overall pick

Career history
- Detroit Lions (1989–1993); Dallas Cowboys (1994); Philadelphia Eagles (1995–1998); Washington Redskins (1999); Oakland Raiders (2000–2001); Carolina Panthers (2002–2004)

Awards and highlights
- Johnny Unitas Golden Arm Award (1988); Pop Warner Trophy (1988); First-team All-American (1988); Pac-10 Offensive Player of the Year (1988); First-team All-Pac-10 (1988); Second-team All-Pac-10 (1987); NCAA Silver Anniversary Award (2014)

Career NFL statistics
- Passing attempts: 2,346
- Passing completions: 1,344
- Completion percentage: 57.3%
- TD–INT: 76–92
- Passing yards: 16,338
- Passer rating: 73.3
- Stats at Pro Football Reference

Rodney Peete Sr. (born March 16, 1966) is an American former professional football player who was a quarterback in the National Football League (NFL). He played college football for the USC Trojans, earning first-team All-American honors in 1988. Peete was selected in the sixth round of the 1989 NFL draft. He played in the NFL for the Detroit Lions, Dallas Cowboys, Philadelphia Eagles, Washington Redskins, Oakland Raiders, and Carolina Panthers.

== Early life ==
Peete was born in Mesa, Arizona. He attended Sahuaro High School in Tucson. Peete was a three-year letterman in football, basketball, and baseball. In football, he was named the Arizona High School Player of the Year and an Academic All-American as a junior. He also contributed to his teams winning state championships in basketball and baseball.

Peete transferred to Shawnee Mission South High School in Overland Park, Kansas for his senior year, after his father Willie was hired as an assistant coach by the Kansas City Chiefs. He received Prep All-American honors at quarterback at the end of the season. Peete also was drafted in the 30th round (722nd overall) by the Toronto Blue Jays in the 1984 Major League Baseball draft, but opted to attend college instead.

In 2012, Peete was inducted into the Arizona Sports Hall of Fame.

== College career ==
Peete accepted a football scholarship from the University of Southern California, because head coach Ted Tollner had given him an opportunity to play quarterback. As a redshirt freshman, he began the season as a backup quarterback behind Sean Salisbury. In the fifth game against Stanford University, Peete replaced Salisbury in the fourth quarter and led USC to its only touchdown in the second half, sealing a 30–6 win. Salisbury would struggle to a 4–4 record and was replaced with Peete as the starter in the ninth game, against the University of Washington, which was a 20–17 loss. In the next game, he contributed to a 17–13 win against UCLA. Peete finished the season with a 2–2 record earning 50-of-85 completions (58.8%) for 566 yards, five passing touchdowns, three interceptions, 49 carries for 78 yards, and one rushing touchdown.

As a sophomore, Peete started all 12 games, while contributing to a 7–5 record. He completed 160-of-305 attempts (52.5%) for 2,138 yards, 10 passing touchdowns, 15 interceptions, 103 carries for 124 yards and three rushing touchdowns.

As a junior, Peete started all 12 games, while contributing to an 8–4 record. He set a school record with five touchdown passes against the University of Oregon. The team played in the 1988 Rose Bowl, losing 20–17 to Michigan State University. Peete's statistics on the season were: 197-of-332 completions (59.3%) for 2,709 yards, 21 touchdowns, 12 interceptions, 70 carries for 145 yards and three rushing touchdowns.

As a senior, Peete started all 12 games and had a 10–2 record. He posted 223-of-359 completions (62.1%) for 2,812 yards, 18 passing touchdowns, 12 interceptions, 68 carries for 68 yards and five rushing touchdowns. His teams would win both head-to-head matchups in the UCLA–USC rivalry against Troy Aikman's UCLA teams, with the 31–22 win being notable in that Peete was stricken with measles the week before the game and had been hospitalized. The Trojans lost 22–14 in the 1989 Rose Bowl against the University of Michigan. For his efforts, he was the second player ever and the first Trojan to win the Johnny Unitas Award as the nation's best senior quarterback (since earned by Carson Palmer and Matt Leinart as well). He was second to Barry Sanders and ahead of Aikman in the voting for the Heisman Trophy.

Peete finished his college career as the school's all-time leader in pass attempts (1,081), completions (630), passing yards (8,225), total offense (8,640) and starts (40). He also had 54 passing touchdowns, 42 interceptions, 290 carries for 415 yards and 12 rushing touchdowns.

In baseball, Peete played second base and shortstop as a freshman; although he was limited with a strained hamstring, he batted around .260 as part of a losing team. As a senior, he was the starter at third base, hitting .338 with 12 home runs and 46 RBIs, while receiving All-Pac-10 honors. In his three seasons of collegiate baseball, Peete batted .297 with 18 home runs and 84 RBIs. He was drafted three different times while at USC; in the 1988 MLB draft by the Oakland Athletics in the 14th round (359th overall), the 1989 MLB draft by the Athletics again in the 13th round (348th overall) and the 1990 MLB draft by the Detroit Tigers in the 28th round (742nd overall).

In 2009, Peete was inducted into the USC Athletic Hall of Fame. In 2014, he received the NCAA Silver Anniversary Award.

== Professional career ==
Pre-draft measurables
Height	Weight	40-yard dash	10-yard split	20-yard split	20-yard shuttle	Vertical jump
6 ft 0 1/2 in (1.84 m)	195 lb (88 kg)	4.72 s	1.60 s	2.74 s	4.53 s	29.0 in (0.74 m)
All values from NFL Combine

=== Detroit Lions ===
Peete was selected by the Detroit Lions in the 6th round (141st overall) of the 1989 NFL draft, after dropping because he was not considered to have the size or the arm talent needed to succeed in the NFL. He joined Barry Sanders on the team, as Sanders was taken by the Lions third overall in the 1989 draft.

As a rookie, Peete was scheduled to start the season opener, but sprained his knee in the final preseason game, against the Los Angeles Rams, missing the first three games of the season and being replaced with Bob Gagliano. He would have been the first rookie quarterback to start for the Lions since 1968 when Greg Landry started. Peete completed 17-of-31 for 268 yards, one passing touchdown, 10 carries for 78 yards, and one rushing touchdown in a 17–16 win against the Tampa Bay Buccaneers that earned him NFC Offensive Player-of-the-Week honors. He finished with eight starts, while completing 103-of-195 attempts for 1,479 yards and five passing touchdowns.

In 1990, Peete registered 142-of-271 completions (52.4%) for 1,974 yards, 13 passing touchdowns, 48 carries for 365 yards (second on the team), and six rushing touchdowns. He ranked fifth in the NFC with 79.8 rating points and his interception percentage (3.0%) was the second lowest in franchise history. Peete had a career-high eight carries for 97 rushing yards, including 17-of-26 completions and one rushing touchdown in the third game against the Tampa Bay Buccaneers. He suffered a pulled hamstring in the fourth game against the Green Bay Packers, which forced him to miss the next two contests. Peete returned in the seventh game, against the New Orleans Saints, contributing to a 27–10 win with 16-of-25 completions for 246 yards, one passing touchdown and 38 rushing yards. He suffered a left pulled hamstring in the next game against the Washington Redskins, leaving with a 35–21 lead that the team could not hold, losing 38–41 in overtime. Peete missed the next three contests and returned to action in the fourteenth game, against the Chicago Bears, helping the team score 21 first quarter points (franchise record), while throwing a career-high four touchdowns.

In 1991, Peete started the first eight games, before suffering a season ending Achilles tendon injury against the Dallas Cowboys. Peete had guided the team to a 5–2 record. He had career-highs of 25-of-38 completions, to go with 271 yards and one passing touchdown in the 23–14 win against the Green Bay Packers. He was replaced by Erik Kramer, who led the team to the NFC Championship Game against the Washington Redskins. Peete was placed on the injured reserve list on October 30.

In 1992, Peete started 10 games, making 123-of-213 completions (57.7%) for 1,702 yards and nine passing touchdowns. In the fourth game, against the Tampa Bay Buccaneers, he had 20-of-31 completions for 323 yards (career high) and one 78-yard touchdown pass. Peete passed for three touchdowns in the seventh game against the Tampa Bay Buccaneers.

In 1993, Peete had a career-high 62.3% completion percentage (second in franchise history), while starting 10 games. He suffered an injury in the third game that forced him to miss two contests. Peete still was able to lead the team to six wins in his first seven starts. Peete had 20-of-28 completions for 273 yards, scoring 17 fourth quarter points to overcome a 13–27 deficit and also completed a 93-yard touchdown pass (career high) in the eighth game, against the Minnesota Vikings. He was the team's third-string quarterback behind Kramer and former Heisman Trophy winner Andre Ware for the last four regular season games.

=== Dallas Cowboys ===
On May 3, 1994, Peete signed as a free agent with the Dallas Cowboys, to replace Bernie Kosar as Troy Aikman's backup. In the seventh game, against the Arizona Cardinals, Aikman suffered a concussion on the first possession and Peete replaced him, throwing two touchdown passes in a 28–21 victory. In the eleventh game, against the Washington Redskins, he substituted an injured Aikman (sprained left knee), but suffered a sprained right thumb and also had to be replaced, with third-string quarterback Jason Garrett in the 31–7 win. In the thirteenth game, against the Philadelphia Eagles, Peete started in place of an injured Aikman, tallying 172 passing yards, one touchdown and one interception in a 31–19 win. In the season finale against the New York Giants, he entered the game with 4:49 minutes left in the first half, making 6-of-8 completions for 50 yards and no touchdowns in a 15–10 loss.

=== Philadelphia Eagles ===
On April 22, 1995, Peete was signed as a free agent by the Philadelphia Eagles. New head coach Ray Rhodes, implemented the West Coast offense and named Peete the starter over quarterback Randall Cunningham, after the team got off to a 1–3 start. He would go on to start in 12 games with a 9–3 record, posting 215-of-375 completions (57.3%) for 2,326 yards, eight touchdowns and 14 interceptions.

On March 14, 1996, Peete re-signed with the Eagles. He lost his starting job to Ty Detmer, after he tore his patella tendon. Peete started five games (3–2 record), making 80-of-134 completions (59.7%) for 992 yards, three touchdowns and five interceptions.

In 1998, Bobby Hoying was named the starter and the team got off to a 1–6 start. The rest of the season, Koy Detmer and Peete split time at quarterback.

On April 28, 1999, Peete was traded to the Washington Redskins in exchange for a 2000 sixth round pick (#192-John Romero).

=== Washington Redskins ===
In 1999, Peete was the backup quarterback behind Brad Johnson. He appeared in three games, collecting 8-of-17 completions (47.1%) for 107 yards, two touchdowns and one interception. Peete became the first quarterback to throw a regular season pass for three different NFC East clubs.

=== Oakland Raiders ===
On July 13, 2000, Peete was signed by the Oakland Raiders, reuniting with head coach Jon Gruden, who was his offensive coordinator with the Eagles. He was the third-string quarterback behind Rich Gannon and Bobby Hoying. Peete did not appear in any game.

On September 2, 2001, Peete was released after being passed on the depth chart by rookie Marques Tuiasosopo. On September 29, he re-signed with the Raiders, after Hoying injured ligaments in his throwing elbow. Peete appeared in one game and did not register any statistics.

=== Carolina Panthers ===
On March 28, 2002, Peete was signed as a free agent by the Carolina Panthers. At 37 years old, Peete's career appeared to be over until he was named the starter over Chris Weinke, leading the team to a 3–0 start and ultimately finishing with a 7–9 record, an improvement over 1–15 the year before. He registered career highs of 14 starts, 223-of-381 completions, 2,630 passing yards, 15 passing touchdowns, 14 interceptions and a passer rating of 77.4.

In 2003, after a weak showing in the first half of the season opener against the Jacksonville Jaguars, head coach John Fox replaced Peete in the third quarter with Jake Delhomme, who then led the Panthers to a comeback victory. Delhomme replaced Peete as starting quarterback for the rest of the season, leading the team to an 11–5 record and the Super Bowl XXXVIII game against the New England Patriots.

On February 28, 2005, Peete was released for salary cap reasons, but he chose to retire instead of re-signing with the Panthers for another season with a lower salary. Peete finished his career with the most NFL career passing yards among quarterbacks from USC, a record that was eventually eclipsed by Carson Palmer.

Peete finished his career with 1,344 completions in 2,346 attempts, for 16,338 passing yards, 76 passing touchdowns, 92 interceptions and a passer rating of 73.3.

== Career statistics ==
=== NFL ===
Legend
	Led the league
**Bold**	Career high

==== Regular season ====
Year	Team	Games			Passing									Rushing					Sacks	
Year	Team	GP	GS	Record	Cmp	Att	Pct	Yds	Y/A	Lng	TD	Int	Rtg	Att	Yds	Avg	Lng	TD	Sck	Yds
1989	DET	8	8	3-5	103	195	52.8	1,479	7.6	69	5	9	67.0	33	148	4.5	14	4	27	164
1990	DET	11	11	4-7	142	271	52.4	1,974	7.3	68	13	8	79.8	**47**	**363**	**7.7**	**37**	**6**	27	173
1991	DET	8	8	6-2	116	194	59.8	1,339	6.9	68	5	9	69.9	25	125	5.0	26	2	11	42
1992	DET	10	10	2-8	123	213	57.7	1,702	8.0	78	9	9	80.0	21	83	4.0	12	0	28	170
1993	DET	10	10	6-4	157	252	62.3	1,670	6.6	**93**	6	**14**	66.4	45	165	3.7	28	1	**34**	174
1994	DAL	7	1	1-0	33	56	58.9	470	**8.4**	65	4	1	**102.5**	9	-2	-0.2	2	0	4	21
1995	PHI	**15**	12	**9-3**	215	375	57.3	2,326	6.2	37	8	**14**	67.3	32	147	4.6	18	1	33	166
1996	PHI	5	5	3-2	80	134	59.7	992	7.4	62	3	5	74.6	20	31	1.6	11	1	11	53
1997	PHI	5	3	2-1	68	118	57.6	869	7.4	38	4	4	78.0	8	37	4.6	16	0	17	85
1998	PHI	5	4	1-3	71	129	55.0	758	5.9	25	2	4	64.7	5	30	6.0	19	1	16	103
1999	WAS	3	0	0-0	8	17	47.1	107	6.3	30	2	1	82.2	2	-1	-0.5	0	0	2	9
2001	OAK	1	0	0-0	0	0	0.0	0	0.0	0	0	0	0.0	0	0	0.0	0	0	0	0
2002	CAR	14	**14**	7-7	**223**	**381**	58.5	**2,630**	6.9	69	**15**	**14**	77.4	22	14	0.6	10	0	31	**192**
2003	CAR	1	1	1-0	4	10	40.0	19	1.9	8	0	0	47.9	0	0	0.0	0	0	3	20
2004	CAR	1	0	0-0	1	1	**100.0**	3	3.0	3	0	0	79.2	1	-1	-1.0	-1	0	0	0
Career		104	87	45-42	1,344	2,346	57.3	16,338	7.0	93	76	92	73.3	270	1,139	4.2	37	16	244	1,372

==== Playoffs ====
Year	Team	Games			Passing									Rushing					Sacks	
Year	Team	GP	GS	Record	Cmp	Att	Pct	Yds	Y/A	Lng	TD	Int	Rtg	Att	Yds	Avg	Lng	TD	Sck	Yds
1994	DAL	1	0	0-0	0	2	0.0	0	0.0	0	0	0	39.6	0	0	0.0	0	0	0	0
1995	PHI	**2**	**2**	**1-1**	**20**	**30**	**66.7**	**298**	**9.9**	**45**	**3**	0	**132.4**	**3**	**20**	**6.7**	**17**	0	**2**	**16**
Career		104	87	45-42	1,344	2,346	57.3	16,338	7.0	93	76	92	73.3	270	1,139	4.2	37	16	244	1,372

=== College ===
Season	Team	GP	Passing							Rushing		
Season	Team	GP	Cmp	Att	Pct	Yds	TD	Int	Rtg	Att	Yds	TD
1985	USC	12	50	85	58.8	566	5	3	127.1	49	78	1
1986	USC	12	160	305	52.5	2,138	10	15	112.3	103	124	3
1987	USC	12	197	332	59.3	2,709	21	12	141.5	70	145	3
1988	USC	12	223	359	62.1	2,812	18	12	137.8	68	68	5
Total		48	630	1,081	58.3	8,225	54	42	130.9	290	415	12

== Entertainment career ==
After his retirement from the NFL, Peete became one of the hosts of the Fox Sports Networks sports talk show The Best Damn Sports Show Period alongside John Salley, Chris Rose, and Rob Dibble. In 2015, the Oprah Winfrey Network announced that they were making a docuseries on Peete and his family.

Rodney Peete and his wife Holly Robinson Peete star in Lipozene commercials on television.

In 2019, Rodney Peete co-hosted the Hallmark Kitten Bowl.

Rodney Peete currently serves as co-host (alongside former KNBC sportscaster Fred Roggin) of Roggin and Rodney, on Los Angeles sports radio station KLAC radio (570AM), focusing on Southern California sports.

== Personal life ==
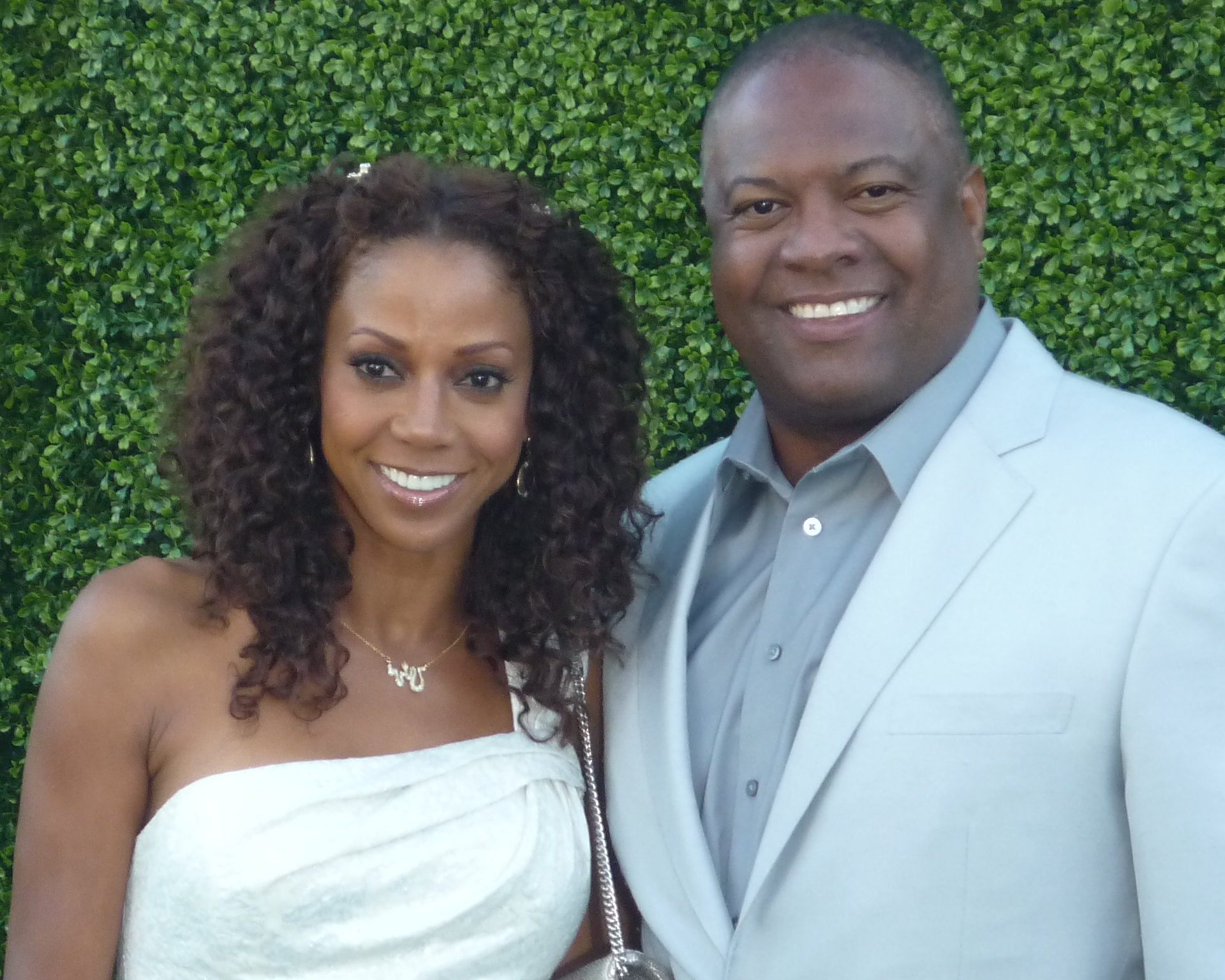
Rodney Peete with his wife Holly Robinson Peete in 2010

Peete has been married to actress Holly Robinson Peete since 1995. They have four children. One of their children, Rodney Peete Jr., was diagnosed on the autism spectrum at age three. He discusses his relationship with his autistic child in the June 2010 issue of Men's Health. As of 2023, Rodney Peete Jr. is now working for the Dodgers.

Peete is the son of Willie Peete, former running backs coach of the Kansas City Chiefs and Chicago Bears. His brother is NFL coach Skip Peete. He is the son-in-law of late actor Matt Robinson, and the cousin of the late professional golfer Calvin Peete.
