= Hip-hop production =

Creation of hip-hop music in a recording studio

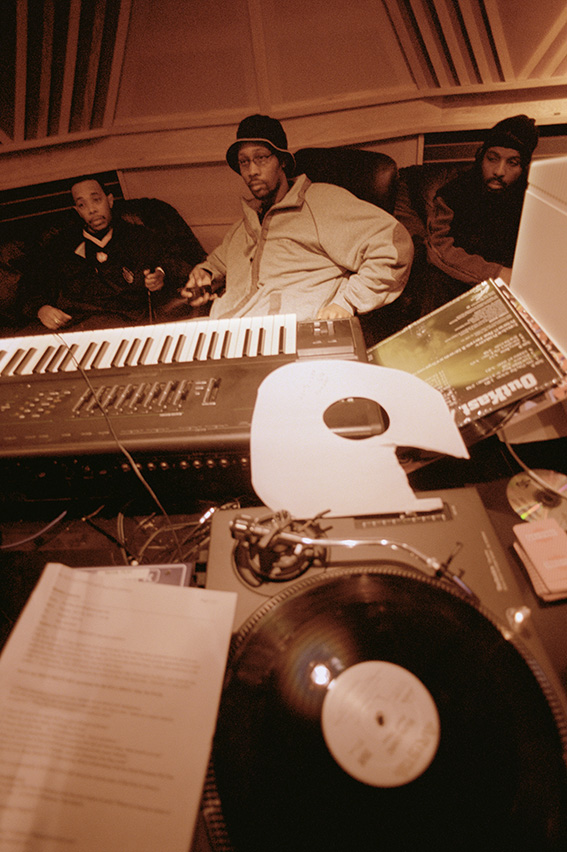
Hip-hop producer and rapper RZA in a music studio with two collaborators. Pictured in the foreground is a synthesizer keyboard and a number of vinyl records; both of these items are key tools that producers and DJs use to create hip-hop beats.

Hip-hop production is the creation of hip-hop in a recording studio. While the term encompasses all aspects of hip-hop music creation, including recording the rapping of an MC, a turntablist or DJ providing a beat, using samples and "scratching" using record players and the creation of a rhythmic backing track, and using a drum machine or sequencer, it is most commonly used to refer to recording the instrumental, non-lyrical and non-vocal aspects of hip-hop.

== Music production ==
Hip-hop producers may be credited as the record producer or songwriter; they may also supervise recording sessions.

== History ==
Hip-hop, the dominant turn-of-the-century pop form, gives the most electrifying demonstration of technology's empowering effect [...] The genre rose up from desperately impoverished high-rise ghettos, where families couldn't afford to buy instruments for their kids and even the most rudimentary music-making seemed out of reach. But music was made all the same: the phonograph itself became an instrument. In the South Bronx in the 1970s, DJs like Kool Herc, Afrika Bambaataa, and Grandmaster Flash used turntables to create a hurtling collage of effects—loops, breaks, beats, scratches. Later, studio-bound DJs and beat maker's used digital sampling to assemble some of the most densely packed sonic assemblages in musical history: Eric B. and Rakim's Paid in Full, Public Enemy's Fear of a Black Planet, Dr. Dre's The Chronic.

— Alex Ross, Listen to This (2010)

=== 1980s ===
The Roland TR-808 drum machine was introduced in 1980, which was an analog machine with a step-programming method. The 808 was heavily used by Afrika Bambaataa, who released "Planet Rock" in 1982, in addition to the electro hip hip groundbreaking classic "Nunk" by Warp 9, produced by Lotti Golden and Richard Scher, giving rise to the fledgling Electro genre. An especially notable artist is the genre's own pioneer Juan Atkins who released what is generally accepted as the first American techno record, "Clear" in 1984 (later sampled by Missy Elliott). These early electro records laid down the foundations that later Detroit techno artists such as Derrick May built upon. In 1983, Run-DMC recorded "It's Like That" and "Sucker M.C.'s," two songs which relied completely on synthetic sounds, in this case via an Oberheim DMX drum machine, ignoring samples entirely.

Kurtis Blow was the first hip-hop artist to use a digital sampler, when he used the Fairlight CMI on his 1984 album Ego Trip, specially on the track "AJ Scratch". The E-mu SP-12 came out in 1985, capable of 2.5 seconds of recording time. The E-mu SP-1200 promptly followed (1987) with an expanded recording time of 10 seconds, divided on 4 banks. One of the earliest songs to contain a drum loop or break was "Rhymin' and Stealin'" by the Beastie Boys, produced by Rick Rubin. Marley Marl also popularized a style of restructuring drum loops by sampling individual drum hits in the mid-1980s, a technique that was popularized by the MC Shan's 1986 single "The Bridge," which used chops of "Impeach the President" on two Korg Delay/sampling triggered by a Roland TR-808. The Akai MPC60 came out in 1988, capable of 12 seconds of sampling time. The Beastie Boys released Paul's Boutique in 1989, an entire album created completely from an eclectic mix of samples, produced by the Dust Brothers using an Emax sampler.

=== 1990s–present ===
Public Enemy's Bomb Squad revolutionized the sound of hip-hop with dense production styles, combining tens of samples per song, often combining percussion breaks with a drum machine. Their beats were much more structured than the early more minimal and repetitive beats. The MPC3000 was released in 1994, the AKAI MPC2000 in 1997, followed by the MPC2000XL in 1999 and the MPC2500 in 2006. These machines combined a sampling drum machine with an onboard MIDI sequencer and became the centerpiece of many hip-hop producers' studios. Wu Tang Clan's producer RZA is often credited for getting hip-hop attention away from Dr. Dre's more polished sound in 1993. RZA's more gritty sound with low rumbling bass, sharp snare drum sounds and unique sampling style based on Ensoniq sampler. With the 1994 release of The Notorious B.I.G.'s Ready to Die, Sean Combs and his assistant producers pioneered a new style where entire sections of records were sampled, instead of short snippets, à la MC Hammer's "U Can't Touch This".

Memories
A track by Soulker self-described as a "Xavier Wulf Type Beat"

Starting in the 2010s, amateur producers began releasing "type beats", instrumentals imitating the style of particular rappers or producers, on platforms such as YouTube, SoundCloud, and Audiomack. "Type beat" producers will often lease non-exclusive rights to instrumentals for lower prices more accessible to smaller artists.

== Elements ==
=== Drum beat ===
The drum beat is a core element of hip-hop production. While some beats are sampled, others are created by drum machines. The most widely used drum machine is the analog Roland TR-808, which has remained a mainstay for decades. Digital samplers, such as the E-mu SP-12 and SP-1200, and the Akai MPC series, have also been used to sample drum beats. Others yet are a hybrid of the two techniques, sampled parts of drum machine beats that are arranged in original patterns altogether.

=== Sampling ===
Hip-hop does not simply draw inspiration from a range of samples, but it layers these fragments into an artistic object. If sampling is the first level of hip-hop aesthetics, how the pieces or elements fit together constitute the second level. Hip-hop emphasizes and calls attention to its layered nature. The aesthetic code of hip-hop does not seek to render invisible the layers of samples, sounds, references, images, and metaphors. Rather, it aims to create a collage in which the sampled texts augment and deepen the song/book/art's meaning to those who can decode the layers of meaning.

— Richard Schur, Hip Hop Aesthetics and Contemporary African American Literature (2008)

Sampling is using a segment of another's musical recording as part of one's own recording. It has been integral to hip-hop production since its inception. In hip-hop, the term describes a technique of splicing out or copying sections of other songs and rearranging or reworking these sections into cohesive musical patterns, or "loops." This technique was first fully explored in 1982 by Afrika Bambaata, on the Soulsonic Force tape Planet Rock, which sampled parts of dance act Kraftwerk and experienced vast public acclaim. This was followed up on in 1986: then-Def Jam producer Rick Rubin used Black Sabbath and Led Zeppelin loops in creating the Beastie Boys' debut Licensed to Ill, and the following year rap duo Eric B. & Rakim popularized James Brown samples with their album Paid in Full.

The technique took a bi-coastal turn when discovered by a young Dr. Dre, whose first gig was the DJ of Afrika Bambaata-esque electrofunk group, the World Class Wreckin' Cru. Dre began his use of sampling in hip-hop when he produced the N.W.A album Straight Outta Compton (1989), a landmark in the genre of gangsta rap. Also in 1989, Jazz-sampling pioneers Gang Starr followed in 1991 by Pete Rock & CL Smooth and A Tribe Called Quest both appeared on the scene, popularizing their brand, and sampling took on a full role in hip-hop, spreading to prominence in high-profile projects like the Wu-Tang Clan's Enter the Wu-Tang: 36 Chambers, Dr. Dre's The Chronic, Nas' Illmatic and Notorious B.I.G.'s Ready to Die.

In the 2000s, sampling began to reach an all-time high; Jay-Z's album The Blueprint helped put producers Kanye West and Just Blaze on the map for their sampling of soul records. Kanye West himself scored early hits with "Through the Wire" and "Jesus Walks", often considered by West as "chipmunk soul", due to its sped up vocals on both songs. His 2004 album, The College Dropout, included two sampled hits featuring Twista which led to the Chicago rapper's Kamikaze selling platinum. On September 7, 2004, however, a U.S. Court of Appeals in Nashville changed the nature of musical copyright infringement by ruling that a license is needed in every case of sampling, where previously a small portion of the song could be copied without repercussion. The law immediately began rarefying samples in hip-hop; in a 2005 interview with Scratch magazine, Dr. Dre announced he was moving more toward instrumentation, and in 2006 The Notorious B.I.G.'s 1994 debut album Ready to Die was temporarily pulled from shelves for a retroactive sample clearance issue. As a result, more major producers and artists have moved further away from sampling and toward live instrumentation, such as Wu-Tang's RZA and Mos Def.

Instruments used in hip-hop production
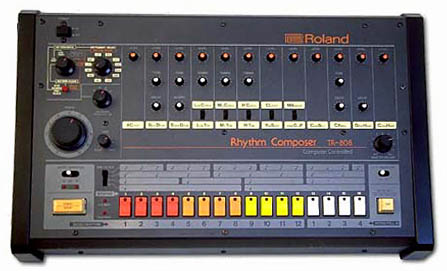
Roland TR-808 drum machine

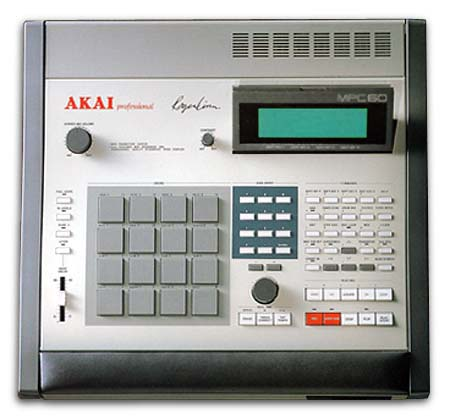
Akai MPC60 sequencer/sampler

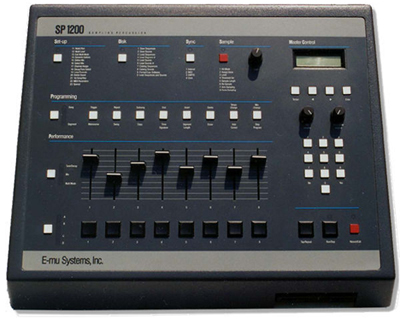
E-mu SP-1200 sampler

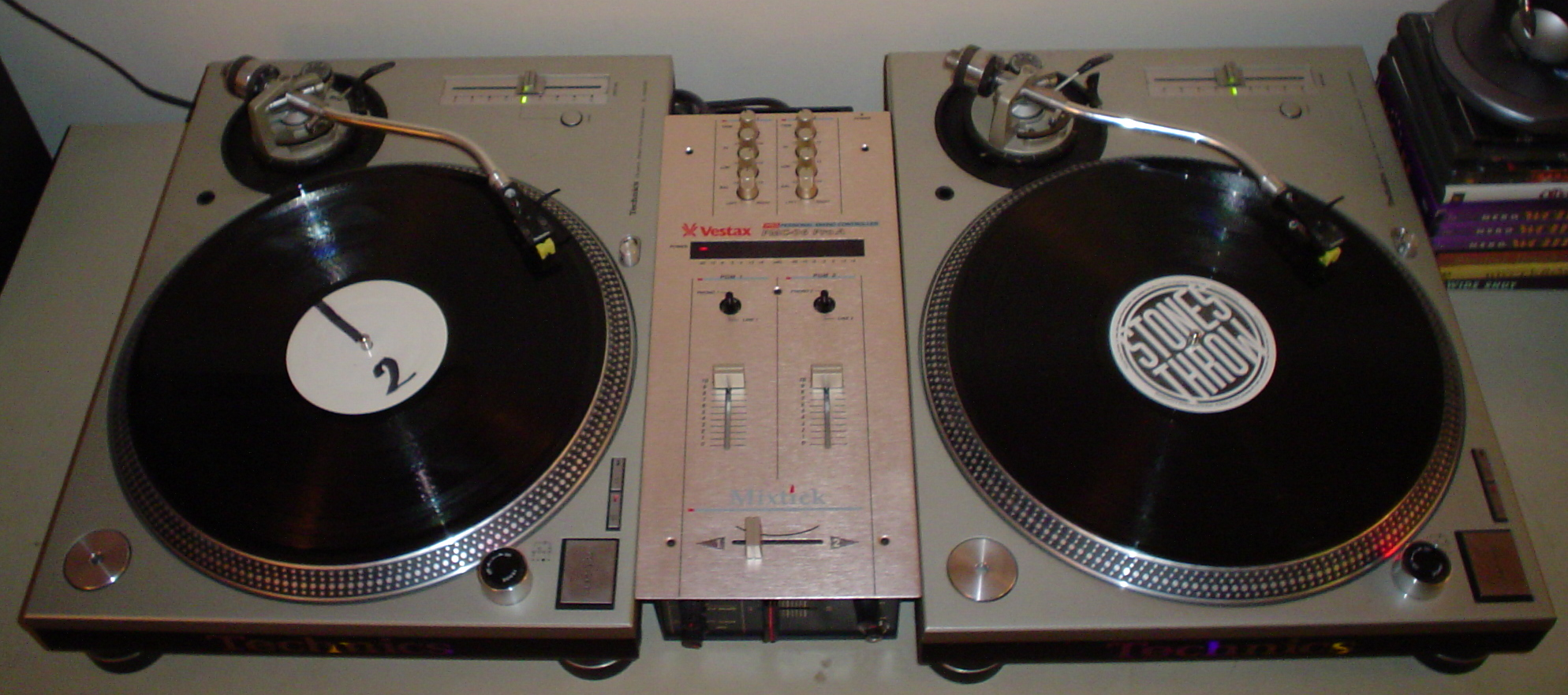
Two Technics SL-1200 turntables and a small DJ mixer

=== Samplers ===
Because hip-hop production revolves around sampling, a sampler/sequencer combination device such as Akai's MPC line of grooveboxes usually forms the centerpiece of a hip-hop production studio. Although mostly replaced by Digital Audio Workstations (DAWs) today, classic samplers like the E-mu Systems SP-1200, Akai MPC60, Akai MPC3000 or Ensoniq ASR-10 still see use today due to their workflow and sound characteristics.

=== Turntables ===
The most widely used turntables in hip-hop are Panasonic's Technics series. They were the first direct-drive turntables, which eliminated belts, and instead employed a motor to directly drive the platter on which a vinyl record rests. The Technics SL-1100 was adopted by early hip-hop artists in the 1970s, due to its strong motor, durability and fidelity. A forefather of turntablism was DJ Kool Herc, an immigrant from Jamaica to New York City. He introduced turntable techniques from Jamaican dub music, while developing new techniques made possible by the direct-drive turntable technology of the Technics SL-1100, which he used for the first sound system he set up after emigrating to New York in the 1970s. The signature technique he developed was playing two copies of the same record on two turntables in alternation to extend the b-dancers' favorite section, switching back and forth between the two to loop the breaks to a rhythmic beat.

The most influential turntable was the Technics SL-1200. It was adopted by New York City hip-hop DJs such as Grand Wizard Theodore and Afrika Bambaataa in the 1970s. As they experimented with the SL-1200 decks, they developed scratching techniques when they found that the motor would continue to spin at the correct RPM even if the DJ wiggled the record back and forth on the platter. Since then, turntablism spread widely in hip-hop culture, and the SL-1200 remained the most widely used turntable in DJ culture for the next several decades.

=== Recording ===
In hip-hop, a multi-track recorder is standard for recording. The Portastudio cassette recorder was the law in the in-house recording studios in the 1980s. Digital ADAT tape recorders became standard during the 1990s, but have been largely replaced by Digital Audio Workstations or DAWs such as Apple's Logic, Avid's Pro Tools and Steinberg's Nuendo and Cubase. DAWs allow for more intricate editing and unlimited track counts, as well as built-in effects. This allows songwriters and composers to create music without the expense of a large commercial studio.

==== Vocal recording ====
Generally, professional producers opt for a condenser microphone for studio recording, mostly due to their wide-range response and high quality. A primary alternative to the expensive condenser microphone is the dynamic microphone, used more often in live performances due to its durability. The major disadvantages of condenser microphones are their expense and fragility. Also, most condenser microphones require phantom power, unlike dynamic microphones. Conversely, the disadvantages of dynamic microphones are they do not generally possess the wide spectrum of condenser microphones and their frequency response is not as uniform.

=== Mixing ===
Mixing is the process of blending audio elements together to create a cohesive sound that clearly conveys the artist’s intended experience for the listener. This process is the final step of music production, after songwriting, arrangement, and recording have been completed. Mixing involves adjusting audio tracks and applying tools such as equalizers, compression, and effects. The purpose of this is to produce a final product where all the elements in the song complement each other to create an intended listening experience. Mixing is considered a creative process, as there is no definite right or wrong way to mix a song. Each mixing engineer mixes with their own style and inputs their own creative intent to the track. Rhythm and vocals are the most important aspects of the hip-hop genre, and it is crucial to consider this when mixing.

Vocals are one of the most essential elements to the overall sound of hip-hop tracks and attract the most attention. They are often mixed with heavy processing, including equalization (EQ), compression, and the use of effects such as reverb and delay. In modern hip-hop, auto-tune has become a defining characteristic and adds a stylized, almost robotic effect to the artist's voice. Occasionally, vocal mixing can also include effects such as saturation or pitch modulation to bring a certain stylistic sound.

Mixing the beat in hip-hop involves having a strong low-end that complements the vocals. Most hip-hop beats consist of elements such as the 808 bass, kick, snare, hi-hats, and melodic instruments such as synths or samples. Having a good mix means every element should be distinguishable with its own place in the sonic soundscape. Each element should complement the others, with the sub-bass frequencies in particular. The sub-bass frequencies, which include the 808 and the kick, can often clash and cause muddiness when they play at the same time. To avoid the clash, EQ and sidechain compression are often used to carve out distinct spaces for each element, allowing the kick to punch through between the sustained 808 bass.

Panning and managing the stereo field are important in creating space in the mix. Typically, instruments such as hi-hats, cymbals, and other various background elements are panned to different parts of the stereo field. The vocals, 808, kick, and snare are left in the center. This arrangement of panning will avoid clashing between the vocals and main drums, while creating width and immersion.

Special effects such as reverb, delay, and distortion are at times, used sparingly. Reverb is used to add depth and space, while delay is used to create rhythm between the vocal and instrumental elements. Small amounts of saturation can be applied to the drums for more presence, or vocals to add warmth and harmonics.

=== Digital audio workstations ===
DAWs and software sequencers are used in modern hip-hop production for the composer, as software production products are cheaper, easier to expand, and require less room to run than their hardware counterparts. The success of these DAWs generated a flood of new semi-professional beatmakers, who license their beats or instrumentals preferably on digital marketplaces to rap artists from all around the world and caused the creation of a new niche market. Some Beatmakers oppose complete reliance on DAWs and software, citing lower overall quality, lack of effort, and lack of identity in computer-generated beats. Sequencing software often comes under criticism from purist listeners and traditional producers as producing sounds that are flat, overly clean, overly compressed, and less human because it's all computer-generated.

Popular DAWs used in hip-hop production include the following:

- Ableton Live
- Acoustica Mixcraft
- Adobe Audition
- Apple's Logic Pro
- Avid Technology's Pro Tools
- Cakewalk SONAR
- Steinberg Cubase
- Image-Line's FL Studio
- PreSonus’s Studio One
- Reason Studios
- Sony ACID Pro
- Apple's GarageBand
- Motu Inc. Digital Performer
- Cockos REAPER
- Ardour

=== Live instrumentation ===
Live instrumentation is not as widespread in hip-hop, but is used by a number of acts and is prominent in hip-hop-based fusion genres such as rapcore. Before samplers and synthesizers became prominent parts of hip-hop production, early hip-hop hits such as "Rapper's Delight" (The Sugarhill Gang) and "The Breaks" (Kurtis Blow) were recorded with live studio bands. During the 1980s, Stetsasonic was a pioneering example of a live hip-hop band. Hip-hop with live instrumentation regained prominence during the late-1990s and early 2000s with the work of The Goats, The Coup, The Roots, Mello-D and the Rados, Common, DJ Quik, UGK and OutKast, among others. In recent years, The Robert Glasper Experiment has explored live instrumentation with an emphasis on the instrumental and improvisational aspect of hip-hop with rappers such as Mos Def, Talib Kweli, Q-Tip, and Common as well as neo-soul singer Bilal Oliver.

=== Drumming and hip-hop ===
Throughout history, the drum set has taken numerous identities. It is the instrument that makes jazz "swing" and rock 'n' roll "rock." With a new age of pop music on the rise within the past decade, it is easy to assume the drum set has been replaced by electronic sounds produced by an engineer. In reality, the drum set is the reason behind the production of these electronic beats, and live drummers contribute to modern-day hip-hop much more than what meets the ear.

An example of a drummer recording on a hip-hop record is Kendrick Lamar's album titled To Pimp A Butterfly, which was released in 2015. Robert Sput Searight, drummer of Snarky Puppy, performed on the tracks titled "For Free" and "Hood Politics." When performing live, Lamar would often employ a live band as opposed to most live hip-hop that use a pre-recorded backing track. The non-musician may find the use of a live drummer on a hip-hop recording unnoticeable, however, these musicians should receive credit for their work. The list below names some of the most influential drummers of the hip-hop genre.

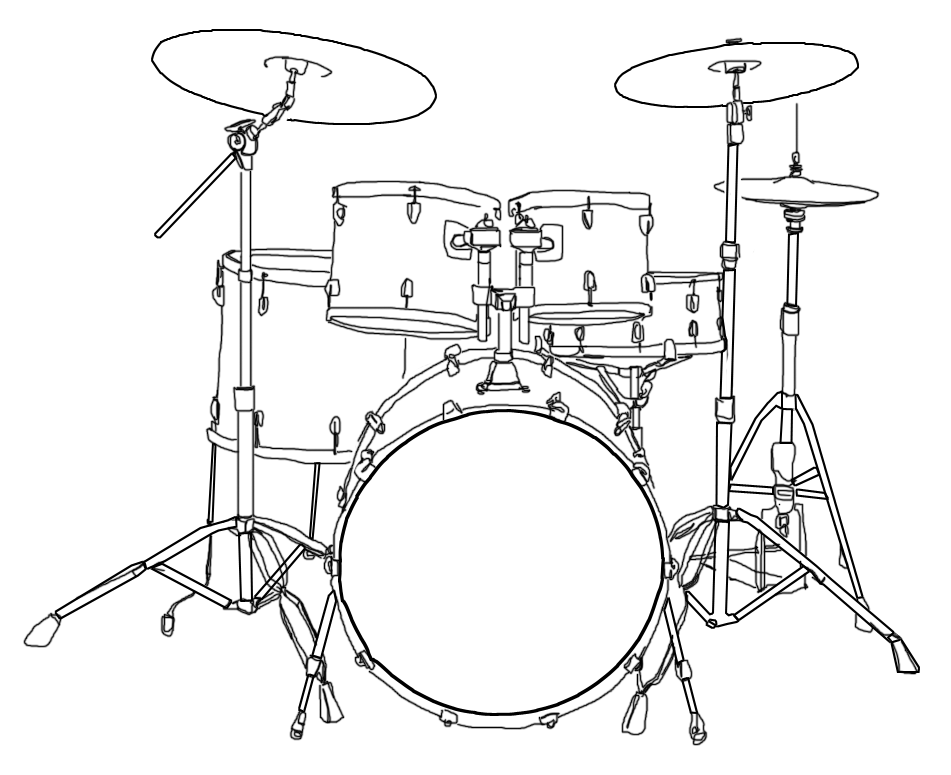

Other hip-hop drummers include the following:

- Questlove
- J Dilla
- Pharrell Williams
- Tony Royster Jr.
- Chris Dave
- Karriem Riggins
- Adam Deitch
- Papi Yerr

== Instrumental hip-hop ==
Instrumental hip-hop is hip-hop without vocals. Hip-hop as a general rule consists of two elements: an instrumental track (the "beat") and a vocal track (the "rap"). The artist who crafts the beat is the producer (or beatmaker), and the one who crafts the rap is the MC (emcee). In this format, the rap is almost always the primary focus of the song, providing most of the complexity and variation over a fairly repetitive beat. Instrumental hip-hop is hip-hop without an emcee rapping. This format gives the producer the flexibility to create more complex, richly detailed and varied instrumentals. Songs of this genre may wander off in different musical directions and explore various subgenres, because the instruments do not have to supply a steady beat for an MC. Although producers have made and released hip-hop beats without MCs since hip-hop's inception, those records rarely became well-known. Jazz keyboardist/composer Herbie Hancock and bassist/producer Bill Laswell's electro-inspired collaborations are notable exceptions. 1983's Future Shock album and hit single "Rockit" featured turntablist Grand Mixer D.ST, the first use of turntables in jazz fusion, and gave the turntablism and record "scratching" widespread exposure.

== Types of producers ==
In contemporary hip-hop production, the title producer has become a catch-all term that could indicate one or many types of contributions to any particular project. It is further complicated by the fact that the music industry has only three main categories to identify musical contributions – artist, producer, and songwriter – which often overlap in 21st-century music production. Below are some of the different facets of the contemporary hip-hop producer; a single production credit can involve any number of these roles.

Record producer
A seasoned music studio personnel who provides creative and technical guidance to an artist or band. In this role, they typically do not receive songwriting credits if they do not contribute to the composition of the musical production.

- e.g. Rick Rubin, Mike Spencer, and Ron Fair.

Executive producer
The topmost advisor on a project who facilitates business dealings and management; can also be a single creative visionary who brings together other producers and artists.

- e.g. Kendrick Lamar's curation of Black Panther (2018), Future's curation of Superfly (2018), Mike Will Made It's curation of Creed II: The Album (2018).

Primary artist
A non-recording hip-hop artist, also can include rap artists who contribute to composing some of their own music (as opposed to artists in other genres who are not generally given a producer credit if they write the music).

- e.g. Madlib, The Alchemist, and Metro Boomin

Featured artist
Prominent producers are often given a featured artist credit when they produce a song with the primary artist.

- e.g. Pete Rock featured on Run–DMC's "Down with the King", Mike Will Made It featured on Polo G's "Go Stupid", and DJ Mustard featured on will.i.am's "Feelin' Myself".

Beatmaker
Composers who program the music generally, either from scratch or with samples, employing a digital audio workstation and DJ skills including the use of drum machines and MIDI instrumentation.

- e.g. David Guetta, Skrillex, Tay Keith, and Wheezy.

Composer/songwriter
Personnel who only write and compose a song's music and sometimes lyrics in a more traditional sense; additionally, musicians who provide instrumentation.
Sample producer
Composers who write music and compose a library of loops (otherwise known as kits) for the purpose of being easily manipulated by other producers. They often receive producer credits despite not having direct involvement with the song in question.

- e.g. Frank Dukes, CuBeatz, and PVLACE.

Sampled artist
Artists whose work is sampled by a producer (however, this is generally given a songwriter credit).
Producer credited for "additional" or "miscellaneous" production
Commonly, artists who provide instrumentation on a track. Can also indicate a sampled artist or any minor musical contribution.

- e.g. BADBADNOTGOOD on Daniel Caesar's "Get You"

Remix artist
Artists who remix other's work may be credited as a producer as opposed to the primary artist.

== See also ==
- Turntablism
- Record producer
- Electronic music
- Audio engineer
