= It's a Beat Wave =

Album by Warp 9

Studio album by Warp 9
- Released: 1983
- Genre: Electro; boogie; soul; dance-pop
- Length: 73:14
- Label: Prism
- Producer: Lotti Golden & Richard Scher; John "Jellybean" Benitez

Warp 9 chronology
It's a Beat Wave (1983)	Fade in, Fade Out (1986)

It's a Beat Wave is the debut album by American electro group Warp 9. Released in 1983, the album's producers, Lotti Golden and Richard Scher, "worked real emotion and intelligence into the world of experimental hip-hop and electro." Warp 9 was the moniker under which Golden and Scher created their brand of electro-futurism. The group's first single, "Nunk,"(1982), secured Warp 9's album deal with New York independent label Prism Records. The LP was released in 1983 in conjunction with the group's 3rd single, "Beat Wave." Warp 9's large following in the New York metropolitan area came to the attention of Island Records chief Chris Blackwell who signed Warp 9 to a world wide deal on Island Records (Prism Records/Island Records in the U.S.).

Richard Scher is credited with the arrangements, drum programming and keyboards, The group's members Chuck Wansley and Boe Brown, provide additional drums and percussion, joined by Steve Thornton from the Miles Davis Septet. Lead and backing vocals are by Warp 9's Ada Dyer, Chuck Wansley, and Boe Brown. Additional vocals were provided by Catherine Russell, Lotti Golden and Tina Fabrik. The album's mix was produced in collaboration with John "Jellybean" Benitez (who also co-produced "Nunk" and "Light Years Away") except for "No Man Is an Island" and "Master of the Mix" which were mixed and produced by Golden & Scher. The album's topics range from music production (the mixing itself) and alien visition to creation of ad-hoc music styles (one of them becoming the music genre, electro) and is unified in its electronic experimentation, hip hop language and afro-futurist message.

== CD version ==
In 1992, the album was remastered and re-released on CD by Canadian company Unidisc, featuring remixes that were previously omitted from the original LP release.

== Track listing ==
A side
No.	Title	Writer(s)	Length
1.	"Beat Wave"	Lotti Golden, Richard Scher	5:40
2.	"Master Of The Mix"	Golden, Scher	7:01
3.	"Nunk (New Wave Funk)"	Golden, Scher	7:15

B side
No.	Title	Writer(s)	Length
4.	"Light Years Away"	Golden, Scher	7:42
5.	"Light Years Away" (Dub)	Golden, Scher	5:19
6.	"No Man Is An Island"	Golden, Scher	6:14

1992 CD version
No.	Title	Length
9.	"Master Of The Mix" (Tony Humphries Remix)	6:53
10.	"Nunk (New Wave Funk)" (Instrumental)	8:18
11.	"No Man Is An Island" (12" Remix)	7:54
12.	"Mega Mix: Master Of The Mix/Light Years Away/Nunk (New Wave Funk)/No Man Is An Island" (Previously Unreleased)	10:45
