= Old-school hip-hop =

Historical musical period

- Other names: Disco-rap (early); old skool
- Stylistic origins: Poetry; jazz; funk; soul; disco; rhythm & blues; toasting; underground
- Cultural origins: Early 1970s, The Bronx, New York City, U.S

Other topics
- Hip-hop; Electro; Toasting

Old-school hip-hop, stylized as old school (originally known as disco-rap) is the earliest commercially recorded hip-hop music and the original style of the genre. It typically refers to the music created around 1973 to 1983, as well as any hip-hop that does not adhere to contemporary styles.

The image, styles and sounds of old-school hip-hop were exemplified by figures like Disco King Mario, DJ Hollywood, Grandmaster Flowers, Grand Wizzard Theodore, Grandmaster Flash, Afrika Bambaataa, DJ Kool Herc, Treacherous Three, Funky Four Plus One, Kurtis Blow, The Sugarhill Gang, Melle Mel, Super-Wolf, West Street Mob, Spoonie Gee, Kool Moe Dee, Busy Bee Starski, Lovebug Starski, The Cold Crush Brothers, Warp 9, T-Ski Valley, Grandmaster Caz, Doug E. Fresh, The Sequence, Jazzy Jay, Crash Crew, Rock Steady Crew, Fab Five Freddy, Jimmy Spicer, and Coke La Rock.

It is characterized by the more straightforward rapping techniques of the time and the general focus on party-related subject matter. The lyrics were usually not a very important part of old-school rap songs, but always included shoutouts to the artist's native New York City borough. Rap also emphasized the fashion of the time, whether it be Adidas, Kangol, Lee jeans, or the popular "Sheep dog" coats. However, there were some songs, such as Brother D's "How We Gonna Make the Black Nation Rise?" and Kurtis Blow's "Hard Times" (both released in 1980), that explored socially relevant ideas. The release of "The Message" in 1982, written by Duke Bootee and Melle Mel and credited to Grandmaster Flash and The Furious Five, marked the arrival of hip-hop as social commentary, making it possible for future artists like Public Enemy and N.W.A to create an identity based on socially conscious themes in later years. Fun rhymes, like the "Birthday Song" and "That’s the Joint" rocked the airwaves. Old-school rappers are widely respected by current hip-hop artists and fans, with many claiming they have contributed to the evolution of hip-hop.

== Musical characteristics and themes ==
Old-school hip-hop is noted for its relatively simple rapping techniques, compared to later hip-hop. Artists such as Melle Mel would use few syllables per bar of music, with simple rhythms and a moderate tempo.

Much of the subject matter of old-school hip-hop centers around partying and having a good time. In the book How to Rap, Immortal Technique explains how party content played a big part in old-school hip-hop: "hip-hop was born in an era of social turmoil... in the same way that slaves used to sing songs on a plantation... that's the party songs that we used to have".

Battle rap was also a part of the old-school hip-hop aesthetic. While discussing battle rapping, Esoteric said, "a lot of my stuff stems from old school hip-hop, braggadocio ethic". A famous old-school hip-hop battle occurred in December 1981, when Kool Moe Dee challenged Busy Bee Starski. Busy Bee Starski's defeat by the more complex raps of Kool Moe Dee meant that "no longer was an MC just a crowd-pleasing comedian with a slick tongue; he was a commentator and a storyteller". in the documentary Beef, KRS-One also credits this as creating a shift in rapping.

Sci-fi/Afrofuturism was another theme introduced into hip-hop. The release of Planet Rock in 1982 was a game-changer, like "a light being switched on." The combination of electronic percussive propulsion and Afrika Bambaataa's rap sounded like "an orchestra being rocketed into outer space." "Light Years Away", by Warp 9 (1983), produced and written by Lotti Golden and Richard Scher, explored social commentary from a sci-fi perspective. A "cornerstone of early 80's beatbox afrofuturism", "Light Years Away" is characterized as "a brilliantly spare and sparse piece of electro hip-hop traversing inner and outer space."

Freestyle rap during hip-hop's old-school era was defined differently than today. Kool Moe Dee refers to this earlier definition in his book There's a God on the Mic: "There are two types of freestyle. There's an old-school freestyle that's basically rhymes that you've written that may not have anything to do with any subject or that goes all over the place. Then there's freestyle where you come off the top of the head". This is in contrast to the more recent definition which usually defines freestyle rap as "improvisational rap like a jazz solo". In old-school hip-hop, Kool Moe Dee says that improvisational rapping was instead called "coming off the top of the head".

Roland TR-808 rhythm
Roland TR-808 drum machine rhythm with accent trigger used in hip-hop musical context

Old-school hip-hop often sampled disco and funk tracks, such as "Good Times" by Chic, when performed live in the 1970s. Recorded hip-hop (such as Sugarhill Gang's "Rapper's Delight") would use a live band to do covers of the famous breaks from the 1970s block parties. However, after "Planet Rock", electro-funk (the electronic Roland TR-808 drum machine recreation of the original 1970s breakbeat sound from the now infamous block parties) became the staple production technique between 1982 and 1986 (the invention of the sampler later in the 80s and Eric B. & Rakim's "Eric B. Is President" brought the original 1970s breakbeat sound back to hip-hop, referred to today as the "boom bap" sound). The use of extended percussion breaks led to the development of mixing and scratching techniques. Scratching pioneered by Grand Wizard Theodore in 1975, and the technique was further developed by other prominent DJs, such as Grandmaster Flash. One example is "Adventures on the Wheels of Steel", which was composed entirely by Flash on the turntables.

During the period years of 1984–1987, beatbox was a common thing to rap with someone making a beat with their mouth. Doug E. Fresh and The Human Beat Box made this popular. Doug E. Fresh was with "The Get Fresh Crew", and The Human Beatbox was with "The Fat Boys".

Quincy Jones was an influential figure in hip-hop as a record producer for Mercury Records, and eventually became its vice president, which made him popular in hip-hop culture. He went on to publish Vibe magazine, which became a cornerstone in hip-hop history.

Five Elements of Hip Hop

Hip Hop is a culture that is made up of five elements. One is MCing, this is when you can talk or rap on the microphone and make an impact on the audience. The second element is DJing. This is one of the ways that hip hop started out by a Disc Jockey playing beats from earlier artist. The DJ would stop in the song where the beat was broken down, which was called breakbeats. The third element is Break dancing and this is where the person gets to express their dancing through songs. This is made popular by The Bronx group "The Rock Steady Crew." Some consider break dancing a part of b-boying and b-girling. Next we have graffiti, which is expressed through a form of writing, and it is a way that the letters come together with style. The last one is knowledge, and it goes with the mental side of Hip Hop. This includes the knowledge of self, culture, and style.

== History ==
Old-school hip-hop typically refers to music created around 1980; however, the term may also be applied to music before this with hip-hop styles. "Here Comes the Judge" (1968) by Pigmeat Markham is often referred to as "old-school hip-hop".

== See also ==
- Disco
- Funk
- R&B
- Soul music
- James Brown
- South Bronx
