= Red Hot Rhythm & Blues =

Studio album by Diana Ross
- Released: May 8, 1987
- Recorded: 1986–1987
- Studio: Minot Studios (White Plains, New York); Record Plant and Power Station (New York City, New York); Encore Studios (Burbank, California); Westlake Studios (Los Angeles, California)
- Genre: R&B
- Length: 43:56 (US: 38:11)
- Label: EMI (UK); RCA (US)
- Producer: Tom Dowd; Luther Vandross

Diana Ross chronology
Eaten Alive (1985)	Red Hot Rhythm & Blues (1987)	Workin' Overtime (1989)

Singles from Red Hot Rhythm & Blues
- 1. "Dirty Looks" Released: April 29, 1987; 2. "Tell Me Again" Released: July 18, 1987 (North America); 3. "Shockwaves" Released: July 18, 1987 (Europe/Australia); 4. "Mr. Lee" Released: January 12, 1988 (Europe)

Professional ratings
Review scores
Source	Rating
AllMusic	3/5 stars

Red Hot Rhythm and Blues is the seventeenth studio album by American R&B singer Diana Ross, released on May 8, 1987, by RCA Records and EMI Records. It was Ross' last of six albums released by the label during the decade. It was produced by veteran Atlantic Records producer Tom Dowd with one track contributed by Luther Vandross.

== Overview ==
The album charted in the UK, Germany, the Netherlands and Austria, as well as reaching the Top 20 in Sweden and Norway. It was Ross's final album for RCA Records, after a six-year stint with the label since Why Do Fools Fall in Love (1981). In the US, the album peaked at No. 73 on the Billboard 200.

The album included "Dirty Looks" (US R&B No. 12, UK No. 49), originally recorded by Motown outfit Warp 9, and the retro-flavoured "Shockwaves" which was released as a Shep Pettibone remix in the UK and peaked at No. 76.

A number of major contemporary songwriters contributed new songs to the project including Luther Vandross who also produced "It's Hard for Me to Say" (and later cut the track for his 1996 album Your Secret Love). It also included the first recording of Leonard Cohen's "Summertime" as well as Mick Hucknall's "Shine" (also released on Simply Red's concurrent album Men and Women).

The album also included cover versions of several R&B classics, including the Bobbettes' "Mr. Lee" (UK No. 58), Jackie Ross' "Selfish One", Etta James' "Tell Mama", and the Drifters' "There Goes My Baby".

The album was promoted with a TV special that aired on ABC on May 20, 1987, titled Diana Ross: Red Hot Rhythm and Blues. The special featured guests such as Etta James, Little Richard, Billy Dee Williams, Leslie Nielsen, LL Cool J, Bernadette Peters and Wolfman Jack.

The tracks "Mr. Lee" and "Tell Mama" were not included on the US version of the album and the mix of "Dirty Looks" on the UK version differs from the mix on the US version.

The cover photography was by Herb Ritts.

== Re-release in 2014 ==
The album was remastered and re-released in September 2014 by Funky Town Grooves, as an "Expanded Edition" with bonus material on a second CD. This reissue was licensed from RCA, which owns rights to the album in the U.S. and Canada and is available in these countries (plus, through imports from Solid Records, also in Japan, even when actually Warner Music owns rights here).

== Track listing ==
Side A
No.	Title	Writer(s)	Length
1.	"Dirty Looks" (US Album Mix)	Richard Scher; Lotti Golden	4:09
2.	"Stranger in Paradise"	John Capek; Amy Sky	3:59
3.	"Summertime"	Leonard Cohen; Sharon Robinson	4:05
4.	"Shine"	Mick Hucknall	3:31
5.	"Tell Me Again"	Wintley Phipps	3:14

Side B
No.	Title	Writer(s)	Length
1.	"Selfish One"	Carl Smith; Wilfred McKinley	3:23
2.	"Cross My Heart"	Sharon Robinson	4:11
3.	"There Goes My Baby"	Jerry Leiber; Mike Stoller; George Treadwell; Lover Patterson	3:03
4.	"It's Hard for Me to Say"	Luther Vandross	4:46
5.	"Shockwaves"	Diana Ross; Mark Cawley; Bill Wray	3:49

European Version – Side A
No.	Title	Writer(s)	Length
1.	"Dirty Looks" (European Album Mix)	Richard Scher; Lotti Golden	3:21
2.	"Stranger in Paradise"	John Capek; Amy Sky	3:59
3.	"Shine"	Mick Hucknall	3:31
4.	"Shockwaves"	Diana Ross; Mark Cawley; Bill Wray	3:49
5.	"Selfish One"	Carl Smith; Wilfred McKinley	3:23
6.	"Mr. Lee"	Emma Pought; Jannie Pought; Helen Gather; Laura Webb; Reather Dixon	3:06

European Version – Side B
No.	Title	Writer(s)	Length
1.	"Tell Mama"	Clarence Carter; Marcus Daniel; Wilbur Terrell	3:39
2.	"There Goes My Baby"	Jerry Leiber; Mike Stoller; George Treadwell; Lover Patterson	3:03
3.	"Summertime"	Leonard Cohen; Sharon Robinson	4:05
4.	"Cross My Heart"	Sharon Robinson	4:11
5.	"It's Hard for Me to Say"	Luther Vandross	4:46
6.	"Tell Me Again"	Wintley Phipps	3:14

2014 Expanded Edition CD1
No.	Title	Writer(s)	Length
1.	"Dirty Looks"	Richard Scher; Lotti Golden	4:09
2.	"Stranger in Paradise"	John Capek; Amy Sky	3:59
3.	"Summertime"	Leonard Cohen; Sharon Robinson	4:05
4.	"Shine"	Mick Hucknall	3:31
5.	"Tell Me Again"	Wintley Phipps	3:14
6.	"Selfish One"	Carl Smith; Wilfred McKinley	3:23
7.	"Cross My Heart"	Sharon Robinson	4:11
8.	"There Goes My Baby"	Jerry Leiber; Mike Stoller; George Treadwell; Lover Patterson	3:03
9.	"It's Hard for Me to Say"	Luther Vandross	4:46
10.	"Shockwaves"	Diana Ross; Mark Cawley; Bill Wray	3:49
11.	"Mr. Lee"	Emma Pought; Jannie Pought; Helen Gather; Laura Webb; Reather Dixon	3:06
12.	"Tell Mama"	Clarence Carter; Marcus Daniel; Wilbur Terrell	3:39
13.	"Sweet Soul Music"	Sam Cooke; Arthur Conley; Otis Redding	2:12

2014 Expanded Edition CD2
No.	Title	Length
1.	"Dirty Looks" (12" Mix)	7:49
2.	"Dirty Looks" (12" Instrumental)	5:52
3.	"Dirty Looks" (Bonus Beats)	2:47
4.	"Dirty Looks" (European Album Mix)	3:20
5.	"Shockwaves" (12" Mix)	6:40
6.	"Shockwaves" (12" Instrumental)	3:57
7.	"Shockwaves" (7" Remix)	3:56
8.	"Mr. Lee" (Swing Mix)	6:58
9.	"Mr. Lee" (Rare Groove Version)	6:47
10.	"Mr. Lee" (Swing Mix Edit)	3:10

== Personnel ==
Credits are adapted from the Red Hot Rhythm & Blues liner notes.

Performers

- Diana Ross – lead vocals
- John Capek, Greg Phillinganes, Richard Tee – keyboards
- Steve Goldstein, Jason Miles – synthesizers
- Joseph Joubert – keyboards, arrangements
- Steve Farris, Eric Gale, Jeff Mironov – guitars
- Francisco Centeno, Nathan East, Chuck Rainey – bass guitar
- Steve Ferrone, Steve Gadd, Tommy Vig – drums, percussion
- Ivan Hampden – drums
- Paulinho da Costa, Sammy Figueroa – percussion
- Marc Katz – arrangements
- Paul Riser – arrangements
- Charles Samek – arrangements
- Albert Schoonmaker – arrangements
- John "Skip" Anderson – arrangements (11)
- Jocelyn Brown – backing vocals
- Dennis Collins – backing vocals
- Benny Diggs – backing vocals
- Lani Groves – backing vocals
- Maeretha Stewart – backing vocals
- Darryl Tookes – backing vocals
- Luther Vandross – backing vocals (11)

Production

- Diana Ross – executive producer
- Tom Dowd – producer (1–10, 12)
- Luther Vandross – producer (11)
- Larry Alexander – engineer (1–10, 12)
- Paul Brown – engineer (11)
- Bruce Wildstein – engineer (11)
- Ray Bardani – mixing (11)
- Nick Basich – assistant engineer (1–10, 12)
- Don Rodenback – assistant engineer (1–10, 12)
- Adrian Trujillo – assistant engineer (1–10, 12)
- Ted Jensen – mastering at Sterling Sound (New York City, New York)
- Sephra Herman – musical contractor
- Ria Lewerke – art direction
- Pietro Alfieri – design
- Herb Ritts – photography
- Stylist – Michael Roberts – stylist

== Charts ==
Chart (1987)	Peak position
Canada Top Albums (RPM)	78
Dutch Albums (Album Top 100)	53
European Albums (Music & Media)	34
German Albums (Offizielle Top 100)	55
Italian Albums (Musica e dischi)	21
Norwegian Albums (VG-lista)	20
Swedish Albums (Sverigetopplistan)	12
Swiss Albums (Schweizer Hitparade)	22
UK Albums (OCC)	47
US Billboard 200	73
US Cashbox Top 200 Pop Albums	63
