= Keep On Pushing Love =

Single by Al Green

from the album Your Heart's in Good Hands
- Released: 1994
- Genre: R&B, soul
- Length: 3:59 (7" version)
- Label: RCA, EMI
- Songwriters: Lotti Golden, Tommy Faragher, Arthur Baker, Al Green
- Producers: Arthur Baker, Tommy Faragher

Al Green singles chronology
"Love Is a Beautiful Thing" (1993)	"Keep On Pushing Love" (1994)	"Your Heart's in Good Hands" (1995)

"Keep On Pushing Love" is a song by American R&B/soul singer-songwriter Al Green. It was released as a single in 1994, initially in promotion of Green's 1993 album Don't Look Back, but like previous single "Love Is a Beautiful Thing", was later included on his 1995 album Your Heart's in Good Hands. "Keep On Pushing Love" was produced by Arthur Baker and co-written with Lotti Golden, Al Green and Tommy Faragher. The single invokes "the original, sparse sound of his [Green's] early classics."

== Track listing ==
1. "Keep On Pushing Love" (Joey Negro's Extended 12" Mix)
2. "Keep On Pushing Love" (Joey Negro's Old School Mix)
3. "Keep On Pushing Love" (Absolute Remix)
4. "Keep On Pushing Love" (Joey Negro's Deep Space Mix)

== Charts ==
Chart (1994)	Peak position
UK Club Chart (Music Week)	33
