= Motor-Cycle (album) =

Studio album by Lotti Golden
- Released: May 1969
- Recorded: 1968
- Studio: Sound Center Studios, A&R Studios
- Genre: Rock
- Language: English
- Label: Atlantic
- Producer: Bob Crewe

Lotti Golden chronology
Motor-Cycle (1969)	Lotti Golden (1971)

Motor-Cycle is the debut album by singer-songwriter Lotti Golden, released on Atlantic Records in 1969. The album is memoir of Golden's immersion in the late Sixties counterculture of New York's Lower East Side and East Village, written in music and lyrics because, according to Golden, "a book is too flat." Motor-Cycle describes the dark underbelly of the late Sixties counterculture, "down to the last Seconal capsule."

== Music and lyrics ==
Musically, Motor-Cycle is a synthesis of stream of consciousness, confessional poetry, R&B-infused vocals, and a "sometimes satiric mélange of rock, jazz, blues and soul." Composed by Golden as a memoir recounting her time in New York's East Village, the album describes the underground world of the late '60s with lyrics that evoke "a Kerouac novel." Golden's coming of age saga is considered by some to be the first rock concept album by a female recording artist. On an album of "restlessly epic roadhouse suites," Golden uses the story-based format, featuring a cast of archetypal characters while playing the part of "emcee" of her own "aberrant cabaret."

== Critical reception ==
Newsweek hailed Golden as a new breed of female troubadour—an artist who not only sings but also writes her own songs: "What is common to them — to Joni Mitchell and Lotti Golden, to Laura Nyro, [and] Melanie... are the personalized songs they write, like voyages of self discovery...startling in the impact of their poetry." Motor-Cycle was listed among the most influential albums of the era by music critic Nat Hentoff, who said in 1970, "It's an extraordinary evocation of a life-style... and one girl's plunge into and out of it." Village Voice critic Robert Christgau was less impressed, giving it a "D+" in his consumer guide review of Motor-Cycle [Atlantic, 1969]: "I don't like this myself, but I also don't like Laura Nyro. If you do, you might glance at the lyrics on the back of the jacket."

Motor-Cycle continues to be cited as a groundbreaking album, as in a 2017 piece in The Guardian exploring the impact of contemporary female troubadours on pop music while referencing the seminal female singer-songwriters of the Sixties, like Golden, Joni Mitchell and Laura Nyro, who broke free of what record labels expected of a female artist at the time, paving the way for others. Golden's songs from Motor-Cycle continue to fit comfortably into today's music via samples, such as a sample of Golden's spoken voice from "Gonna Fay's " used by EELS founder Mark Oliver Everett on his MC Honky LP, or on TV shows like "Get Together (With Yourself)" which appeared in the 2022 Disney/Hulu TV miniseries, Pam & Tommy.

In a retrospective review, Path of Tiny Mix Tapes said that Motor-Cycle "plays like a musical, transporting the listener to the late '60s underground," adding: "Golden gets help on Motor-Cycle from an impeccably arranged Atlantic Records session band... with a flawless, swinging rhythm team. Then, at key moments, the curtain goes up and they've got rows of saxes, trumpets, vibes... and you begin to realize that this is not the same song and dance... it's as if The Velvet Underground recorded for Motown."

== Track listing ==
- All songs written by Lotti Golden, except track 5 (Golden/Bob Crewe). Copyright Saturday Music.
1. "Motor-cycle Michael" 8:14
2. "Gonna Fay's" 8:31
3. "A Lot Like Lucifer (Celia Said Long Time Loser)" 6:32
4. "The Space Queens (Silky is Sad)" 7:21
5. "Who Are Your Friends" 5:52
6. "Get Together (With Yourself)" 5:36
7. "You Can Find Him" 5:13

== Re-Issue ==
Motor-Cycle was reissued in March 2025 by boutique label High Moon Records with Warner Bros. Records/Atlantic Records.

Rolling Stone rated Motor-Cycle the Top 5 reissue of 2025.

The reissue package consists of updated mastering, bonus tracks on both the LP and CD, booklets with Golden's story including 30 newly released photos by rock photographer Baron Wolman, liner notes and essays by renowned music critic David Toop, punk legend Richard Hell, and others, offering fresh perspective and critical analysis of the record's relevance and impact. Hell makes clear, Golden doesn't hold back and dubs her "the psychedelic daughter of the Beat generation."

The 2025 reissue continues to garner a new round of reviews and critical commentary. Journalist Michael Azerrad titles his Substack piece on Motor-Cycle "The Sgt. Pepper of the East Village," suggesting the late Sixties were a time when record companies would occasionally support experimentation in rock music and record like Motor-Cycle which presaged the punk scene: "its streetwise poetry and Spectorian rock and r&b reflects the same sensibility that gave rise to the original New York punk community and beyond — hello, Patti Smith and Bruce Springsteen."

Azerrad argues that because Motor-Cycle went out of print soon after its release and history is often written by the winners, our view the Sixties is shaped by the bands we know, for example, the Velvet Underground. Azzerad reminds us that “there were other ways of looking at it, other musicians who documented that community”—like Golden. An example is the Velvet's iconic "Heroin," which portrays a solitary depiction of drug use as compared to Golden's "Gonna Fay's, a communal account of a drug fueled party gone wrong.

Music journalist Jeff Gage wrote of the reissue in Rolling Stone: "Motor-Cycle is at its most audacious when it leans into Golden's episodic storytelling.” Golden makes use of the album format to feature her cinematic narrative. (She told Cosmopolitan magazine after its release that she wrote Motor-Cycle "in music & lyrics because a book is too flat.").

On Motor-Cycle, Golden chronicles her excursions with a coterie of Lower East Side hippie outcasts living party to party. Golden casts herself as a kind of Alice in Wonderland, falling into a bizarro rabbit hole, and spoiler alert, manages to climb out within an inch of her life. Gage, who interviewed Golden for the reissue piece, asks her about this: "As for how caught up she really got, Golden just laughs; ‘it’s gradual. Like watching your hair and nails grow.’”

When Golden presented her songs to producer Bob Crewe, he was taken aback, exclaiming "Good God, who are your friends?" Gage continues, "Golden's friends, it turned out, were a motley band of misfits, underground outcasts who slummed around the East Village and Lower East Side. Drag queens, drug dealers, wannabe artists, and soon-to-be burnouts, all slouching toward Bethlehem."

Gage checked in with Lenny Kaye founding member of the Patti Smith band who describes Motor-Cycle as so outré that it only could have been produced in the Sixties on major label like Atlantic, when recording companies would invest artistic experimentation and innovation supporting artists like Golden.

Additional press on Golden's Motor-Cycle includes articles in The Second Disk, Uncut, That Eric Alper, US Rocker, Bay Area Reporter, Psychedelic Baby, Ugly Things Magazine and more, including an in-depth piece by Charles Donovan in Record Collector interviewing Golden for a six-page feature story titled "Golden: One in a Bullion," with photographs from the Warner/Atlantic archives.
