= Dirty Looks (song) =

Single by Diana Ross

from the album Red Hot Rhythm & Blues
- Released: April 29, 1987
- Genre: R&B, Pop, Soul
- Length: 4:09 (album version); 3:20 (edit/UK album version)
- Label: RCA, EMI
- Songwriters: Lotti Golden; Richard Scher
- Producer: Tom Dowd

Diana Ross singles chronology
"Experience" (1985)	"Dirty Looks" (1987)	"Tell Me Again" (1987)

"Dirty Looks" is a song from the 1987 album Red Hot Rhythm & Blues by Diana Ross. It was written by Lotti Golden and Richard Scher, and produced by Tom Dowd. It was also released as the album's lead single on April 29, 1987, by RCA and EMI. The song, which peaked at #12 on Billboard's Hot R&B Singles, originally appeared on Warp 9's second LP on Motown, Fade in, Fade Out. The European releases of Red Hot Rhythm & Blues features the short version of the song.

The 30th Anniversary (2017) of the 1987 album Red Hot Rhythm & Blues generated new perspectives on the LP: "Despite its fiery title, Red Hot Rhythm & Blues went with a soft, pastel take of Quiet Storm, adult contemporary pop and vintage soul," noting two exceptions: "the urbane percussive funk of the LP's first single “Dirty Looks” (U.S. R&B #12, UK #49) and the tasteful take of Simply Red's guitar soul injected [track] “Shine” Described as "a sexy, mature number that incorporates elements from the burgeoning Hip-hop genre, “Dirty Looks”’ exudes the “glossy soul Diana Ross has perfected over the past two decades. The song was written by Lotti Golden and Richard Scher, who’d first produced the song for their electro Hip-hop group Warp 9 on their 1986 Motown LP..." Further details from Diana Ross: A Biography by J.Randy Taraborellii describes (p. 556) how Ms. Ross found "Dirty Looks" herself, and brought the song to producer, Tom Dowd, who was forced to rethink the LP in order to accommodate the song due to its urban, hip hop values; it wasn't the direction Dowd was planning for the album, but Ross was adamant about recording “Dirty Looks”

== Charts ==
Chart (1987)	Peak position
Canada Top Singles (RPM)	88
Netherlands (Single Top 100)	60
UK Singles (Official Charts)	49
US Hot R&B/Hip-Hop Songs (Billboard)	12
West Germany (GfK)	58
