= Your Heart's in Good Hands =

Studio album by Al Green
- Released: 1995
- Genres: Soul, funk, R&B, pop
- Length: 43:41
- Label: MCA
- Producers: Narada Michael Walden, Arthur Baker, Tommy Faragher, DeVante Swing, Andy Cox, David Steele, Louis Biancaniello

Al Green chronology
Don't Look Back (1993)	Your Heart's in Good Hands (1995)	Anthology (1997)

Your Heart's in Good Hands is American singer Al Green's 26th studio album, his first after a several-year hiatus from secular music, released by MCA Records in 1995. Described as "a solid project that approaches the Rev. Green's classic work with Hi Records", the album was said to capture much of Al Green's early vocal sound, keeping true to his original style but also adding modern elements. "Keep On Pushing Love", a single released from the album, produced by Arthur Baker and co-written with Lotti Golden, Al Green and Tommy Faragher invokes "the original, sparse sound of his [Green's] early classics." "Your Heart's in Good Hands", a single produced by Narada Michael Walden and written by Diane Warren, was also released from the LP.

== Track listing ==
1. "Your Heart's in Good Hands" (Diane Warren) – 6:02
2. "Keep On Pushing Love" (Arthur Baker, Tommy Faragher, Lotti Golden, Al Green) – 5:08
3. "Could This Be The Love" (DeVante Swing) – 3:44
4. "Love Is a Beautiful Thing" (Seth Swirsky) – 5:27
5. "One Love" (Al Green, David Steele) – 3:47
6. "Don't Look Back" (John Lee Hooker, Smokey Robinson, Robert White, Ronnie White) – 4:51
7. "Best Love" (Al Green, David Steele) – 3:39
8. "Your Love (Is More Than I Ever Hoped For)" (Al Green, David Steele) – 5:06
9. "What Does It Take" (Al Green, David Steele) – 4:11
10. "People in the World (Keep On Lovin' You)" (Al Green, David Steele) – 4:09

== Personnel ==
- Al Green – lead vocals
- Louis Biancaniello – keyboards (1), Hammond B3 organ (1), programming (1)
- Tommy Faragher – keyboards (2), programming (2), backing vocals (2)
- Richard Tee – keyboards (2, 4), organ (2, 4), acoustic piano (4)
- DeVante Swing – all instruments (3), arrangements (3)
- Axel Kröll – programming (4, 6), arrangements (6)
- David Steele – keyboards (5, 7–10), guitars (5, 7–10), bass guitar (5, 7–10), arrangements (5, 7–10), congas (9, 10)
- Andy Cox – programming (5, 7–10), guitars (5, 7–10), percussion (5, 9, 10), arrangements (5, 7–10)
- Paul Pesco – guitars (2, 4, 6)
- Doug Wimbish – bass guitar (2, 4)
- Will Lee – bass guitar (6)
- Narada Michael Walden – drums (1), arrangements (1)
- David Palmer – drums (2, 6)
- Bernard Purdie – drums (9)
- Tony Mason – drums (10)
- Bashiri Johnson – percussion (2, 4)
- Roger Rosenberg – baritone saxophone (2)
- Andy Snitzer – tenor saxophone (2)
- Andrew Love – saxophones (5, 7–10)
- Curtis Stigers – saxophone (6), lead vocals (6)
- Michael E. Davis – trombone (2)
- Wayne Jackson – trombone (5, 7–10), trumpet (5, 7–10)
- Chris Scott – trumpet (2)
- Graeme Hamilton – trumpet (10)
- Frank Martin – string arrangements and conductor (1)
- Nathan Rubin – concertmaster (1)
- Nikita Germaine – backing vocals (1)
- Sandy Griffith – backing vocals (1)
- Skyler Jett – backing vocals (1)
- Claytoven Richardson – backing vocals (1)
- Lotti Golden – backing vocals (2)
- Cindy Mizelle – backing vocals (2, 4)
- Nicki Richards – backing vocals (2, 4, 6)
- Kennan Keating – backing vocals (3)
- Paulette McWilliams – backing vocals (4, 6)
- Wincy Terry – backing vocals (5, 7, 8, 10)
- B.J. Nelson – backing vocals (6)
- The Mint Juleps – backing vocals (8, 9, 10)
