= Eaten Alive (song) =

Single by Diana Ross

from the album Eaten Alive
- B-side: "Eaten Alive (Edited Dance Mix)" (US); "I'm Watching You" (UK)
- Released: September 1, 1985
- Recorded: 1985
- Length: 3:55
- Label: RCA (North America); Capitol (world)
- Songwriters: Barry Gibb; Maurice Gibb; Michael Jackson
- Producers: Barry Gibb; Michael Jackson; Karl Richardson; Albhy Galuten

Diana Ross singles chronology
"Missing You" (1984)	"Eaten Alive" (1985)	"Chain Reaction" (1985)

Music video
- "Eaten Alive" on YouTube

"Eaten Alive" is a 1985 song released by American entertainer Diana Ross on the RCA label in North America and Capitol label globally. The song was released as the first single on September 1, 1985, taken from her sixteenth studio album of the same name, which was ultimately a commercial failure in the US. However, it did reach top 10 and top 20 rankings in several European countries such as Norway and the Netherlands.

The song was written by Barry Gibb, Maurice Gibb, and Michael Jackson, the latter also co-producing with Barry and his team. Jackson and Barry Gibb can be heard singing in the background of the song with Jackson at times co-singing lead with Ross. The song was a disappointment in the United States, peaking at No. 77 on the Billboard Hot 100 chart. It became her first lead single to not hit the Top 40 since 1978, although it fared much better on the R&B singles chart - where it reached the Top 10 - helped by BET's heavy rotation of the music video. The song was also a successful hit on the dance chart, peaking at #3.

In the song's original copyright registration from March 11, 1985, it was credited to Barry Gibb and Maurice Gibb. It was not until Michael Jackson heard the song's demo that he suggested the chorus could be improved. The second copyright registration was filed on June 1 (the same day that Diana performed a sold-out concert at Joe Louis Arena in her hometown of Detroit) with the note 'words and music in the choruses have been completely rewritten'.

== Music video ==
The accompanying music video for "Eaten Alive", inspired by The Island of Doctor Moreau, was directed by David Hogan and featured the singer playing a panther woman seducing a man played by Joseph Gian after having been pursued by chimeras.

== Charts ==
Chart (1985)	Peak position
Australia (Kent Music Report)	81
Belgium (Ultratop 50 Flanders)	24
Europe (European Hot 100 Singles)	44
Finland (Suomen virallinen lista)	14
Italy (Musica e dischi)	10
Netherlands (Dutch Top 40)	26
Netherlands (Single Top 100)	17
New Zealand (Recorded Music NZ)	26
Sweden (Sverigetopplistan)	14
Switzerland (Schweizer Hitparade)	17
UK Singles (OCC)	71
US Billboard Hot 100	77
US Dance Club Songs (Billboard)	3
US Hot R&B/Hip-Hop Songs (Billboard)	10
West Germany (GfK)	38
