= Experience (Diana Ross song) =

Single by Diana Ross

from the album Eaten Alive
- Released: April 4, 1986
- Recorded: 1985
- Genre: Pop; soul; R&B
- Length: 4:57
- Label: Capitol
- Songwriters: Barry Gibb; Maurice Gibb; Robin Gibb; Andy Gibb
- Producers: Barry Gibb; Albhy Galuten; Karl Richardson

Diana Ross singles chronology
"Chain Reaction" (1985)	"Experience" (1986)	"Dirty Looks" (1987)

Music video
- "Experience" on YouTube

"Experience" is a song recorded by American singer Diana Ross for her fifteenth studio album Eaten Alive (1985). It was written by Barry, Maurice, Robin and Andy Gibb, while Barry produced the track along with Albhy Galuten and Karl Richardson.

== Chart performance ==
The song was released as the third and final single from the album on April 4, 1986, by Capitol Records, in Europe, Australia and New Zealand, due to the popularity of the previous single "Chain Reaction" in these territories. In the UK, it reached number 47 and spent three weeks on the chart. In the Dutch Single Top 100 chart, the single reached number 45; while on the Dutch Top 40, it reached the Tipparade, peaking at number three during an eight-week chart run. In Ireland, it cracked the top 20 of the chart.

== Music video ==
A music video was shot to promote the song, with Ross herself involved in the production, and such directors as Marcelo Epstein and Kenny Ortega were attracted as consultants. The producer was Chris Mathur from Pendulum Productions. The music video was released in May 1986.

== Track listing ==
7" single
A "Experience" – 4:54
B "Oh Teacher" – 3:37

12" single
A "Experience" (Special Dance Remix) – 5:45
B1 "Experience" (Instrumental) – 4:50
B2 "Experience" (Single Version) – 4:07

12" single
A "Experience" (Special Dance Remix) – 5:45
B1 "Experience" (Instrumental) – 4:50
B2 "Oh Teacher" – 3:37

== Charts ==
Chart performance for "Experience"
Chart (1986)	Peak position
Australia (Kent Music Report)	64
Ireland (IRMA)	14
Luxembourg (Radio Luxembourg)	26
Netherlands (Single Top 100)	45
Netherlands (Tipparade)	3
UK Singles (OCC)	47
