= Nunk (song) =

- 12" Single Cover

Single by Warp 9

from the album It's a Beat Wave
- Released: 1982
- Genre: Electro
- Length: 7:19
- Label: Prism Records
- Songwriter(s): Lotti Golden; Richard Scher
- Producer(s): Golden; Scher

Warp 9 singles chronology
"Nunk" (1982)	"Light Years Away" (1983)

"Nunk" (also known as "Nunk (New Wave Funk)") the first single by the group Warp 9, released on Prism Records in 1982, was written and produced by Lotti Golden and Richard Scher. The song appeared as a vocal and instrumental version on the group's 1983 debut album It's a Beat Wave on Prism Records and 4th & Broadway records in the UK.

New York City radio station WKTU featured "Nunk" in a commercial to promote the station's signature sound of emerging hip hop. By 1982, the electronic (electro) sound had become the trend on the street and in dance clubs largely due to "extraordinary advances in electronic music technology in the late-1970s and early-1980s." Drum machines, especially the Roland TR-808 lowered the cost of record production, providing opportunities for producers to create and experiment with new sounds.

"Nunk" was code for NUNK= N-ew wave + f-UNK. The record was characterized by a robotic chant, syncopated rhythms and arcade-sounding, sci-fi influenced synths from funky keyboard riffs to eerie string lines. "Nunk"'s popularity helped Warp 9 develop a devoted following in the New York metropolitan area, leading to a worldwide deal with Island Records (Prism Records/Island Records in the U.S.) on which their debut LP, It's a Beat Wave and subsequent singles were released. The producers, Lotti Golden and Richard Scher produced dub mixes and instrumental versions of "Nunk" creating club and remix possibilities.
