= Eaten Alive (album) =

Studio album by Diana Ross
- Released: September 24, 1985
- Recorded: 1985
- Studio: Bill Schnee Studios (Hollywood, California); Lion Share Recording and Studio 55 (Los Angeles, California); Middle Ear Studio (Miami, Florida)
- Genre: R&B; pop
- Length: 40:25
- Label: RCA
- Producer: Gibb-Galuten-Richardson; Michael Jackson (co.)

Diana Ross chronology
Swept Away (1984)	Eaten Alive (1985)	Red Hot Rhythm & Blues (1987)

Singles from Eaten Alive
- 1. "Eaten Alive" Released: September 1, 1985; 2. "Chain Reaction" Released: November 28, 1985; 3. "Experience" Released: April 4, 1986

Eaten Alive is the sixteenth studio album by American R&B singer Diana Ross, released on September 24, 1985, by RCA Records in the United States, with EMI Records distributing elsewhere. It was Ross' fifth of six albums released by the label during the decade. Primarily written and produced by Barry Gibb of the Bee Gees, with co-writing from his brothers Andy, Maurice, and Robin, the album also includes a contribution from Ross' friend Michael Jackson who co-wrote and performed (uncredited) on the title track.

Eaten Alive was deemed a commercial failure in the US, where it peaked at No. 45 on the US Billboard 200 and sold around 300,000 copies, spending 20 weeks on the chart. It fared better internationally, entering the top 10 in the Netherlands, Sweden, Norway and Switzerland, whilst reaching number 11 in Australia and the UK. It also made the top 20 in Germany, Italy, Austria and Japan.

Eaten Alive produced the singles "Eaten Alive", "Chain Reaction", and "Experience", the most successful of these being "Chain Reaction", which topped the charts in both the UK and Australia. In his biography of Ross, J. Randy Taraborrelli attributed the album's poor performance in the U.S. to the release of the title track as its first single, rather than one of the other two songs. He noted that "Eaten Alive" was "like nothing else on the record", and with its "incomprehensible" lyrics, "set an unfair tone for the album with record buyers".

== Background ==
Eaten Alive was primarily conceived by Barry Gibb, who had co-written and co-produced successful albums for Barbra Streisand, Dionne Warwick, and Kenny Rogers earlier that decade. Most of the tracks were written by Gibb and at least one of his three brothers, as well as Albhy Galuten and Michael Jackson. "Chain Reaction" was written last to provide the album with an obvious single, and was intended to sound like a Motown song Ross might have recorded with The Supremes (although when first played to her, she rejected it for that reason).

The album was remastered and re-released on September 29, 2014, by Funky Town Grooves, with bonus material on a second CD. This reissue was licensed from RCA, which owns rights to the album in the U.S. and Canada and is available in these countries (plus, through imports from Solid Records, also in Japan, even when actually Warner Music Group owns rights here).

== Critical reception ==
Professional ratings
Review scores
Source	Rating
AllMusic	3/5 stars

In a retrospective review for AllMusic, critic Ron Wynn gave the album three stars out of five and wrote that "Diana Ross got a lot of mileage from this album, although it didn't duplicate the success she'd enjoyed with Swept Away. The title track was a Top Ten R&B hit, thanks in part to Michael Jackson's presence on background vocals, and another single also made the charts. Ross wasn't the powerhouse she was in the 1970s, but she was still doing well enough to keep making records."

== The Eaten Alive Demos ==
The Eaten Alive Demos as sung by Barry Gibb were made available as downloads on iTunes in October 2006. The album contained most of the songs except for the title track and "Chain Reaction". In the spring of 2009, when iTunes changed into DRM-free downloads with higher bit-rates, all of the Barry Gibb demos were no longer available. In August 2011 all of the Barry Gibb demos reappeared on iTunes shortly after the opening of the download store on his official website where many of the same tracks were available. Another demo of the title track by Michael Jackson is known to have been recorded, but, to this date, has not yet surfaced.

== Track listing ==
=== Original release ===
All tracks written by Barry, Robin and Maurice Gibb and produced by Gibb-Galuten-Richardson, except where noted.

Side A
No.	Title	Writer(s)	Producer(s)	Length
1.	"Eaten Alive"	Barry Gibb; Maurice Gibb; Michael Jackson	Gibb-Galuten-Richardson; Jackson^{[a]}	3:54
2.	"Oh Teacher"			3:40
3.	"Experience"	B. Gibb; M. Gibb; R. Gibb; Andy Gibb		4:57
4.	"Chain Reaction"			3:49
5.	"More and More"	B. Gibb; A. Gibb; Albhy Galuten		3:06

Side B
No.	Title	Writer(s)	Length
6.	"I'm Watching You"		3:51
7.	"Love on the Line"		4:21
8.	"(I Love) Being in Love with You"		4:33
9.	"Crime of Passion"		3:34
10.	"Don't Give Up on Each Other"	B. Gibb; George Bitzer	3:45

International CD reissue bonus track
No.	Title	Writer(s)	Producer(s)	Length
11.	"Eaten Alive" (Extended Re-Mix)	B. Gibb; M. Gibb; Jackson	Gibb-Galuten-Richardson; Jackson^{[a]}	5:52

2014 CD reissue (Disc 2) (Funky Town Grooves)
No.	Title	Length
1.	"Eaten Alive" (Single Mix)	3:53
2.	"Eaten Alive" (Single Mix Instrumental)	3:59
3.	"Eaten Alive" (Hot Extended Dance Mix)	5:53
4.	"Eaten Alive" (Hot Extended Dance Mix Instrumental)	5:52
5.	"Experience" (Single Version)	4:06
6.	"Experience" (Instrumental)	4:50
7.	"Experience" (Special Dance Mix)	5:46
8.	"Chain Reaction" (Special Single Mix)	4:21
9.	"Chain Reaction" (Special Dance Mix)	6:55

Notes

- ^{^[a]} signifies a co-producer

== Personnel ==
Credits are adapted from the Eaten Alive liner notes.

Performers

- Diana Ross – lead vocals
- John Barnes – keyboards
- George Bitzer – keyboards, synthesizers, acoustic piano
- Albhy Galuten – synthesizers, arrangements
- James Newton Howard – keyboards, synthesizers
- Greg Phillinganes – keyboards
- Larry Williams – keyboards
- Don Felder – guitars
- Barry Gibb – guitars, backing vocals, arrangements
- George Terry – guitars
- Nathan East – bass
- Steve Gadd – drums
- Paul Leim – drums
- Michael Fisher – percussion
- Kim Hutchcroft – saxophones
- Tom Scott – saxophone
- Bill Reichenbach Jr. (credited as Bill Reichenbach) – trombone
- Gary Grant – trumpet
- Jerry Hey – trumpet
- Michael Jackson – backing vocals on "Eaten Alive"
- Bruce Albertine – backing vocals
- Myrna Matthews – backing vocals
- Marti McCall – backing vocals

Production

- Albhy Galuten – producer
- Barry Gibb – producer
- Karl Richardson – producer, engineer, mixing (8)
- Michael Jackson – co-producer (1)
- Jack Joseph Puig – engineer, mixing (4–6, 10)
- Humberto Gatica – mixing (1, 3)
- Elliot Scheiner – mixing (2, 7, 9)
- Larry Ferguson – assistant engineer
- Dan Garcia – assistant engineer
- Scott Glasel – assistant engineer
- Julie Last – assistant engineer
- François Kevorkian – remixing (11)
- Ron St. Germain – remixing (11)
- Mastered by George Marino – mastering at Sterling Sound (New York City, New York)
- Ria Lewerke – art direction, design
- Diana Ross Enterprises, Inc. – artwork
- Moshe Brakha – photography

== Charts ==
=== Weekly charts ===
Chart (1985)	Peak position
Australian Albums (Kent Music Report)	11
Austrian Albums (Ö3 Austria)	14
Canada Top Albums (RPM)	43
Dutch Albums (Album Top 100)	8
Finnish Albums (Suomen virallinen lista)	27
European Top 100 Albums (Music & Media)	18
German Albums (Offizielle Top 100)	14
Italian Albums (Musica e dischi)	14
Japanese Albums (Oricon)	20
Norwegian Albums (VG-lista)	9
Swedish Albums (Sverigetopplistan)	3
Swiss Albums (Schweizer Hitparade)	10
UK Albums (OCC)	11
US Billboard 200	45
US Top R&B/Hip-Hop Albums (Billboard)	27

=== Year-end charts ===
Chart (1985)	Position
Dutch Albums (Album Top 100)	96
