= Jerry Calliste Jr. =

American entrepreneur and producer

- Also known as: Hashim
- Born: Gerald C. Calliste Jr. November 26, 1965 (age 60); New York City, U.S.
- Genres: Hip hop; electro; funk; pop rap
- Occupations: Entrepreneur and producer
- Years active: 1983–present
- Labels: Cutting
- Website: jerrycallistejr.com

Gerald C. Calliste Jr. (born November 26, 1965), also known as Hashim, is an American entrepreneur, producer, songwriter, publisher, and former DJ who is best known for the hip hop, electro, and dance music song "Al-Naafiysh (The Soul)" (1983).

== Education ==
Calliste attends the Ross School of Management & Leadership at Franklin University, where he is a double major student studying for a Bachelor of Science in Information Technology and a Bachelor of Science in Management Information Sciences.

== History ==
In 1983, Calliste co-founded the New York Independent record label Cutting Records Inc. with two partners and recorded under the name Hashim. At the age of 16, Calliste used a $50 Casio keyboard (combo calculator) to teach himself how to play keyboards by ear. One year later, he went on to write and produce "Al-Naafiysh (The Soul)". During the early 1980s, he "made it to #43 in the Billboards Dance Disco Charts". Since 2001, Calliste Jr. is president and CEO of both Bassmint Music and Caldella Music.

Hashim – "Al-Naafyish (The Soul)" (1983)
Sample of Hashim's "Al-Naafyish (The Soul)" (1983), an influential electro track.

According to Kellman in 2007, Hashim was the work of Jerry Calliste Jr. He became involved with music as a teenager; he started DJ at the age of 12, and in the early 1980s, he promoted parties. His graffiti work on a banner for Tommy Boy Records led to him attaining a part-time gig doing custodial work at that label's offices. Having been raised a Catholic, he converted to Islam in 1982 and adopted Hashim, which means "decisive" in Arabic, as his Muslim name. In 1983, Calliste became Cutting Records's first recording artist and the company's vice president. Calliste eventually left Cutting and continued working as a promoter. He also went on to start Bassmint Music, an online label and shop based in Ohio, United States.

In 2008, Hashim appeared on various artists' music compilations licensed by Global Underground Ltd. and Ministry of Sound. The compilations are mixed by DJs such as Junior Sanchez, Satoshi Tomiie and Benny Benassi. In 2009, Hashim appeared on various artists music compilations licensed by Universal Music and Ninja Tune. On Ninja Tune's "Now, Look and Listen", Hashim's music is featured. Also in 2009, Hashim appeared on Activision Blizzard's popular video game DJ Hero: Renegade Edition. On DJ Hero: Renegade Edition, Hashim is pitted against Daft Punk on the Expert difficulty level. In 2003, he appears on Sony Computer Entertainment's NBA ShootOut 2004 and in 2002, Hashim appears on Grand Theft Auto: Vice City on the game track, soundtrack and TV commercial.

In October 2009, Calliste was co-founder and partner of the technology startup venture Simplestream.us (now Simplestreamtech.com), an infrastructure-as-a-service (IaaS) cloud. Simplestream.us offers MediaDesign, a digital media management system and software-as-a-service cloud.

In 2010 and 2011, respectively, Hashim's "Al-Naafiysh (The Soul)" appears on Catch The Beat: The Best of Soul Underground mixed by Jay Strongman (UK) and three DMC World Champions DJ Qbert, DJ Shiftee and DJ Rafik on Germany's Native Instruments with DJ Qbert's Breakfast of Champions Traktor Pro 2 DJ Gear commercial and software.

== Discography ==
- "Al-Naafiysh (The Soul)" (Cutting, 1983)
- "We're Rocking the Planet" (Cutting, 1984)
- "Primrose Path" (Cutting, 1986)
- "UK Fresh 86' (The Anthem)" (featuring MC Devon) (Streetwave (UK), 1986)
- "I Don't Need Your Love" (featuring Jai Sims) (Precise, 1987)
