= Light Years Away (Warp 9 song) =

- 12" Single Cover

Single by Warp 9

from the album It's A Beat Wave
- Released: 1983
- Genre: Hip hop; electro; dance-pop
- Length: 7:19
- Label: Prism Records
- Songwriter(s): Lotti Golden; Richard Scher

Warp 9 singles chronology
"Nunk" (1982)	"Light Years Away" (1983)	"No Man Is an Island" (1983)

"Light Years Away" is the second single by the hip hop group, Warp 9, released in 1983. Written by Lotti Golden and Richard Scher and produced by Lotti Golden, Richard Scher, and John "Jellybean" Benitez, the song appears on the group's debut album It's a Beat Wave (Prism Records) charting on the Billboard R&B and dance charts.

Described as "the perfect instance of hip hop's contemporary ramifications," Warp 9's second record exemplifies the afrofuturist influence in hip hop, "born of a science fiction revival." The UK media outlet, the Guardian, on May 14, 2014, described "Light Years Away" as a "cornerstone of early 80's beatbox afrofuturism." "Light Years Away" a sci-fi tale of ancient alien visitation, partially inspired by "The Message", also pays homage to Sun Ra's film Space Is the Place. Music journalist Rob Fitzpatrick characterizes "Light Years Away" as a cut above: "this new track was something else, a brilliantly spare and sparse piece of electro hip-hop, LYA traversed inner and outer space, matching rolling congas with vocoder voices and the hiss and sizzle of cutting edge synth and drum machine technology." The rhyme in "Light Years Away" invokes a stark, cyberpunk Philip K. Dickian vision of the future. Newsweek highlighted the song's experimental use of vocoders and sci-fi street imagery in "Language Arts & Disciplines: Sci-Fi Street Sounds."

The 12" recording employed other innovative features for its time, such as incorporating both singing and rapping, a feminist rap by Ada Dyre, live Latin percussion overdubs in combination with Roland TR-808 beats, and a unique take on the snare (backbeat). The snare is syncopated so that the backbeat arrives a 1/16th note early on the second beat of each bar; the fourth beat is not syncopated.
