= Diana, Princess of Wales: Tribute =

Compilation album by Various Artists
- Released: 1 December 1997
- Genre: Various

Professional ratings
Review scores
Source	Rating
AllMusic	3/5 stars
Music Week	5/5 stars

Diana, Princess of Wales: Tribute is a 1997 compilation album released in memory of Diana, Princess of Wales, with participation from a great number of renowned artists. The proceeds from sales of the album went towards the Diana, Princess of Wales Memorial Fund charity created in her memory.

The album, released on 1 December 1997 on double CD and cassette, brings together 36 songs from some of the biggest names in several genres of music, who dedicate both well-known and brand new material to the memory of Diana, Princess of Wales, who had died three months earlier, on 31 August 1997.

The album notably omits Elton John's own tribute song to Diana, "Candle in the Wind 1997", a re-working of his hit song from 1973 (originally about Marilyn Monroe).

== Track list ==
Disc 1

1. "Who Wants to Live Forever" – Queen
2. "You Have Been Loved" – George Michael
3. "Angel" – Annie Lennox
4. "Make Me a Channel of Your Peace" – Sinéad O'Connor
5. "Miss Sarajevo" – Passengers / Luciano Pavarotti
6. "Shakespeare's Sonnet No. 18" – Bryan Ferry
7. "Little Willow" – Paul McCartney
8. "Tears in Heaven" – Eric Clapton
9. "Everybody Hurts" – R.E.M.
10. "Streets of Philadelphia" – Bruce Springsteen
11. "Don't Dream It's Over" – Neil Finn
12. "Hymn to Her" – The Pretenders
13. "Love Minus Zero/No Limit" – Rod Stewart
14. "In the Sun" – Peter Gabriel
15. "Watermark" – Enya
16. "Evergreen (Love Theme from A Star Is Born)" – Barbra Streisand
17. "Every Nation" – Red Hot R+B All Stars
18. "I'll Fly Away" – Aretha Franklin

Disc 2

1. "I'll Be Missing You" – Puff Daddy
2. "Because You Loved Me" – Celine Dion
3. "Gone Too Soon" – Michael Jackson
4. "You Were Loved" – Whitney Houston
5. "You Gotta Be" – Des'ree
6. "Hero" – Mariah Carey (live)
7. "Prayer for the Dying" – Seal
8. "Missing You" – Diana Ross
9. "Wish You Were Here" – Bee Gees
10. "How Could an Angel Break My Heart" – Toni Braxton / Kenny G
11. "Love Is a Beautiful Thing" – Tina Turner
12. "All That Matters" – Cliff Richard
13. "Mama" – Spice Girls
14. "Don't Wanna Lose You" – Gloria Estefan
15. "Stars" – Simply Red
16. "Ave Maria" – Michael Bolton / Plácido Domingo
17. "Pavane" – Lesley Garrett
18. "I Am in Love with the World" – Chicken Shed

== Charts ==
Chart performance for Diana, Princess of Wales: Tribute
Chart (1997)	Peak position
Australian Albums (ARIA)	3
Austrian Albums (Ö3 Austria)	2
Belgian Albums (Ultratop Flanders)	4
Belgian Albums (Ultratop Wallonia)	8
French Albums (SNEP)	13
Scottish Albums (OCC)	2
Swiss Albums (Schweizer Hitparade)	1
UK Compilation Albums (OCC)	1

== Certifications ==
Certifications for Diana, Princess of Wales: Tribute
Region	Certification	Certified units/sales
Australia (ARIA)	2× Platinum	140,000^{^}
Belgium (BRMA)	Platinum	50,000^{*}
Canada (Music Canada)	2× Platinum	200,000^{^}
France (SNEP)	Gold	100,000^{*}
Japan (RIAJ)	Platinum	200,000^{^}
Netherlands (NVPI)	Gold	50,000^{^}
Norway (IFPI Norway)	Gold	25,000^{*}
Poland (ZPAV)	Gold	50,000^{*}
Spain (Promusicae)	Gold	50,000^{^}
Switzerland (IFPI Switzerland)	Platinum	50,000^{^}
United Kingdom (BPI)	2× Platinum	600,000^{*}
Summaries
Europe (IFPI)	Platinum	1,000,000^{*}
^{*} Sales figures based on certification alone.^{^} Shipments figures based on certification alone.
