= Love Is a Beautiful Thing (Al Green song) =

Single by Al Green

from the album Don't Look Back, Your Heart's in Good Hands
- Released: 1993
- Songwriter: Seth Swirsky

Al Green singles chronology
"Leave the Guns at Home" (1991)	"Love Is a Beautiful Thing" (1993)	"Your Heart's in Good Hands" (1995)

"Love Is a Beautiful Thing" is a song written by Seth Swirsky and recorded by American singer-songwriter, pastor and record producer Al Green (at age 46-7) for his 1993 album Don't Look Back. It was released as a single that same year, and was later released on his 1995 album Your Heart's in Good Hands; it also appears on his 2002 L-O-V-E: The Essential Al Green greatest hits collection.

The song was originally written for and recorded by Charles & Eddie on their 1991 debut album, Duophonic. Al Green's version was featured in the films The Pallbearer (1996), Sorority Boys (2002), Two Weeks Notice (2002) and The Cookout (2004). Krystal Harris sang it for the movie Legally Blonde in 2001. Al Green's version was also used as Revlon's theme song in their international ad campaign in 2004.

Through his own ad libs during the song, Al Green acknowledges that "Love Is a Beautiful Thing" summed him up the most: nine seconds into the song Green says "This is what I believe." Then, near the end (at 4 minutes and 43 seconds), over the music he sings the titles of six of his own biggest hit songs: "Let's Stay Together" (which he sings twice), "I'm Still in Love with You", "Call Me", "For the Good Times", "Tired of Being Alone" and "Here I Am".

Tina Turner's version of "Love Is a Beautiful Thing" was included on the 1997 compilation album Diana, Princess of Wales: Tribute.

The song was Brad Pitt and Jennifer Aniston's wedding song.

== Charts ==
Chart (1993)	Peak position
Europe (European Hit Radio)	30
Germany (Official German Charts)	57
UK Singles (OCC)	56
UK Airplay (ERA)	59
