= Electro (music) =

Genre of electronic music

- Other names: Electro-funk; electro-boogie; electro-pop
- Stylistic origins: Electronic; synth-pop; funk; boogie; house; hip hop; chiptune
- Cultural origins: Early 1980s, Japan (Tokyo), U.S. (New York City, Detroit)
- Derivative forms: Miami bass; funk carioca; freestyle; house; techno; breakbeat

Subgenres
- Electrocore; skweee

Fusion genres
- Electroclash; electro house; electro swing; electro hop; electro rock; gqom tech; electrotech

Electro (also known as electro-funk, and sometimes referred to as electro-pop) is a genre of electronic dance music that emerged in the early 1980s. It is defined by the prominent use of the Roland TR-808 drum machine, and draws direct influence from early hip-hop and funk music.

Electro music is typically characterized by synthetic beats, robotic textures, and minimal or electronically processed vocals—often delivered through vocoders or talkboxes. Unlike its boogie predecessor, which emphasized vocal elements, electro focused more on rhythm and machine-generated sound.

The genre arose as the popularity of disco waned in the U.S., blending funk and early hip hop elements with influences from New York's boogie scene and electronic pop from Germany and Japan. Foundational artists in the electro movement include Arthur Baker, Afrika Bambaataa, Warp 9, and Hashim. Pioneering tracks like "Planet Rock" (1982) and "Nunk" (1982) established the genre’s signature sound.

Electro reached peak popularity in the early 1980s. However, the genre began to shift by the mid-decade, incorporating harder beats and rock elements, as seen in the work of groups like Run DMC. After a period of decline, a revival emerged in the late 1990s led by artists such as Anthony Rother and DJs like Dave Clarke. A third wave of interest surfaced around 2007.

Today, electro continues to evolve through numerous subgenres and fusion styles, maintaining its legacy as a foundational pillar of modern electronic dance music.

== Definition and characteristics ==
An electro track example
The beat like that of a Roland TR-808 Synthesizer at 0:04 and the electronically processed vocals at 0:22 are the characteristics of the genre.

From its inception, one of the defining characteristics of the electro sound was the use of drum machines, particularly the Roland TR-808, as the rhythmic basis of the track. As the genre evolved, computers and sampling replaced drum machines in electronic music, and are now used by the majority of electro producers. Although the electro of the 1980s and contemporary electro (electronic dance music) both grew out of the dissolution of disco, they are now different genres.

Classic (1980s) electro drum patterns tend to be electronic emulations of breakbeats with a syncopated kick drum, and usually a snare or clap accenting the backbeat. The difference between electro drumbeats and breakbeats (or breaks) is that electro tends to be more mechanical, while breakbeats tend to have more of a human-like feel, like that of a live drummer. The definition however is somewhat ambiguous in nature due to the various uses of the term.

The Roland TR-808 drum machine was released in 1980, defining early electro with its immediately recognizable sound. Staccato, percussive drumbeats tended to dominate electro, almost exclusively provided by the TR-808. As an inexpensive way of producing a drum sound, the TR-808 caught on quickly with the producers of early electro because of the ability of its bass drum to generate extreme low-frequencies. This aspect of the Roland TR-808 was especially appealing to producers who would test drive their tracks in nightclubs (like NYC's Funhouse), where the bass drum sound was essential for a record's success. Its unique percussion sounds like handclaps, open and closed high-hat, clave and cowbell became integral to the electro sound. A number of popular songs in the early 1980s employed the TR-808, including Marvin Gaye's “Sexual Healing,” Cybotron's “Clear,” and Afrika Bambaataa's “Planet Rock.” The Roland TR-808 has attained iconic status, eventually being used on more hits than any other drum machine. Through the use of samples, the Roland TR-808 remains popular in electro and other genres to the present day.

Other electro instrumentation was generally electronic, favoring analog synthesis, programmed bass lines, sequenced or arpeggiated synthetic riffs, and atonal sound effects all created with synthesizers. Heavy use of effects such as reverbs, delays, chorus or phasers along with eerie synthetic ensemble strings or pad sounds emphasized the science fiction or futuristic themes of classic (1980s) electro, represented in the lyrics and/or music. Electro hip hop group Warp 9's 1983 single, Light Years Away, produced and written by Lotti Golden and Richard Scher, exemplifies the Sci-Fi, afrofuturist aspect of electro, reflected in both the lyrics and instrumentation. The imagery of its lyrical refrain space is the place for the human race pays homage to Sun Ra's 1974 film of the same name, while its synth lines and sound effects are informed by sci-fi, computer games, and cartoons,"born of a science-fiction revival.".

Most electro is instrumental, but a common element is vocals processed through a vocoder. Additionally, speech synthesis may be used to create robotic or mechanical lyrical content, as in the iconic Planet Rock and the automatous chant in the chorus of Nunk by Warp 9. Although primarily instrumental, early electro utilized rap. Male rap dominated the genre, however female rappers are an integral part of the electro tradition, whether featured in a group as in Warp 9 or as solo performers like Roxanne Shante. The lyrical style that emerged along with electro became less popular by the 1990s, as rapping continued to evolve, becoming the domain of hip hop music.

About electro origins:

It was all about stretching the boundaries that had begun to stifle black music, and its influences lay not only with German technopop wizards Kraftwerk, the acknowledged forefathers of pure electro, plus British futurist acts like the Human League and Gary Numan, but also with a number of pioneering black musicians. Major artists like Miles Davis, Sly Stone, Herbie Hancock, Stevie Wonder, legendary producer Norman Whitfield and, of course, George Clinton and his P Funk brigade, would all play their part in shaping this new sound via their innovative use of electronic instruments during the 70s (and as early as the late 60s in Miles Davis’s case).

— Greg Wilson

Gary Numan. Man he was dope. So important to us. When we heard that single, "Are Friends Electric?", it was like the aliens had landed in the Bronx. We were just throwing shapes to this tune, man. More than Kraftwerk. Numan was the inspiration. He's a hero. Without him, there'd be no electro.

— Afrika Bambaataa

== History ==
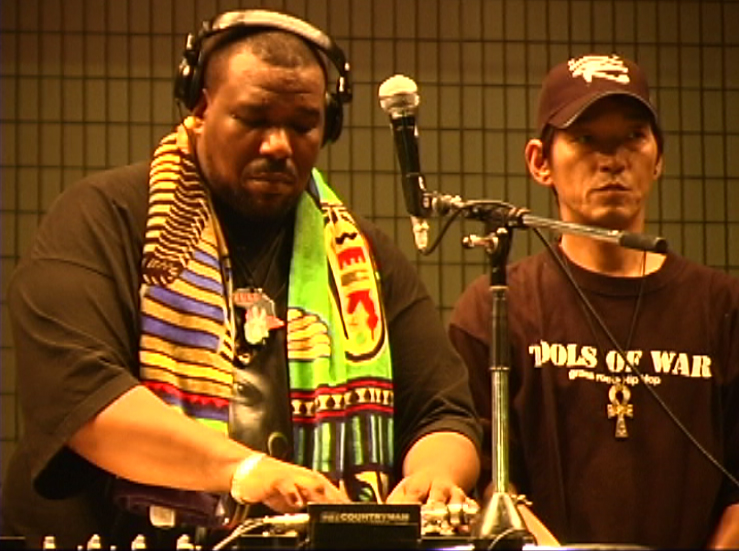
Afrika Bambaataa (left) in 2004

Following the decline of disco music in the late 1970s, various funk artists such as Zapp began experimenting with talk boxes and the use of heavier, more distinctive beats. Boogie played a role during the formative years of electro, notably "Feels Good" by Electra (Emergency – EMDS-6527), the post-disco production "You're the One for Me" by D. Train (Prelude – PRL D 621), and the Eric Matthew/Darryl Payne productions "Thanks to You" by Sinnamon (Becket – BKD 508), and "On A Journey (I Sing The Funk Electric)" by Electrik Funk (Prelude – PRL D 541). Electro eventually emerged as a fusion of different styles, including funk, boogie combined with German and Japanese technopop, in addition to influences from the futurism of Alvin Toffler, martial arts films, and video game music. The genre's immediate forebears included Kraftwerk and Yellow Magic Orchestra (YMO).

In 1980, YMO was the first band to utilize the TR-808 programmable drum machine. That same year, YMO member Ryuichi Sakamoto released "Riot in Lagos", which is regarded as an early example of electro music, and is credited for having anticipated the beats and sounds of electro. The song's influence can be seen in the work of later pioneering electro artists such as Afrika Bambaataa and Mantronix.

Electro experienced a watershed year in 1982. Bronx based producer Afrika Bambaataa released the seminal track "Planet Rock", which contained elements of Kraftwerk's "Trans-Europe Express" (from the album of the same name) and "Numbers" (from Kraftwerk's 1981 Computer World album) combined with the use of distinctive TR-808 beats. "Planet Rock" is widely regarded as a turning point in the electro genre, "like a light being switched on." Another groundbreaking record released that year, Nunk by Warp 9 utilized "imagery drawn from computer games and hip hop slanguage." Although remaining unreleased, a pre-Def Jam Russell Simmons produced Bruce Haack's proto hip-hop single "Party Machine" at a studio in Philadelphia. Electro hip hop releases in 1982 include songs by: Planet Patrol, Warp 9, Man Parrish, George Clinton (Computer Games), Grandmaster Flash and the Furious Five, Tyrone Brunson, The Jonzun Crew and Whodini.

In 1983, Hashim created the influential electro funk tune "Al-Naafiysh (The Soul)" which became Cutting Record's first release in November 1983. At the time Hashim was influenced by Man Parrish's "Hip Hop, Be Bop", Thomas Dolby's "She Blinded Me With Science" and Afrika Bambaataa's "Planet Rock". "Al-Nafyish" was later included in Playgroup's compilation album Kings of Electro (2007), alongside other electro classics such as Sakamoto's "Riot in Lagos". Also in 1983, Herbie Hancock, in collaboration with Grand Mixer D.ST, released the hit single "Rockit".

Bambaataa and groups like Planet Patrol, Jonzun Crew, Mantronix, Newcleus, Warp 9 and Juan Atkins' Detroit-based group Cybotron went on to influence the genres of Detroit techno, ghettotech, breakbeat, drum and bass and electroclash. Early producers in the electro genre (notably Arthur Baker, John Robie and Shep Pettibone) later featured prominently in the Latin Freestyle (or simply "Freestyle") movement, along with Lotti Golden and Richard Scher (the producer/writers of Warp 9) fusing electro, funk, and hip hop with elements of Latin music.

By the late 1980s, the genre evolved into what is known today as new school hip hop. The release of Run DMC's It's Like That (1983) marked a stylistic shift, focusing down on the beats in a stark, metal minimalism. Rock samples replaced synthesizers that had figured so prominently in electro, and rap styles and techniques evolved in tandem, anchoring rap to the changing hip hop culture. Baker, Pettibone, Golden and Scher enjoyed robust careers well into the house era, eluding the "genre trap" to successfully produce mainstream artists.

Throughout the 1990s and early 2000s, Detroit Techno musicians James Stinson and Gerald Donald released numerous EPs, singles and albums of conceptual electro music under several different aliases. Their main project, Drexciya is known for exploration of science fiction and aquatic themes.

Electro music inspired by the electro revival in the UK during the mid 90's is often cited as neo electro, however it is simply a term and not a genre.

== Electro-soul ==
Electro-soul
- Stylistic origins: Electro; soul; hip hop; funk; jazz
- Cultural origins: Early 1980s

Regional scenes
- Detroit; Denver

Other topics
- New jack swing, hip hop soul

In the early 1980s, Detroit techno DJ Eddie Fowlkes shaped a related style called electro-soul, which was characterized by a predominant bass line and a chopped up electro breakbeat contrasted with soulful male vocals. Kurtis Mantronik's electro-soul productions for Joyce Sims presaged new jack swing's combination of hip hop and soul elements. In a 2016 profile on the genre's rise in Denver's music scene, Dylan Owens of The Denver Post writes, "As with all fledgling genres, little about electro-soul is defined — even what to call it. (Of the eight artists interviewed for this article, none agreed on any one name.) But what does seem sure is its rise, especially locally. If Denver can be known as the musical torchbearer of any genre, it's electro-soul's half-live, half-produced swirl of hip-hop, soul, funk and jazz."

"No Self Control" by Peter Gabriel, taken from his 1980 self-titled album, has been described as electro-soul, fused with art rock.

== Contemporary electro ==
Although the early 1980s were electro's heyday in the mainstream, it enjoyed renewed popularity in the late 1990s with artists such as Anthony Rother and DJs such as Dave Clarke. The genre made yet another comeback for a third wave of popularity in 2007. The continued interest in electro, though influenced to a great degree by Florida, Detroit, Miami, Los Angeles and New York styles, has primarily taken hold in Florida and Europe with electro club nights becoming commonplace again. The scene still manages to support hundreds of electro labels, from the disco electro of Clone Records, to the old school b-boy styles of Breakin’ Records and Dominance Electricity, to the electrofunk of Citinite, and to harder more modern styles of electro of labels like Bass Frequency Productions and Nu Illusion Music.

New branches of electro have risen over the last couple of years. Florida has pioneered the "Electrocore" sound, started in the late 1990s by artists like Jackal and Hyde and Dynamix II and carried on to this day. Skweee is a genre which developed in Nordic countries such as Sweden and Finland, hence its first name "Scandinavian Funk". The outlets and artists of Skweee are still mostly limited to the Nordic countries.

Starting in the late 1990s, the term "electro" is also used to refer two other fusion genres of electro, either blended with techno and new wave in electroclash. In 2006, Direct Influence, a six-piece Melbourne based electro/rock/reggae group was formed.

The genre enjoyed a resurgence starting in 2016, with DJs like Helena Hauff and DJ Stingray gaining more popularity and festivals like Dekmantel featuring it prominently on their lineups. Labels like Cultivated Electronics, CPU, Mars Frequency Records, Furatena, brokntoys and Mechatronica are currently pushing a new trove of artists which has introduced the genre to a new generation.
