= Baron Wolman =

American photographer (1937–2020)

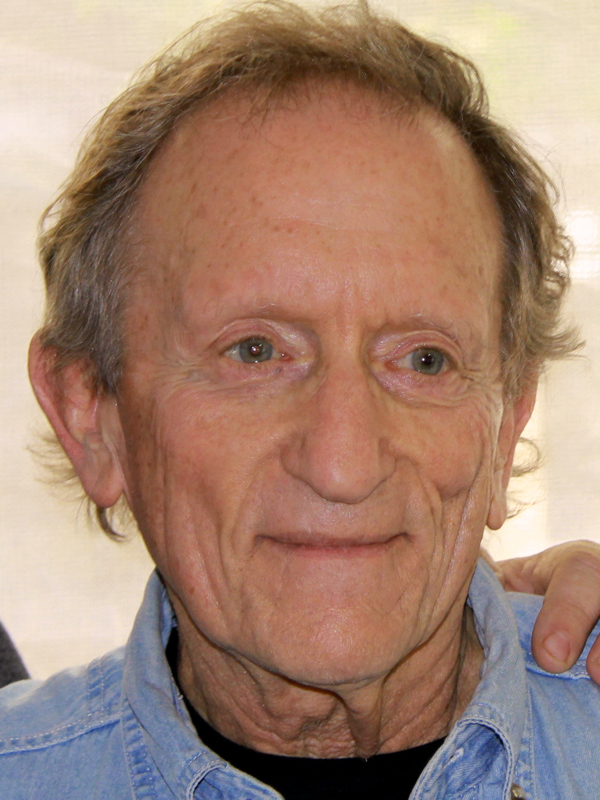
Wolman in 2011

Baron Wolman (June 25, 1937 – November 2, 2020) was an American photographer best known for his work in the late 1960s for the music magazine Rolling Stone, becoming the magazine's first chief photographer from 1967 until late 1970.

== Early career ==
Wolman graduated from Northwestern University, where he studied philosophy.

His professional photographic career began in West Berlin in the 1960s, while stationed with U.S. Army military intelligence. From Berlin he sold his first photographic essay, images of life behind the then-new Berlin Wall. He sold a photo of the building of the wall to the Columbus Dispatch for $50. He decided to become a photo-journalist. After his discharge he moved from Germany to Los Angeles, then to San Francisco, and then to New Mexico.

== Rolling Stone ==
In San Francisco, in April, 1967, Wolman, age 30, met a 21-year-old Cal Berkeley student and freelance writer named Jann Wenner. Wolman had been photographing rock bands, and Wenner had plans to form a new kind of music periodical with San Francisco Chronicle music writer Ralph Gleason. Wolman agreed to join the new periodical, Rolling Stone, and work for free. He also insisted on ownership of all the photographs he took for Rolling Stone, giving the magazine unlimited use of the images. Wolman began working for Rolling Stone from its first issue, and continued for another three years. Because of his virtually unlimited access to his subjects, his photographs of Janis Joplin, the Rolling Stones, Frank Zappa, the Who, Jimi Hendrix, Joan Baez, Iggy Pop, Pink Floyd, Bob Dylan, the Grateful Dead, Phil Spector, Jim Morrison, Ike & Tina Turner, Peter Rowan, and other musicians were the graphic centerpieces of Rolling Stone's layout.

Wolman and friends

For the most part, Wolman eschewed the studio and never used on-camera strobes, preferring informal portraiture, a style appropriate to both the musicians he was documenting as well as the audience for these photographs. Wolman's approach was gradually supplanted by highly stylized, mostly studio image makers, whose photographs were published only upon the approval of the musician and of his or her management. This evolution can be traced on the subsequent covers of Rolling Stone through the years.

== Rags magazine ==
Although his work at Rolling Stone came to define his photographic career, Wolman was also involved in numerous non-music projects. After leaving Rolling Stone in 1970, he started his own fashion magazine, Rags, housed in Rolling Stone's first San Francisco offices. Rags was a counterculture fashion magazine ahead of its time (self-described as "the Rolling Stone of fashion"), focusing on street fashion rather than the fashion found in store windows. Creative and irreverent, the magazine's 13 issues (June 1970 through June 1971) were an artistic although not a financial success.

== Later career ==
Wolman followed Rags by learning to fly and making aerial landscapes from the window of his small Cessna. These photographs were the basis of two books, California From the Air: The Golden Coast (1981), and The Holy Land: Israel From the Air (1987), published by Squarebooks, which Wolman founded in 1974, and which continues to publish an eclectic selection of illustrated books.

In 1974, Wolman spent a year with the Oakland Raiders football team, using his full-access status to photographically document the entire 1974 season. The result was Oakland Raiders: The Good Guys, published in 1975.

In 2001, Wolman moved to Santa Fe, New Mexico, where he continued to photograph and publish.

2011 saw the release of an autobiographical, image-heavy book, Baron Wolman: Every Picture Tells A Story, the Rolling Stone Years, published by Omnibus Press. The book covers Wolman's career from the beginnings of Rolling Stone, and tells the stories behind the photographs.

Wolman was named as a VIP at the 2011 Classic Rock Roll of Honour Awards, where he smashed a camera on stage in homage to Pete Townshend.

== Death ==
Wolman died on November 2, 2020, of complications from ALS, at his home in Santa Fe. He was 83 years old.

In a final post on social media, he wrote, "It's been a great life, with Love being my salvation always."

== Selected publications ==
- The Rolling Stone Years: Every Picture Tells a Story
- Woodstock
- Groupies and Other Electric Ladies
- Classic Rock & Other Rollers
- California From The Air: The Golden Coast
- The Holy Land: Israel From The Air
