= Lotti Golden =

American singer-songwriter

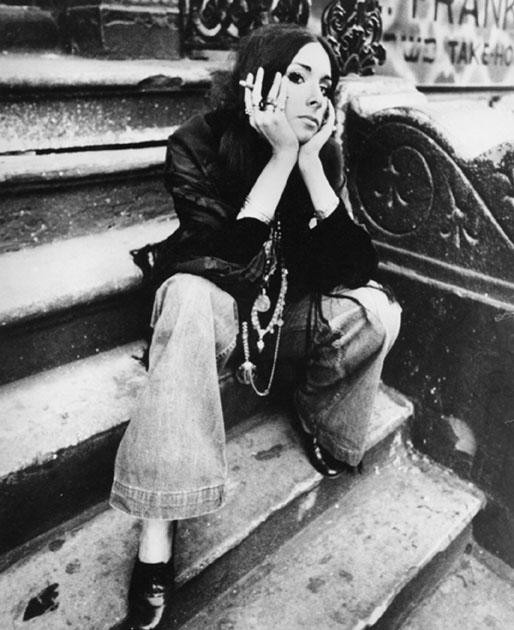
- Lotti Golden, Lower East Side c. 1968

Background information
- Born: Lotti Golden; November 27, 1949 (age 76); New York City
- Origin: New York City
- Genres: Rock; soul; funk; R&B; jazz; electro; hip hop; dance
- Occupations: Singer-songwriter, songwriter, lyricist, record producer/mixer, session singer, poet, writer, artist
- Instruments: Guitar, keyboards, vocals
- Years active: 1967–present
- Labels: Atlantic, GRT
- Website: www.lottigolden.com

Lotti Golden (born November 27, 1949) is an American singer-songwriter, record producer, poet and artist. Golden is best known as an artist for her 1969 debut album Motor-Cycle, on Atlantic Records which was named the #5 Best Reissue of 2025 by Rolling Stone, as well as her prodigious career as a songwriter for other artists in collaboration with Tommy Faragher, Richard Scher, and others.

Winner of the ASCAP Pop Award for songwriting and RIAA-certified Gold and Platinum awards as a writer/producer, Golden has written and produced Top 5 hits in the US and abroad. Credited for her innovative work in early electro and hip hop music, Golden is featured in the Rap Attack 3: African Rap To Global Hip Hop by David Toop, and Signed, Sealed, and Delivered: True Life Stories of Women of Pop for her pioneering work as a female record producer. Golden's songs have been recorded by Grammy Award-winning artists Diana Ross, Celine Dion, Al Green, Patti LaBelle, B. B. King, Patti Austin, Sheena Easton, Helen Reddy, and more.

== Early life ==
=== Childhood ===
Lotti Golden was born in Manhattan to Sy (Seymour) Golden and Anita Golden (née Cohn), the elder of two daughters. Golden's parents, a strikingly handsome and fashionable pair, were avid jazz aficionados and foreign film buffs. Golden soaked up the sounds of Billie Holiday and John Coltrane from an early age developing a lifelong passion for music and the arts.

Golden grew up in Brooklyn, New York where she attended Canarsie High School, serving as the school's Poet Laureate. Voted Most Likely to Succeed, Golden graduated with honors in 1967, winning the Creative Writing medal, the Lincoln Center Student Award for Academic Excellence, the Scholastic Magazine Award for National Achievement in Art, and a New York State Regents Scholarship. Golden was awarded the National League of Pen Women Prize for poetry and went on to attend Brooklyn College.

=== 1964–1968: Early music career ===
A birthday gift (a guitar) from Golden's parents at age eleven would chart her future course. Golden studied classical guitar and voice, but needing more of a creative outlet, soon found her niche as a singer-songwriter, using her abilities as both wordsmith and vocalist. To sing her compositions on demos Golden spent hours using a reel to reel tape recorder to perfect her vocal craft: "When women talk of their idols and influences...they tell stories about singing along with records, trying to emulate someone's voice...until they can begin to develop their own style." Golden explains: "I would practice singing to Aretha, Ray Charles, and the Marvelettes, till I could sing all of their licks and runs... the girls' bathroom in high school was a great place to try it out."

By the age of 14, Golden was making forays into Manhattan, singing on demo sessions and peddling her songs to publishers, eventually signing a contract with publisher Saturday Music as a staff writer and landing her first cover by Patti LaBelle and the Blue Belles. By the time Golden completed high school, she had the beginnings of a musical autobiography about her adventures in New York's East Village and Lower East Side, where she was a resident member of the Henry Street Settlement Playhouse, honing her skills as an actress and playwright. This would become the basis of her Atlantic Records debut LP, Motor-Cycle.

== Recording artist ==
=== 1969: Debut LP: Motor-Cycle ===
Released on Atlantic Records in 1969, Motor-Cycle is a chronicle of Golden's deep dive into the late Sixties counterculture in New York City’s East Village and Lower East Side.

"It was a strange, way out scene for pretty, 19-year-old Golden," who wrote her memoir in music and lyrics because, according to Golden, "a book is too flat." The songs on Motor-Cycle deal with subjects like gender identity ("The Space Queens, Silky is Sad)"), drug use ("Gonna Fay's"), and alienation. So essential was Golden's poetry and lyrics to the project, that a lyric sheet insert was included in the original release package. The back cover of the LP contains Golden’s poem "Night was a Better Blanket," which alludes to the LP's backstory.

Golden was part of a new wave of female singer songwriters who began to shake up the status quo in the late Sixties. Breaking from the confines of pop, they defined themselves by their confessional lyrics, taking on new and controversial subject matter, and most importantly, writing and singing about more than just romantic love. In July 1969, Newsweek ran a feature story, "The Girls: Letting Go": "There has surfaced a new school of talented female troubadours, who not only sing, but write their own songs. What is common to them – to Joni Mitchell and Lotti Golden, to Laura Nyro, Melanie, and to Elyse Weinberg, are the personalized songs they write, like voyages of self-discovery, brimming with keen observation, and startling in the impact of their poetry"

Listed among the most influential albums of the era in The New York Times, "The Best of Rock: A Personal Discography," by music critic Nat Hentoff, Motor-Cycle is a synthesis of stream of consciousness confessional poetry, R&B infused vocals and a "sometimes satiric mélange of rock, jazz, blues and soul" with lyrics that evoke "a Kerouac novel."

On an album of "restlessly epic roadhouse suites" Golden uses the story-based format, featuring a cast of archetypal characters while playing the part of "emcee" of her own "aberrant cabaret." Golden's coming of age saga is likely the first rock concept album by a female recording artist.

Music critic Path, of Tiny Mix Tapes, explains how Motor-Cycle plays like a musical, transporting the listener to the late 1960s underground: "Golden gets help on Motor-Cycle from an impeccably arranged Atlantic Records session band... with a flawless, swinging rhythm team. Then, at key moments, the curtain goes up and they've got rows of saxes, trumpets, vibes...and you begin to realize that this is not the same song and dance... it's as if The Velvet Underground recorded for Motown." Golden writes of a "season in hell " she somehow manages to survive. "It's an extraordinary evocation of a life-style... and one girl's plunge into and out of it."

=== 1968–69: The Making of Motor-Cycle ===
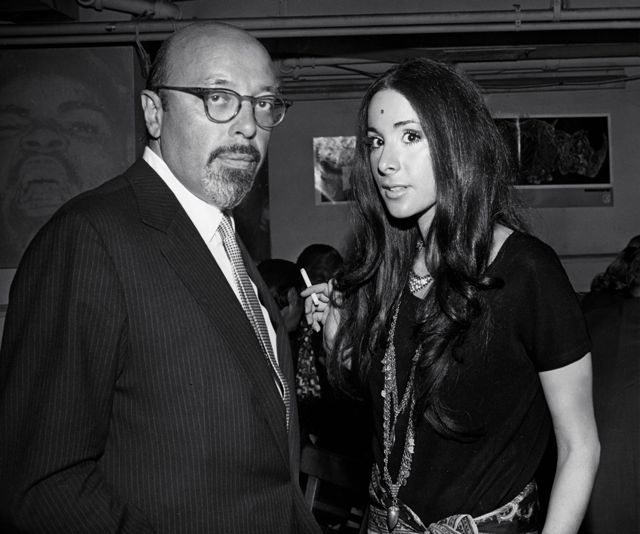
Lotti Golden and Ahmet Ertegun, NYC 1968

Golden signed a publishing deal as a staff writer with Saturday Music during her senior year of high school. One afternoon as Golden was riding the elevator to her demo session, the company's owner, Bob Crewe stepped in while Golden was singing. When Crewe nodded his approval, Golden seized the opportunity, and in one breath told Crewe she was a staff writer at his publishing company and working on material for her own artist album. Intrigued, Crewe set up a meeting: "When Lotti brought her material to Crewe in the fall of 1967, he exclaimed, 'Good God, who are your friends?'" referring to the outrageous characters populating Golden's songs. Crewe was sold on doing the project, but asked Golden if she could wait one year while he cleared his schedule, and in 1968 the pair began recording Golden's autobiographical opus, Motor-Cycle, "a synthesis of funky singing and honest hip lyrics about urban teenage trauma." Atlantic Records moguls, Jerry Wexler and Ahmet Ertegün bought the [demo] tapes after one hearing, with Wexler "modestly telling his staff Golden would be the greatest single pop artist since Aretha Franklin."

The release of Motor-Cycle in 1969 generated considerable media interest in Golden. Look magazine described Golden's songs and poetry as "rich in metaphor and starkly descriptive of people and places," stating: "Even in her musically precocious generation, she [Golden] stands out as a singer composer of phenomenal power and originality." In addition to features in national publications, Lotti Golden was identified by Carrie Donovan of Vogue as a fashion trendsetter, making several appearances in the magazine. Though Golden made no TV appearances, her impact on the contemporary music scene was such that she is referenced in the cultural commentary on television, The Glass Teat. Still, Golden had concerns about the business side of her career, which she voiced in her Look magazine interview: "The easy part is to sit down and create. The hard part is trying to make yourself heard, the promotion."

For reasons that remain unclear today, Atlantic Records suddenly dropped the ball, failing to promote Motor-Cycle. It is curious that none of the songs, (all over five minutes in length), were edited down to the standard 7" format for radio, and no single was released ahead of the LP, a standard Industry practice. Atlantic was going through a major corporate restructuring; its roster was packed in 1969, with Golden's mentors Ahmet Ertegun signing British rock bands, and Jerry Wexler dividing his time between Miami and Muscle Shoals (Dusty Springfield, released on Atlantic that year) moving on.

In the years since its release, Motor-Cycle continues to gain popularity via the Internet, and social media "thanks to the unusual persistence of her [Golden's] art, and the power of listeners' preferences." The LP remains a rich source of samples, with Mark Oliver Everett using Golden's spoken voice from "Gonna Fay's" on his MC Honky project, to the original track from the LP, "Get Together (With Yourself)” appearing on the 2022 Hulu TV miniseries and soundtrack, Pam & Tommy.

=== Motor-Cycle 2025 Reissue ===
Motor-Cycle was reissued In March 2025 by boutique label High Moon Records under the auspices of Warner Music Group/Atlantic Records.

Rolling Stone named Motor-Cycle the #5 Top Reissue of 2025. The lush reissue package consists of updated mastering, vinyl, CD bonus tracks, booklet with Golden's story including newly released photos by rock photographer Baron Wolman, and liner notes by music critic David Toop and punk legend Richard Hell who writes, "Golden's all in, the psychedelic daughter of the Beat generation."

Golden performed two sold out shows at KGB bar in lower Manhattan in celebration of the reissue, reworking songs from Motor-Cycle with singer songwriter Luke Schwartz who served as musical director and guitarist for both performanes.

The reissue garnered a new round of reviews and critical commentary. Journalist Michael Azerrad in his Substack piece sums up Motor-Cycle as Golden's musical memoir, an "18-month sojourn in the East Village, then the darkling epicenter of the New York underground," while his title, "The Sgt. Pepper of the East Village," suggests the late 1960s was a time when the record industry supported experimentation in rock music: "The record's streetwise poetry and Spectorian rock and r&b reflects the same sensibility that gave rise to the original New York punk community and beyond — hello, Patti Smith and Bruce Springsteen."

But because Motor-Cycle went out of print soon after its release and because Azerrad suggests that history is most often written by the winners, our view of that time and place is shaped by the bands we know, like the Velvet Underground, but he argues, "there were other ways of looking at it, other musicians who documented that community,"—like Golden.

Music journalist Jeff Gage writes in Rolling Stone: "Motor-Cycle is at its most audacious when it leans into Golden's episodic storytelling.” Golden makes use of the album format to feature her cinematic narrative. (She even told Cosmopolitan magazine in an interview after its release that she wrote "in music & lyrics because a book is too flat.").

On Motor-Cycle, Golden chronicles her excursions with a coterie of Lower East Side hippie outcasts living from party to party, casting herself as a kind of Alice in Wonderland character who falls into a bizarro rabbit hole, and spoiler alert, she manages to climb out within an inch of her life. Gage, who interviewed Golden for the reissue piece, asked Golden how deep she really got into the scene and writes: "As for how caught up [in it] she got, Golden just laughs. "It's gradual. Like watching your hair and nails grow,” she says..."

Nat Hentoff who wrote about Golden for Cosmopolitan after Motor-Cycle‘s release in ‘69, references her “season in hell” as “one girl’s plunge in and out of it “ but whether or not Golden will ever reveal the full extent of her involvement is anyone’s guess.

Gage continues, "Golden's friends, it turned out, were a motley band of misfits, underground outcasts who slummed around the East Village and Lower East Side. Drag queens, drug dealers, wannabe artists, and soon-to-be burnouts, all slouching toward Bethlehem," referencing Joan Didion's iconic depictions of the West Coast Sixties Counterculture as a kind of counterpart to Golden's East Coast story.

While working on the article, Gage checked in with Lenny Kaye founding member of the Patti Smith band who describes Motor-Cycle as so outré that it only could have been produced in the Sixties on major label like Atlantic, when recording companies would invest artistic experimentation and innovation supporting artists like Golden, echoing Azerrad's thoughts about how a record as out of the mainstream as Motor-Cycle could have been supported by a record company.

Additional press on Golden's Motor-Cycle includes articles in The Second Disk,Uncut, That Eric Alper, US Rocker, Bay Area Reporter, Psychedelic Baby, Ugly Things Magazine and more, including an in-depth piece by Charles Donovan of Record Collector interviewing Golden for a six-page feature story titled "Lotti Golden; One in a Bullion," with photographs from the Warner/Atlantic archives.

== Track listings ==
Side one
No.	Title	Writer(s)	Length
1.	"Motor-Cycle Michael"	Lotti Golden	8:14
2.	"Gonna Fay's"	Golden	8:31
3.	"A Lot Like Lucifer (Celia Said Long Time Loser)"	Golden	6:32

Side two
No.	Title	Writer(s)	Length
4.	"The Space Queens (Silky Is Sad)"	Golden	7:21
5.	"Who Are Your Friends"	Golden, Bob Crewe	5:52
6.	"Get Together (With Yourself)"	Golden	5:38
7.	"You Can Find Him"	Golden	5:13

=== Motor-Cycle samples ===
2003: Golden's spoken voice on "Gonna Fay's" (Motor-Cycle) is the centerpiece for "What a Bringdown" on I Am the Messiah (Spin-ART) by MC Honky, "widely considered to be Mark Oliver Everett (or "E") of the rock band Eels." 2006: Golden's African (Olatunji) -inspired drumbeat on "Motor-Cycle Michael" (Motor-Cycle) appears on Beat Konducta Vol 1–2 Movie Scenes (Stones Throw Records) on the track "Gold Jungle (Tribe)" by hip-hop artist Madlib.

=== 1970s ===
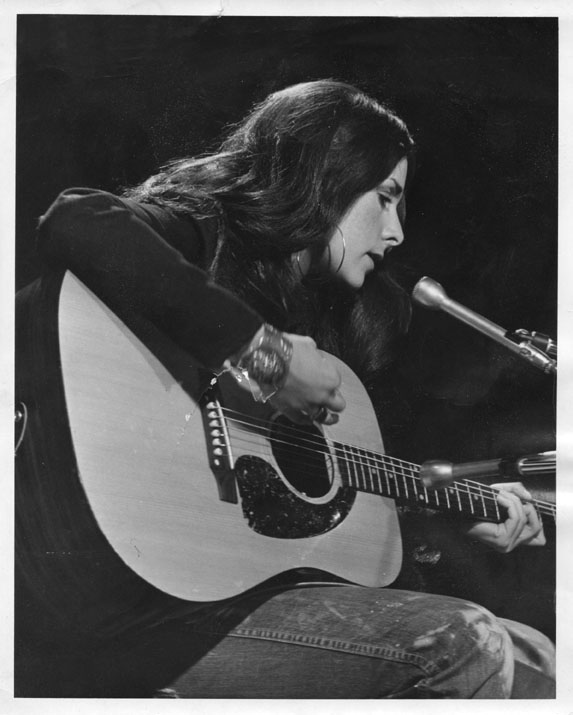
Lotti Golden in 1971

Lotti Golden's eponymous sophomore offering was released on GRT Records (U.S. Label) in 1971. In a live performance for industry executives at NYC's Playboy Club, Golden was described by Cashbox as "GRT's Lotti: Incredible." Although elements of Golden's confessional approach remained (Billboard labeled one song "biographical") for the most part, Golden's self-titled LP moved away from the innovative format of Motor-Cycle. Writer Mitchell Shannon characterizes the shift: "Second time around, her music was more conventional and approachable, but lacked that initial compelling insistence of the previous release." Music critic, Robert Christgau, though not a fan of Golden (or Laura Nyro) thought the GRT record could take off with the proper promotion: "He [Christgau] wrote: 'Golden's egregious overstatement registers as a strength.' If you know about Christgau, you'll take that as an honest compliment." Shortly after Golden's album was released, financial problems caused the GRT label to go out of business.

== Music journalism ==
In the 1970s, Lotti Golden wrote rock journalism, primarily covering her musician friends. In a Crawdaddy! feature story Golden provides unique perspective on the genius of Mike (Michael) Bloomfield chronicling her 1972 San Francisco visit with the legendary guitar player and in Rolling Stone, Golden explores the making of keyboardist (and co-founder with Bloomfied of Electric Flag) Barry Goldberg's first solo LP. Golden's articles have appeared in Creem, Circus and other publications.

== Writer/producer ==
=== 1980–85: Electro/hip hop ===
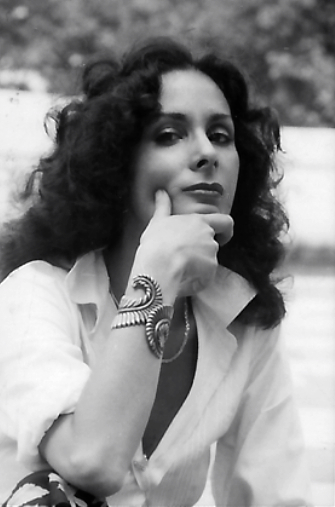
Golden in 1981

In the early 1980s, Golden transitioned from artist to writer/producer. Golden's 1982 international dance hit "I Specialize in Love" co-written with musician Richard Scher, enabled her to move into record production: "The success gave [Golden] the freedom to demand production rights to her songs." In an interview for the anthology, Signed, Sealed and Delivered-True Life Stories of Women in Pop, Golden stated that performing live was OK, but she preferred the recording studio, "that wonderful world of sound [where] anything was possible."

As a writer/producer, Golden gained artistic control of her work, becoming a major progenitor of electro and early hip hop. UK music historian Kevin Pearce describes Golden's transition from artist to producer: "I can still remember the delight at reading [David] Toop's "Rap Attack" and realizing that the Lotti Golden involved as part of electro pioneers Warp 9 in the early 1980s was the same Lotti Golden recording for Atlantic in 1969... with Bob Crewe producing the fantastic Motor-Cycle, one of the greatest and criminally rarest records ever". Golden, with co-writer/producer Scher, wrote and recorded under the moniker Warp 9, a studio production project at the forefront of the electro movement, to which they eventually added live personnel. Warp 9's electro classics “Nunk” (1982) and “Light Years Away” (1983), a tale of ancient astronaut visitation, characterize the sci-fi, afrofuturist aspect of electro. Described as "the perfect instance of hip hop's contemporary ramifications," Golden and Scher worked "real emotion and intelligence into the world of experimental hip-hop and electro." Their records are ranked among the most iconic of the electro hip hop era. Among the early production teams using the Roland TR-808 drum machine, Golden and Scher created a brand of "electo hip hop records with gorgeous textures and multiple layers." Newsweek's "Language Arts & Disciplines" highlighted Warp 9's experimental use of vocoders in “Light Years Away.” The Guardian (May 2014) characterized Light Years Away as " a cornerstone of early 1980s beatbox afrofuturism, inspired by Grandmaster's Flash's The Message, a brilliantly spare and sparse piece of electro hip-hop traversing inner and outer space." DJ Greg Wilson, the first to embrace electro in the UK, calculates the genre's influence on art and culture as "huge," ushering in the computer age, hip hop, and generating "a whole new approach to popular music."

Warp 9's hits brought Golden to the attention of Island Record's chief Chris Blackwell, resulting in a worldwide publishing deal with Island Music. Golden (with Scher) went on to write for, produce and/or remix artists including Diana Ross' hit single "Dirty Looks" from her Red Hot Rhythm & Blues album and TV Special, Patti Austin, Jennifer Holliday (Say You Love Me), The Manhattans, Brenda K. Starr (I Want Your Love featuring guest rapper Adam Yauch of the Beastie Boys), Nina Hagen and Jimmy Cliff.

During the early 1980s Golden began a longstanding collaborative relationship with producer Arthur Baker, co-writing the Latin Freestyle music classic "Pickin' Up Pieces" by Brenda K Starr and co-producing Jennifer Holliday's Billboard Hot 100 hit, "Hard Times For Lovers" (Geffen). Golden contributed background vocals/arrangements for many of Baker's projects including the Goon Squad's "Eight Arms to Hold You," featured on The Goonies: Original Motion Picture Soundtrack. Golden worked with Baker on Artists United Against Apartheid, Sun City, and is among the sixty-one artists (including Lou Reed, Bono, Grandmaster Melle Mel, Keith Richards, Bob Dylan, and Gil Scott Heron) who participated in what rock critic Dave Marsh describes as "the most diverse line up of popular musicians ever assembled for a single session." Golden appears in the video.

=== 1985–89 ===
Lotti Golden relocated to Los Angeles in 1985 establishing herself in LA's burgeoning songwriting scene, signing a worldwide publishing deal with MCA Music (later renewing and extending her contract with David Renzer, Chairman/CEO of the Universal Music Publishing Group). In 1986, MCA Creative Director Carol Ware introduced Golden to writer/producer Tommy Faragher, "on a hunch that the two young writer/producers would click as a team." The pair quickly gained a reputation for "richly produced, finely crafted urban dance music." By 1987 Golden was working almost exclusively with Faragher, telling Cashbox: "We have a gold record [The Jets] our first year working together." Golden returned to New York's Upper West Side with Faragher, building a state-of-the-art recording studio, "decorated with archival black and white photos of John Coltrane, Billie Holiday, [and] Lester Young, souvenirs from Lotti's jazz-fan parents."

On Valentine's Day, 1988, Golden and Faragher were featured in the Business Section of the New York Daily News. The article disclosed the pair feared romantic involvement would ruin their working relationship, but they took the chance, got married and formed their own production operation. The production on their own material was "so good they were invited in to produce tracks they didn't write," which included the R&B Pop group the Jets' album Magic on MCA (1987), certified RIAA Platinum, followed by Brenda K. Starr, certified RIAA Gold, yielding the single "You Should Be Loving Me," which appeared on the soundtrack and film She's Out of Control. In 1988, Golden and Faragher were enlisted by A&M to write and produce EG Daily's sophomore effort Lace Around the Wound (1989), featuring the single "Some People." Although the album never got the promotional push it deserved, several songs were later covered by Celine Dion and appeared on the hit TV show California Dreams.

The real breakthrough for Golden in her partnership with Faragher came in 1989, when producer Arthur Baker phoned, announcing that Clive Davis was looking for a hit single to launch Taylor Dayne's sophomore LP. By the time Baker arrived, Golden had a working chord progression and title. The three completed the song in one session and Baker left with the demo in his pocket, vocals by Golden, resulting in the Top-5 Billboard Hot 100 hit "With Every Beat of My Heart," the lead single from Dayne's Certified RIAA 3× Platinum Can't Fight Fate (Arista) album.

=== 1990s ===
Lotti Golden was honored with the ASCAP Pop Award for "With Every Beat of My Heart" in 1991. Golden's "If You Lean on Me," was recorded by Canadian artist Colin James Sudden Stop LP and featured in the 1991 action film, Run. Golden and Faragher's work with the O'Jays, fused urban R&B with their classic soul sound, coming "closest to accomplishing that fusion with the smoking, politically charged "Something For Nothing." The album won the O'Jays their first American Music Award in 1991. Dubbed "luminous tunesmiths and veteran popsters" in Billboard, the team's 1993 international hit for Jeremy Jordan, The Right Kind of Love (Giant Records) co-produced with Robbie Nevil (Billboard Top 15) featured on Fox's hit TV series Beverly Hills, 90210 (listed by Entertainment Weekly at No. 20 of the top TV shows of the past 25 years) also appeared on the Beverly Hills 90210: The Soundtrack.

Golden and Faragher made music history in 1993, producing the British R&B girl band Eternal, the first female group to reach one million units (album sales) in the UK. Eternal's debut LP, Always & Forever (EMI), certified 4× Platinum by BPI paved the way for other female UK groups like All Saints and the Spice Girls. Golden's experience as a vocalist helped shape Eternal's vocal sound on the four songs she co-produced and wrote with Faragher, including the international hit single "Oh Baby I...", which topped the UK Singles Chart at No. 4. The first UK girl group with six singles to reach the Top 15 on the UK charts from their debut LP, Eternal went on to become one of Britain's most successful girl groups achieving both international and domestic success.

In 1994, Golden co-wrote Keep on Pushing Love for veteran soul singer Al Green. The four way collaboration (Golden, Green, Baker & Faragher) resulted in "one of [Green's] finest recent releases." The single appears on Green's 1995 LP, Your Heart's in Good Hands, "a solid project that approaches the Rev. Green's classic work with Hi Records." In 1993 and 1994, Golden and Faragher reached No. 1 on Billboard's Jazz Charts, with Soul Embrace by Richard Elliot and Diane Schuur's Heart To Heart album, (GRP) featuring "Freedom" performed by B.B. King.

Throughout the 1990s Golden and Faragher continued to write and produce international hits that appeared on the UK Singles Chart and UK Albums Chart for artists including Dana Dawson the group Montage and Arthur Baker. In 1998, Golden & Faragher introduced UK R&B artist Hinda Hicks with the Top 25 hit, "If You Want Me" propelling her debut album, Hinda (Island Records) to No. 20 on the UK Albums Chart, winning two 1999 Brit Awards nominations.

Golden's partnership with Faragher continued for over a decade. An interview in the "Music Connection" provides insight into the collaborative methodology that made the pair a successful team: "I get involved in a lot of technical things, working out the arrangement and stuff like that," Faragher states, "[and] Lotti works on the complete feeling." Describing how songwriters can sometimes get too close to their work, becoming unwilling to modify or delete sections, Faragher pointed out, it was Golden, the iconoclast, who was willing to scrap work she felt wasn't up to par: "I might be attached to a certain section we worked so hard getting, and Lotti would say, 'Maybe we should throw this part out.' I go, 'Oh, no, you're kidding. I'm shocked-[but] she's right. She's absolutely right."' By the close of the decade, Golden's professional partnership with Faragher ended in divorce; they have one child.

In 2000, Golden's "I Should've Never Let You Go" co-written with Faragher, was the second hit single from the Australian girl group Bardot's No. 1 debut album, Bardot, certified 2× Platinum by ARIA, from the Popstars reality TV show. Golden continued working into the early 2000s, but because her recording studio was lost in the divorce process, she could no longer artistically justify writing songs without creative control. The "Music Connection" interview, appearing over ten years before the partnership break-up, reveals just how important the production aspect of songwriting had become for Golden: "Golden & Faragher's pursuit of songwriting and production seems eons beyond the days of a cluttered Brill Building office with an upright piano. What environment does a songwriter need today? Golden: 'This one.' (She gestures towards the conglomeration of keyboards, computers and recording equipment)."

== Literacy advocacy ==
In collaboration with the 92nd Street Y's Educational Outreach Program, Golden designed a songwriting workshop for the advancement of literacy, engaging New York City public school children in the art and craft of songwriting. The classroom based program, "Lyrics & Literacy/Words are Power" was created by Golden in accordance with the New York State Learning Standards for the Arts and implemented in East Harlem by Golden and the 92nd St. Y.

=== 2010–2015 ===
The Rolling Stone Years, a 2011 memoir by rock photographer Baron Wolman featured a previously unreleased portrait of Golden. In the book, Wolman recalls first hearing about Golden from Ahmet Ertegun and Jann Wenner; the trio routinely hit the New York clubs, scouting new talent, (see photo "The Making of Motor-Cycle, 1968-9"). A review of Wolman's book in The Wire, references Golden's previously unpublished portrait: "You'll have your own personal favorites...but [Wolman's] portrait of Lotti Golden, an artist who is unknown to me, appears interesting, intriguing, and important because of Wolman's great photograph."

On Record Store Day, April 16, 2016, High Moon Records reissued the original Atlantic 7" single that followed Motor-Cycle (with the participation of Warner Bros. Records and Rhino Records). The reissue is a remastered version of a medley of the Isley Brothers song It's Your Thing and "Sock It to Me Baby". The Atlantic release of Golden performing a cover in 1969 was certainly an unusual way to introduce an artist who writes all her own material, with no single release ahead of the LP. On the B-side, is a girl-group inspired song written by Golden, "Annabelle With Bells (Home Made Girl)," a "gem that sounds like the Ronettes for the hippie generation." The reissue contains a picture sleeve with new cover art, a previously unreleased photo of Golden, and remastered audio. "Annabelle With Bells (Home Made Girl)," was not included in the 1969 album, due to time constraints in pre-digital recording

== Motor-Cycle Reissue 2025 ==
Motor-Cycle was reissued In March 2025 by boutique label High Moon Records under the auspices of Warner Music Group/Atlantic Records. and was named by Rolling Stone as the #5 Top Reissue of 2025.

The reissue package consists of updated mastering, bonus tracks, a booklet with Golden’s story, newly released photos by rock photographer Baron Wolman and liner notes by music critic David Toop and punk legend Richard Hell, who writes, "Golden's all in, the psychedelic daughter of the Beat generation."

Golden performed two sold out shows at KGB bar in lower Manhattan in celebration of the reissue, reworking songs from Motor-Cycle with singer songwriter Luke Schwartz who served as musical director and guitarist for both performances.

In a detailed interview in Rolling Stone by music journalist Jeff Gage, "A Counterculture Oddity is Finally Getting its Due," Golden reveals previously undisclosed details about her deep dive into the seedier side of New York City's counterculture in the late Sixties.

Journalist Michael Azerrad's Substack piece on the Motor-Cycle reissue points out that Golden's "…sojourn in the East Village, then the darkling epicenter of the New York underground,” with its urban poetry "and Spectorian rock and r&b” was born of the same zeitgeist "that gave rise to the original New York punk community and beyond…hello, Patti Smith and Bruce Springsteen."

[For a more detailed look at the album’s reissue, see the 2025 reissue section under the Recording Artist heading.]
