= Prism Records =

American record label

- Parent company: Unidisc Records
- Founded: 1978
- Status: Defunct (folded into Cold Chillin' Records in 1989)
- Genre: Various
- Country of origin: United States
- Location: New York City

Prism Records was an American record label formed in 1978 by Len Fichtelberg (1930–November 4, 2010). It was originally an independent label, focusing on the New York City R&B and disco scene of the day with groups like Erotic Drum Band and disco dance legends Lime. When Cold Chillin' Records was formed in 1986, it was initially distributed by Prism, but label head Tyrone Williams and Fichtelberg decided to merge their companies. As a result, in 1989, the Prism name was phased out in favor of the new name. In 1987, Cold Chillin' signed a 5-year distribution deal with Warner Bros. Records. The first two Cold Chillin' releases through Warner Bros. (which, incidentally, were the second and third overall Cold Chillin' albums to be released) had the legend A Prism Records Production written on them.

As Warner Bros. Records' premier hip-hop-based subsidiary label, Cold Chillin' released many classic records in the late 1980s and early 1990s from such notable acts as Big Daddy Kane, Biz Markie, Warp 9, Kool G. Rap, GZA, Roxanne Shanté, Marley Marl, and the one-time featured on Prism Records artist Glamorous (Jo Ann Berry), with her singles "Good to Go" and "I Know You Want Me." She was also featured on the singles "Juice Crew All-Stars" and "Evolution" produced by Marley Marl released on Cold Chillin' Records in 1987.

As the 1990s progressed though, the label began to flounder. Its deal with Warner Bros. ended, and it began having its records released through Epic Records. Cold Chillin', however, continued to lose steam, and folded in 1998. Today the namesake is still used on its reissues and the catalog and trademark, save for the recordings of Big Daddy Kane and Kool G. Rap's 4,5,6, are now owned by LandSpeed Records, a division of Traffic Entertainment Group. The rights of the Prism catalogue, however, were acquired by Canada-based independent label Unidisc Records.

There is no connection between the Prism Records of this article and the Prism Records bootleg CD manufacturer of 1994–1998 that was known for Dream Theater and Rush releases.
