= Warp 9 =

American hip-hop group

Background information
- Origin: New York City, New York U.S.
- Genres: Electro, boogie
- Years active: 1982–1986
- Labels: Prism (US); Island (UK); Motown/MCA Records (US); Prism Records; Unidisc; Arista (US); Fourth and Broadway/Island (UK)
- Members: Lotti Golden; Richard Scher
- Past members: Milton Brown; Chuck Wansley; Ada Dyer; Carolyn Harding; Kathrine Joyce

Warp 9, an American sci-fi-themed electro-funk hip hop group, is best known for its ground breaking, influential singles including "Nunk," "Light Years Away," and "Beat Wave," which ranked among the most iconic groups of the electro hip hop era. Described as the "perfect instance of hip hop's contemporary ramifications," Warp 9 was the brainchild of writer-producers Lotti Golden and Richard Scher. The duo wrote and recorded under the moniker Warp 9, a production project at the forefront of the electro movement.

== Background ==
Lotti Golden and Richard Scher were among the early electro production teams in New York City, utilizing the Roland TR-808 drum machine and the casio keyboard, which built its brand of electro by layering multiple keyboard textures over drum-machine tracks, which became Warp 9's signature sound. Although the sound of the Roland TR-808 was the basis for Warp 9's rhythm tracks, Golden and Scher began to introduce live percussion in Warp 9 recordings. For example, on Warp 9's second single, Light Years Away, the Roland TR-808 beats were offset by conga drums." Golden and Scher used both male and female hip hop rhymes combined with solo and group vocals, an innovative approach in early electro hip hop. The Guardian's writer Rob Fitzpatrick describes "Light Years Away": "This new track was something else, a brilliantly spare and sparse piece of electro hip-hop, LYA traversed inner and outer space, matching rolling congas with vocoder voices and the hiss and sizzle of cutting edge synth and drum machine technology."

Scher played all of the instruments on the Warp 9 recordings, with the exception of occasional overdubs such as congas and/or other percussion. Both Golden & Scher worked out the arrangements together, with Golden contributing to the background vocals along with the group. In preparation for the lead vocals, Golden would sing the guide vocals which were replaced by Warp 9 members on the final recordings. One exception is "Master of the Mix" (from It's a Beat Wave), in which all of the female background vocals were performed by Golden (with the rhymes by Boe Brown). In addition to the vocal versions of Warp 9's records, Golden and Scher, influenced by Jamaican Dancehall music, were committed to providing instrumental and dub mixes of every 12", with stripped down beats and breakdowns. The lyrics to the aforementioned 12", "Master of the Mix," can be considered autobiographical, in that they provide (humorous) insight into the duo's philosophy of production and mixing techniques.

== Overview ==
Warp 9 evolved from a studio concept into a band when Prism Records expressed interest in releasing Nunk as a single. Golden & Scher invited drummer Chuck Wansley and percussionist Boe Brown to perform the male vocals and rhymes. Later, a female vocalist was added to the group; Ada Dyer performed vocals and rhymes for Warp 9's second single, "Light Years Away." The group released two albums, It's a Beat Wave (1983), (Island Records), a street themed testament exploring the topics of science fiction, hip hop and mixing, and Fade In, Fade Out (Motown), (1986), a soul- and R&B-oriented montage. Warp 9's image is best described on the cover of its 12" single "Light Years Away," with Milton (Boe) Brown (Warp 9's lead singer), Chuck Wansley, and session singer Ada Dyer in their trademark sci-fi space suits.

The success of Warp 9's first single, "Nunk," created a large following for the band in the New York metropolitan area resulting in a worldwide deal with Island Records, on its 4th & B'way Records label in the UK, and on Prism Records/Island Records in the U.S. Brian Chin of Billboard called "Nunk" a "very skillful pastiche of a whole passel of recent street and fusion sounds, along with a simple rap." "Nunk" was a watershed for electro music, "next to 'Planet Rock', heralding the arrival of electro hip hop music." The song's title "Nunk," announced the group's musical direction—a fusion of funk and new wave, i.e., NUNK= N-ew wave + f-UNK. Fusing elements from electro-pop, rock, Latin, Afro-Cuban, and hip hop is integral to Warp 9 and to the identity of electro hip hop.

On May 14, 2014, Rob Fitzpatrick of The Guardian, described producers Lotti Golden and Richard Scher as electro-futurists, "working real emotion and intelligence into the world of experimental hip-hop and electro." In the piece, Fitzpatrick describes "Light Years Away"as a "cornerstone of early 80's beatbox afrofuturism," characterizing the track as "a brilliantly spare and sparse piece of electro hip-hop traversing inner and outer space, matching rolling congas with vocoder voices and the hiss and sizzle of cutting edge synth and drum-machine technology."

Warp 9's third single, "Beat Wave" (1983) is best described by David Toop: "Their [Golden and Scher] commitment to a medium generally considered junk food is disarming." Fitzpatrick continues the analogy: "The genius of Warp 9 is how [it] took what was considered a throwaway music and invested it with real emotion and intelligence."

== Past members ==
- Ada Dyer – vocals
- Carolyn Harding – vocals
- Chuck Wansley – vocals
- Kathrine Joyce – vocals (also collaborated with the Shades of Love)
- Milton Brown – drums

== Discography ==
=== Albums ===
- It's a Beat Wave (Prism, 1983)
- Fade in, Fade Out (Motown/MCA, 1986)

=== Singles ===
Year	Title	Peak chart positions		
Year	Title	US Dance	US R&B	UK
1982	"Nunk (New Wave Funk)"	11	50	―
1983	"Light Years Away"	21	52	―
1983	"No Man Is an Island"	17	—	―
1983	"Beat Wave"	―	―	―
1983	"Master of the Mix"	―	―	―
1985	"Skips a Beat"	12	—	88
"—" denotes releases that did not chart.
