= Black Bike Week =

Annual motorcycle rally in Myrtle Beach, South Carolina

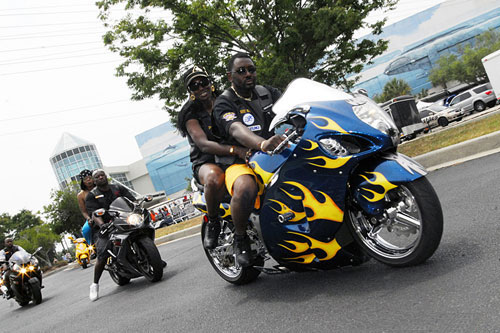
- A custom Suzuki Hayabusa at Black Bike Week
- Genre: Motorcycle rally
- Date: Memorial Day weekend
- Frequency: Annual
- Locations: Greater Grand Strand, South Carolina
- Years active: 46
- Inaugurated: 1980
- Participants: 350,000

Black Bike Week, also called Atlantic Beach Bikefest, Black Bikers Week, and The Black Pearl Cultural Heritage and Bike Festival, is an annual motorcycle rally in the Myrtle Beach, South Carolina area, held on Memorial Day weekend. Black Bike Week is "all about riding, styling and profiling," in the words of Mayor Irene Armstrong of Atlantic Beach, South Carolina.

It is the largest African American motorcycle rally in the US. Attendance has been variously reported as 350,000, 375,000, and as high as 400,000. It is considered the third or fourth largest motorcycle rally in the United States. Around 10–15 percent of motorcyclists in the US are women, while at major African American motorcycle rallies, such as Black Bike Week or the National Bikers Roundup, women make up close to half of participants.

From 1940 until 2008, Myrtle Beach had also hosted a predominantly white motorcycle rally, called Harley-Davidson Week, also called the spring Carolina Harley-Davidson Dealer's Association Rally (CHDDA Rally). Due to unequal city policies such as different traffic rules and greater policing during Black Bike Week, the National Association for the Advancement of Colored People and individual rally participants have charged, as well as sued, the city government and local businesses with racial discrimination because of different treatment towards the black rally. In 2002 Black Bike week had 375,000 attendees, versus 200,000 for Harley-Davidson Week of the same year.

The city of Myrtle Beach has used new ordinances to push the 2009 and 2010 motorcycle events, both black and white, out of the city, where they have been welcomed by other municipalities and businesses, and bikers still came in spite of the official efforts to discourage them. After the 2010 motorcycle rallies, the South Carolina Supreme Court overturned the Myrtle Beach city ordinance requiring all motorcyclists to wear helmets, and four other ordinances.

"Black Bike Week" can also refer to a side event to the motorcycle rally Daytona Beach Bike Week at Daytona Beach, Florida that happens two months earlier, in March. Like the South Carolina event, the Daytona rally also has its origins in racial segregation, when blacks created their own parallel event after being excluded from the main white festival.

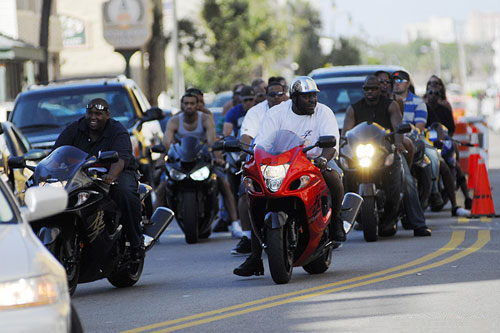
Red and black Hayabusas in traffic at Black Bike Week Festival 2008

== Origin ==
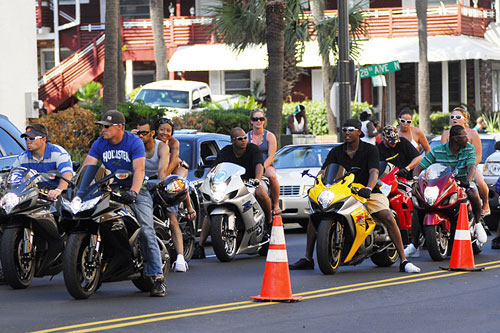
Riders in traffic at the 2008 Black Bike Week

During the 1960s and 1970s, many black motorcyclists visited Atlantic Beach, South Carolina. Many of these motorcyclists rode Harley-Davidsons, but a significant amount favored imported Hondas, Kawasakis, Suzukis, and Yamahas, while motorcyclists attending the CHDDA rally preferred Harley-Davidsons. During the segregation era, Atlantic Beach was the only beach in the South where blacks were permitted.

The Black Bike Week rally, originally called the Atlantic Beach Memorial Day BikeFest, was founded in Atlantic Beach by the Flaming Knight Riders motorcycle club in 1980. The first rally drew about 100 participants. Though one reason the Flaming Knight Riders worked with the City of Atlantic Beach to create the event was to make money for the town, it was not actually franchised by Atlantic Beach, and the city did not benefit financially; instead, bikers would, over the years, congregate more and more in Myrtle Beach rather than Atlantic Beach. In 1982, the Flaming Knight Riders were renamed the Carolina Knight Riders motorcycle club.

By the 1990s the event had grown to include the greater Grand Strand area. In 2002, Atlantic Beach hired a public relations firm "to make the rest of the country aware of Atlantic Beach, its uniqueness as a predominantly black beach town and its potential as a vacation spot." This was part of a larger effort to promote the motorcycle rally by the Bike Week Task Force, a group of business owners and public officials from around the Grand Strand area.

The predominantly white rally dates to May 1940, when a group of Harley-Davidson dealers created The Piedmont Harley-Davidson Dealers Association which became The Carolina Harley-Davidson Dealers Association when South Carolina dealers joined. The group's first event was a ride to Ocean Drive in Myrtle Beach, and included a drag race and dirt track race and other festivities. In subsequent years the rally was held in Cherry Grove, Jacksonville and Wilmington, North Carolina before returning to Myrtle Beach. The 2009 event was at New Bern, North Carolina, and the 2010 rally was planned for the same location, two weeks before Memorial Day weekend.

== Atlantic Beach Bikefest events ==
The town of Atlantic Beach hosted a street festival title The Atlantic Beach Bikefest, host by NDA Game Entertainment during the Memorial Day Black Bike Week weekend.

Custom motorcycle builders, parts suppliers and motorcycle dealers provide a focal point for activities during Bikefest, displaying their wares and using motorcycle stunt shows or other entertainment to attract crowds. Motorcycle clubs coming together and networking is a large part of the activity as well, described by some participants as "an event to be recognized" where "clubs came out to rep their colors", and "mostly just to have fun".

Past efforts to centrally organize Bikefest events have failed, with the activity remaining mostly spontaneous. Cruising and street parties flourish while people dance in the streets, hug, kiss, and hop on the back of strangers' bikes. Vendors sold food, T-shirts, mix CDs, and offered wheelie rides on customized motorcycles. Live entertainment includes nightly gospel and other music, and daily motorcycle stunt shows.

Attendance at the 2010 Bikefest events held in Atlantic Beach appeared to be up over 2009, with greater variety in entertainment, merchandise and services offered. Atlantic Beach Town Manager William Booker said there are more families with children, and that, "We have a lot more going on in terms of vendors this year, including more people who are selling parts and upgrades for bikes, which is something we're really working to get more of. People are literally getting their bikes worked on today, which hasn't happened a lot in the past."

On December 1, 2014, a task force approved a 23-mile loop to allow better traffic flow after trouble at the 2014 event. During certain hours on Memorial Day weekend 2015, Ocean Boulevard south of 29th Avenue North would be southbound only with traffic allowed to enter and exit the road only in specific locations, and the loop would continue on Kings Highway, Harrelson Boulevard which becomes George Bishop Parkway, Waccamaw Boulevard which runs parallel to U.S. 501, Carolina Bays Parkway, Grissom Parkway, U.S. 17 Bypass and 29th Avenue North.

Police said the loop worked, while some bikers had problems dealing with the confusion, and some felt unwelcome and called the measures "overreaction". The loop was used again in 2016, and the same route was planned for 2017. Some who felt mistreated want to boycott Myrtle Beach in 2017, while the City of Myrtle Beach responded that Bike Week is "not an organized event" and requires additional measures to make it safe. The NAACP called the loop "discriminatory" since it was only used for the one event and filed suit in federal court. Since then, for certain events, the only restriction has been making Ocean Boulevard southbound only south of 29th Avenue, with a limited number of locations to access Kings Highway, and with the northbound lane used only for emergency vehicles. The "chute" was used again in 2024, with nine entrances to Ocean Boulevard in five miles starting at 29th Avenue North, and no through traffic on certain streets: business owners and drivers did not like it. In 2025, "flushing" included 10 access points from Ocean Boulevard to Kings Highway.

As of 2017 the event was called The Black Pearl Cultural Heritage and Bike Festival.

For 2020, the Atlantic Beach Bikefest was postponed and finally cancelled due to the COVID-19 pandemic.

On March 2, 2021, it was announced that Atlantic Beach Bikefest had been cancelled for the second year in a row according to Town Manager, Benjamin Quattlebaum Jr. The decision to cancel the event was decided during the March 1, 2021 town council meeting, though there was the possibility of holding an event on either Labor Day or sometime later in the year depending on the effectiveness of vaccines.

On March 7, 2022, the town council voted not to allow open carry during events. Town documents showed the festival would resume in May 2022.

== Charges of racial bias ==
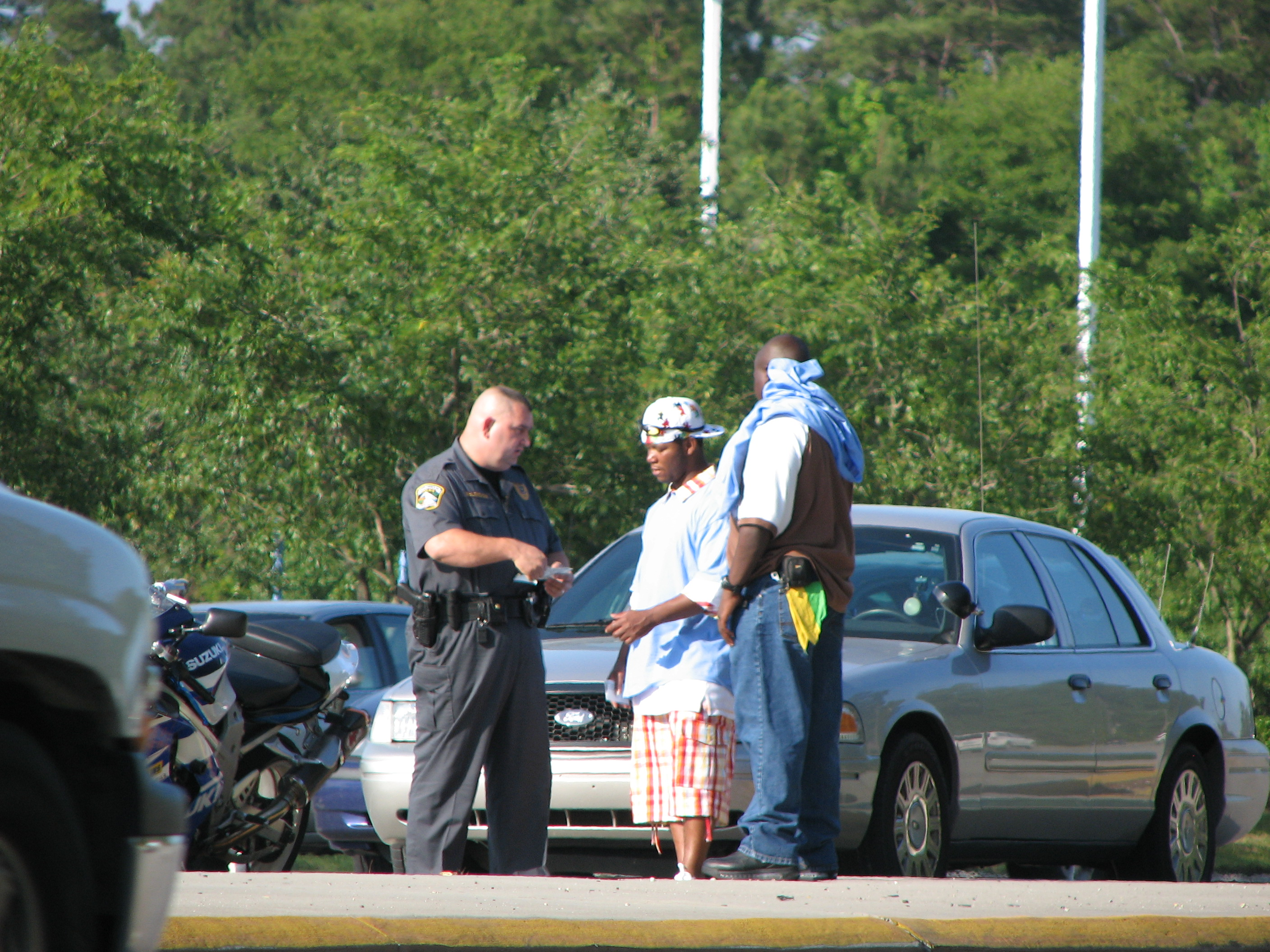
Traffic stop at Black Bike Week 2007

In 2003 a group of black motorcyclists, and the South Carolina chapter of the NAACP, sued the city of Myrtle Beach and some businesses there alleging discrimination. The city was accused of abusing traffic law enforcement and of excessive force by the police to harass black bikers. Many businesses closed their doors or cut back their hours during Black Bike Week, and 28 of them, including Red Lobster and Denny's were named in the suit. A Baltimore, Maryland police detective who is also a motorcyclist told The New York Times, "I've seen it myself. When the white bikers come to Myrtle Beach, the town rolls out the red carpet. When the black riders come, they roll it right up." City officials said that the much younger crowd, and nearly double attendance, of Black Bike Week justified the difference in the city's response to the two events.

In a May 25, 2003 article in the New York Times, Jeffrey Gettleman reported that a pattern had emerged of black social and party events growing ever larger in stature and then collapsing and quickly being shut down, particularly in the Southern United States. Examples given included Freaknik in Atlanta, Georgia, spring break in Biloxi, Mississippi, and various festivals in New Orleans, Louisiana, and Virginia Beach, Virginia. Myrtle Beach Mayor Mark McBride said in 2003 that the Black Bike Week crowds are "bigger and rowdier," although that year the white Harley rally had eight motorcycle traffic deaths, while the black Memorial Day rally had three motorcycle traffic deaths.

In 2008, the NAACP issued a press release claiming success in concluding every federal discrimination lawsuit they had filed in Myrtle Beach for complaints during bike week events from 1999–2003, against the City of Myrtle Beach, and restaurants that included Damon's Oceanfront and Barefoot Landing, J. Edward's Great Ribs, and Greg Norman's Australian Grill, as well as the Yachtsman Resort Hotel. In a settlement with the city, the police department agreed to use the same traffic pattern on the city's main boulevard for Black Bike Week as they did for Harley Bike Week.

From 2005 through 2008 the NAACP carried out "Operation Bike Week Justice" in which a complaint hotline was operated, and teams monitored police treatment of African Americans, and the reaction of local businesses, as well as monitoring traffic patterns. Friendly's Ice Cream Corporation and Myrtle Beach Friends Boulevard LLC was sued in 2008 by the NAACP for allegedly closing their indoor area and offering inferior outdoor service during Black Bike Weeks from 2000–2005.

According to an NAACP lawsuit, The Yachtsman Resort Hotel had required Black Bike Week guests to sign a thirty-four rule guest contract, prepay for their hotel bill and show photo ID. The hotel agreed to settle the case, and in addition to a payment of $1.2 million, the hotel agreed to provide future discounts and make policy changes including yearly anti-discrimination training for employees. The settlement did not require the hotel to admit to discrimination.

In 2010, the NAACP released a press release indicating that it would continue to monitor police and local businesses for possible discrimination.

On February 27, 2018, the NAACP and others sued the city of Myrtle Beach claiming that their police officers treated African Americans differently and more harshly. On December 2, 2020, the NAACP suit went to trial. A jury ruled on December 10 that while the actions were "racially motivated", they would likely have been the same had race not been a factor.

== Myrtle Beach ban ==
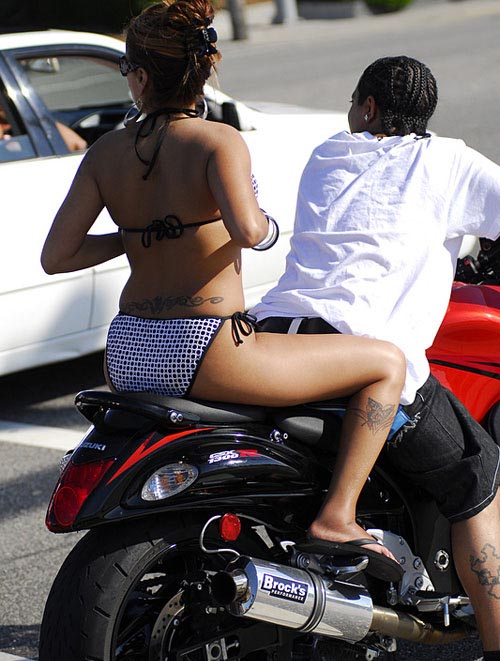
Bike Week 2008

In 2008, the Myrtle Beach City Council announced it would no longer host motorcycle rallies, and approved a set of ordinances on September 23, 2008, that placed restrictions on motorcycle rallies. Fifteen laws were passed, restricting muffler noise, requiring helmets within city limits, limiting parking to two bikes per space, restricting loitering in parking lots, and more. In spite of this, Black Bike Week 2009's attendance was only reduced slightly. Vendors, hotels, biker groups and promoters attempted to schedule events for Black Bike Week 2010 despite the Myrtle Beach government's ban.

In anticipation of the 2010 Harley Bike Week rally, a local Harley-Davidson dealership said events would still take place for their bike week event, but on a reduced schedule of only 5 days, May 11 to 16, while the website Myrtle Beach Bike Week, LLC says a full-length rally of May 7–16 would take place. Both sources say there would be no vendors inside the city limits of Myrtle Beach during the Harley Bike Week, and they both encouraged attendees to boycott the city and patronize those communities and businesses outside the city which did support Harley Bike Week.

The Myrtle Beach Convention Center had ceased attempting to find a replacement for the Carolina Harley-Davidson Dealers Association, which had moved to Hard Rock Park. The reason for moving The Carolina Harley-Davidson Dealers Association event to New Bern in 2009 was that Myrtle Beach, "passed all these silly laws, they said we ruined their May, so we talked about it and decided to oblige them," said Gene Lummus, former president of the association.

Another proposed rally, a Harley Owners Group convention, would take place May 18–22, 2010, at North Myrtle Beach, about 15 miles (24 km) up the coast from Myrtle Beach.

=== Helmet law struck down ===
On June 8, 2010, the South Carolina Supreme Court overturned a Myrtle Beach city ordinance requiring all motorcyclists to wear helmets, on the grounds that the state law, requiring helmets only for riders under age 21, cannot be preempted by a city ordinance. The court ruled unanimously that in addition to the priority of state law, the local ordinance created undue confusion for motorists, and that the city itself had invalidated their helmet ordinance and some other ordinances also passed to suppress motorcycle rallies, in a subsequent amendment. The ruling took effect immediately, requiring that pending citations be dismissed, the records of those cited under the ordinance be expunged, and all fines collected be returned.

The state Supreme Court had heard arguments on February 3, 2010, in a lawsuit by two groups of plaintiffs seeking to overturn the ordinance. One group of plaintiffs was made up of 49 motorcyclists who had been cited for not wearing helmets in Myrtle Beach. The second plaintiff was the organization Business Owners Organized to Save Tourism (BOOST) along with South Carolina State Representative Thad Viers. BOOST's mission includes ending "the practice of ‘selective tourism,’ whereby government entities and/or organizations welcome some individual and group tourists but discourage others." Viers, a Republican representing Myrtle Beach, said, "There's certain things cities can do, and making up their own traffic laws is not one of them. I believe the law and the constitution are on our side."

During the hearing in February, Justice Don Beatty said to Mike Battle, Myrtle Beach's lawyer, that, "I realize the issue is narrow here, but don’t pretend like we don’t know what’s going on. We read. We all know why the city," passed the ordinances, questioning whether the intent of the law was not to promote safety but rather to curtail motorcycle rallies. Justice Costa Pleicones told Viers that the city's interest in regulating noise, lewd behavior and nuisances was legitimate.

In defense of the ordinance, the city's court filings argued six key points, among them that their helmet law was constitutional and did not contradict the state traffic code. Myrtle Beach's attorney Mike Battle also argued that because the state law was silent on whether adults must wear helmets, only addressing riders under 21, that cities had the freedom to make their own laws with respect to those over 21. Battle also argued that the benefits of the helmet law were greater than the inconvenience.

The ruling prompted speculation that motorcyclists would return to Myrtle Beach in greater numbers. Some motorcycle rally participants immediately booked rooms for the next year, while others vowed never to return to Myrtle Beach, instead favoring businesses outside the city limits.

=== Myrtle Beach City Council relax noise ordinance ===
Months after Tom McGrath filed a suit on behalf of business owners and residents against the noise ordinance enacted by the city to push away motorcycle rallies, the Myrtle Beach city council increased the noise limit. Motor vehicles were limited to a level of 89 decibels while the engine is running at idle speed, but now motor vehicles may operate as high as 99 decibels which is more in alignment with national standards.

== 2014 shootings ==
During the 2014 Atlantic Beach Bikefest, three people were killed and one wounded in shootings at the Bermuda Sands Motel in Myrtle Beach about 15 miles from the rally. Police said that normally during the rally they see motorcycle crashes and minor offenses but that violence was unusual.

After the incidents, South Carolina governor Nikki Haley said on May 30, 2014, that with the damage to the area's reputation hurting tourism and efforts to attract other industries, "It is time for that Bikefest to come to an end, and that is the way that I am going to talk to the elected officials of Atlantic Beach." Haley, who was in Conway to talk about hurricane safety, emphasized that the incidents do not reflect the state as a whole. The previous day, Atlantic Beach Mayor Jake Evans said the event would not be cancelled; he pointed out that the vast majority of bikers are good people. Chief Warren Gall of the Myrtle Beach Police Department, however, believed the shooting was related to the rally.

At a summit held September 22 and 23 and attended by local officials and police officers from different areas, Haley said that while she still opposed the event, "They can continue to have Bikefest if they follow our rules."

== See also ==
- Urban Beach Week, also on the Memorial Day weekend.
