= Hip Hop goes Theatre =

International hip-hop theater festival

- Location: Republic Salzburg, Salzburg, AT
- Founded: 2008
- Type of play(s): hip-hop theatre
- Festival date: every year in September
- Website: http://www.hhgt.at

Hip Hop goes Theatre is an international hip-hop theatre festival based in Salzburg, Austria, that was founded in 2008 and is produced annually by the NPO Urban Foundation. It has been under the artistic direction of Alexander Wengler and Sergej Pumper since its inception. Since 2012 the two-day festival has been hosted at the "Republic Salzburg" venue, developing new theatre work with local and international hip-hop artists.

== Festival origin ==
In 2007 the members of the dance company Nobulus, founded the festival after performing at "Breakin Convention" in London.

"Hip Hop goes Theatre" is supported by the Arts Councils of Salzburg.

== See also ==
- List of hip hop music festivals
- Hip hop culture
- Breakin' Convention
- Battle of the Year
- The Notorious IBE
