= Buffalo Soldiers MC =

African-American motorcycle club

- Abbreviation: NABSTMC
- Founded: October 1993
- Founded at: Chicago, Illinois
- Type: 501 (c) 3
- Purpose: Service club and motorcycle club
- Members: 5,000
- Website: www.nabstmc.com

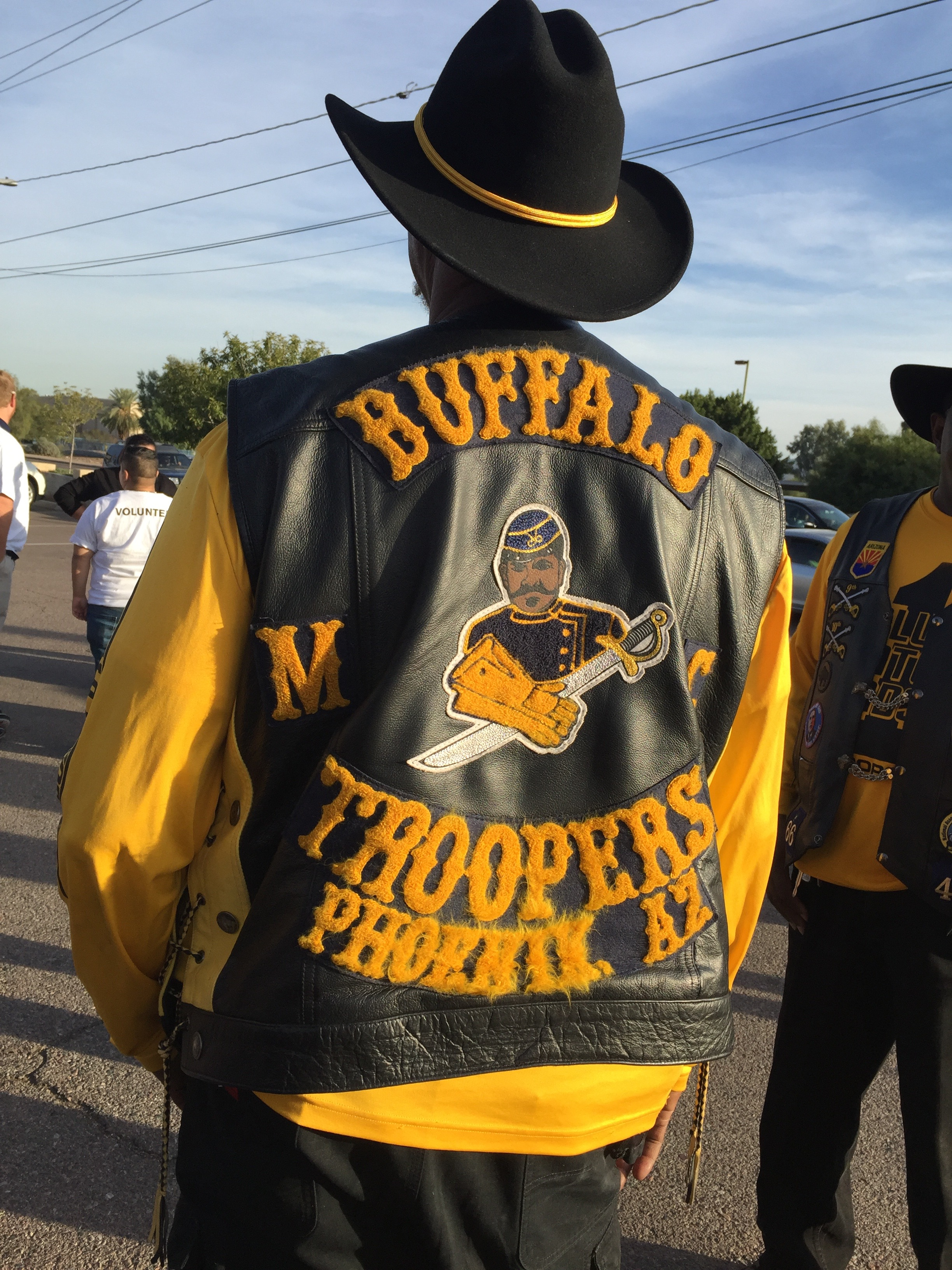

The Buffalo Soldiers Motorcycle Club (NABSMC) is a Black (African-American) motorcycle club in the United States, named for the historic African-American United States Army regiments known as Buffalo Soldiers, seen in their patch. It is one of the biggest Black motorcycle clubs in the US and the biggest African American motorcycle club in Chicago, with 140+ chapters as of 2019, with over 5000 members across the USA.

== History ==
The first club chapter was founded by Ken Thomas, a Chicago police officer, in 1993 or 1994.

The National Association of Buffalo Soldiers/Troopers Motorcycle Clubs (NABSTMC) was formed c. 1999.

The organization was officially created at the 1999 National Round-Up. There a meeting was held, invited to that meeting were Presidents and Vice Presidents of most of the MC that at the time were using the name Buffalo Soldiers. There were 5 clubs loosely aligned but using the Chicago scholey (emblem worn on the uniform vest). Those clubs were Chicago, IL(Troopers), Florida, Delaware, Virginia, and New Jersey, and California. There also were representatives from Chicago, IL (Buffalo Soldier MC), Grand Rapids, MI, Dallas TX, Kokomo, IN, St Louis MO, and Harrisburg, PA. Each of those clubs had their own individual scholey (emblem worn on the uniform vest). The meeting was organized by Carl Laury who several years earlier had taken the Chicago scholey to Florida and created the third chapter of what was to become organization. Laury had traveled across the US in 1999 visiting the above named MC to invite them to the meeting in an effort to unite the various factions under one banner. While the meeting failed to convince the reps from IL, MI, TX, IN, MO and PA of the need to organize the ByLaws that Laury presented to the entire group convinced the rest that it was time to move forward. Those initial ByLaws were ratified and set the principles in place that the organization still follows to this day.

== Activities ==
Chapters participate in many charitable activities across the United States, including: providing "Soldiers' Thanksgiving" Thanksgiving turkeys, hams and other necessities for poor families in Tacoma, Washington; fundraising for victims of the 2010 Tennessee floods; highway adoption and adopting a nursing home for monthly visits in Clarksville, Tennessee and mentoring jail inmates in Alexandria, Virginia. They also have a historical educational program concerning the contributions made by their namesake Buffalo Soldiers of the U.S. Army.

The group is enrolled as part of an official motorcycle safety mentorship program in cooperation with the United States Army.

=== Rallies ===
The group also is an organizer of the National Bikers Roundup, a national motorcycle rally that draws tens of thousands of participants who spend millions of dollars at the rally (estimated $10 million in 2004).

The annual Buffalo Thunder Rally from Maryland suburbs to the African American Civil War Memorial in Washington D.C. started in 2002 or 2004. Some riders stay to participate in the subsequent Rolling Thunder Run motorcycle rally. About 1,500 riders participated in 2013.

== Membership and organization ==
An academic paper on the organization and its context in African-American culture described it as a "unique recreational, service, and educational organization".

The national headquarters official website states "we are not a 1% club and we claim no territory." Membership requires possession of a 750 cc or greater displacement motorcycle from any manufacturer, a valid drivers license, and insurance.

Membership includes African-American men and women, mostly active-duty and retired military, law enforcement and professionals. Identification as member of a particular race is not a membership requirement.

The national organization is composed of several regional/geographic "frontiers" in the United States: Northeast; Southeast; Great Lakes; Central and Western. Within each frontier, there are local chapters; the first chapter in a state is designated the "mother chapter" with certain responsibilities for establishing new chapters. A member who relocates to an "open state", or certain other conditions, is a "member-at-large", who is affiliated with the national group but not any local chapter.
