= Young London into Music =

Urban youth festival in London

Young London: Into Music
- Genre: Hip Hop, Pop, Grime, Urban.
- Dates: 26 June – 2 August 2009
- Locations: Various Locations, London, England
- Years active: 2009
- Website: createlondon.org

Young London: Into Music is an urban youth festival comprising five events taking place in the Olympic boroughs of London from June until August and first held in 2009.

== Young London: Into Music Festival Details ==
Young London: Into Music is a youth music project funded by the Arts Council of England and LDA. It is a key strand of CREATE09 – the multi-genre, multi-event festival of culture that will be celebrating a wealth of music and art in the Olympic and Paralympic Host Boroughs between 22 June and 2 August 2009. It will feature over 300 events across festivals, performance, music, design, theatre, architecture, comedy, fine arts and heritage. The festival is an official part of the Cultural Olympiad and has been awarded the Inspire Brand. Over a series of five individual events produced and delivered in the five Olympic and Paralympic Host Boroughs (Greenwich, Hackney, Newham, Tower Hamlets and Waltham Forest), over 100 young people between 14 and 25 years old will receive professional mentoring and the chance to work with established artists.

Each event will showcase some of the boroughs rising stars, alongside a number of names in grime, dance, dubstep and indie. So far artists such as Bashy, Ms Dynamite, Roachford, Leon Jean Marie, Double S, Ghetts and MOBO award-winning Akala have been confirmed as performing artists.

A large part of the group who will be mentored by Young London: Into Music fall under the socially excluded banner and are ‘Not in Employment, Education or Training’ (NEET). By working with industry professionals, the young participants will engage in the development of new music content; curate, produce and promote a series of events alongside high-profile artists.

The project aims to foster links between participants and record labels, publishers, promoters, broadcasters, producers and artists; in addition to instilling self-confidence and professional work experience to all its youth contributors.

== The Delivery Partner Events ==
Rising Tide @ Ocean, 26 June, 7pm Hackney
Rising Tide's event will feature live performances by unknown local talent who get to share the bill with Ms Dynamite, Akala and more.

Music Matrix, 14–17 July, Greenwich
In partnership with Bashy, an aural narrative installation will be exhibited in the Greenwich Heritage Centre, Artillery Square, SE18. The narration will be a compilation of interviews conducted by local young people with the older generation about their perspective on life today and how things have changed.

Continental Drifts, 16 July, at Rough Trade East, Tower Hamlets
Continental Drifts are based in Waltham Forest. For this event, indie band The Brute Chorus are set to perform a live set at Rough Trade East – recently named as one of the top 20 best retailers in the world by Tyler Brûlé's Monocle magazine, with more guests to be confirmed.

Urban Development, 23 July, Stratford Circus, Stratford
Urban Development are hosts of regular club nights ‘iluvlive’ at Cargo amongst others. Urban Development will host a specially commissioned Young London: Into Music event at Stratford Circus with artists such as Ghetts and Leon Jean Marie, with more guests to be confirmed.

Biggafish @ Underage Festival, 2 August, Victoria Park, Tower Hamlets
The festival finale partners with Underage, the world's first under 19's festival with a carnival performance from Brazilian influenced drumming troupe the Bigga Bloco.

== 2010 events ==
In 2010, events were held from 17 June to 1 August, with the Soundstage Showcase on 15 June.

== See also ==
- List of hip hop festivals
