= SF International HipHop DanceFest =

Annual event in San Francisco, CA, US

International SF HipHop DanceFest
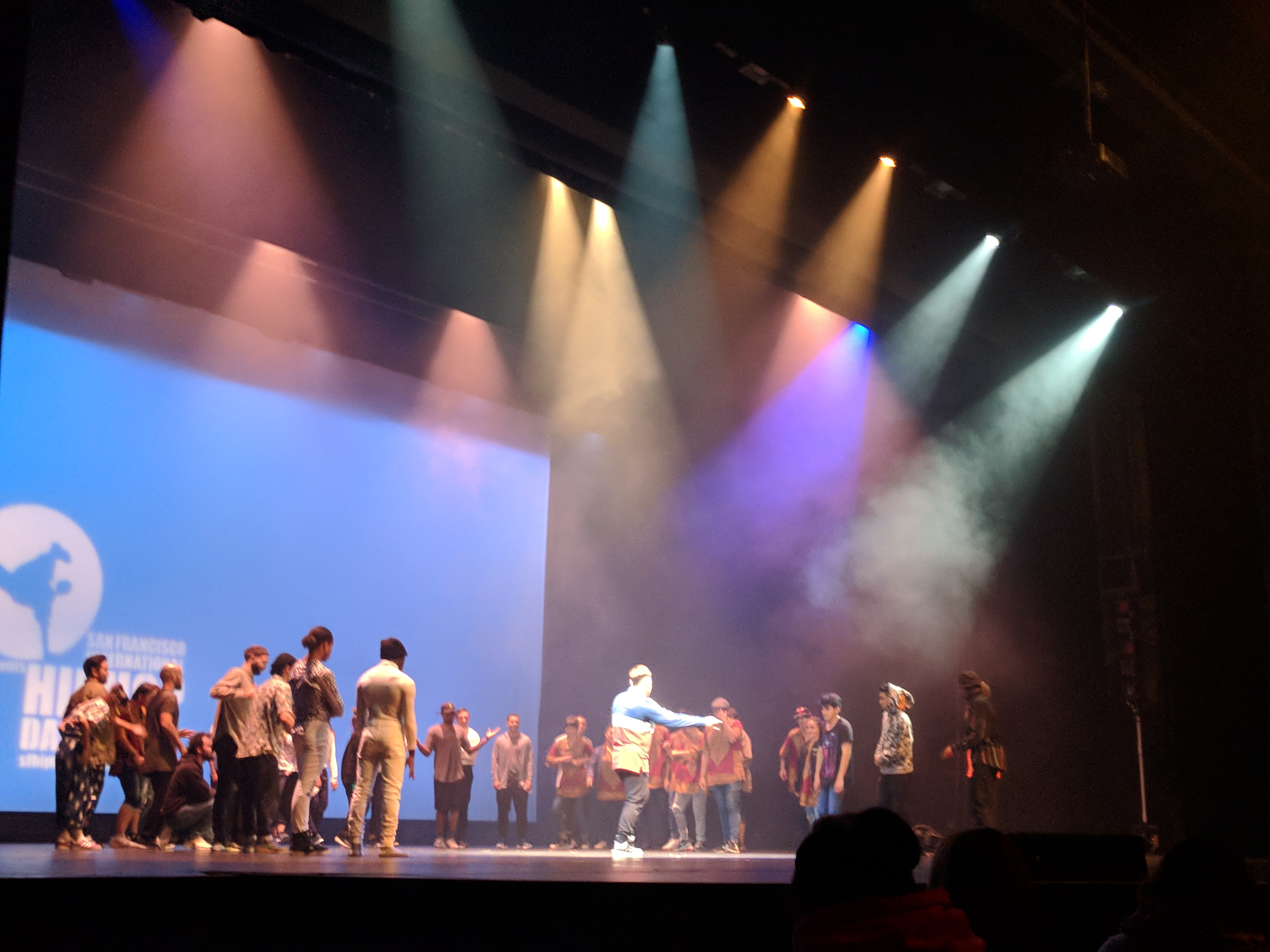
- Freestyle cypher ring on stage at the SF International HipHop Dancefest
- Genre: Hip hop
- Dates: Weekend in November
- Locations: San Francisco, California, United States
- Years active: 1999 - present
- Founders: Micaya
- Website: www.sfhiphopdancefest.com

The SF International HipHop DanceFest is an annual hiphop dance and music event in San Francisco, California. It was founded in 1999 by Micaya.

== Overview ==
The DanceFest, curated by Micaya, has a focus on community and collaboration rather than competition or battles, showcasing many different hiphop styles from around the world. These hiphop dance styles include popping, locking, strutting, house, krumping, waacking, turfing, breaking, and many more, with West Coast styles well represented. The festival fundraises each year in order to fully fund artist travel and hotel expenses. Each year has an overarching theme, often emphasizing social commentary, as well as bringing street styles to a fine arts stage.

== History ==
=== 1999 ===
The First Annual SF International HipHop DanceFest was held at Theatre Artaud in San Francisco.

=== 2020 ===
In 2020, because of the COVID-19 pandemic, the DanceFest took place virtually. Speakers included RuPaul, Alicia Garza, performance artist Kenichi Ebina, and radio personality Sterling James.

== See also ==
- List of hip hop music festivals
- Hip hop culture
