= Hip-hop theater =

Theatrical genre

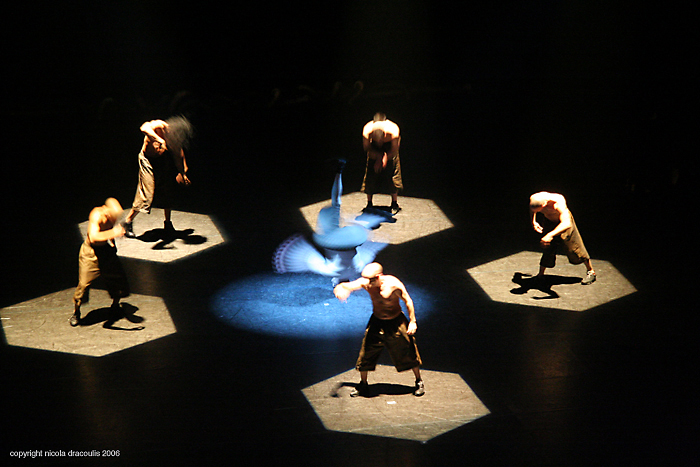
French hip-hop dance company Franck II Louise performing at Breakin' Convention 2006.

Hip-hop theater is a form of theater that presents contemporary stories through the use of one or more of the four elements of hip-hop culture—b-boying, graffiti writing, MCing (rapping), and DJing. Other cultural markers of hip-hop such as spoken word, beatboxing, and hip-hop dance can be included as well although they are not always present. What is most important is the language of the theatrical piece and the plot's relevance to the world. Danny Hoch, the founder of the Hip-Hop Theater Festival, further defines it as such: "Hip-hop theatre must fit into the realm of theatrical performance, and it must be by, about and for the hip-hop generation, participants in hip-hop culture, or both."

Hip-hop theater productions appear in a wide range of platforms including single performances, week-long festivals, and traveling repertory companies. Board Chair Of the historic Philadelphia Freedom Theater and producing Director Of The Devon Theater Of Mayfair Karl Dice Raw Jenkins is the leader in hiphop theater with multiple of Grammy nominations as a singer producer and Playwright, The Last Jimmy [The kümmel, Freedom Theater, Adrienne Arsht & La Grand performances have all presented Karl. Karl's other works include Box A Hiphop Musical telling the life of enslaved African American Henry Box Brown. The King Of Love and more. Marc Bamuthi Joseph is a spoken word poet and dancer who has been commissioned several times to create and direct single hip-hop theater works. British choreographer Jonzi D is the artistic director of the London-based Breakin' Convention, a week long hip-hop theater festival. Rennie Harris, Mourad Merzouki, Kwesi Johnson and Victor Quijada are artistic directors who run hip-hop theater companies in the U.S., France, UK and Canada respectively. The Rock Steady Crew, Magnificent Force, and the Rhythm Technicians pioneered this theatrical genre which started in the United States.

== History ==
Though hip-hop culture has managed to establish itself on film, on television, in fashion, in music, and in the dance industry, it has not gained the same momentum in theater. Stage productions are few in number but growing. The first hip-hop stage shows were 1990's. 1994 Saw Kwesi Johnson's 'Searching for a Shaman' premier on 20 April at Nott Dance Festival, off Broadway musical So! What Happens Now?, 1995's Jam on the Groove which were co-authored, co-directed, and co-choreographed by Jorge "Popmaster Fabel" Pabon and Steffan "Mr. Wiggles" Clemente. Rock Steady Crew, Magnificent Force, and the Rhythm Technicians performed in both shows. Aside from the pioneers in New York City was Lorenzo "Rennie" Harris' Puremovement (RHPM) hip-hop theater company which Harris founded in 1992 in Philadelphia. The company has toured all over the world showcasing its original works such as March of the Antmen, P-Funk, Endangered Species, Facing Mekka, and Rome & Jewels. RHPM also organizes the annual Illadelph Legends Festival which brings together the pioneers—the people who were b-boying, locking, and popping in the 1970s when these styles were developed—and respected practitioners of hip-hop dance to teach master classes, give lecture demonstrations, and participate in panel discussions.

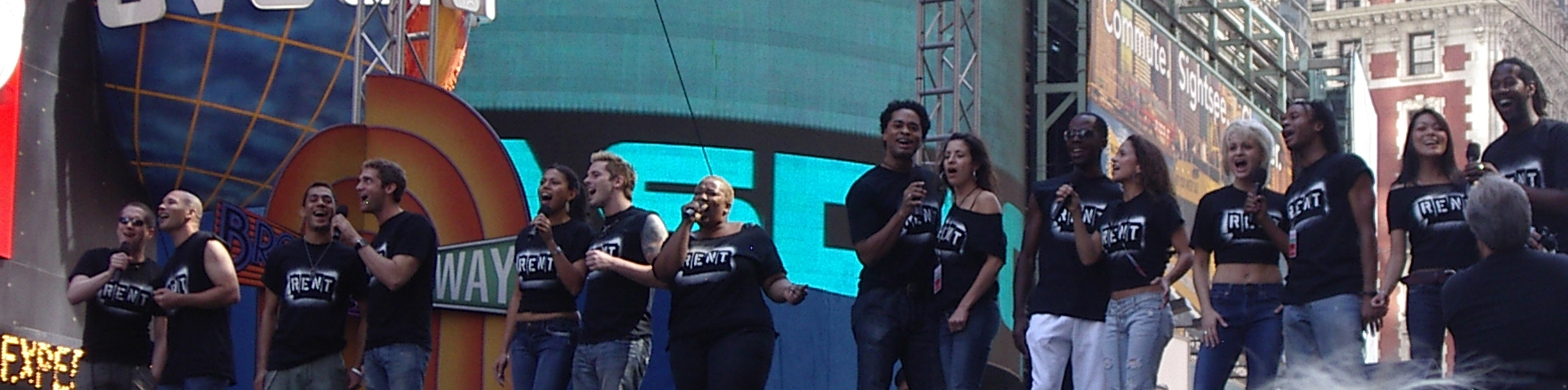
In the 2000s, popular Broadway musicals such as Rent incorporated hip hop music influences. This picture shows the Broadway cast from 2005.

Hip hop music continues to influence musical theater. Rap is used popular musicals such as Rent and Dreamgirls While more notable for funk than hip hop, the Broadway musical Bring in 'da Noise, Bring in 'da Funk fuses tap dance and hip hop dance styles, and includes rap. Hip hop music was used in Off Broadway shows in the 1990s and early 2000s, with the musicals So! What Happens Now? and Jam on the Groove. In the Heights used hip hop music, rapping and hip hop dancing. With music and lyrics by Lin Manuel Miranda and book by Quiara Alegría Hudes, it was performed off Broadway in 2007. The 2008 Broadway production fused salsa and hip hop styles, and included rap. Miranda brought hip hop to Richard Rodgers Theater a second time in 2015 with his production Hamilton. The show had box office success. Hamilton and In the Heights included rap and the cast recording of Hamilton made a number one album on the Billboard rap charts. The success of Hamilton shows that hip hop can have a key role in musical theater.

== Repertory companies ==
Other hip-hop theater companies were founded in the 1990s. Compagnie Käfig is a French hip-hop theater company of mostly Algerian descent founded in 1995 by Mourad Merzouki. Their performances mix standard b-boying, locking, and popping with capoeira, mime, and gymnastics. They use the same fusion in music by mixing rap music with classical music and Andalusian guitar. While on tour in the U.S. they performed at Jacob's Pillow in Massachusetts and at the Joyce Theater in New York. Bintou Dembélé performed at the Joyce Theater in New York with Mourad Merzouki's Compagnie Käfig in 2002. That same year she created her own dance company, which she describes as being mainly inspired by Pina Bausch's notion of 'danced theater'.

The Groovaloos are a hip-hop theater company based in Los Angeles that was founded by Bradley "Shooz" Rapier. They started out in 1999 as a dance crew and eventually developed a stage show called Groovaloo that is a series of stories based on the true life experiences of the dancers. Company members include Edmundo "Poe One" Loayza, Rynan "Kid Rainen" Paguio from JabbaWockeeZ, and Teresa "Rag Doll" Espinosa from Beat Freaks.

RUBBERBANDance Group (RBDG) was founded in 2002 in Montreal by Los Angeles native Victor Quijada. Quijada first started dancing as a b-boy in Baldwin Park, California. He studied modern dance in high school and after graduating went on to become a professional dancer under Twyla Tharp and Les Grands Ballets Canadiens de Montréal. He started RBDG after leaving the Montreal ballet. The New York Times called the style of dance his company performs "post hip-hop" because it's a fusion of hip-hop dance and ballet.

== Independent performances ==
Marc Bamuthi Joseph is a spoken word poet and playwright who frequently directs independent hip-hop theater productions. Some of his works include Word Becomes Flesh, De/Cipher, and No Man's Land. He collaborated with Rennie Harris in 2007 to create Scourge, a play about Haiti's social-economic struggles. Joseph directed the play while Harris served as the choreographer. In 2008, he created the break/s which is based on the book Can't Stop Won't Stop by Jeff Chang.

Other solo hip-hop theater artists include Sarah Jones who headlined the first Hip-Hop Theater Festival and award-winning playwright Will "Power" Wylie who collaborated with Danny Hock on his one-man play Flow. Also, West Coast feminist writer/performer Aya de Leon whose award-winning show "Thieves in the Temple: The Reclaiming of Hip Hop" focused on fighting sexism and consumerism in hip hop.

== Festivals ==
- Rencontres de la Villette is a two-week hip-hop theater festival started in France in 1996. Unlike the other theater companies mentioned, Recontres de la Villette was started with the help of government subsidies from the Ministry of Culture to promote the arts.
- Hip-Hop Theater Festival was founded in 2000 in New York by playwright and actor Danny Hoch. The week-long festival starts in Washington, D.C., and tours annually to New York, San Francisco, and Chicago.
- Breakin' Convention was started in 2004 by playwright and dancer Jonzi D and is housed annually at Sadler's Wells Theatre in London. Every year starts off with a three-day festival in London. After the London festival, the convention tours to other cities in the United Kingdom.
- Hip Hop goes Theatre is a theater festival that was started in 2008 by dancers Alexander Wengler and Sergej Pumper in Salzburg, Austria.

== See also ==
- Hip-hop culture
- Into the Hoods
- In the Heights
- Hamilton (musical)
- Holler If Ya Hear Me (musical)
