= Marc Bamuthi Joseph =

American dramatist

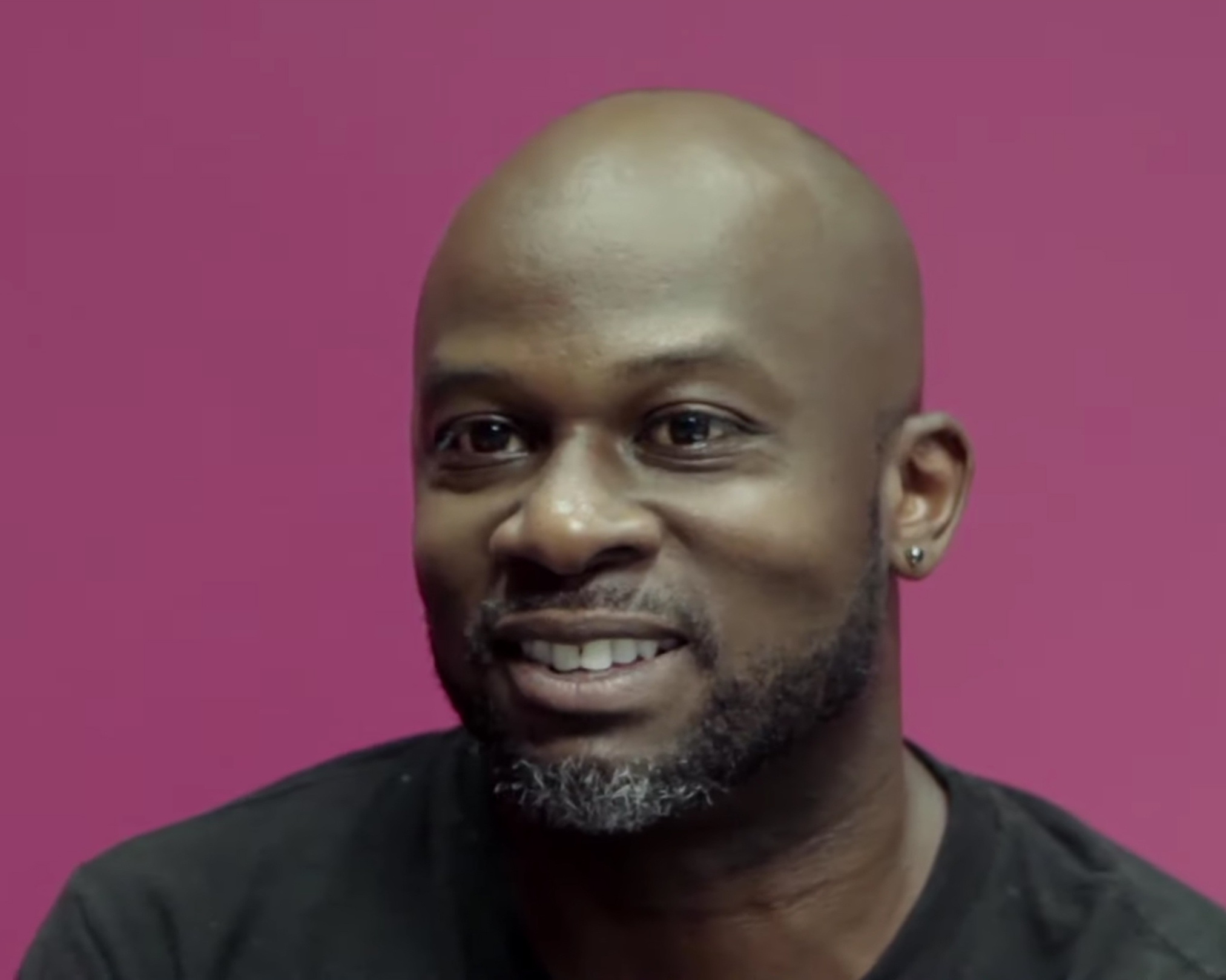
- Joseph in 2014
- Born: 1975 (age 50–51); Laurelton, Queens, New York, U.S.
- Occupations: Poet, dancer, playwright, musician, actor
- Spouse: Kanoelani Connor Joseph
- Children: 2

Marc Bamuthi Joseph (born 1975) is an American spoken-word poet, dancer, playwright, and actor who frequently directs stand-alone hip-hop theater plays.

== Early life ==
Joseph was born to Haitian immigrant parents and grew up in Laurelton, Queens, New York City. When Joseph was 10 years old, he made his Broadway debut as Savion Glover's tap dancing understudy in the musical, The Tap Dance Kid. By age 12, he had appeared on television and toured nationally with the production.

Joseph attended Morehouse College in Atlanta, GA., where he was involved in the spoken word movement with classmate, Saul Williams. After graduating from Morehouse College in 1997, he was hired by The Branson School to teach English and dance.

== Career ==
In 1998, Joseph worked with the Senegalese National Ballet.

In 1999, he became National Poetry Slam champion in 1999 as part of the San Francisco team. He went on to work with Katherine Dunham, Joe Hahn, Mos Def, and Bonnie Raitt.

In 1999 he became the Arts in Education Director and the eventual Artistic Director of Youth Speaks, and helped to name and found the Brave New Voices Festival and Network.

In 2003, he debuted his “choreo-poem”, Word Becomes Flesh, about love, fatherhood, and legacy.

His work was featured in episodes of Russell Simmons' Def Poetry on HBO in 2004 and 2005.

In 2006, he presented Scourge, a hip-hop/spoken word/dance performance reflecting upon his native Haiti's history and future. This was done in collaboration with choreographers Rennie Harris and Adia Whitaker and it was directed by Kamilah Forbes.

In the fall of 2007 he appeared on the cover of Smithsonian Magazine. Two of his works have been featured at the Humana Festival of New American Plays, Chicago, Sudan in 2011, and the break/s in 2008.

In pursuit of affirmations of black life in the public realm, he co-founded the Life is Living Festival for Youth Speaks, and created the installation “Black Joy in the Hour of Chaos” for Creative Time.

=== 2010s ===
Joseph has collaborated twice with composer and violinist Daniel Bernard Roumain. In 2016, he and Roumain toured their joint concert, 'Blackbird, Fly'. We Shall Not Be Moved, commissioned by Opera Philadelphia, was named one of 2017’s “Best Classical Music Performances” by The New York Times, which featured Roumain composition and Joseph opera libretto.

His latest piece, “The Just and the Blind,” investigates the crisis of over-sentencing in the prison industrial complex, and premiered at Carnegie Hall in March 2019.

Joseph with Tom Healy onstage at the Brooklyn Museum's Brooklyn Conference in 2014

Joseph is currently developing The Black Whole, which will debut at Laney College in 2020.

==== Yerba Buena Center for the Arts ====
Joseph premiered his dance theater piece, Red, Black & Green, (a collaboration with artist Theaster Gates) at the Yerba Buena Center for the Arts (YBCA) in 2011. Shortly afterward, he was interviewed for an administrative role at the institution and in February 2012, he became Director of Performing Arts

While at YBCA, he conceptualized the YBCA 100, an annual list of 100 change makers, and the subsequent YBCA 100 Summit. He also developed the YBCA Fellows Program, a year long project for San Francisco Bay Area creatives to engage in dialogue and collaborate on projects together. Their efforts culminate in the annual The Public Square exhibition.

Joseph left his role as Chief of Program and Pedagogy at YBCA at the end of 2018.

==== Kennedy Center ====
Joseph became the Vice President and Artistic Director of Social Impact at the John F. Kennedy Center for the Performing Arts in Washington, D.C., in January 2019.

The Center commissioned him to write his play, /peh-LO-tah/, in 2017. It "explores the matter of black life and the ecology of egalitarianism" through the lens of futbol, pitting the enjoyment of the game against the political realities of the Global South. It toured across North America for three years, including at BAM’s Harvey Theater as a part of the 2017 Next Wave Festival.

He has previously performed at the Center in 2013 for the “One Mic Hip Hop Culture Worldwide” festival, in 2014 for Red, Black & Green: A Blues, and in 2018 for a live performance of Ta-Nehisi Coates’ Between the World and Me.

== Personal life ==
Joseph is married to Kanoelani Connor Joseph, an elementary school teacher. Connor graduated with a Bachelor of Arts in psychology from University of California, Santa Cruz (UCSC) and a Master of Arts in education from University of San Francisco. They have a son and a daughter.

Joseph moved to Oakland in 2001.

== Select awards and recognition ==
- 2006 Creative Capital Award
- 2006 United States Artists Rockefeller Fellowship
- 2011 Herb Alpert Award in Theatre
- 2012 Doris Duke Performing Artist Award
- 2016 Recipient of the Guggenheim Museum Social Practice initiative
- 2017 TED Global Fellow
