= Aya de Leon =

American novelist (born 1967)

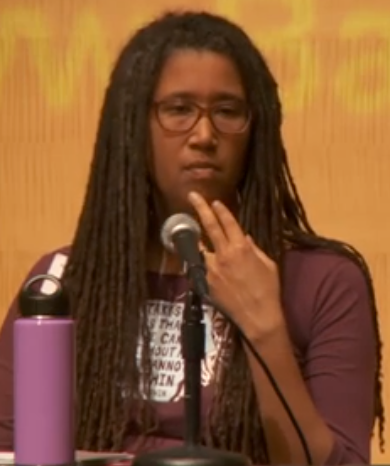
- In a panel discussion at the San Francisco Public Library in 2015
- Born: 1967 (age 58–59); Los Angeles, California, U.S.
- Education: Harvard University (BA); Antioch University Los Angeles (MFA)
- Occupations: Novelist; activist
- Parent(s): Taj Mahal; Anna de Leon
- Website: ayadeleon.wordpress.com

Aya de Leon (born 1967) is an American novelist and activist who teaches at the University of California Berkeley. She first came to national attention as a spoken-word artist in the underground poetry scene in the San Francisco Bay Area, and as a hip-hop theater artist. de Leon is of Puerto Rican, African-American, and West Indian heritage, and much of her work explores issues of race, gender, socio-economic class, body, nation and the climate crisis.

== Early life ==
De Leon was born in Los Angeles in 1967. She is the daughter of Taj Mahal and his first wife, Anna de Leon.

== Career ==
De Leon attended Harvard University, where she received a Bachelor of Arts. After, she returned to the Bay Area and began to perform spoken word, she won a spot on the San Francisco Slam Team (they won the Western Region Poetry Slam in 2000). From 1998 to 2008 she toured extensively as an independent artist. In 2001, she began to develop the hip-hop theater show Thieves in the Temple: The Reclaiming of Hip Hop, focused on fighting sexism and consumerism in hip-hop. She began her college teaching career at Stanford University in 2001. In 2006, she was chosen as the Director of June Jordan's Poetry for the People at UC Berkeley, where she currently teaches poetry and spoken word. She earned her Master of Fine Arts in fiction from Antioch University Los Angeles.

From 1995 to 2009, her work was published in various print journals and anthologies, including Essence Magazine.

In 2009, she stopped touring to start a family and transition to being a novelist. In 2013 she began to blog and to write for various online outlets, such as Harper's Bazaar, xojane, Bitch Magazine, Ebony, Racialicious, Writers Digest, Fusion, Womans Day, Movement Strategy Center, and The Feminist Wire. In 2014 she secured representation with literary agent Jenni Ferrari Adler of Union Literary in NYC. In 2015, she sold her debut book, a feminist heist novel with a Latina Robin Hood protagonist in a two-book deal to Kensington Books in New York. Her first novel, Uptown Thief, was published in 2016, the first of the "Justice Hustlers" series, which was optioned for TV. Aya was working on the pilot, but the production company did not survive the protracted writer's strike. In 2023, she was interviewed in the New York Times "By the Book." Aya is currently the Poet Laureate of Berkeley.

== Books ==
- puffy, 2013
- Uptown Thief, 2016
- The Boss, 2017
- The Accidental Mistress, 2018
- Side Chick Nation, 2019
- Equality Girls and the Purprle Reflecto-Ray, 2020 (self-published)
- A Spy In The Struggle, 2020
- Queen of Urban Prophecy, 2021
- The Mystery Woman in Room Three, 2021 (serially published)
- Undercover Latina, 2022
- Untraceable, 2023
- Undisclosed, 2025
