= Festivals of Thessaloniki =

The Festivals of Thessaloniki are a group of festivals held throughout the year in Thessaloniki, Greece.

== International Trade Fair ==
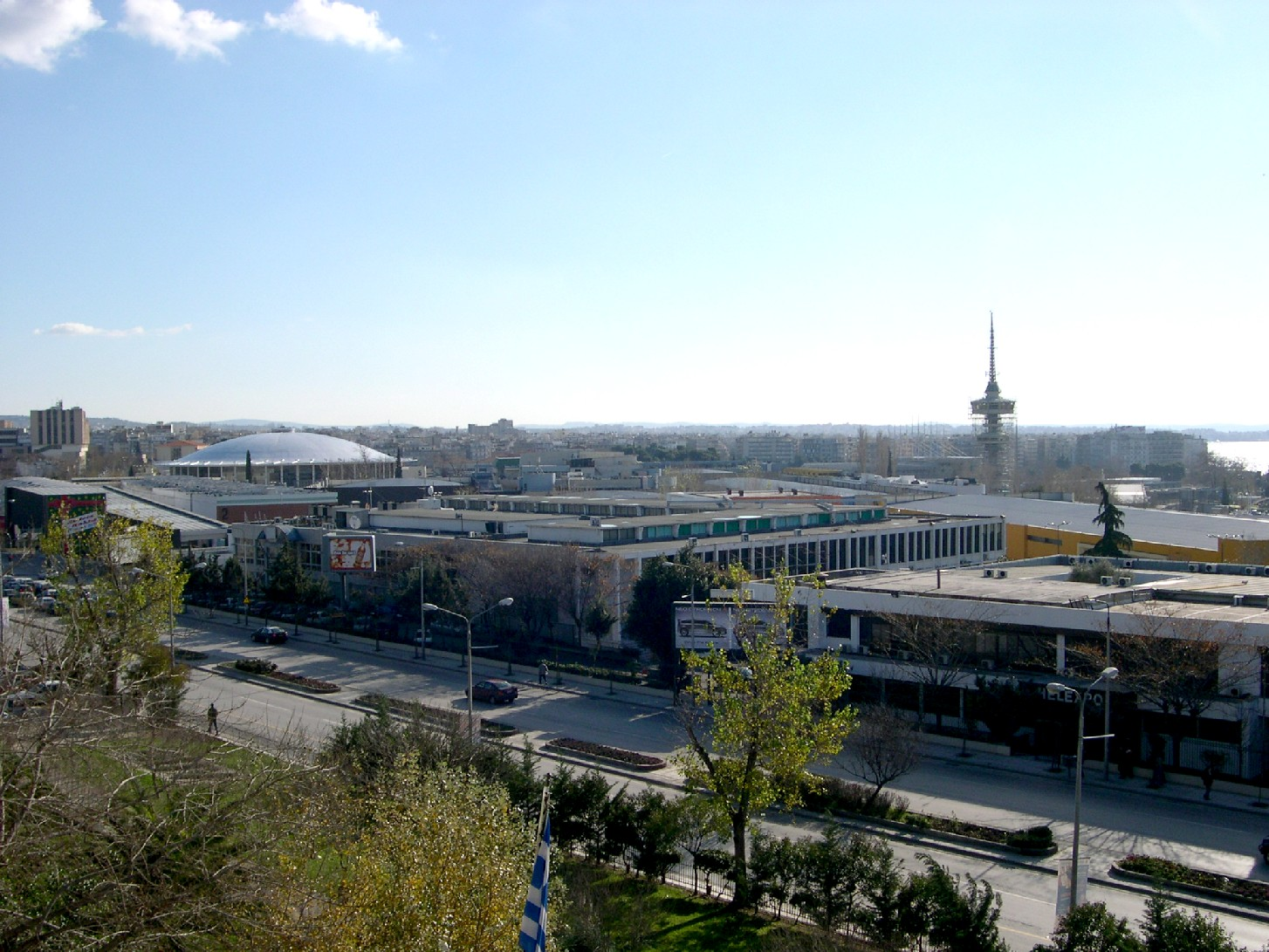
Thessaloniki International Fair

The Thessaloniki International Fair has a modern history dating to 1926. Hosted every September for 10 days at the 180,000 m² Thessaloniki International Exhibition Center, in the heart of the city, the fair is organised by HELEXPO, which also organises themed exhibitions and congresses throughout the year. The International Trade Fair is inaugurated by the Prime Minister and attended by more than 300,000 visitors every year.

== International Film Festival ==
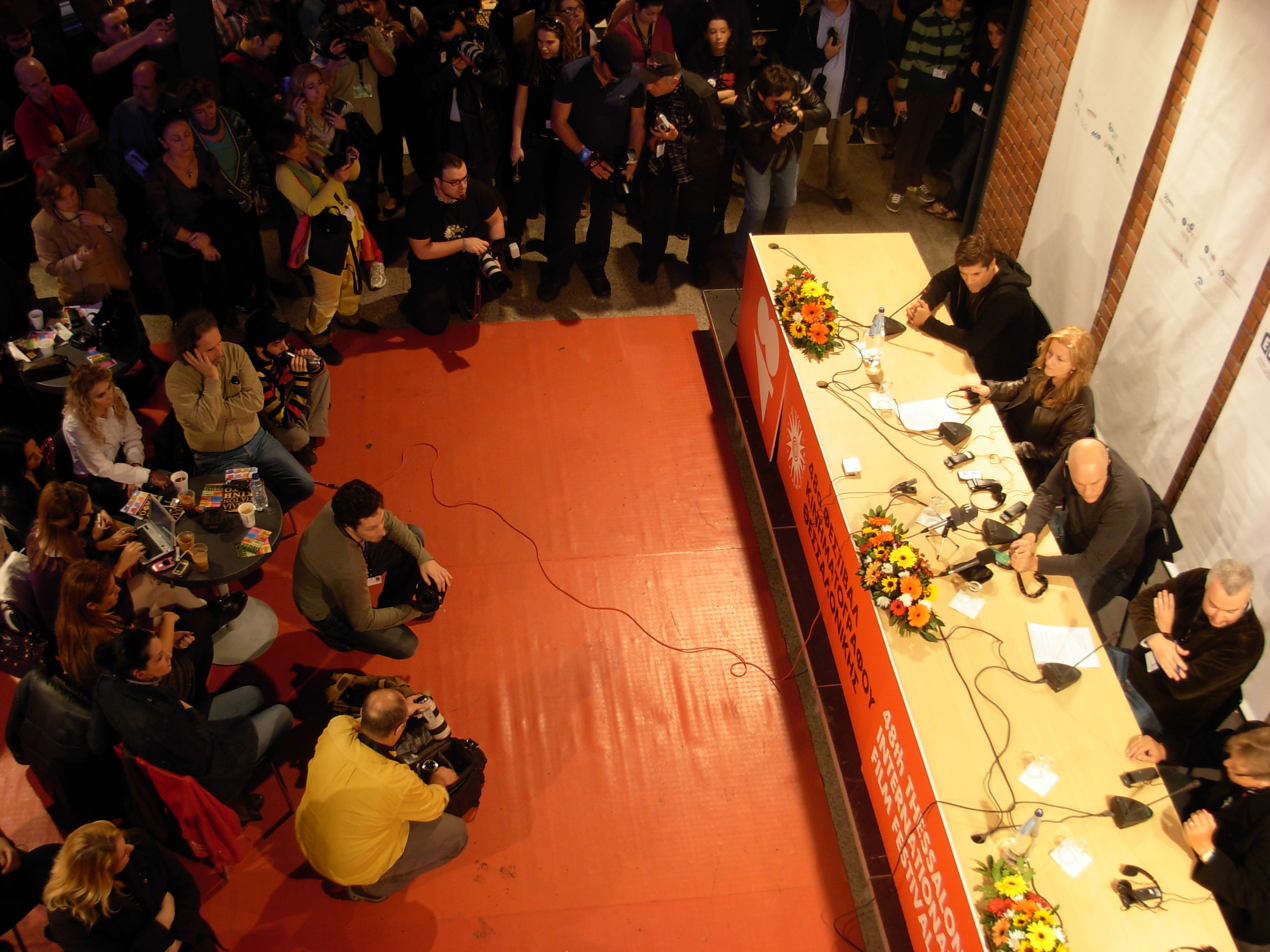
Conference with John Malkovich and former president of the Thessaloniki International Film Festival Georges Corraface

The Thessaloniki International Film Festival has become the primary showcase in Southeastern Europe for the work of new and emerging filmmakers, as well as the leading film festival of the region. The event features an International Section, its Panorama of Greek Film, the New Horizons program, the Balkan Survey, and numerous retrospectives and tributes to leading figures in the world of film. Since 1993, a succession of leading lights of international cinema, including Francis Ford Coppola, Faye Dunaway, Catherine Deneuve and Irene Papas, have visited the Festival.

=== Documentary Festival ===
The Thessaloniki Documentary Festival was launched in March 1999, inspired by Dimitri Elpides and benefiting from the local public's enthusiastic response, alongside extensive coverage in the local and international press. In 2005, 22,000 admissions were registered. The main programme focuses on documentaries that explore global social and cultural developments, and also now introduces a number of new side sections and events based on important works by new documentarists. Films from the main programme will be candidates for the FIPRESCI and also the Audience Awards.

The festival attracts a filmgoing public which rediscovers, year after year, images of the new century, new film ecritures, new directors, new technologies, but also representatives of the film world who find in it a reliable organisation appropriate for promoting their work. The event revolves around a sequence of unchanging sections: stories to tell, views of the world, the recording of memory, and portraits, but each year's programme is also supplemented with several others.

The Festival aims to the offer the filmgoing public annually gathering in Thessaloniki an exploration of the common images of the early 21st century, and to explore its human landscape through documentary.

== International Festival of Photography ==
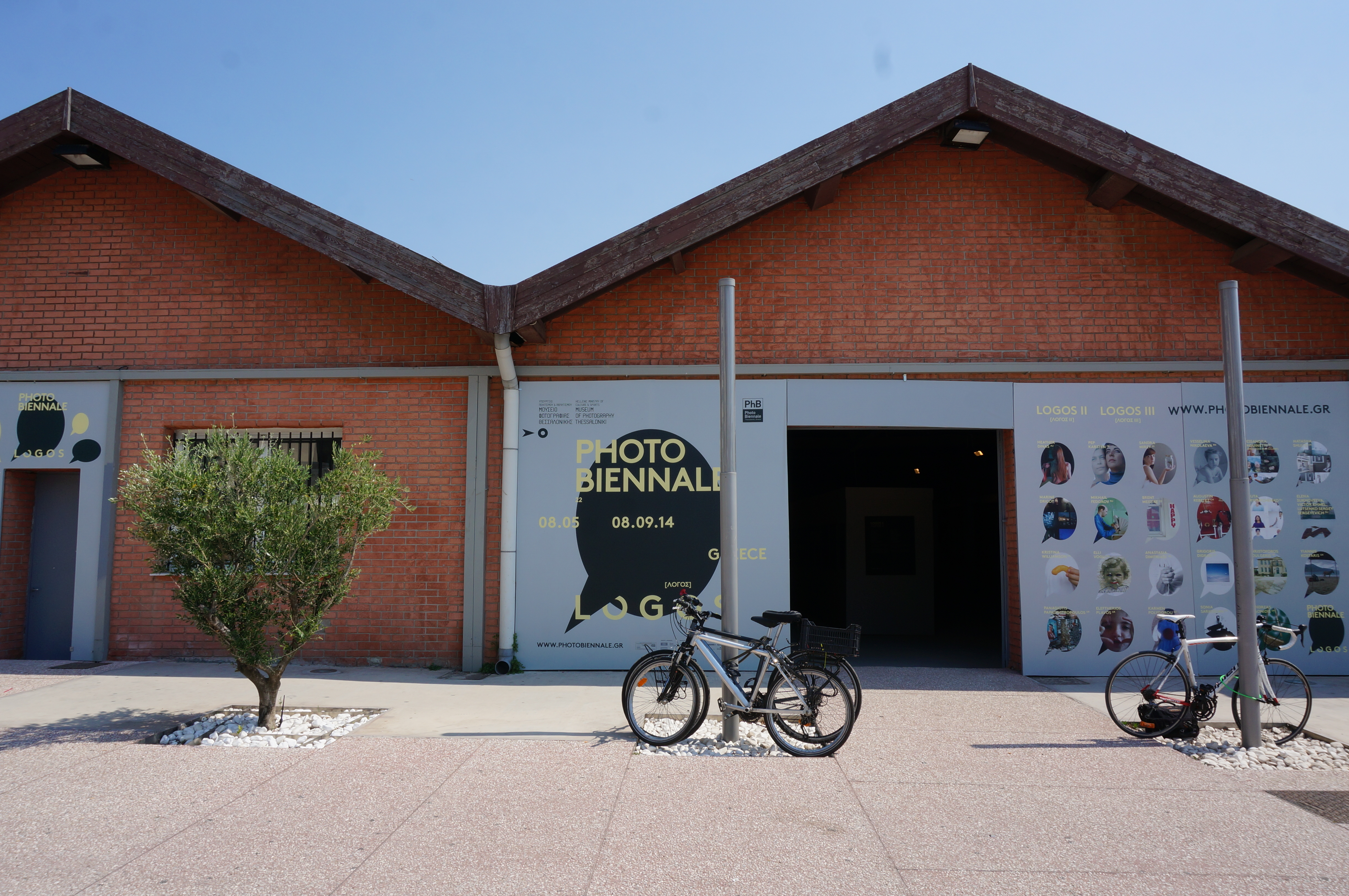
Museum of Photography

The Thessaloniki International Festival of Photography (Photosynkyria) takes place in Thessaloniki from February to mid-April of every year, attracting the interest of both the photographic world and the wider public, while also functioning as a meeting point for the Greek and the international photographic scene. Photosynkyria exhibitions and events are hosted in a variety of venues around Thessaloniki, including museums, heritage landmarks, galleries, bookshops and cafes.

Photosynkyria was launched in 1988 by photographer Aris Georgiou, and over the past five years has been organized by the Museum of Photography, which annually appoints the artistic director of the festival.

== Thessaloniki International Book Fair ==
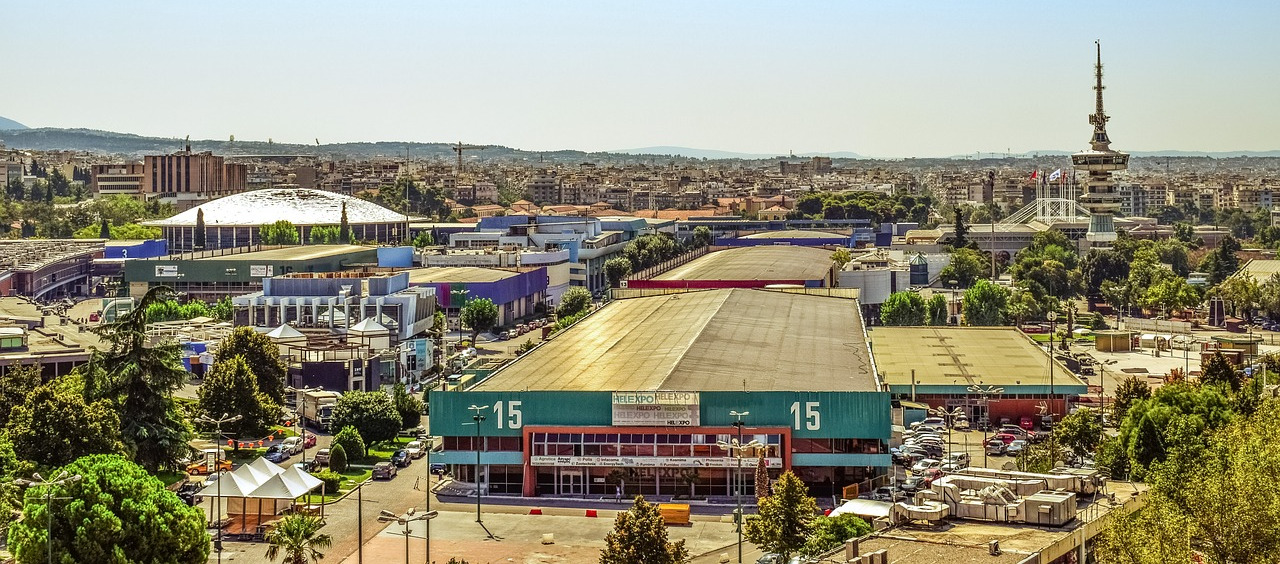
Thessaloniki International Exhibition Centre

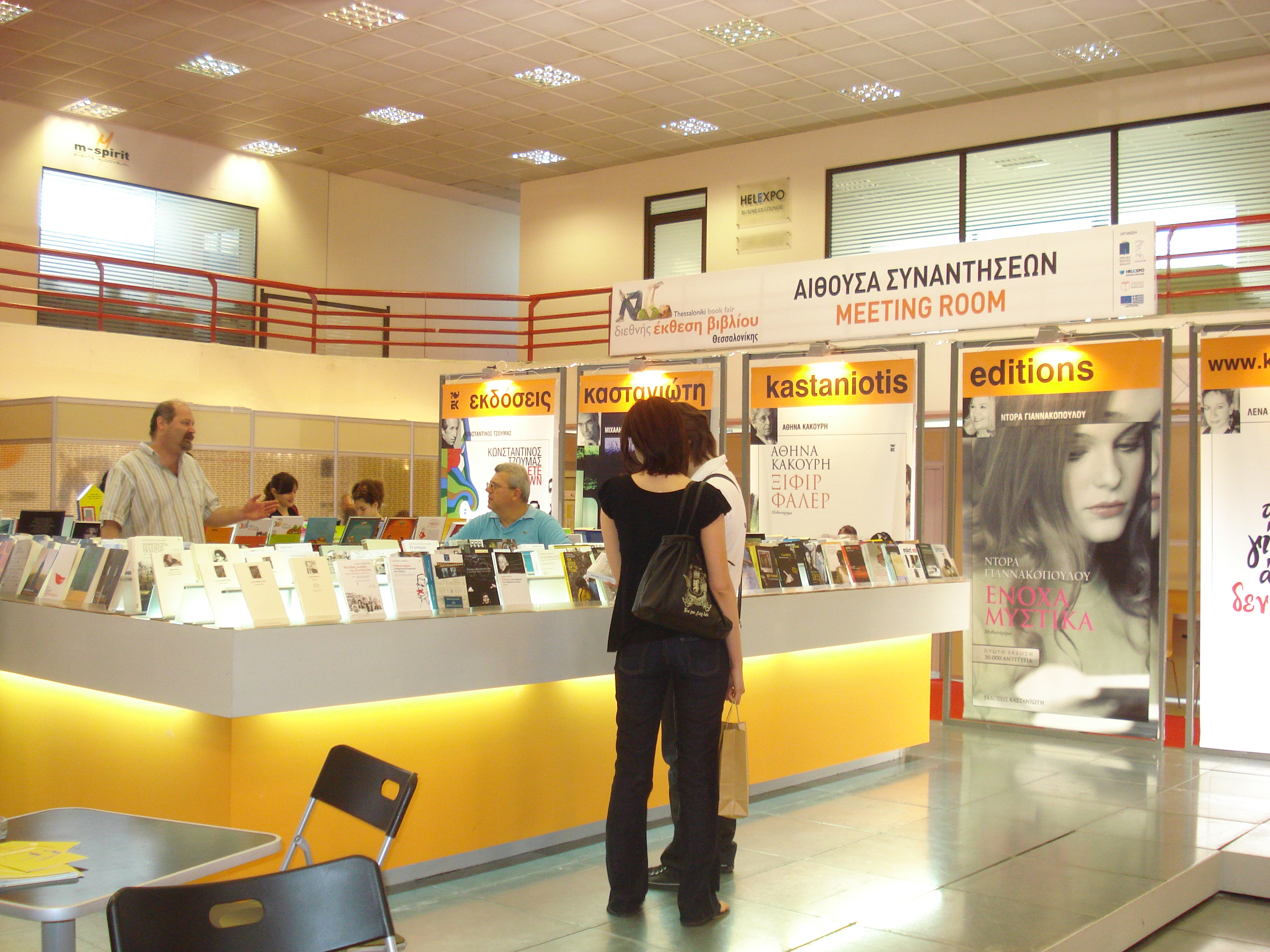
Snapshot from the International Book Fair (2020)

The TIBF began in 2003 and has grown is the leading cultural event for books in Greece, as well as to become a focal point for the book world in Greece and the wider Balkan and Mediterranean region.

== Dimitria ==
Thessaloniki Concert Hall

This three-month-long festival of cultural events has been held every September–December since 1966. Named after Agios Dimitrios (St. Demetrius), the patron saint of the city, it has become something of an institution for the city and very popular with the local population. It includes musical, theatrical, dance events, street happenings and exhibitions, and is organised and overseen by the Municipality of Thessaloniki, celebrating its fiftieth anniversary in 2015.

== Video Dance Festival ==
The Video Dance Festival started in 2000 at Thessaloniki as an international dance film festival, but soon widened to include additional experimental forms incorporating movement and the moving image.

== DMC DJ Championship ==
The Greek DMC DJ Championship is hosted in Thessaloniki at the International Trade Fair Of Thessaloniki.

DMC’s World DJ Championships, sponsored internationally by Technics and Ortofon, has grown over the years and the formats of its competitions have developed along with demand. Originally intended to be a DJ mixing battle, DJ Cheese introduced scratching in his routine in 1986, changing the course of future DMC battles.

The only equipment permitted in Technics' DJ Championships worldwide are Technics SL1200 turntables and the Technics EX-DJ1200 mixer; the DJs are allowed a period of exactly six minutes to perform.

== Thessaloniki Hip Hop Festival (THHF) ==
THHF (Thessaloniki Hip Hop Festival) is Greece's biggest HipHop & Underground Rap festivals and it's organised and promoted by Zoltan Tribe. THHF was foundered in 2003 and since then it has hosted world-famous artists as RA The Rugged Man (USA), DJ Vadim & Yarah Bravo (UK), Afu-Ra (USA), Foreign Beggars (UK), Lowkey (UK), Da Shogunz (NL), Snowgoons Soundsystem (DE), Freestyle (The Arsonists), Lerroy of the Saian Supa Crew (France), Wax Tailor (France), DJ Flip (ITF world), Zion I (USA), Zontanoi Nekroi, FF.C, Razastarr, Eisvoleas, Voreia Asteria, Ladose, Apexeis, Phase 3, Orthologistes, Psychodrama07, RNS, Sifu VERSUS, Sugahspank!, Professional Sinnerz, Rodes and many more.

== See also ==
- List of hip hop music festivals
- Hip hop culture
