= Blockfest =

Music festival in Finland

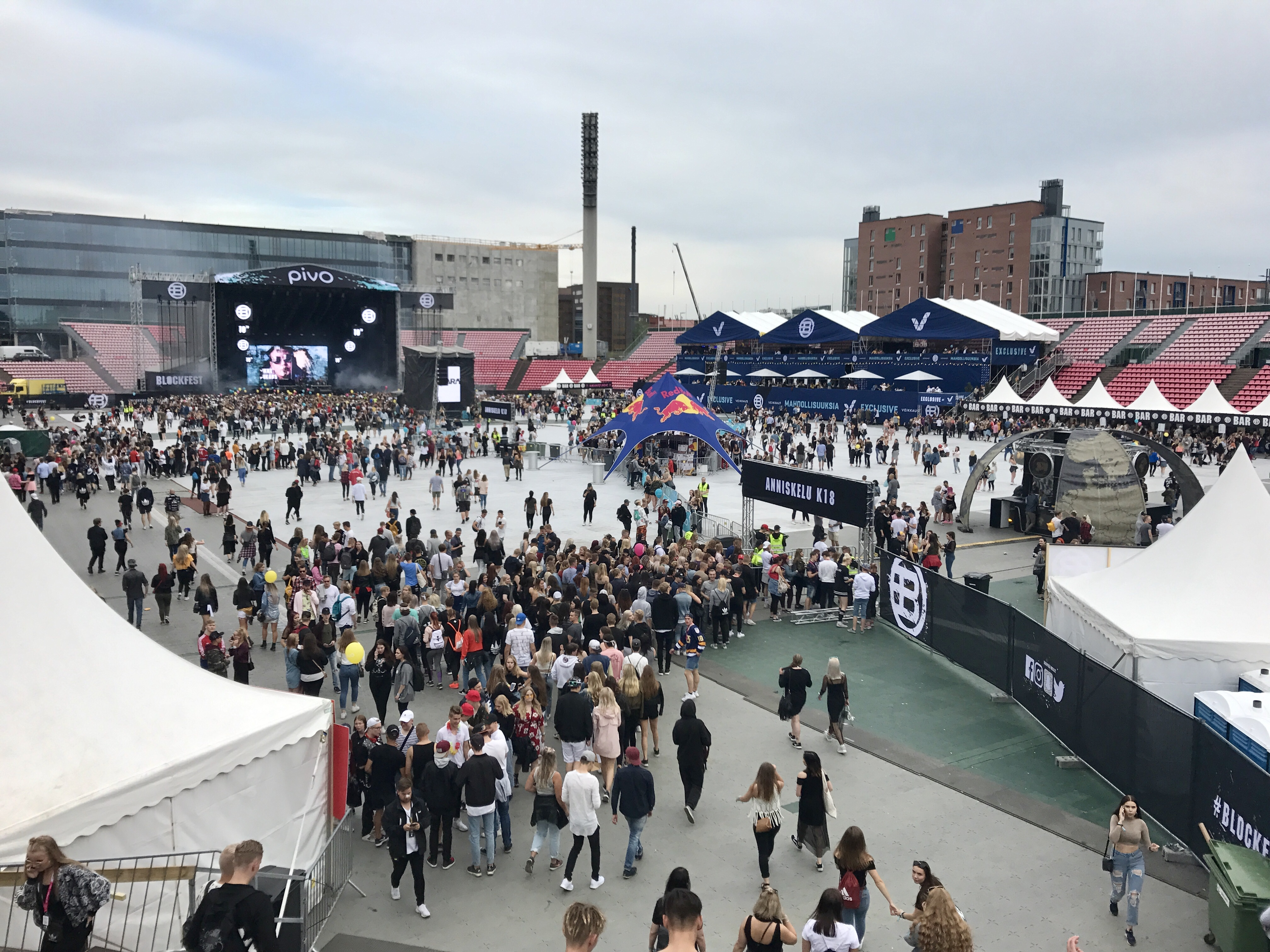
- View of the 2017 Blockfest in Tampere
- Genre: Hip hop
- Location: Tampere, Finland
- Years active: 2007–present
- Website: www.blockfest.fi/en/

Blockfest is an annual hip-hop festival held in Tampere, Finland. Normally held in August, the concert features hip-hop and R&B acts. In recent years, the event has been organized in the city center of Tampere, near Ratina Stadium, right next to Laukontori square and the Koskikeskus shopping center. Blockfest is one of the biggest hip-hop festivals in the Nordic countries and is sold out every year in advance.

Blockfest has been featured in JVG, Fintelligens, Cheek, Asa, Lord Est and Redrama. In addition, the festival has previously featured Wu-Tang Clan, Snoop Dogg, Ice Cube, Nas, ASAP Rocky, Wiz Khalifa, Post Malone, G-Eazy and 50 Cent.

Since celebrating its 10th anniversary in 2017, Blockfest payments are made with a payment wristband, which also serves as an entry wristband.

Blockfest announced in December 2019 an 18-year age limit for the 2020 Blockfest, which is still in place. The change to an age-restricted event caused outrage among young people.

As a result of the COVID-19 pandemic, the event was not organized in 2020. The 2021 event was also cancelled for the same reason.

== See also ==
- List of hip hop music festivals
- Hip hop culture
