= Fresh Island Festival =

Music festival near Novalja, Croatia

- Genre: hip hop, RnB, grime
- Dates: July/August
- Locations: Zrće beach, Novalja, Croatia
- Years active: 2012–present
- Website: www.fresh-island.org

Fresh Island Festival is a hip hop music festival held at Zrće beach near the city of Novalja in Croatia.

Founded in 2012 and usually held in mid-July the festival focuses primarily on hip hop culture along with R&B and grime. The festival takes place in three venues on Zrće beach: Aquarius, Papaya and Kalypso. It also offers daily boat parties and pool parties, excursions and extreme and water sports. Since 2012 Fresh Island has become the biggest hip-hop & urban beach festival in Europe featuring musicians, DJs and MCs from all over the world.

Festival dates for 2021 are yet to be confirmed.

The list of the previous performers include:

2012: Nas, Eve, DJ Muggs, DJ Revolution, Statik Selektah, DJ Shortee Blitz

2013: Snoop Dogg, Iggy Azalea, A$AP Rocky, KRS-One, Tony Touch, Statik Selektah

2014: Rick Ross, Method Man & Redman, Mobb Deep

2015: Action Bronson, Joey Badass, Pusha T, Danny Brown, Migos, Statik Selektah, JME, Stormzy, Tropkillaz

2016: Wiz Khalifa, Ty Dolla Sign, DJ Premier, Tim Westwood, Chris Brown, Kehlani, Shakka, Logan Sama

2017: French Montana, Sean Paul, Rae Sremmurd, Young Thug, Giggs, AJ Tracey

2018: Wiz Khalifa, J Hus, Vince Staples, GoldLink, Ty Dolla Sign, Lil Pump, Westwood, PartyNextDoor

2019: Tyga, Tory Lanez, Yxng Bane, Hardy Caprio, B Young, Gunna, Not3s, Stefflon Don

2020: Burna Boy, Wizkid, DaBaby, D-Block Europe, Westwood, DJ Semtex, Fivio Foreign

2021: To be confirmed

== See also ==
- Music in Croatia
- List of hip hop music festivals
