= List of hip-hop festivals =

List of hip hop festivals
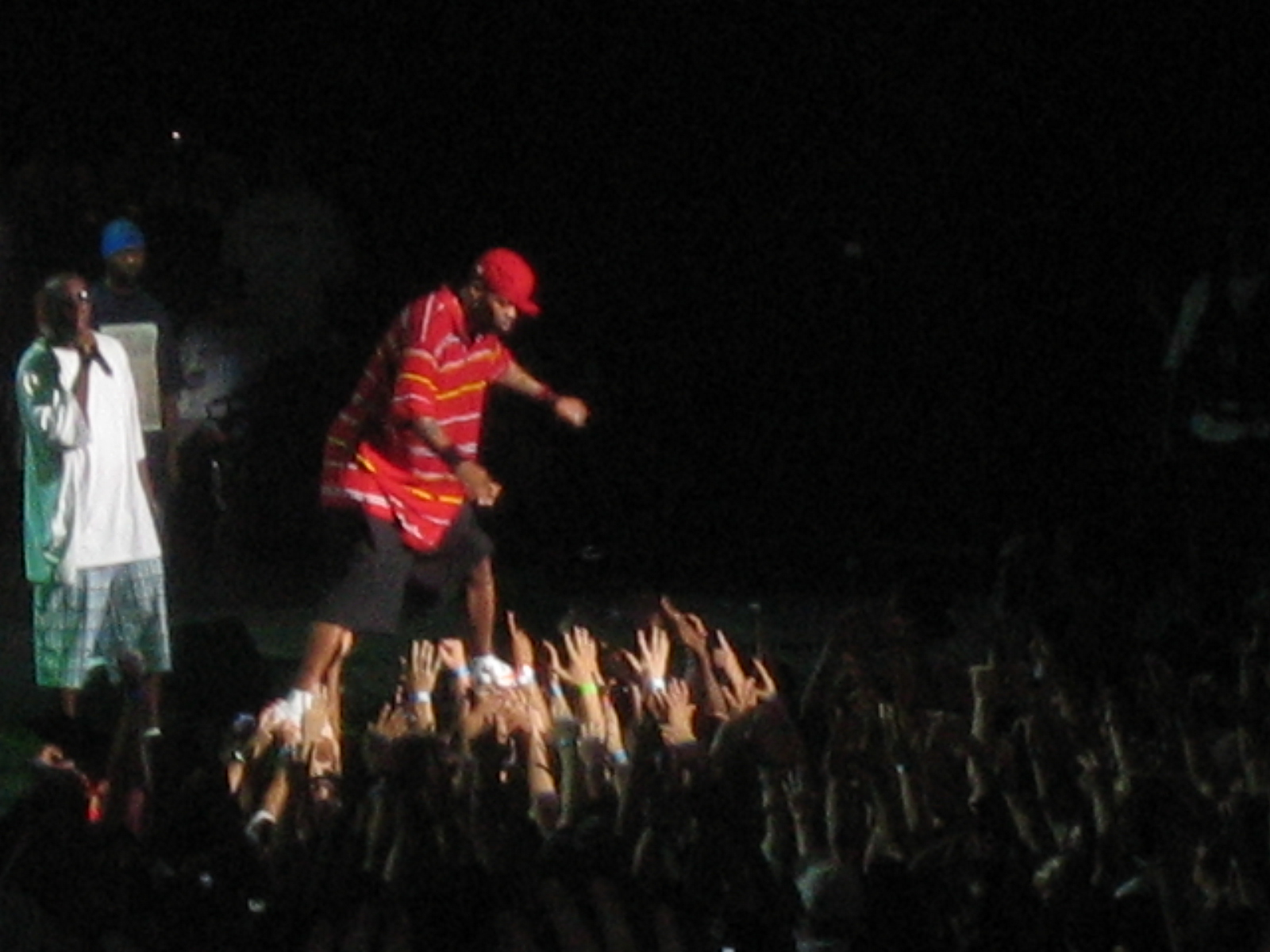

General Information
- Related genres: Hip-hop, funk, disco, dub, rhythm and blues, reggae, dancehall, toasting, performance poetry, neo soul, big beat, trap
- Location: Worldwide
- Related events: Concert tour, music festival, jazz festivals, electronic music festivals, reggae festivals, blues festivals, block party

The following is an incomplete list of hip-hop festivals, which encapsulates music festivals focused on hip hop music or other elements of hip-hop culture. Hip-hop, also called rap music, is a music genre consisting of a stylized rhythmic music that commonly accompanies rapping, a rhythmic and rhymin speech that is chanted.

== Festivals ==
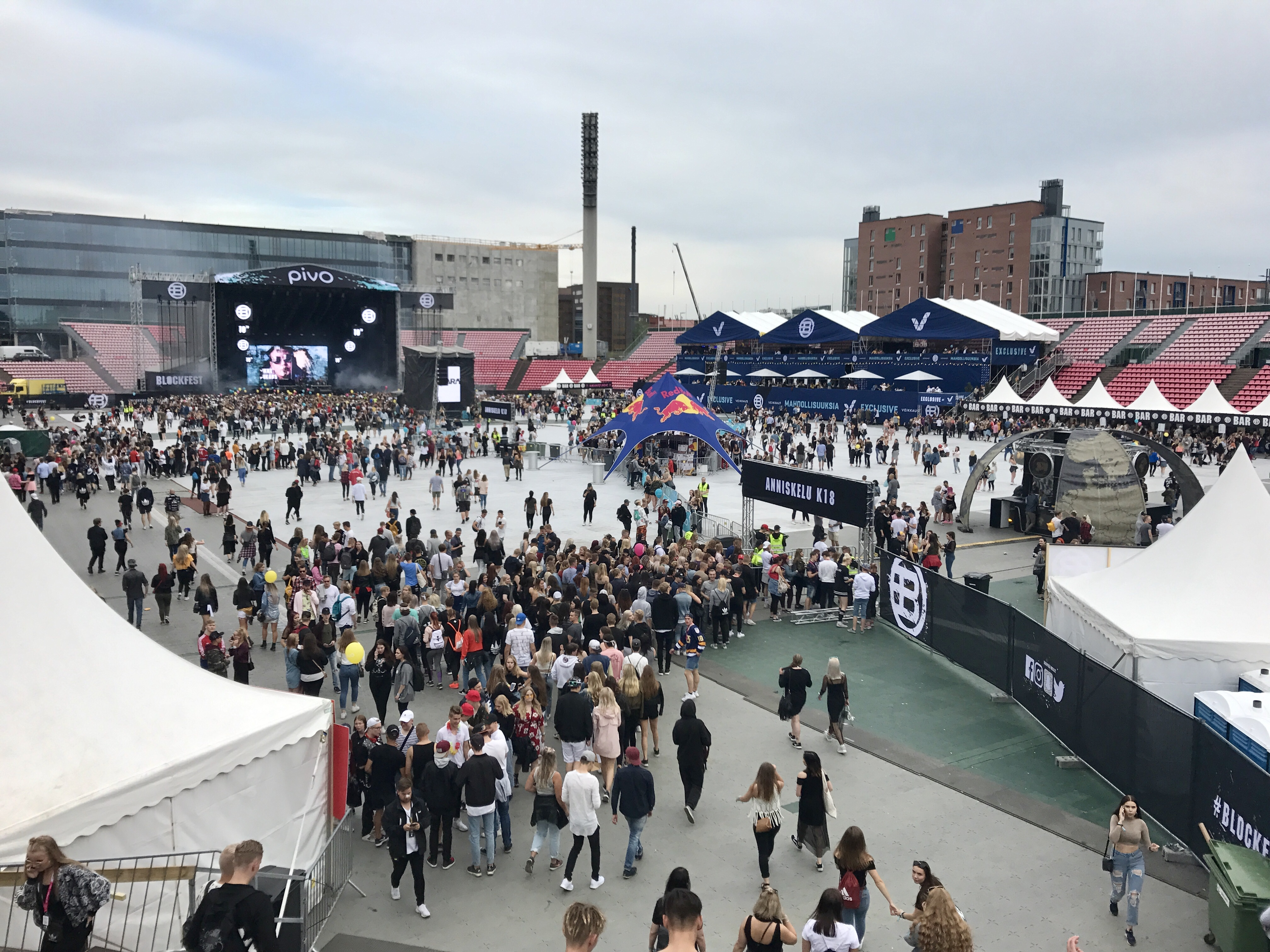
The annual Blockfest in Tampere, Finland is the largest hip-hop music event in the Nordic countries and also one of the best-selling festivals in advance. Picture of Blockfest in 2017.

The following is an incomplete list of both ongoing and defunct festivals.
Festival name	Location	Attendance	Years
Beach, Please! Festival	Costinești, Romania	260000	2022 - Present
Rolling Loud	United States; Australia; Canada; The Netherlands; Portugal; Thailand; Germany; Austria;	255000	2015 - Present
Essence Music Festival	New Orleans, Louisiana, United States	550000	1994–present
Les Ardentes Festival	Liege, Belgium	245000	2006–present
Cancun Jumpoff	Cancun, Mexico	12000	2003–present
Urban Beach Week	Miami, Florida, United States	400000	1990–present
Outside Lands Festival	San Francisco, California, United States	200000	2008–present
SF International HipHop DanceFest	San Francisco, California, United States	~4000	1999–present
Longitude Festival	Dublin, Ireland	40000	2013–present
Pemberton Festival	Pemberton, British Columbia, Canada	180000	2008–present
Royal Arena Festival	Orpund, Bern, Switzerland	20000	1999–present
Openair Frauenfeld	Frauenfeld, Switzerland	170000	1985–present
Governors Ball Festival	New York City, New York, United States	150000	2011–present
Made in America	Philadelphia, Pennsylvania, United States	140000	2012–present
Bonnaroo Music Festival	Manchester, Tennessee, United States	80000	2002–present
Couleur Café	Brussels, Belgium	72000	1990–present
Afropunk Festival	New York City, New York, United States	70000	2005–present
Blockfest	Tampere, Finland	10000	2005–present
Parklife	Prestwich, United Kingdom	70000	2010–present
Dour Festival	Dour, Belgium	225000	1988–present
2x2 Hip Hop Festival	Columbus, Ohio, United States		2015–present
Summer Jam	East Rutherford, New Jersey, United States	50000	1994–present
Lovebox	London, United Kingdom	50000	2002–present
Garorock Festival (pop, rock, electro and techno)	Marmande, France	160000	1997–present
#Plugfest	Silverston, South Africa	45000	2018–present
Southside	Tuttlingen, Germany	40000	1999–present
Big Day Out	Australia	31000	1992–2014
The Brooklyn Hip-Hop Festival	New York City, New York, United States	30000	2005–present
Soundset Music Festival	Minnesota, United States	30000	2008–present
Hip Hop Kemp	Hradec Králové, Czech Republic	20000	2002–present
Rock the Bells	United States	17000	2004–2013
Roots Picnic	Philadelphia, Pennsylvania, United States	70000	2008-present
Outlook Festival	Pula, Croatia	15000	2008–present
Lyricist Lounge	New York City, New York/Miami, Florida, U.S.	8000	1991–present
Scribble Jam	Cincinnati, Ohio, United States	7000	1996–2008
Paid Dues	United States	5000	2006–2013
Freaknik	Atlanta, Georgia		1982–2010
DMC World DJ Championships	Thessaloniki, Greece		1985–present
Waga Hip Hop Festival	Ouagadougou, Burkina Faso		1997–present
Hiphopplaya Festival	Seoul, South Korea	25000	2016–present
Coast 2 Coast Music Conference	Miami, Florida, United States	1000	2008–present
B-Boy Park	Tokyo, Japan		1999–present
Once Upon a Time in LA	Los Angeles, United States	2000	2021-present
Thessaloniki Hip Hop Festival	Thessaloniki, Greece		2003–present
Jingle Jam	Hartford, Connecticut, United States		2004–2008
Breakin' Convention	London, United Kingdom		2004–present
Hip Hop goes Theatre	Salzburg, Austria		2004–present
Trinity International Hip Hop Festival	Hartford, Connecticut, United States		2006–present
Young London into Music	London, United Kingdom		2009–present
Urban Street Jam	Irvine, California, United States		2010–present
No Major, No Problem	Los Angeles, California, United States		2015
Dooinit	Rennes, France		2010–present
Supafest	Australia		2010–2012
Fresh Island Festival	Novalja, Croatia		2011–present
Northern Touch Music Festival	Winnipeg, Manitoba, Canada		2017–present
A3C	Atlanta, Georgia, United States		2005–present
WooHah	Hilvarenbeek, Netherlands	32500	2014–present

== See also ==
- Hip-hop
- OVO Fest by Drake
- Portland Hip Hop Week

=== Related lists ===
The following lists have some or total overlap:

- Czech hip hop#Czech hip hop festivals
- List of music festivals
- List of jazz festivals
- List of reggae festivals
- List of electronic music festivals
