= Jingle Jam =

Hip-hop concert

Jingle Jam is the annual hip-hop concert held at the PeoplesBank Arena and sponsored by Hartford-based radio station Hot 93.7 (WZMX-FM). Held in December, the concert features the most popular acts that hip-hop and R&B have to offer in a particular year.

== 2019 Jingle Jam performers ==
- Megan Thee Stallion
- Saweetie
- Doja Cat
- Shenseea
- Snowsa

Lizzo was scheduled to perform but had to back out as she had the flu.

== 2008 Jingle Jam performers ==
- Paperboyz
- Ricky Blaze
- Slim of 112
- Jadakiss (with guests Styles P & Sheek Louch)
- Busta Rhymes (with guests Spliff Star & Ron Browz)
- T-Pain (with guest Busta Rhymes)
- T.I.

== 2007 Jingle Jam performers ==
- B5
- Bow Wow
- Cassidy
- The-Dream
- Hurricane Chris
- Mr Vegas
- T-Pain
- Trey Songz
- Soulja Boy Tell 'Em

== 2006 Jingle Jam performers ==
- Akon
- Cherish
- Ciara
- Elephant Man
- Jim Jones
- Lloyd
- Ludacris

== 2005 Jingle Jam performers ==
- Juelz Santana
- Sean Paul
- Tami Chynn
- Toxic

== 2004 Jingle Jam performers ==
- The Game
- Lady Saw
- Mario
- Slick Rick

== See also ==
- List of hip hop music festivals
- Hip hop culture
