= Urban Beach Week =

Hip-hop festival in Miami, Florida, US

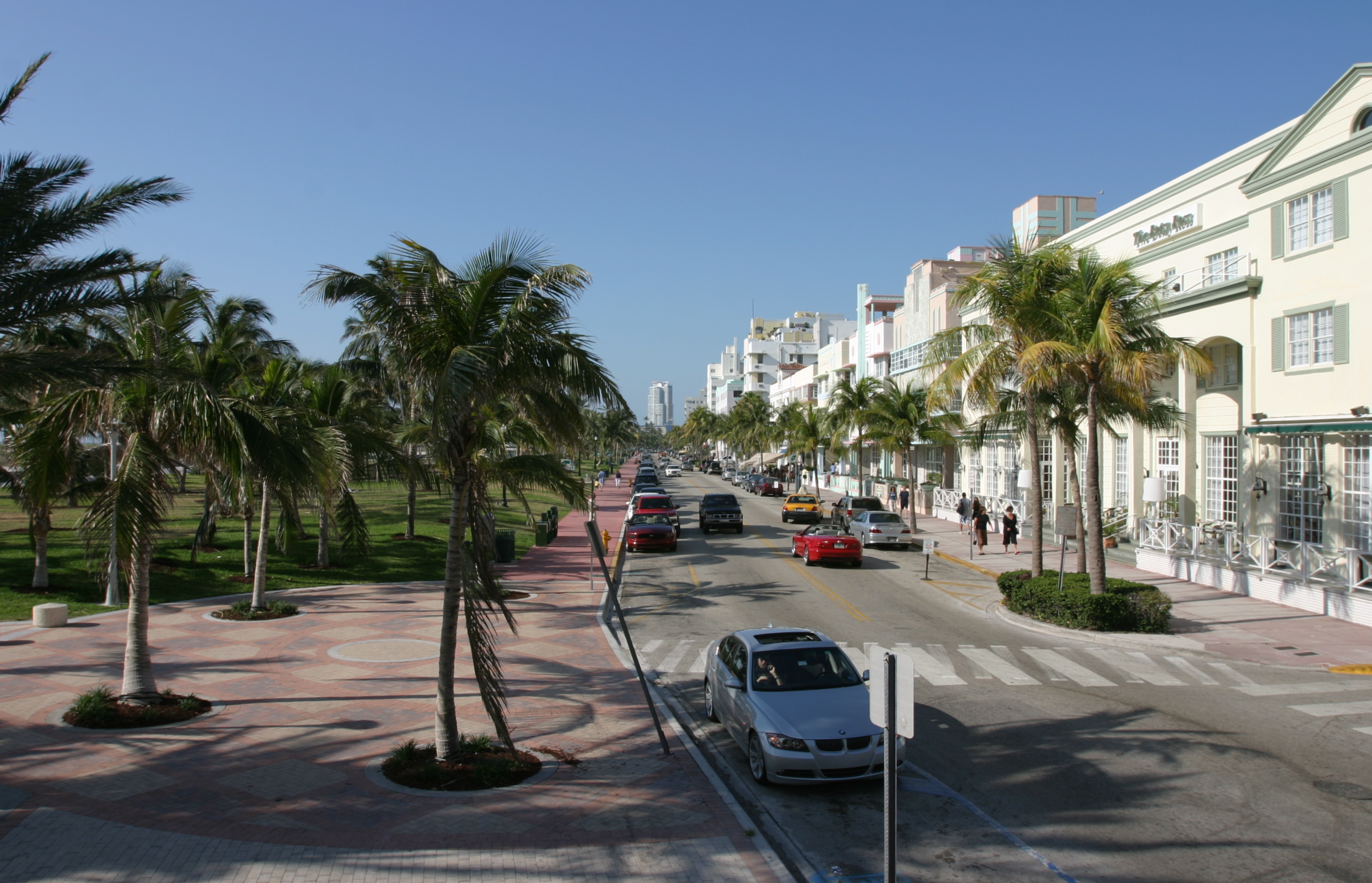
Clubs and music venues on and around Ocean Drive, South Beach are the center of Urban Beach Week's activities.

Urban Beach Week is a hip-hop festival held in Miami's South Beach over the Memorial Day weekend since the 2000s. Urban Beach Week has been likened to a de facto continuation of Freaknik's cultural activities. The event has become known for its over-the-top parties and fashions.

The events of Urban Beach Week are typically spread over five days. The city does not sponsor the event and there is no one organizer. Instead, it is a weekend of rolling performances in private venues.

== Visitor numbers ==
Estimates of those attending Urban Beach Week range from 250,000 to 350,000 visitors.

== Major artists ==
While Urban Beach Week is a hip-hop dominated music event, major reggae artists from the US and abroad have also appeared.

Major artists who have performed at Urban Beach Week related shows include Flo Rida, Twista, Mr. Vegas, Shaggy, Lil Bow Wow, Funkmaster Flex, Fat Joe, Marcia Griffiths, and Pitbull.

== Local politics ==
Urban Beach Week has been a controversial event for the residents of South Beach. Violence and property crime associated with the event has turned many locals against the festival. It was reported in the New York Times that many South Beach residents leave the area during Urban Beach Week.

Mayor Matti Herrera Bower has said the city doesn't have much ability to end Urban Beach Week, considering that the tourists who come for the Memorial weekend don't come for city permitted events, but for private concerts and parties.

=== Police response ===
After a fatal shooting of an armed suspect by police in 2011, city leaders considered cutting back drinking hours or imposing a curfew; both ideas were considered unworkable. Also rejected was a plan to make the festival a city-sanctioned and organized event.

Instead, the city and the Police Department increased the turnout of law enforcement in 2012, with a tougher stance on minor infractions. Nearly 600 officers were on duty. Lanes were closed on the causeways leading to Miami Beach, and license plate readers were used to check for outstanding warrants, stolen cars and suspended licenses. Watch towers were put up to better observe the main promenade on Ocean Drive.

Civil-rights groups expressed their concern in a letter signed by executive director of the ACLU of Florida, Howard Simon, former president of the Greater Miami ACLU chapter, John de Leon, and Bradford E. Brown, president of the Miami-Dade NAACP, which said that Miami Beach officials were attempting "to make this event as difficult as possible for visitors to attend, creating the appearance that it is trying to discourage African Americans from visiting the City."

A total of 431 arrests were made during the 2012 event. In 2012, police said that they removed 25 guns from the streets.

== See also ==
- List of hip hop music festivals
- Hip hop culture
- Black Bike Week, also on the Memorial Day weekend.
