= Breakin' Convention =

London hip-hop festival

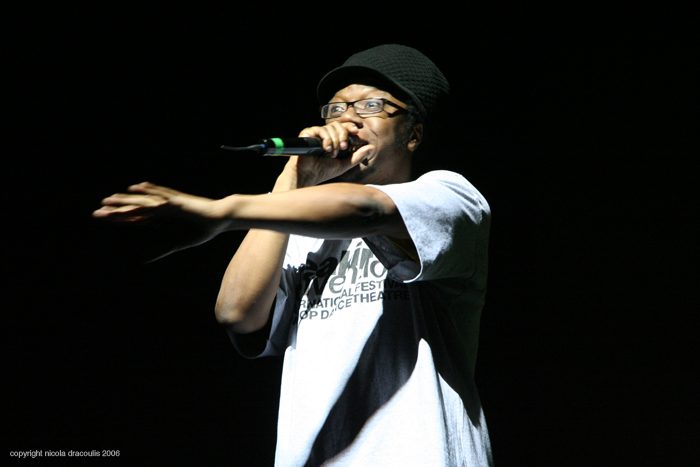
- Jonzi D at Breakin' Convention 2006.
- Location: Sadler's Wells Theatre, London, UK
- Founded: 2004
- Type of play: hip-hop theatre
- Festival date: every year in May
- Website: http://www.breakinconvention.com

Breakin' Convention is an international hip-hop theatre festival based in London, England that was founded in 2004 and is produced annually by Sadler's Wells theatre. It has been under the artistic direction of playwright and dancer Jonzi D since its inception. Since May 2008 Breakin' Convention has expanded its activity beyond the three-day festival to include tours across the UK, developing new theatre work with local hip-hop artists, and to produce year-round professional development courses for UK-based hip-hop choreographers, artists, and dance/theatre companies.

== Festival origin ==
Early in 2004, Jonzi D and recently appointed Artistic Director and Chief Executive of Sadler's Wells, Alistair Spalding, proposed the idea of a hip hop festival that took over the entire venue celebrating hip hop culture with an emphasis on dance. Jonzi D was appointed as an Associate Artist at the theatre in March 2005 and founded Still Brock Productions (later: Jonzi D Productions) to focus on education and professional development of hip hop dance in the UK. Breakin' Convention brought over early pioneers of the culture including The Electric Boogaloos, Tommy The Clown and Vagabond Crew, and introduced future award-winning companies such as ZooNation and Boy Blue Entertainment.

In 2023, Jonzi D won The De Valois Award for Outstanding Contribution (The Critics' Circle National Dance Awards).

Breakin' Convention is supported by Arts Council England.

== See also ==
- List of hip hop music festivals
- Hip hop culture
- Battle of the Year
- The Notorious IBE
