= Freaknik =

Annual festival in Atlanta, Georgia, US

Coordinates: 33°44′56″N 84°23′24″W

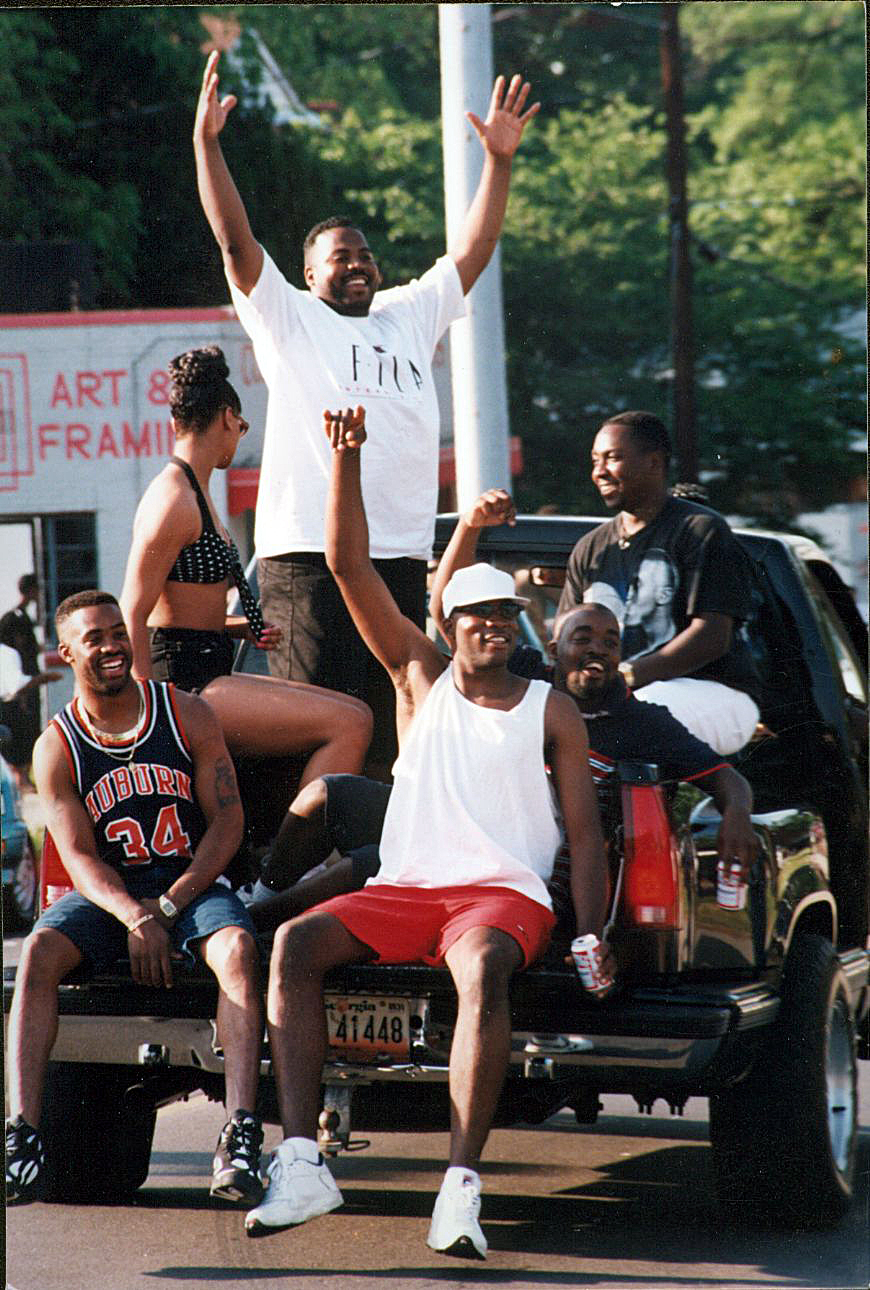
Photograph taken during Freaknik 1993

Freaknik (/ˈfriːknɪk/; originally Freaknic) was an annual spring break festival in Atlanta, Georgia. It was initially attended by students enrolled at historically black colleges and universities in the Atlanta University Center. It began in 1983 as a small picnic in a public park near the Atlanta University Center sponsored by the D.C. Metro Club for students who could not afford to return home for spring break. It continued as an annual event held during the third weekend in April. The event drastically increased in size and popularity in the 1990s, incorporating dance contests, concerts, parties, a basketball tournament, rap sessions, a film festival and a job fair. The 1990s were also the period when the event became known as a space where African-Americans could "get freaky" (sexually liberated in public). Early 1990s Freakniks were characterized as celebrations of black sexuality; however, by the mid-1990s, this dimension started to draw a crowd completely divorced from the original college demographic of the event, and the tone of the event shifted from celebration to concern over the sexual element getting out of control. From 1995 onwards, sexual violence at the event began to grow, and women's attendance dropped rapidly, contributing to the demise of the event in 1999.

The Atlanta magazine called it Atlanta's most infamous street party, while the New York Times has referred to as a "Black Woodstock". By 1999, Atlanta area police and elected officials were working together to end Freaknik. A revamped version returned for one day on June 22, 2019, as "FreakNik Atlanta '19 - The Festival" with a concert at Cellairis Amphitheatre at Lakewood.

Originally "Freaknic", the name of the event is a portmanteau of "picnic" and "freak", in accordance with the D.C. Metro Club's 1982–1983 theme "The Return of the Freak".

== History ==
=== Origins ===
Freaknik was conceived in March 1982 on Spelman College campus in a DC Metro Club meeting headed by then president Schuyla Goodson. It was sponsored by the club, which was composed of students from Washington, D.C., Maryland, and Virginia. The DC Metro Club intended for it to be a challenge to the California Club for the largest end-of-the-school-year party. Goodson suggested the name Freaknik (then spelt "Freaknic") as a portmanteau of freaky and picnic.

The name Freaknik was inspired by Le Freak by Chic, a popular song and dance from 1978. First held in John A. White Park in Atlanta in April 1982, it was attended by, at most, 150 students.

=== Early Years ===
In 1988, Spelman College President Johnnetta B. Cole banned the DC Metro Club from involvement with Freaknic for school liability reasons. With no chartered collegiate student organization presiding over the event, independent national promoter Daryl Miller was asked by the DC Metro Club to promote it. He grew the event from 15,000 to over 250,000 in five years with no radio nor television ads.

Several other promoters began promoting non-official Freakni(k) named events. One such event happened at the then 33-acre Lakewood Fairgrounds and had 60,000 people in attendance. In 1993, two non-HBCU students, party promoters Ronn Greene and Diya Nabawi, were the first to trademark the name, spelled officially as "Freaknik" (ending with a "k"). Another was held at Club XS off Moreland Ave. This event was promoted by a group of Kappa Alpha Psi fraternity members from Georgia Tech led by Guy Primus and with the help of Club XS owner Jeff Akbar and general manager Ed Rucker. It had an estimated 30,000 people in the parking lot and another 60,000 that cruised the Moreland all night.

=== Early to mid-1990s peak ===
In 1991, Kristina Copeland, a woman from Washington, D.C., and Ronn Greene, produced the second event, held at the Lakewood Fairgrounds. As the event became more popular in mainstream Black culture, a more diverse group of Black visitors from all regions of the United States, Canada, the Caribbean and Europe came to participate in it. Some of these visitors decided to make the Atlanta area their new permanent home. At its peak in the mid-1990s, the event attracted well over 250,000 people each year. Also the event was a major economic stimulus for the Atlanta area. It is estimated by 1994 the economic impact reached $20 million.

Freaknik reached its peak in the early to mid-1990s, when it evolved from a student gathering into a city-wide street festival attracting hundreds of thousands of attendees each spring. By 1993, crowds had reached around 100,000, and by 1994, attendance exceeded 200,000, with participants travelling from across the United States. The event spread across Atlanta’s streets, causing major traffic gridlock and effectively turning large parts of the city into an open-air party. The attraction for many attendees was less any specific event than the experience of cruising Atlanta's streets, encountering music, socialising in traffic, and being part of a vast, visible gathering of Black college students.

During this period, Freaknik became a major cultural hub, showcasing hip-hop artists such as Snoop Dogg, OutKast, The Notorious B.I.G., Queen Latifah, and Uncle Luke, while also shaping fashion, music, and youth culture. Record labels, including Jermaine Dupri's So So Def, began treating Freaknik as a marketing opportunity, and artists such as Luther Campbell of 2 Live Crew were booked for concerts associated with the weekend. Freaknik reinforced Atlanta’s emergence as a centre of Black cultural and economic life, offering an alternative to predominantly white spring break destinations. However, the scale of the event also brought increasing challenges, including logistical strain, public disorder, and growing reports of crime, which contributed to heightened scrutiny from authorities and residents.

=== 1996 Olympics, backlash against Freaknic, and demise in 1999 ===
As Freaknik grew, local homeowners' and business owners' attitudes toward it became negative. Restaurants announced closures, some hotels refused reservations, and Atlanta's Dogwood Festival was rescheduled for the first time since 1936. Six hundred residents and businesses formed the Freaknik Fallout Group and threatened legal action. The city tripled its security budget to $1 million, blocked highway exits, erected barricades, and enlisted university presidents to discourage student attendance. Despite these measures, 100,000 people still arrived. Additionally, reports for sexual assault of women, public indecency, and other public safety concerns increased when the event was active. By 1995, public safety concerns intensified, with reports of rising crime, including an estimated 2,000 criminal incidents that year. That year saw a sharp increase in reported violence: the rape unit at Grady Memorial Hospital treated ten victims over the weekend, police made 93 arrests, stores were looted in Underground Atlanta and Greenbriar Mall, and three people were shot. Residents responded by leaving the city during the event, businesses shut down, and police significantly increased resources, including allocating $300,000 in overtime and coordinating multi-agency responses.

The approach of the 1996 Olympic Games in Atlanta marked a turning point in the trajectory of Freaknik, as city authorities faced increasing pressure to present a controlled and orderly image to an international audience. In the years leading up to the Olympics, concerns about large crowds, traffic congestion, and reports of crime led officials, businesses, and civic groups to push for stricter regulation of the event. This resulted in increased policing, organized alternatives to the festival, and campaigns aimed at discouraging attendance. By 1996, with millions of visitors expected for the Olympics, the city adopted more aggressive measures to limit Freaknik’s scale and visibility, prioritizing economic interests and global reputation over the continuation of the informal street festival. Road closures, heightened law enforcement presence, and restrictions on movement disrupted the event’s traditional format, reducing its accessibility and altering its atmosphere. These actions reflected a broader shift in policy, as officials sought to curb what had come to be seen as an unmanageable and reputational risk.

Under continued pressure, Atlanta Mayor Bill Campbell further cracked down on Freaknik in April 1997. A much larger police presence created tension and discomfort among the almost entirely black festival goers. Roadblocks were placed at freeway exits that led to Atlanta. The city posted nearly 300 "No Cruising Zone" signs and introduced one-way street measures. A commercial website, freaknik.com, drew 13 million pageviews in the lead-up to the event. 1997's gathering was widely described as subdued, though it was marked by two significant incidents: the filmed beating and pepper-spraying of a local man, Timmie Sinclair, by police at a traffic barricade, which sparked civil rights protests; and serious disruption to a 10,000-person hardware industry convention, prompting threats to cancel future Atlanta events worth an estimated $18 million.

After city leaders took these measures to curtail Freaknik's accessibility, its popularity faded. The event moved east from Atlanta to Memorial Drive in DeKalb County, Georgia.

By 1998, negative media coverage had intensified, driven by reports of serious criminal incidents, including sexual assault, shootings, and more than 400 arrests during the event. Civic and business leaders formally called for its closure, citing public safety concerns and reputational damage to Atlanta.

By 1999, despite moving to DeKalb County to avoid Atlanta police, attendance declined. The year's attendance dropped to approximately 50,000, a significant decrease from the more than 200,000 recorded at its peak. Law enforcement issued thousands of citations and made hundreds of arrests, reflecting a heavily policed environment. This combination of declining turnout, strict enforcement, and sustained opposition marked the end of Freaknik in its original form, with the 1999 event widely regarded as its final iteration.

There were attempts after 1999 to revive Freaknik, but they were unsuccessful. In April 2010, Atlanta officials said: "there are no permitted Freaknic-related events inside the city limits." Atlanta Mayor Kasim Reed also said that "he will be tough and even sue organizers of any Freaknic-related activities who violate city guidelines."

=== 2019 Reunion ===
After 20 years, the last official Freaknik being in 1999, Atlanta-based promotion company After 9 Partners and Carlos Neal contracted Luther Campbell, Juvenile, Trina and others to spearhead a Freaknik themed concert on a Saturday in June 2019. The 2019 Freaknik featured hip-hop and R&B music artists performing at the Cellairis Amphitheatre. Other activities were held in conjunction with the event such as a community service event. Many of the estimated 20,000 attendees were older adults who participated in the official Freakniks of the 80s and 90s.

== Sexual element ==
In African-American Vernacular English, to get "freaky" means to act sexually liberated. Although Freaknik did not start out with an explicit sexual dimension, the inclusion of the word "Freak" in the name eventually added that element. By the late 1980s, public dancing, revealing clothing, and flirtatious behaviour were widely reported at Freaknik, and the event developed a reputation for uninhibited celebration. This environment was reinforced by hip-hop culture, music videos, and amateur recordings, which often emphasized sexualized imagery and contributed to Freaknik’s national profile.

As the event grew further in the mid-1990s, this sexualized atmosphere intensified and became more commercialized and performative. Women were frequently filmed, photographed, or encouraged to dance in sexually explicit ways in public spaces. In some cases, men paid women to expose themselves or perform for cameras, and the presence of camcorders contributed to a culture of voyeurism. This dynamic blurred the line between consensual participation and coercion.

At the same time, reports of sexual harassment and assault increased. Women described being groped, surrounded, or pressured in crowded street environments. By 1995, sexual violence had become a recognized issue, with multiple rapes reported, though these figures were widely believed to be undercounts. The broader culture of the event, including heavy drinking, large crowds, and limited policing in earlier years, contributed to conditions in which such incidents could occur.

By the late 1990s, sexual violence had become one of the central concerns associated with Freaknik. Documented incidents included rape, sexual assault, and widespread non-consensual touching, alongside footage showing groups of men forcibly interacting with women in public. The decline in female attendance by 1999 was identified as a direct consequence of these risks, with officials noting that many women avoided the event due to safety concerns.

Contemporary commentary and media coverage often minimized or misrepresented these incidents, at times portraying women as responsible for their own victimization or framing the behavior as part of the festival’s culture. However, later analysis has emphasized that these patterns reflected broader societal issues around gender, consent, and the treatment of women, rather than being unique to Freaknik alone. Candice Frederick, writing for HuffPost in 2023, characterized Freaknik as a space where Black sexual expression and liberation became highly visible and mainstreamed during the 1990s, shaped by a wider pop culture moment that embraced eroticism in music, film, and literature. She described the event as an environment of overt public sexuality, where attendees engaged in sexualized dancing, revealing clothing, and exhibitionist behavior, often framed by participants as expressions of freedom, pleasure, and identity. However, she argued that this apparent liberation was deeply contested and constrained by misogyny and rape culture. Victim-blaming attitudes and the normalization of harassment undermined women’s autonomy, while male entitlement shaped how sexual expression was received. As a result, she argues Freaknik exposed a contradiction between the idea of Black female sexual freedom and the reality of unequal and often unsafe conditions in which that freedom was exercised.

== In culture ==
Williams Street Studios produced a one-hour special spoof titled Freaknik: The Musical based on the popular festival. The show aired on television network Adult Swim in March 2010.

A season two episode of Popular features the character Mary Cherry saying "I went to Freaknik in hotlanta and turned the mother out" when grilled on her spring break activities.

A season one episode of True Life followed college students during 1998's Freaknik.

A season six episode of Sister, Sister chronicled Tia and Tamera's trip from Michigan to Atlanta toward Freaknik with their college friends.

In his mixtape "STN MTN / Kauai", Childish Gambino opens by saying that he had a dream that he ran Atlanta, and among other things, he would bring back Freaknik.

On "Hair Day", the eleventh episode of season six of the ABC series Black-ish, Dre reveals to his son Jack that as a younger man he was beaten in a dance-off by a someone who brought his own whistle to the party, which raised the ire of his oldest son, Junior, who insisted Dre had told him "What happens at Freaknik stays at Freaknik."

Tom Wolfe referenced Freaknik/Freaknic in his book "A Man in Full" - initially around page 17, chapter "Chocolate Mecca" but other places as well.

Freaknik is referenced in rap songs from the 1990s and early 2000s.

Beyoncé references Freaknik 1996 in her song “THIQUE,” which was released on Renaissance in 2022.

Hulu released a documentary called Freaknik: The Wildest Party Never Told. in March 2024.

Abbott Elementary Season 6, Episode 4 ("Halloween Party") Mr. Johnson delivers a legendary line about his chaotic past, claiming he knows how to party because he used to frequent the Playboy Mansion, Studio 54, and Freaknik.

== See also ==
- Freaknik: The Musical
- Urban Beach Week, successor event
- Magic City (club)
- Diddy parties

General:

- African Americans in Atlanta
- Black mecca
- List of hip hop music festivals
