= National Bikers Roundup =

Annual motorcycle rally in Missouri, US

- Genre: Motorcycle rally
- Date: August
- Frequency: Annual
- Locations: Kansas City, Missouri
- Years active: 39
- Inaugurated: 1977
- Participants: 30,000–40,000
- Patrons: Dallas Thibodeaux & Rozell Nunn, jnr
- Website: www.nationalbikersroundup.org

The National Bikers Roundup is the largest camping motorcycle rally in the United States and is organized by a group of African American motorcycle clubs. Its location changes every year but every decade it returns to its founding city of Kansas City, Missouri. More than 1,000 motorcycle clubs attend the event and black women make up close to half of participants.

== History ==
First organized in 1977 by Dallas Thibodeaux and Rozell Nunn, Jnr attracting 49 riders, it has since grown to a five-day event, with up to 30,000 participants, who enjoy camping, exhibition, parades, stunt shows, entertainment and a host of other motorcycle-related experiences including drag racing and a "biggest gut contest".

The event serves to unite the Black motorcycle community and promote camaraderie. Starting from 1998, each year participants donate food and money to support local food paid programmes. By 2000, donations had reached 16,000 tonnes and $9,000.

Due to the history of racial segregation in the US, the event was largely ignored by the media and motorcycle industry for most of its history but is now supported by manufacturers such as Honda and Harley-Davidson, which was the first major company to attend, and is both family friendly and open to all ethnicities.

== Media coverage ==
The Tulsa World featured coverage of the 2014 Rally in Tulsa, Oklahoma, held July 30 to August 3.
