= Winley Records =

Former American doo-wop record label

Paul Winley Records Inc. (more commonly credited as Winley Records) was a doo-wop record label founded in 1956 that, in 1979, became one of the earliest hip hop labels. It was situated on 125th Street, Harlem, New York City. Winley released doo-wop by The Paragons and The Jesters, and hip hop records by Paul Winley's daughters, Tanya and Paulette, produced by Winley's wife, Ann. The label can lay claim to a number of firsts: one of the earliest rock and roll compilations, one of the earliest breaks compilations, an early solo female rap artist and an early instance of social commentary in rap. Winley was also the first label to record one of hip hop's most important figures, Afrika Bambaataa.

== Paul Winley ==
Paul Winley entered the music business through writing songs for his brother's Washington D.C. doo-wop group, The Clovers. Through them, he met Ahmet Ertegün, who—unusually for a label mogul—himself wrote for The Clovers subsequent to signing them. Winley moved to New York City to work with Ertegün's Atlantic Records, where he wrote for Ruth Brown and Big Joe Turner. He then became one of the songwriters working in and around the Brill Building in the 1950s, along with figures he met and knew there such as Otis Blackwell and Jesse Stone. Winley formed a songwriting partnership with Davey Clowney, better known as Dave "Baby" Cortez, and the two began recording doo-wop groups for the newly founded Winley Records.

== Doo-wop ==
Winley Records first recorded "Baby" Cortez, and then Little Anthony as part of The Duponts: "You"/"Must Be Falling in Love" (1955, technically predating the record company itself). Then came The Jesters, students at Cooper Junior High School in Harlem who graduated from singing under an elevated train station near 120th Street to the amateur night contest at the Apollo, where Paul Winley discovered them. The Jesters' B-sides often rivaled the lead cut. Their first three singles were all arranged by Clowney, and all three—"So Strange"/"Love No One But You", "Please Let Me Love You"/"I'm Falling in Love" (both 1957) and "The Plea"/"Oh Baby" (1958)—made the outer reaches of the national pop chart, and generated considerable New York interest. Under a different line-up, The Jesters reached No. 110 on the Billboard chart in 1960 with a version of The Diablos' "The Wind" backed with "Sally Green". Two lesser singles followed: "That's How It Goes"/"Tutti Frutti" (1960) and "Uncle Henry's Basement"/"Come Let Me Show You How" (1961).

A brother group to The Jesters, and "equally fine", were The Paragons—"real hoodlums, real zip-gun, street-warring hoodlums", Paul Winley recalled to David Toop in 1984, "but at the time I was young and crazy myself, so it didn't make any difference". For Winley, they recorded "Florence" backed with "Hey Little Schoolgirl" (1957), "Lets Start All Over Again" with "Stick With Me Baby" (1957), the ballad "Two Hearts Are Better than One" with "Give Me Love" (1957), "Twilight" plus "The Vows of Love" (1958), and "So You Will Know"/"Don't Cry Baby" (1958). Then came their backing of Tommy Collins on "Doll Baby"/"Darling I Love You" (1959), as The Paragons alone on the re-cap "So You Will Know"/"Doll Baby" (1960) and recording under the name Mack Starr and the Paragons for their last Winley release, "Just A Memory"/"Kneel and Pray" (1961). Of these, the records "Florence" and "Let's Start All Over Again" are doo-wop classics, and "Twilight" a "New York mini-classic". Jay Warner is of the opinion that the obscure "So You Will Know" is a finer record even than these.

The Paragons Meet The Jesters, originally released by Jubilee in 1959, with its street gang cover and vocal duels inspired by doo-wop's street corner singing battles and live show group competitions, was "one of the first rock and roll compilation LPs", and the most commercially successful doo wop compilation ever released. Hal Winley reformed The Clovers for Winley in 1961 and in that year recorded "Wrapped Up in A Dream"/"Let Me Hold You", "Be My Baby"/"They're Rockin' Down The Street" and "I Need You Now"/"Gotta Quit You" on the label. Other releases of this period include those of Charley White (of The Clovers), "Nobody's Fault But Mine" (1958), and Ann Fleming (Ann Winley), "Jive Time Baby" (1960). Relic Records have collected Winley doo-wop on The Best of Winley Records (RELIC 5019) with liner notes by Donn Fileti detailing their lo-fidelity, almost ad hoc independent approach creating a valuable and unique New York sound. Quoting Fileti, David Toop makes the point that these are comments that can equally apply to Winley's hip hop output. Winley Records released an expanded The Paragons Meet The Jesters Deluxe Edition in 2011 as Winley Records 3068–02. This re-release not only contained 31 cuts (with alternate takes and session talk) but appears to have been mixed from the original session tapes.

== Hip hop ==
Winley Records resurfaced in the 1970s, with a series of releases which—like the street corner practices of doo-wop foreshadowing those of hip hop—would in their different ways presage the advent of commercially recorded hip hop, even as that movement blossomed in the Bronx and spread to the streets of Harlem. Winley released a series of speeches by Malcolm X, tied into a tradition of black oratory and to be sampled a decade later by Public Enemy and others. The label also recorded Harlem Underground Band (featuring a young George Benson), whose "Smokin' Cheeba Cheeba" (1976), from the album Harlem Underground furnished a "break" for hip hop's burgeoning breakbeat culture. A "break" was a short percussive passage in a record which hip hop DJs would loop (using two copies, one for each turntable) in order for it to be rapped over and/or danced to. By the late 1970s, "b-boy" sections were appearing in some small New York record stores, catering to "b-boys", followers of this yet-to-be-named new subculture, who would buy 45s, 12"s or complete albums, old or new, of funk, rock or indeed any genre, as long as they were satisfied that each contained at least a few seconds worthy of being looped. Paul Winley's daughter Tanya "Sweet Tee" Winley was such a follower; a "rap fanatic," according to her father. Paul began collecting songs containing popular breaks and compiling them on a series of unofficial records called Super Disco Brake's, beginning in 1979 and eventually running to six volumes. The first of these therefore was one of the earliest records released with hip hop culture in mind, and probably the first breakbeat record in history.

Harlem Underground Band, augmented with the organ of the seemingly ever-present "Baby" Cortez, functioned as the house band backing Winley's hip hop releases, hence having the same function, if not influence, as "Jiggs" Chase's band at Sugar Hill Records, or those of Pumpkin at Enjoy Records and elsewhere, i.e. solving the problem of how to translate the backing to raps heretofore provided live by DJs. In the case of the first of these Winley releases, "Rhymin' and Rappin'" by Tanya and Paulette Winley (1979), the backing was "straightforward R&B, without the percussive explosions that were hip-hop's raison d'etre" while the rapping was somewhat tentative. Tanya "Sweet Tee" Winley's "Vicious Rap" (1980) was a leap forward, with Tanya in confident flow and the band even replicating a break at points. Tanya Winley raps in the party spirit characteristic of early hip hop, but the lyrics nonetheless detail a case of false arrest, and prophecy that she will "scream and shout ... and tell the government what it's all about". Along with Kurtis Blow's punning "The Breaks" (Mercury, 1980) and the much more radical "How We Gonna Make the Black Nation Rise?" by Brother D. (Clappers, 1980), "Vicious Rap" was among the first commercially recorded hip hop songs to feature social commentary, rather than party rhymes. Such records would remain a rarity until the success of "The Message" by Grandmaster Flash & the Furious Five on Sugar Hill two years later. The label's erstwhile claim that "Vicious Rap" was recorded in 1978, making it the first hip hop to make it to the recording studio, is sometimes repeated, but the apparent improvement in technique from 1979's "Rhymin' and Rappin'" makes this likely a piece of historical revisionism. A last single from the Winley daughters followed in 1982: "I Believe in the Wheel of Fortune".

Afrika Bambaataa was, with Grandmaster Flash and DJ Kool Herc (originator of hip hop's breakbeat DJing style), one of the prime movers in the emergence of hip hop in the 1970s. By 1980, Flash was recording for Enjoy Records with his MC team, the Furious Five, while Herc's star had faded—he was working in a record shop in South Bronx. Bambaataa recorded "Zulu Nation Throwdown" (1980) for Winley with his MC crew named The Cosmic Force. He arranged and directed the percussion and rapping, but further live band accompaniment was added before release without his knowledge. According to Peter Shapiro, though the record is now "ancient-sounding" in hip hop terms, Winley's group here had moved to keep pace with Pumpkin at Enjoy and the Sugarhill band, with Lisa Lee of the Cosmic Force "absolutely destroying all the male MCs". Bambaataa was initially displeased with the record, but it found favor with the new wave crowds who were being presented with hip hop music, dance and graffiti at shows by Bambaataa and others in downtown New York at this time. Bambaataa returned to Winley for "Zulu Nation Throwdown 2" (1980) with the Soul Sonic Force, but thoroughly dissatisfied with the label, he left for Tommy Boy Records, where he would record a single with a huge impact, "Planet Rock" (1982). Unruffled, Winley released Death Mix (1983) to cash in on the success of "Planet Rock". Death Mix was a vinyl pressing of a third- or fourth- hand cassette tape copy of a bootleg recording of a Bambaataa Zulu Nation night at James Monroe High School in the Bronx in 1980. Death Mix features Bambaataa and Jazzy Jay using an eclectic mix of records—including "Computer Games" by Yellow Magic Orchestra, showing the sensibilities that would lead to the electro of "Planet Rock"—, cutting up breaks for Zulu Nation MCs, and demonstrating early scratching techniques. Despite its extremely poor sound quality, it is "the best commercially-available snapshot of hip-hop's earliest days".

A new generation of acts appeared in the early to mid-1980s on labels like Def Jam, Profile and Cold Chillin', with a tougher image, musical style and lyrical delivery than their predecessors, eventually labeled as new school hip hop. This—what Shapiro calls "the Run-D.M.C. revolution"—signaled the end for labels like Enjoy, Sugar Hill and Winley. After releasing "Street Rock" by Rap Dynasty in 1985, the label folded, though two discs appeared in 2007 bearing the imprint's name and purporting to contain Bambaataa material from the 1970s. A collection of Winley hip hop, Death Mix: The Best of Paul Winley Records, was also released.

== Sources ==
- Chang, Jeff (2005). Can't Stop Won't Stop: A History of the Hip-Hop Generation. New York: Picador. ISBN 978-0-312-42579-1.
- Hager, Steven (September 21, 1982), "Afrika Bambaataa's Hip-Hop", Village Voice Reprinted in Cepeda, Raquel, ed. (2004). And It Don't Stop! The Best American Hip-Hop Journalism of the Last 25 Years. New York: Faber and Faber, Inc. ISBN 978-0-571-21159-3.
- Lewis, Miles Marshall (2004). Scars of the Soul Are Why Kids Wear Bandages When They Don't Have Bruises. New York: Akashic. ISBN 978-1-888451-71-9.
- Shapiro, Peter (2005). The Rough Guide To Hip Hop (2nd ed.). London: Rough Guides. ISBN 978-1-84353-263-7.
- Toop, David (2000). Rap Attack (3rd ed.). London: Serpent's Tail. ISBN 978-1-85242-627-9.
- Warner, Jay (2006). American Singing Groups: A History from 1940 to Today. Milwaukie: Hal Leonard Corp. ISBN 978-0-634-09978-6.
