= Looking for the Perfect Beat: 1980–1985 =

Looking for the Perfect Beat: 1980-1985

Compilation album by Afrika Bambaataa
- Released: March 20, 2001
- Length: 64:00
- Label: Tommy Boy
- Producer: Ninny, Kenny Donovan, Tom Silverman, Arthur Baker, John Robie, Afrika Bambaataa, The Fats Comet Crew, The Fats Comet Production

Afrika Bambaataa chronology
Electro Funk Breakdown (2001)	Looking for the Perfect Beat: 1980-1985 (2001)	Dark Matter Moving at the Speed of Light (2004)

Looking for the Perfect Beat: 1980–1985 is a compilation album by hip hop musician Afrika Bambaataa.

== Release ==
Looking for the Perfect Beat: 1980–1985 was released on March 20, 2001 on compact disc and a limited two disc vinyl set. The release was part of the label Tommy Boy Records' celebration of twenty years in the music industry.

== Reception ==
Professional ratings
Review scores
Source	Rating
Allmusic	5/5 stars
Robert Christgau	A−
NME	5/5 stars
Q	3/5 stars
Rolling Stone	4/5 stars

From contemporary reviews, John Duffy of AllMusic gave the album a five star out of five star rating, noting that Bambaataa's "considerable influence has largely been brushed aside by a rap world that sadly ignores far too many of its innovators" as well as "nicely augments the resume of producer Arthur Baker, a trailblazing dance remixer of the early '80s." Duffy main complaint with the compilation was the lack of any significant liner notes or photographs. The compilation included Bambaataa's "finest moments, including the classic "Planet Rock" alongside timeless siblings "Jazzy Sensation", "Looking For The Perfect Beat" and "Unity" with James Brown." and that the compilation "represents an integral part of hip-hop history and is an essential purchase for any serious fan of Black music." Jon Caramanica of Rolling Stone gave a positive review as well, noting that the "collection ably captures [Bambaataa's] dance-floor magnetism " and specifically praised tracks "Zulu Nation Throwdown", "Looking for the Perfect Beat" and "Renegades of Funk". Robert Christgau praised the collection stating it contained "at the irreducible least are two of the greatest records of the '80s" and noted that the tracks that range from competent to classic.

== Track listing ==
Track listing adapted from back of vinyl sleeve.

No.	Title	Writer(s)	Credited Performer	Length
1.	"Zulu Nation Throwdown"	Cosmic Force	Afrika Bambaataa Zulu Nation Cosmic Force	7:05
2.	"Zulu Nation Throwdown"	Soul Sonic Force	Bambaataa Zulu Nation Soul Sonic Force	6:07
3.	"Jazzy Sensation" (Bronx Version)	Kenton Nix	Afrika Bambaataa & The Jazzy 5	9:43
4.	"Planet Rock"	Arthur Baker, John Robie, Soul Sonic Force	Afrika Bambaataa & The Soul Sonic Force	6:25
5.	"Looking for the Perfect Beat"	Baker, Robie, Soul Sonic Force	Afrika Bambaataa & The Soul Sonic Force	7:00
6.	"Renegades of Funk"	Baker, Robie, Afrika Bambaataa Aasim, John Miller	Afrika Bambaataa & The Soul Sonic Force	6:44
7.	"Frantic Situation" (Vocal)	Baker, Leroi Evans, Ray Serrano, W. Henderson, E. Williams, Aasim, Wilfred Folwer, Miller, R. Allen	Afrika Bambaataa & The Soul Sonic Force with Shango	4:59
8.	"Unity Part 1 [The Third Coming]"	Aasim, James Brown, Bernard Alexander, Douglas Wimbish, Keith Le Blanc, Robin Halpin	Afrika Bambaataa & The Godfather of Soul James Brown	3:25
9.	"Who Do You Think You're Funkin' With?" (Hip Hop Mix)	Bambaataa, M. Glover, Le Blanc, Wimbush, S. McDonald, Miller, Allen, Williams	Afrika Bambaataa & The Soul Sonic Force featuring Melle Mel	6:18
10.	"What Time is It?" (Live)	Bambaataa, Glover, LeBlanc, Wimbush, McDonald, Miller, Allen, Williams, I. Coulter	Afrika Bambaataa & Soul Sonic Force featuring Melle Mel	8:53
11.	"Funk You!"	Bambaataa, LeBlanc, Wimbish, McDonald	Afrika Bambaataa & Family	5:42

== Personnel ==
Credits are from the Looking For the Perfect Beat sleeve.

- Ninny – producer (on tracks 1)
- Kenny Donovan – arrangements (on track 1), producer (on track 2)
- James Nichols – mixing (on track 1)
- Tom Silverman – executive producer (on tracks 3 and 4), edits (on track 8), producer (on track 9), mixing (on track 11)
- Arthur Baker – producer (on tracks 3, 4, 5, 6, 7 and 8), mixing (on tracks 4, 5, 6 and 7), arrangements (on track 6, 7 and 8), executive producer (on track 8)
- Shep Pettibone – mixing and arrangements (on tracks 3)
- Jay Burnett – engineer (on tracks 3 and 4)
- Bob Rosa – engineer (on tracks 4 and 9)
- Planet Patrol – music (on tracks 4)
- John Robie – producer and mixing (on tracks 5, 6, 7) and arrangements (on tracks 6, 7)
- Harry Belafonte – executive producer (on track 8)
- Afrika Bambaataa – producer (on tracks 9, 10)
- The Fats Comet Crew (Keith LeBlanc, Doug Wimbish and Skip McDonald) – producer (on track 9, 10)
- The Fats Comet Production (Keith LeBlanc, Doug Wimbish and Skip McDonald) – producer (on track 11)
- Keith LeBlanc – engineer (on track 11)
- Eric Calvi – engineer (on track 11)
