= Cholly Rock =

- Born: New York City
- Education: Bronx High School of Science; Alma Mater Lincoln University; Master’s Degree Human Svcs.
- Occupation: B-Boy & M.C.
- Years active: 1974 - 1978
- Style: Funk and hip hop

Anthony G. "Cholly Rock" Horne (born May 24, 1960), is a first generation B-Boy and one of the original 11 members of the Zulu Kings, the predecessor and genesis of the Universal Zulu Nation.

== Biography ==
Born and raised in The Gun Hill Houses in the Williamsbridge area of The Bronx, New York, Horne was introduced to breakdancing (in its original style of "Burning") in 1974, and began attending parties held by DJ Kool Herc.

Horne made his name as an "A1 BBoy" in the Bronx River Houses in Soundview, and was made a member of the Zulu Kings by Afrika Bambaataa in 1976, the first member from the Northeast Bronx. He was an early member of Bambaataa's Soulsonic Force MCs.

In his adult life, he has pursued a professional career in the field of public health and education as a teacher in the New York City school system, a facilitator and health educator for the New York State Department of Health, and a trainer for the Centers for Disease Control and Prevention.

== Discography ==
Year	Single	Label
1981	Cash Money	General Music Inc.
