= Ronald Savage =

American hip-hop activist

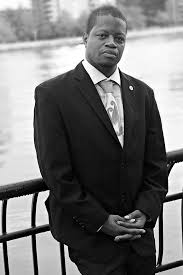
- Savage in 2006
- Born: October 6, 1965 (age 61); New York City, U.S.
- Other name: Bee-Stinger
- Occupations: American entrepreneur; hip-hop artist; author

Ronald "Bee-Stinger" Savage (born October 6, 1965) is an American entrepreneur, hip hop artist, author, and activist. He was a "crate boy" for Jazzy Jay, who was the DJ for Lance Taylor, better known as Afrika Bambaataa. In 2016, Savage publicly accused Bambaataa of sexually molesting him when he was 15; Savage's accusation was the first of several allegations of sexual abuse against Bambaataa. Savage later recanted parts of his accusations against Bambaataa.

== Early life ==
Growing up in the Castle Hill Houses in The Bronx, Savage became a member of the Universal Zulu Nation at the age of 14. Savage used to spend time with DJ Jazzy Jay while he recorded records in the early 1980s. Savage states, "The best time I had in hip hop, when I was a kid was being paid after the parties, we were being paid (by Bambaataa) in White Castles Hamburgers".

== Accusations against Afrika Bambaataa ==
Savage is best known for accusing Afrika Bambaataa of molesting him when Savage was 15 in 1980. The story broke in 2016 when veteran radio personality Troi "STAR" Torain, formerly of Star & Buc Wild on Hot 97, interviewed Savage on his virtual SHOT97 show. Savage was then featured on the front page of the New York Daily News on April 9.

The Universal Zulu Nation responded with an open-letter apology to all the men who were allegedly abused by Bambaataa when they were underage.

After the Child Victims Act passed in New York, Savage did not file suit against Afrika Bambaataa and later recanted his story. An anonymous man filed a child sex trafficking lawsuit in August 2021 against Afrika Bambaataa before the Child Victims Act one year window closed. Bambaataa did not respond to the open 2021 case. Doe v. Taylor, Case 70331/2021E, was filed in the Bronx Supreme Court. Doe's lawyer requested a default judgment.

== Legal troubles ==
In 2024, Savage registered the trademark Hip Hop Stands With Survivors and is being sued for trademark fraud by journalist Leila Wills. Wills alleges Savage used her mark and artwork in his registration application and defrauded two New York senators under the name Hip Hop Stands With Survivors. The federal lawsuit was filed in United States District Court for the Southern District of New York, titled Wills v. Savage, Case 1:24:cv:03752. Wills filed an additional complaint with the United States Patent and Trademark Office to cancel Savage's registration. Cancellation proceeding number 92085256 at the Trademark Trial and Appeal Board is pending the results of the Southern District of New York civil action.

== Music career ==
Savage got his start in the music industry in 1986 when Jazzy Jay built his recording studio in the Bronx on Blondell Ave. He paid his dues by running errands for Jazzy. In 1986, Jazzy Jay teamed up with Rocky Bucano to start Strong City Records. Soon, Jazzy moved the label to Allerton Ave in the Bronx, where Savage convinced the DJ's to play records of Strong City artists on rap radio and in rap clubs. Soon after in 1988 Strong City Records was acquired by MCA Records to become Strong City / MCA / Uni Records. There, Savage worked on Strong City Record acts such as Busy Bee Starski, Def Duo, Ultimate Force, Ice Cream Tee, Nu Sounds, BZ2 M.C.'s, and other groups like Brand Nubian, Showbiz & A.G, Fat Joe, which all worked out of Jazzy Jay Studios.

A few years later, he left Strong City Records and began working for Dick Scott Entertainment, the management company for the New Kids on The Block, Marky Mark, Boyz II Men. At Dick Scott Entertainment, Savage worked as an artist liaison for the rap group Snap!, whose single "I Got The Power" went No. 1 on the weekly charts in Spain, UK, Netherlands, Switzerland, as well as the Eurochart Hot 100. In 1990 the song hit No. 2 on the US Billboard Hot 100 chart. Savage also handled for Dick Scott Entertainment other groups as Doug E Fresh, Ikey Cee, and Show Biz & A.G.

While working as an artist liaison at Dick Scott Entertainment, he had a mild stroke from the constant stress at his job which ended his career in the music industry. Ronald Savage states about his released single in 2018 "Hip Hop Movement Anthem": "I'm not rapping on the single, this is an arrangement of classic hip hop beats for the clubs and DJ’s to bring fun and peace back to the forefront of hip-hop."

Savage is the service mark owner of the registered brand Hip Hop Movement, registered with the United States trademark and patent office.

== Non-profit and political work ==
In 2005, Savage started a non-profit organization called United Coalition Association. Its mission was to fight juvenile delinquency and counteract negative behavior in youth. It also allegedly organized college fairs to prepare students the entrance to college. The IRS revoked the United Coalition Association's nonprofit status in 2019 due to not filing three years in a row.

In 2008, Savage was elected to the New York State Democratic Committee with the help of former NYS Assemblyman Peter M Rivera. Savage was honored by the NAACP with an award in recognition of his devotion and commitment and uplifting youth in the community. Ronald Savage is also the founder of the New York State College Fair Day. He also created a DVD called The Plan which provides information about entrance to college.

In 2011 Savage marched with Occupy Wall Street protesters in New York. "We just drew up a resolution to raise taxes on the rich," he said. "I hope it makes it to the floor. The mayor and the governor need to be more egalitarian toward the poor and the working class. This protest and protests from around the world show strength in numbers. It's global. The people are tired," he said.

In 2011, Bronx borough president Rubén Díaz Jr. did not reappoint Savage, then a New York State Democratic Committeeman for the 76th Assembly District, to local Bronx Community Board 9 in the Soundview area of the Bronx, due to the fact that Savage helped Charlie Ramos (a candidate for senate) in the 2011 September primary elections against Ruben Diaz Jr's father, New York state Sen. Rubén Díaz Sr.

Later that year, Savage participated in legislative hearings in Albany organized by Assemblywoman Margaret Markey sponsoring the Child Victims Act, which was drafted to eliminate statute of limitations laws in New York State concerning child molestation allegations and allow a one-year window for alleged victims of past abuse to file a civil lawsuit. Among the people who spoke at the hearings was Queens native Ana Wagner, who was inspired to drive to the hearings and relate her own account after seeing Savage's photo on the front page of the New York Daily News while buying a lottery ticket at a 7-Eleven in Long Island. The bill was passed in 2019.

Savage was featured on the 2016 single "Don't Close Your Eyes" produced by Jonathan Hay, where he spoke over Bambaataa's song "Planet Rock" which was replayed in the track. Savage speaks out about child molestation and issues a very bold challenge to the President of the United States, stating, "Children are being molested every day. I was molested by a world Hip-Hop icon," states Savage. "My question is to the President of the United States of America: what are you going to do about the child molestation crisis of America?”. In 2016, Savage also stated in an interview in London, "I don't recognize the term hip hop culture because that is a term Bambaataa coined and I don't know what his intention was when he coined the term, but what I do recognize is hip hop and I salute the rebirth of the hip hop movement". He went back on his assertions in 2022 and reunited with Bambaataa in 2024.

== Discography ==
- 2018 – "Hip Hop Movement Anthem"
- 2019 – "Keep Goin"
- 2020 – "Lets Go"
- 2021 – "No Cappin"
- 2021 – "Snacks in the Night"
