= Planet Rock =

Planet Rock may refer to:

- "Planet Rock" (song), a 1982 song by Afrika Bambaataa and the Soulsonic Force
  - Planet Rock: The Album, a 1986 album containing the song
- Planet Rock (radio station), DAB radio station in the United Kingdom broadcasting classic rock music
