= Reckless (Afrika Bambaataa song) =

1988 single by Afrika Bambaataa

Single by Afrika Bambaataa and Family featuring UB40

from the album The Light
- B-side: "Mind Body and Soul"
- Released: February 8, 1988
- Genre: Funk
- Length: 3:54
- Label: EMI
- Songwriters: Afrika Bambaataa; UB40; John Robie; Malibu
- Producers: John Robie; UB40

Afrika Bambaataa singles chronology
"Bambaataa's Theme" (1986)	"Reckless" (1988)	"Sho Nuff Funky" (1988)

UB40 singles chronology
"Maybe Tomorrow" (1987)	"Reckless" (1988)	"Breakfast in Bed" (1988)

"Reckless" is a song by American rapper Afrika Bambaataa featuring British reggae band UB40. It was released as a single in February 1988 from Bambaataa's album The Light, and peaked at number seventeen on the UK Singles Chart.

== Release and reception ==
"Reckless" was produced by John Robie and features lead vocals by UB40's Ali Campbell, with UB40 providing the instrumentation on the song. It also features guest vocals by Malibu and Lizzie Tear. A music video was filmed in a nightclub featuring the singers and was directed by UB40's saxophonist Brian Travers.

"Reckless" was released in February 1988 with the B-side "Mind Body and Soul", only by Bambaataa, which was produced by Jazzy Jay. Initially, only one twelve-inch format of "Reckless" was released, a 'Wildstyle' mix. However, this was later followed by a 'Soca Chant Zouk' mix on February 22 and a 'Full Fon' remix on March 21.

Reviewing for Record Mirror, Andy Strickland described "Reckless" as having "downright infectious rhythms from this unlikely pairing" and that it is "not as heavy as previous Bambaataa collaborations like 'Time Zone', [but] this lighter approach should assure him of a hit. Bambaataa fans will probably cry 'sell out' but UB40 followers will love it. It's in a different class to 'I Got You Babe' even if the singalong chorus is a steal from the original 'Going Back To My Roots'. For Number One, Andrew Panos gave the song three out of five starts, describing it as "straightforward go ahead funk. And the rather odd combination works surprisingly well".

== Track listings ==
7": EMI / EM 41

1. "Reckless" – 3:54
2. "Mind Body and Soul" – 2:46

12": EMI / 12 EM 41

1. "Reckless" (Vocal Wildstyle Mix) – 7:10
2. "Mind Body and Soul" (Part 1 Vocal) – 5:53
3. "Mind Body and Soul" (Part 2 Serious Instrumental Mix) – 5:56

12": EMI / EMX 41

1. "Reckless" (The Soca Chant Zouk Mix) – 8:09
2. "Mind Body and Soul" (Part 3 Vocal Instrumental Mix) –
3. "Mind Body and Soul" (Part 4 Echo Mix) –

12": EMI / EMXS 41

1. "Reckless" (The Full Fon Remix) – 7:20
2. "Mind Body and Soul" (Part 1 Vocal) – 5:53
3. "Mind Body and Soul" (Part 2 Serious Instrumental Mix) – 5:56

CD: EMI / CDEM 41

1. "Reckless" – 3:58
2. " Reckless" (The Soca Chant Zouk Mix) – 8:13
3. "Mind Body and Soul" – 2:48

== Charts ==
=== Weekly charts ===
Chart (1988)	Peak position
Belgium (Ultratop 50 Flanders)	7
Finland (Suomen virallinen lista)	21
Ireland (IRMA)	19
Italy (Musica e dischi)	5
Italy Airplay (Music & Media)	1
Netherlands (Dutch Top 40)	5
Netherlands (Single Top 100)	4
New Zealand (Recorded Music NZ)	13
Spain (AFYVE)	4
UK Singles (OCC)	17
US Dance Club Songs (Billboard)	35
