= Tanya "Sweet Tee" Winley =

American rapper

Tanya "Sweet Tee" Winley is one of the earliest female rappers, active from 1979 to 1982. She is the daughter of Paul Winley, of Winley Records on 125th Street in Harlem (active 1956–1985). Paul Winley recorded Tanya's and sister Paulette's "Rhymin' and Rappin'" (1979) and Tanya's solo "Vicious Rap" (1980), which are two of the earliest examples of rap songs by women. Tanya Winley is possibly the first recorded female rapper, and was a contemporary of Lady B.

The beginning of her song "Vicious Rap" is sampled in Diamond D & The Psychotics "Best Kept Secret." Ego trip lists three of Tanya's songs as hip hop's greatest singles by year. "Rhymin' and Rappin'" ranks #6 in 1979, "Vicious Rap" ranks #9 in 1980, and "I Believe In The Wheel of Fortune" ranks #32 in 1982. Her repertoire is small, but her rhymes were written and recorded while she was a teenager. Her "Vicious Rap" is one of the earliest examples of conscious rap.

== The Winleys and early rap ==
Tanya "Sweet Tee" Winley was able to record and release her music with the help of her father Paul's recording business, Winley Records. In fact, Tanya's involvement in rap music led the elder Winley to record in this genre. Prior to recording his first rap song with his daughters, Paul Winley had released select Malcolm X speeches (Black Man’s History Volume 1, 1978) and the first breakbeat compilation (Super Disco Brakes, 1979), both of which had an influence on early rap.

== First recording ==
Tanya and her sister Paulette recorded "Rhymin' and Rappin" under Winley Records in 1979 – the same year that the first commercially successful rap records were released – "Rapper's Delight"by the Sugar Hill Gang, and "Christmas Rappin'" by Kurtis Blow. Dan Charnas, in The Big Payback: The History of the Business of Hip-Hop, relates that after a recording session with the Harlem Underground Band, Paul asked the band to play a "loose funky groove" while his teenaged daughters, Paulette and Tanya, tried out their rhymes. What eventually resulted was "Rhymin' and Rappin" (1979) – one of the earliest rap songs entirely by women. The "B" side of the record featured mother Ann Winley's funk song "Watch Dog."

== Career ==
After "Rhymin' and Rappin' Tanya went on to record and release "Vicious Rap", again under her father's record label. Sweet Tee's lyrics in this rap have been described as charged with social commentary, as she decries racial prejudice and oppression. "Vicious Rap" is a ballad of false arrest, where Tanya alludes to the struggles of young African Americans. This song was released in 1980, but it may have been recorded in 1978, a year before “Rhymin' and Rappin’”.

In 1982, Tanya and her sister Paulette released another single through Winley Records – “I Believe in the Wheel of Fortune” – this time a funk song. A few years later, her father Paul's record label folded, as he had a legal dispute about copyright infringements with Afrika Bambataataa. After the closure of Winley Records, Tanya's career declined.

== Discography ==
All of Tanya "Sweet Tee" Winley's songs were released on her father's record label, Winley Records.

- "Rhymin' and Rappin" (1979)
- "Vicious Rap" (1980)
- "I Believe in the Wheel of Fortune" (1982)
