= Swordfish (soundtrack) =

Swordfish <<The Album>>

Soundtrack album by Paul Oakenfold
- Released: 5 June 2001
- Genres: Movie soundtrack; big beat; breakbeat; trance
- Length: 67:32
- Labels: FFRR; London Sire
- Producer: Paul Oakenfold

Paul Oakenfold chronology
Perfecto Presents: Another World (2000)	Swordfish <<The Album>> (2001)	Perfecto Presents Ibiza (2001)

Professional ratings
Review scores
Source	Rating
Allmusic	Swordfish: The Album at AllMusic. Retrieved 06-207-2017.
NME	1.5/5 stars

Swordfish <<The Album>> is the original soundtrack of the 2001 film Swordfish. It was produced by Paul Oakenfold under Village Roadshow and Warner Bros. and distributed through London Sire Records, Inc.

As of 2001 it has sold 130,000 copies in United States according to Nielsen SoundScan.

== Track listing ==
No.	Title	Artist	Length
1.	"Swordfish (Intro)"		2:44
2.	"The Word (PMT Remix)"	Dope Smugglaz	4:31
3.	"Unafraid (Paul Oakenfold Mix)"	Jan Johnston	5:20
4.	"Dark Machine"	Paul Oakenfold & Christopher Young	7:35
5.	"New Born (Paul Oakenfold Mix)"	Muse	5:42
6.	"Chase"	Paul Oakenfold & Christopher Young	6:15
7.	"Harry Houdini"	John Travolta	0:31
8.	"Kneel Before Your God"	Lemon Jelly	2:02
9.	"Lapdance (Paul Oakenfold Swordfish Mix)" (featuring Lee Harvey & Vita)	N*E*R*D	3:39
10.	"Speed"	Paul Oakenfold	3:51
11.	"Planet Rock (Swordfish Mix)"	Paul Oakenfold vs. Afrika Bambaataa & The Soulsonic Force	7:47
12.	"Stanley's Theme"	Paul Oakenfold & Christopher Young	4:45
13.	"Password"	Paul Oakenfold	4:09
14.	"On Your Mind (Omaha Mix)"	Patient Saints	7:16
15.	"Get Out of My Life Now"	Paul Oakenfold & Planet Perfecto	4:05
Total length:			67:32

== Charts ==
Chart performance for Swordfish
Chart (2001)	Peak position
Australian Albums (ARIA)	72
