= Dark Matter Moving at the Speed of Light =

Studio album by Afrika Bambaataa
- Released: October 26, 2004
- Recorded: 2003–2004
- Genre: Hip hop, rap, electro-funk
- Label: Tommy Boy
- Producer: The Fort Knox Five, Überzone, DJ Sharaz, Simply Jeff, DJ Hektek

Afrika Bambaataa chronology
Looking for the Perfect Beat: 1980–1985 (2001)	Dark Matter Moving at the Speed of Light (2004)

Dark Matter Moving at the Speed of Light is a 2004 album by Afrika Bambaataa, released on Tommy Boy Entertainment.

== Track listing ==
No.	Title	Writer(s)	Producer(s)	Length
1.	"Got That Vibe" (featuring King Kamozi)	Bambaataa, Fort Knox Five	The Fort Knox Five	4:07
2.	"Metal" (featuring Gary Numan & MC Chatterbox)	Gary Numan, Debbie Harry, Chris Stein		4:58
3.	"Dark Matter" (featuring King Kamozi)	Bambaataa, Fort Knox Five	The Fort Knox Five	3:55
4.	"Take You Back"	Bambaataa, Fort Knox Five	The Fort Knox Five	3:57
5.	"Soul Makossa"	Manu Dibango	Überzone	5:02
6.	"Just a Smoke" (Featuring Mustafa Akbar)	Bambaataa, Fort Knox Five	The Fort Knox Five	3:42
7.	"2137" (Featuring Alien Ness)	Bambaataa, DJ Sharaz	DJ Sharaz	3:50
8.	"Almighty Ra" (Featuring TC Izlam)	Bambaataa, DJ Sharaz	DJ Sharaz	5:13
9.	"Touch & Go" (Featuring Muriel Fowler)	Allan Felder, Bunny Sigler		5:40
10.	"Shake 'N Pop Roll" (Featuring Aghi Spirits)	Bambaataa, Steve "Boogie" Brown		5:05
11.	"Ain't Talkin' No Shh"	Bambaataa	Simply Jeff	4:32
12.	"Pick Up on This"	Bambaataa		4:51
13.	"No Dope Fiends on the Floor"	Bambaataa		4:51
14.	"Electro Salsa"		DJ Hektek	1:22
15.	"B More Shake"	Bambaataa		1:17
16.	"Meet Me at the Party"	Bambaataa	Überzone	3:46
17.	"Sally" (Featuring King Kamozi)	Bambaataa, Hector Torres	DJ Hektek	5:19
18.	"Zulu Chant No. 5"			1:14
