= Jazzy Five =

Hip hop group

Jazzy Five was a hip hop group founded in the mid-1970s.

== History ==
The group was initially formed in South Bronx as the Jazzy Four by Charlie Choo, Master Bee, Master Ice, and MC Sundance, with Jazzy Jay as the group's DJ. Prior to the group's formation, its members were associated with Afrika Bambaataa and the Universal Zulu Nation. After several line-up changes with the departure of MC Sundance and Charlie Choo, the recruitment of Mr. Freeze and Master Dee as their replacements, respectively, and the further addition of A.J. Les, the group became known as the Jazzy Five.

“Jazzy Sensation (Bronx Version)” was recorded by Afrika Bambaataa and the Jazzy Five in 1981 as the first hip hop single on Tommy Boy Records. The song was the only major hit for the Jazzy Five. The song was later remixed by Shep Pettibone.

After having performed regularly at parties in New York, the group disbanded in the mid-1980s.
