= The Light (Afrika Bambaataa album) =

Studio album by Afrika Bambaataa & Family
- Released: 1988
- Genre: Hip hop; synthpop; electro
- Length: 60:00
- Label: Capitol
- Producer: Afrika Bambaataa, John Robie

Afrika Bambaataa & Family chronology
| Death Mix Throwdown (1987) | The Light (1988) | The Decade of Darkness (1990) |

Professional ratings
Review scores
| Source | Rating |
|---|---|
| AllMusic | 2/5 stars |
| Christgau's Record Guide | B |
| Spin Alternative Record Guide | 7/10 |

The Light is a studio album by Afrika Bambaataa and Family, released in 1988. UB40, Jaki Graham, and Boy George were among the guest musicians. "Reckless", featuring UB40, peaked at No. 17 in the UK.

== Track listing ==
| No. | Title | Writer(s) | Length |
|---|---|---|---|
| 1. | "The Light" | Afrika Bambaataa, John Robie | 3:14 |
| 2. | "Reckless" | | 5:24 |
| 3. | "Revolutionary Dance" | Afrika Bambaataa, John Robie | 4:27 |
| 4. | "All I Want" | Afrika Bambaataa, John Robie | 4:56 |
| 5. | "Something He Can Feel" | Curtis Mayfield | 5:53 |
| 6. | "Shout It Out" | Kid Dust, Maxx Kidd | 6:23 |
| 7. | "Clean Up Your Act" | Afrika Bambaataa, George Clinton, Bootsy Collins, Bill Laswell | 6:16 |
| 8. | "Zouk Your Body" | Afrika Bambaataa, Lowell Dunbar, Robbie Shakespeare, Yellowman | 6:38 |
| 9. | "World Racial War" | Afrika Bambaataa, Bill Laswell | 6:28 |
| 10. | "Sho' Nuff Funky" | Afrika Bambaataa, James Brown, Maxx Kidd | 10:46 |
| Total length: | | | 60:00 |

== Singles ==
"Reckless" was arranged and produced by John Robie. Vocals were provided by Afrika Bambaataa, Lizzie Tear, Malibu and UB40, who also provided all instrumentation. It was Afrika Bambaataa's second highest-charting single in the UK after "Afrika Shox", which he released in 1999 with Leftfield.

| Song | UK |
|---|---|
| Reckless | 17 |
| Sho' Nuff Funky | 99 |
