= Captain Sky =

American singer

- Birth name: Daryl L. Cameron
- Born: July 10, 1957 (age 67); Chicago, Illinois, U.S.
- Genres: Funk R&B, Soul, Dance Music
- Instrument(s): Vocals, bass
- Years active: 1978–present
- Labels: AVI Records, TEC, WMOT, Philly World Records.

Daryl L. Cameron (born July 10, 1957, in Chicago, Illinois), better known as Captain Sky, is an American musician and singer. Captain Sky’s funk-based musical style, futuristic costumes, and psychedelic imagery are similar to those of George Clinton, Bootsy Collins, and other Parliament/Funkadelic projects. His signature song 'Super Sporm' was notably referenced in the hip hop standard Rapper's Delight by The Sugarhill Gang His album The Adventures of Captain Sky was the first album on vinyl to have expanded grooves for DJs to identify different parts of the song with, such as the percussion or bass break. The style of production on the album with gaps on the songs made it easier for hip hop artists to sample.

With a group of other Chicago-based musicians, Captain Sky began recording around 1978 and released The Adventures of Captain Sky in that year, followed quickly by Pop Goes The Captain in 1979. In the liner notes to the first Captain Sky album, Captain Sky’s origins are explained in this way: “Oh, by the way, if you’re wondering, Daryl Cameron somehow entered the phonebooth of his mind and emerged as Captain Sky. Tune in again.” Both albums were released by AVI Records. Several singles were released from these albums, most notably “Wonder Worm” and “Super Sporm.” By 1980, Captain Sky had moved to TEC records and on that imprint released his third album Concerned Party #1. After several more singles, The Return of Captain Sky, his final album, was released in 1981 back on AVI records. That particular album was not authorized or endorsed by Captain Sky. Since that time, Captain Sky has released singles sporadically on various labels and older tracks have been included on various compilations. Captain Sky also signed with Philly World Records, WMOT, and as a concept artist with Sweet Mountain/Sugar Hill Records.

== Early life ==
Cameron grew up in the Washington Heights neighbourhood of Chicago, with his introduction to music from his father giving him a guitar as gift for his 13th birthday. Cameron attended Luther High School South playing in rock and funk groups there, while listening to soul music on WVON radio.

== Career ==
Before going solo, he was in the Bionic Band and South Side Movement. In the mid 70s he was part of a duo, Aura, with Sheryl Sawyer daughter of Chicago mayor Eugene Sawyer.

Afterwards he joined with Curtis Mayfield's business partner Eddie Thomas who helped sign Cameron to AVI Records. During the first album's recording, Cameron's parents paid for the studio time, working at a pace that was with less pressure from the label alongside keyboardist Donald Burnside. On the 1979 sophomore release 'Pop Goes the Captain', Cameron collaborated with engineer Danny Leake. While touring at the time, his costumes were made by Dexter Griffin who also designed Bootsy Collins' outfits. Cameron brought along then teenager Vince Lawrence for pyrotechnics who went to become a notable house music producer. During this time he dealt with cocaine addiction. After his third release in 1980 with 'Concerned Party #1' he moved to back Chicago in 1985.

In 2011 Cameron moved to Houston, becoming a state-certified peer support specialist for substance abuse recovery. In 2018 he moved back to Chicago to work at a south-side hospital.

In 2020, he released his first album in 40 years, The Whole 9.

== Sampled by other artists ==
Captain Sky’s single “Super Sporm” has been sampled by many artists including:

Year	Artist	Song	Album
1982	Afrika Bambaataa and the Soulsonic Force	Planet Rock	
1987	Boogie Down Productions	Super Hoe	Criminal Minded
1987	MC Shan	Living in the World of Hip-Hop	Down by Law
1987	Public Enemy	You’re Gonna Get Yours	Yo! Bum Rush the Show
1989	Boogie Down Productions	You Must Learn	Ghetto Music: The Blueprint of Hip Hop
1993	Salt-N-Pepa	Shoop	Very Necessary
1993	Wu-Tang Clan	Method Man	Enter The Wu-Tang (36 Chambers)
1996	De La Soul	Supa Emcees	
1998	Bob Sinclar	Ultimate Funk	12″ Single

== Discography ==
Albums

Year	Album	Chart	Peak
1979	The Adventures of Captain Sky	Black Albums	30
1979	The Adventures of Captain Sky	Pop Albums	157
1979	Pop Goes the Captain	Black Albums	49
1980	Concerned Party #1	Black Albums	69
1980	Concerned Party #1	Pop Albums	210
2020	The Whole 9		

Singles

Year	Song	Chart	Peak
1979	“Dr. Rock”	Bubbling Under the Hot 100	105
1980	“Sir Jam a Lot”	Black Singles	51
1986	“You Bring Me Up”	Hot RnB/HipHop	80
