= The Decade of Darkness =

Studio album by Afrika Bambaataa
- Released: 1991
- Genre: Hip-hop
- Label: EMI

Afrika Bambaataa chronology
The Light (1988)	The Decade of Darkness (1991)	Don't Stop... Planet Rock (The Remix EP) (1992)

The Decade of Darkness, also referred to as 1990–2000 The Decade of Darkness, is an album by the American musician Afrika Bambaataa, released in 1991. Bambaataa is credited with his backing musicians, the Family. The Decade of Darkness was Bambaataa's first album for EMI Records.

The first single was "Just Get Up and Dance", which peaked at No. 4 on Billboard's Dance Club Songs chart. It peaked at No. 45 on the UK Singles Chart.

== Production ==
The album was recorded in Italy, where Bambaataa worked with producers with backgrounds in Italian disco. "Say It Loud (I'm Black, I'm Proud)" is a version of the James Brown song. "Sweat" was inspired by Prince's song "Head".

== Critical reception ==
Professional ratings
Review scores
Source	Rating
AllMusic	3/5 stars
Calgary Herald	B
The Encyclopedia of Popular Music	3/5 stars
Entertainment Weekly	B
The Rolling Stone Album Guide	3.5/5 stars
Spin Alternative Record Guide	6/10

The Chicago Tribune deemed the album "another smoking mix of funk, rock, hip-hop and world beats and street-smart social commentary." The Washington Post called it "a package of ambient, hip-house Euro-dance tracks." The Calgary Herald wrote that the "first side is incendiary... Prime dance music, sorta like a '90s version of Chic packing heat." Entertainment Weekly noted that, "unlike most of the trendy hip-house imitators currently working, [Bambaataa] has grit and soul... This album is one good street party, put together by an old master."

AllMusic stated: "Fueled by righteous social commentary throughout the songs, the record showed that he wasn't creatively spent."

== Track listing ==
No.	Title	Length
1.	"Just Get Up and Dance"
2.	"Taste the Funk"
3.	"Sweat"
4.	"Save the World"
5.	"Can't Give You Up"
6.	"Power Boy Power"
7.	"Steppin' Hard Zulu Nation"
8.	"Freedom"
9.	"Soca Fever (Rock It)"
10.	"In a Minute"
11.	"Electro Funk Express"
12.	"Say It Loud (I'm Black, I'm Proud)"
