= Looking for the Perfect Beat =

"Looking For the Perfect Beat"

Single by Afrika Bambaataa & The Soulsonic Force
- Released: December 1982
- Genre: Electro
- Length: 6:56
- Label: Tommy Boy
- Composers: Arthur Baker, John Robie, Afrika Bambaataa Aasim, SoulSonic Force
- Lyricists: Arthur Baker, MC G.L.O.B.E.
- Producers: Arthur Baker, John Robie

Afrika Bambaataa & The Soulsonic Force singles chronology
"Planet Rock" (1982)	"Looking For the Perfect Beat" (1982)	"Renegades of Funk" (1983)

Audio sample
- file; help

"Looking for the Perfect Beat" is a song by Afrika Bambaataa & the Soulsonic Force. The song was produced by Arthur Baker and John Robie and was the follow-up track for the group following "Planet Rock". The track took much longer to develop than "Planet Rock" with Baker using cocaine and the pressure involved with creating a follow-up single. The group was developed for months in Robie's apartment while Afrika Bambaataa and the Soul Sonic Force were touring.

The track was released in December 1982 and was later ranked at number 13 among the "Tracks of the Year" for 1983 by the NME.

== Production ==
Producer Arthur Baker recalled that Tommy Boy Records head Tom Silverman decided that "Planet Rock" was successful enough that the group should have a follow-up. Following this period, Baker released leftover music from the "Planet Rock" sessions titled "Play At Your Own Risk" after adding vocals and some more music to it. While the Soulsonic Force was touring, Baker worked on a new track at Robie's apartment home and were trying to develop a new track. Baker felt that the group needed a different approach than "Planet Rock" as "everyone was sort of biting off what we had done. I thought there’s no way we can do the same thing, we have to do something different." and "we couldn't go even close to anything with that kind of tempo or beat." The pressure of creating a follow-up led to Baker "rediscover[ing] drugs" and was "doing lots of cocaine – it didn’t really help."

Baker recalled that the song's title arrived to him when developing the track, thinking "Man, we're looking for the perfect beat and we've already found it.' It quickly dawned on me that this was a good song title". Soulsonic Force member MC G.L.O.B.E. was tasked with writing the lyrics. Baker performed some vocals on the track that the rappers did not want to perform, including the lines “Beat This” and the “Looking for the per- looking for the per- looking for the perfect.” and some barking on the track which the rappers did not want to perform. In 1999, Baker declared that the "Beat This" was "almost a taunt at Sylvia [Robinson], because there was definitely competition between us and Sugar Hill. It was like a challenge. It was really adventurous. I didn’t wanna do a typical rap record.

== Release ==
"Looking for the Perfect Beat" was released in December 1982. Attempts to get a full-length album for Bambaataa were not possible with Tommy Boy as Silverman's contract with him was strictly for singles; re-negotiating the contract proved to be difficult. A full-length album titled Planet Rock: The Album was released in 1986, which contained the three other singles "Planet Rock", "Renegades of Funk", "Frantic Situation", and three previously unreleased tracks.

== Reception ==
From contemporary reviews, J.D. Considine gave the song a four out of five rating, writing in The Baltimore Sun that "Looking for the Perfect Beat" "doesn't manage the same sense of discovery" as "Planet Rock" but it "manages to be almost as catchy" stating that it "refines the relationship between the vocals and the electronic pulse" noting that " the rapping on the song was "fairly trite, but it makes up for that by always being "on the one.". Lloyd Bradley of the NME said that the song would feel more simple than "Planet Rock" at first as the basic beat was more immediate but that on delving deeper in it would be worth it as the listener was left with "the most enduring and interesting electronic funk around."

Critic Robert Palmer placed "Looking for the Perfect Beat" as his top single of 1983 declaring it "The year's finest single" noting it was "an ingenious small symphony in rap rhythms, and a dance-floor favorite" noting that it was "the year's most widely imitated new sound." "Looking For the Perfect Beat" was ranked at number 13 among the "Tracks of the Year" for 1983 by NME.

== Track listing ==
12" single (TB 831)

1. "Looking for the Perfect Beat (Vocal)" – 6:56
2. "Bonus Beats II" – 2:00
3. "Looking for the Perfect Beat (Instrumental)" – 6:58

== Credits ==
Credits adapted from the liner notes and expanded with information in the article.

- Arthur Baker — producer, arrangements, mixing, composer, vocals
- John Robie—producer, arrangements, mixing, composer
- Tom Silverman — executive producer
- Afrika Bambaataa Aasim — composer (on tracks "Looking For the Perfect Beat" and "Bonus Beats II")
- Soul Sonic Force — composer (on tracks "Looking For the Perfect Beat" and "Bonus Beats II")
