= Planet Rock (song) =

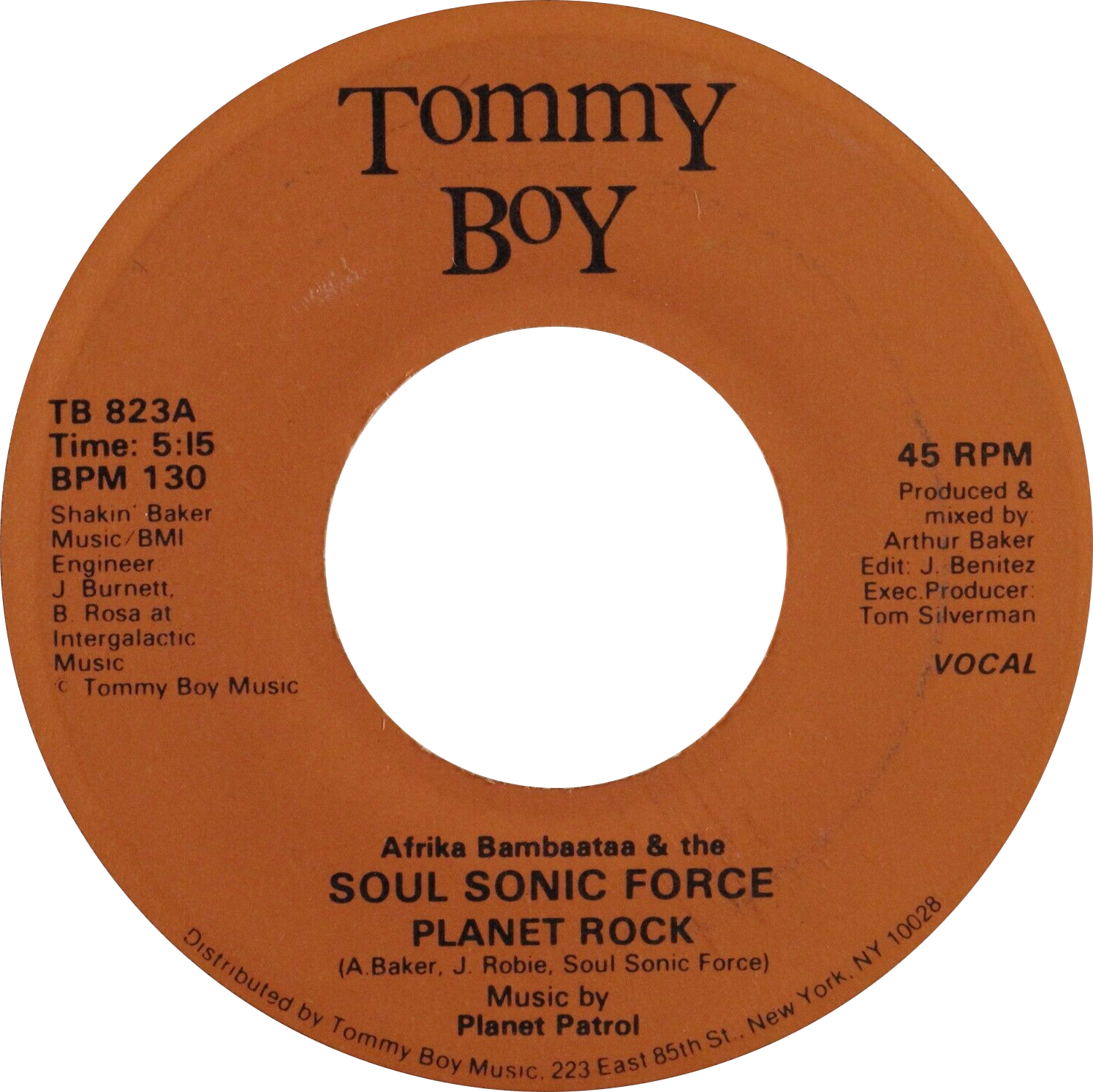
- Side A of US 7-inch vinyl single

Single by Afrika Bambaataa & the Soulsonic Force
- Released: 1982
- Studio: Intergalactic Studio
- Genre: Electro; hip-hop
- Length: 6:25
- Label: Tommy Boy
- Composers: Arthur Baker; John Robie; Soulsonic Force
- Lyricists: Emcee G.L.O.B.E.; Arthur Baker
- Producer: Arthur Baker

Afrika Bambaataa & the Soulsonic Force singles chronology
"Planet Rock" (1982)	"Looking for the Perfect Beat" (1982)

"Planet Rock" is a song by the American hip-hop artists Afrika Bambaataa and the Soul Sonic Force. The song was produced by Arthur Baker and released by Tommy Boy Records in 1982. The recording came together after DJ and producer Baker met with Bambaataa and the two bonded over the idea of creating a song about their mutual appreciation for the band Kraftwerk, along with inspiration from Yellow Magic Orchestra (YMO), Gary Numan and George Clinton.

Baker and Bambaataa had worked together previously on the song "Jazzy Sensation" and decided to compose a more electronic based version of the hip hop song with Roland TR-808 beats, as opposed to the more disco-oriented work popular at the time. Along with musician John Robie, the group recorded the single at Intergalactic Studios in New York. Robie duplicated the sound on the record and had Bambaataa's rappers in the Soul Sonic Force rap over it. To create the raps, the lyricist of the group, Emcee G.L.O.B.E., had to develop a style he called "mc popping", which involved rapping off time, an unusual style at the time.

The song quickly gained popularity, eventually earning a Gold record certification in the United States, the first for the group and label. The new musical style on the song later became known as electro. The song features simple lyrics discussing the power of music and having a fun time. After its release, the song began to get airtime on the radio. The use of Kraftwerk's music on the song was done without permission. The band approached the label and Tommy Boy's manager, Tom Silverman, eventually agreed to give Kraftwerk one dollar for every record sold. He increased the price of the single to make a return on the record. Attempts to get a full-length album for Bambaataa were not possible with Tommy Boy initially as Silverman's contract with him was strictly for singles and re-negotiating it proved difficult. "Planet Rock" later was released on the album titled Planet Rock: The Album in 1986.

The song was listed as one of the best singles of 1982 by the NME and was described by Robert Palmer of The New York Times as "perhaps the most influential black pop record of 1982", noting its influence on "both the black pop mainstream and several leading white new-wave rockers". Several musicians and groups noted how the track influenced them including Run-DMC, 2 Live Crew, A Guy Called Gerald, Fatboy Slim and Newcleus. The song has been remixed and re-released several times, has been described as one of the definitive electro songs by AllMusic, and has been voted the third greatest hip hop song by Rolling Stone.

== Background ==
Arthur Baker had moved from Boston to New York in 1981 where he had been DJing, producing and mixing records and working as a music journalist as early as 1976. By his own admission, Baker described himself as a "shit DJ" and was more interested in making music despite not being a musician. His musical work included co-producing a few records under the name Northend with singer Tony Carbone and drummer Russell Presto for West End Records. Baker followed these up in the late 1970s with an album he made that was released by Tom Moulton as TJM, followed by "Happy Days" a single on North End Records. Along with working in the studio, Baker was also writing reviews for the magazine Dance Music Report, which was owned by Tom Silverman who was starting up the label Tommy Boy Records.

Afrika Bambaataa had worked as a disc jockey in the mid-1970s working block parties in the south east Bronx. Bambaataa played a variety of eclectic music and searched throughout New York to find new records. This led to him discovering music by Kraftwerk, Yellow Magic Orchestra and Gary Numan. Bambaataa met Silverman at one of his DJ sets, which led to working on releases for Tommy Boy including "Let's Vote" by Nuri and other tracks for a girl group called Cotton Candy.

Silverman was concerned that Tommy Boy's record sales were insignificant. He talked to Baker, the only producer he knew, about producing a record. He had Baker produce "Jazzy Sensation" for Afrika Bambaataa and the Jazzy 5 which was released by Tommy Boy in 1982. The record was successful; Baker estimated it sold 30,000 records.

Silverman suggested a two-record a follow-up which led to Bambaataa and Baker creating a record based on their love of the band Kraftwerk. Baker recalled that when he heard Kraftwerk's song "Numbers" being played at the Music Factory in Brooklyn, he saw "black guys in their twenties and thirties asking, 'What's that beat?' So I knew that if we used that beat and added an element of the street, it was going to work."

John Robie was a guitarist and synthesizer player who lived in New York. Robie detested disco music, believing musicians did not have to have talent to make it, declaring "you had people playing to metronomes, everyone sounding the same, and lyrics that were nonsensical and generally infantile". Although Robie described himself as starting out as a die-hard rock musician, he was a fan of early hip hop music, discussing in 1991 that the genre was "a great form of expression [...] What was great about those early rap records was that there was a melodic content to them, they were music at the same time."

Robie began meeting with Bambaataa, who showed off his abilities on keyboards after Bambaataa had asked him if he could play music similar to Kraftwerk. Bambaataa contacted Silverman about Robie's talents, which led to him meeting with Baker to work on "Planet Rock". Robie later recalled on their work together as an "unlikely mix of talents was as much of a phenomenon as their record itself. People from totally different backgrounds with completely dissimilar tastes and styles [...] At the time I remember it feeling pretty bizarre."

== Production ==
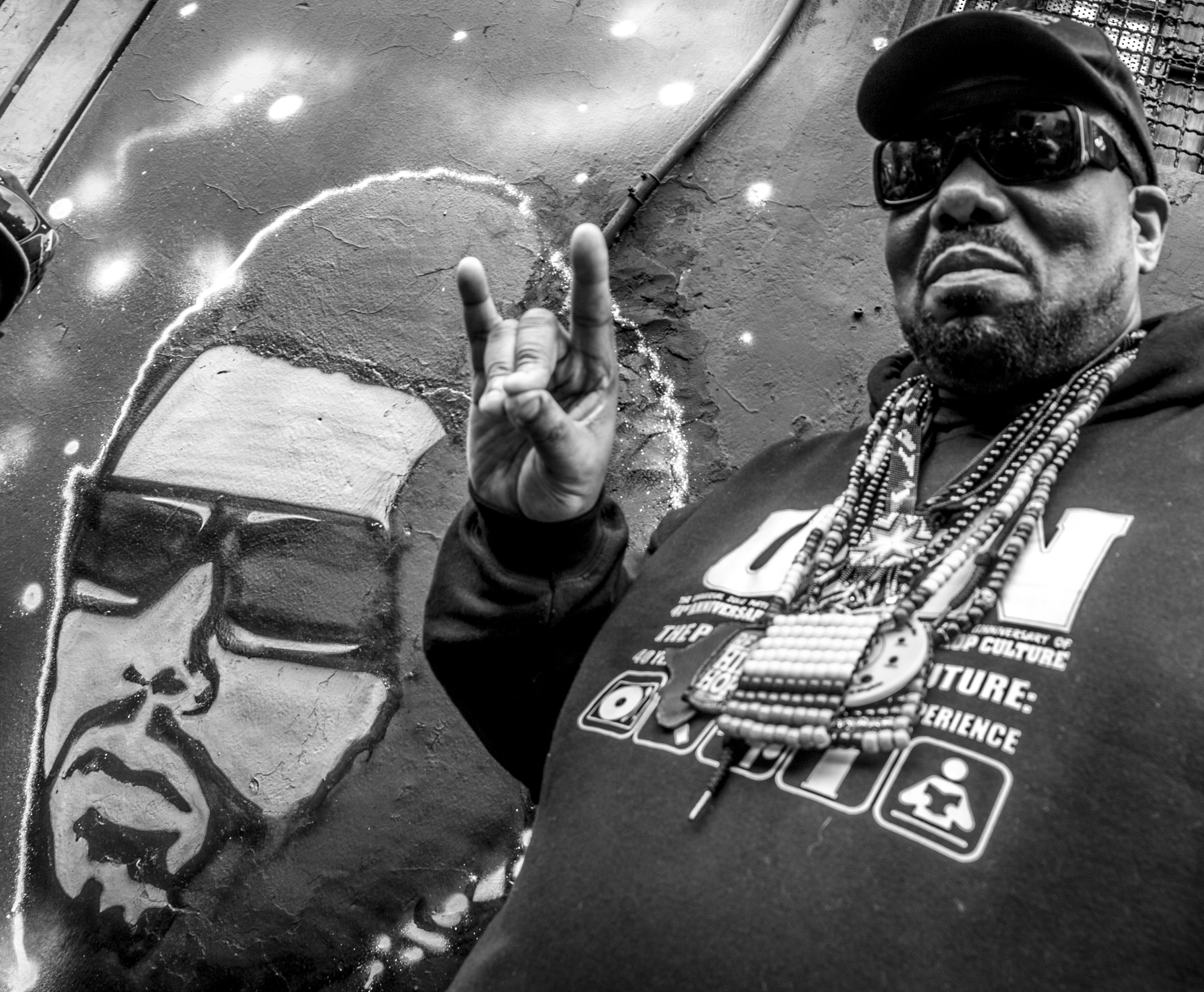
Afrika Bambaataa suggested using drums from "Super Sporm" by Captain Sky for "Planet Rock".

Baker is not sure when "Planet Rock" was recorded, stating it was either 1980 or 1981. Prior to going into the studio, Bambaataa recalled working at Silverman's father's house in White Plains, New York, working on a bassline taken from B. T. Express that was not used. Robie, Bambaataa and Baker recorded "Planet Rock" at Intergalactic Studio. The group had previously recorded "Jazzy Sensation" at the same studio. The record was completed quickly, as they did not have a large recording budget. Baker said it took approximately three all-night sessions. During the first they developed the music and a bit of the rap. The next night they worked on the rapping, and the final night mixed the record.

The studio's equipment included a Neve console, Studer 24–track tape machine and UREI monitors, a Lexicon PCM41 digital delay, Sony reverb and a Fairlight CMI digital synthesizer. Baker said:

They only had a few things, and so we basically got all of our effects out of the Lexicon PCM41, including Bambaataa's electronic vocal vocoder sound. That came through a really, really tight delay, almost like a tight electronic phasing, and then there was the state–of–the–art Sony reverb. However, other than that, there weren't a whole load of effects on that record.

The group lacked a Roland TR-808 drum machine they could use but found one advertised in The Village Voice—"Man with drum machine, 20 dollars a session." They played the musician, named Joe, the Kraftwerk song "Numbers" and asked to have that programmed into the drum machine as well as the song 'Super Sporm'. The 808 was programmed through the Neve console, which Baker described as an "amazing mixing board". In the studio, Baker experimented with the Fairlight CMI and found a few sounds on it, including one of an explosion, which would be used later on "Planet Rock". He later lamented the Fairlight's lack of usefulness describing it as a "$100,000 waste of space".

Robie provided the group with a Micromoog and Prophet-5 synthesizers. Baker later praised Robie's studio work, saying he "could play. You'd tell him to play something and he'd play it and add something to it. He was really, really good." Baker said it took about eight hours to get the track in working order and develop it first without any rappers. Bambaataa commented "a lot of people think we sampled Kraftwerk but it's just not true. John Robie was a bad-ass synthesizer player, so he was just good in playing stuff, that it sounded like they sampled the record."

When asked about how much Bambaataa contributed to the record, Baker felt that he was "more of an inspiration" and "definitely had [an] influence" but was unfamiliar with studio equipment. When asked in 1985 about his contributions to his records, Bambaataa said he did not do "much rapping" but helped develop the records, stating that: "They may be written or produced by whomever, but you can be sure I had something to do with getting the sound I want, whether it's a certain chant, keyboard riff, drum pattern or a speed-up on the synthesizers." Bambaataa added that whether he works with Bill Laswell of Material or Baker, he "usually act[s] as a co-producer" and brings "one of my groups to come up with a strong rap".

Among Bambaataa's suggestions, was using a beat from Captain Sky's "Super Sporm". Bambaataa was concerned that people would feel they were copying Kraftwerk, so he proposed adding the beat. The group was nervous about how Kraftwerk would react to "Planet Rock" and developed a separate melody line for it. Silverman eventually stepped in and had the group use the "Trans-Europe Express" melody. The unused melody would end up being used on "Play At Your Own Risk" by Planet Patrol. The music for both "Play At Your Own Risk" and "Planet Rock" were recorded on the same tape.

Influenced by George Clinton, who had many separate music groups that contained the same band members, Bambaataa formed his groups such as the Soul Sonic Force, which in its original form consisted of about twenty members of the Universal Zulu Nation. The personnel used within the Soul Sonic Force whom Bambaataa performed and recorded with was smaller and contained two separate groups with the same name. The first included performers Mr. Biggs, Queen Kenya, and DJ Cowboy while the second variation of the group included Mr. Biggs, Pow Wow, G.L.O.B.E. and DJ Jazzy Jay.

The Soul Sonic Force members that contributed to "Planet Rock" consisted of rappers Mr.Biggs, Pow Wow, and G.L.O.B.E. When they came in to perform the vocals, Baker said that they "hated the music. Not even hated it. They despised it." The rappers wanted to perform something closer to "Jazzy Sensation" and other tracks that were on the R&B charts. Baker specifically recalled Mr.Biggs refusing to rap on it. Baker recalled that G.L.O.B.E. eventually got the group to rap it by not rapping exactly on the beat.

Baker says he cannot remember where the title "Planet Rock" came from, but that G.L.O.B.E. wrote all of the song's lyrics except the chorus that Baker wrote. G.L.O.B.E. wrote most of the group's lyrics. Baker said he was certain of this and admitted to stealing the "Rock rock to the Planet Rock, don't stop." line from the record "Body Music" by The Strikers, which had the line "Punk rock to the punk rock, don't stop."

Jay Burnett, who engineered the song, performed the "rock rock to the planet rock, don't stop" vocal. Bob Rosa provided some overdubbing for the record and approximately 30 hours were spent recording and mixing "Planet Rock" before the single was mastered and then remastered. Jazzy Jay, an associate of Bambaataa's, described editing "Planet Rock" as "the most tedious thing". He recalled Baker being there during the whole editing process: "splicing, cutting tape with a razor blade. What we do now with just a few strokes of the keyboard."

== Music and style ==
"Planet Rock"
A sample of "Planet Rock" featuring the melody of "Trans-Europe Express" and rapping from the Soul Sonic Force.

Author and essayist Kurt B. Reighley described "Planet Rock" as a fusion of hip-hop breaks and "icy synthesizer lines lifted from Kraftwerk" that "laid the blueprint for the genre dubbed "electro". On its release, the genre of the song was not clear. Producer Rick Rubin said that "at the time we barely considered it a rap record", while DJ Muggs of Cypress Hill said that on the West Coast, hip hop had not hit until around 1984 and people listening to "Planet Rock" called it funk.

Baker described the sound of "Planet Rock" as a "marriage of electronic music with street culture and black music". He expanded on this, comparing the use of Kraftwerk's songs to cover songs, noting that "Black music has always had cover records. What I was trying to do was mix in the DJ bits of other records. It was a conscious thing. [...] I tried to create what a DJ would do with records." Although acknowledging the influence of Kraftwerk, Bambaataa said the group was only part of the influence on the sound, naming Gary Numan and Yellow Magic Orchestra as inspiration.

Describing the song's sound as "electro funk", Bambaataa said his idea for the song's sound was for it to be electronic but with "a lot of funk and heavy bass". He noted the influence of James Brown, Sly & The Family Stone, George Clinton and his bands Parliament and Funkadelic. The Soul Sonic Force's look and stage wear—carved African walking sticks, Mardi Gras style headdresses and Zulu beads, a fashion that Bambaataa called the "wildstyle"—was compared to those of the bands Parliament and Funkadelic.

Author William Eric Perkins described "Planet Rock" as "lyrically simple", with lyrics that encouraged the listener to have a "fun life and a funky good time". The lyrics of "Planet Rock" celebrated the ability of music to take listeners to the past and the future while encouraging them to enjoy the present. The song contains positive messages about "chasing your dreams", and to "live it up" because "our world is free". Baker described the Soul Sonic Force's rapper G.L.O.B.E. as the genius of the group. G.L.O.B.E. described himself as an "MC popper" a style Baker summarized as rapping "sort of half-time thing. Instead of being on the beat, being off the beat. That was very different at the time." Pow Wow performed the wordless vocal of "zz-zz-zz" when he could not remember his lines in the song. Baker later commented that if he could change anything in the song it would have been that verse.

== Release ==
=== Initial release ===
Prior to releasing "Planet Rock", Baker played the song in various record stores in Brooklyn and Manhattan asking listeners what they thought of it. In an interview with Billboard, Baker said: "Ninety percent of the people [I] asked wanted to buy it right away." One person even offered him $200 for his acetate copy. Baker took the acetate into the Music Factory record shop in Brooklyn. It blew up their speakers because of the track's excessive low-end.

Sources vary on the release date of "Planet Rock". An article in Sound on Sound states it was released in June 1982. The liner notes to Planet Rock: The Album state the release was in April 1982. In an interview in the July 24, 1982, issue of Billboard Silverman says that "Planet Rock" had only been available for 90 days.

Shortly after the production, Jazzy Jay was driving on a freeway and heard "Planet Rock" on the radio and rushed off to phone Bambaataa to tell him about it. Jay was in shock. Earlier meetings with radio station personnel asking them to play hip hop were met with claims it was not a genre but a fad; they refused to play it. The single peaked on Billboard's Hot 100 on September 11, 1982, at number 48 and spent 11 weeks on the chart. It went Gold in the United States by October 1982.

The group was concerned that Kraftwerk would be angry with them for using the "Trans-Europe Express" melody. Karl Bartos, the co-writer of "Numbers", said that "in the beginning we were very angry, because they didn't credit the authors [...] [so] we felt pissed off [...] there was nothing written down saying that its source was 'Trans-Europe Express' and 'Numbers'." Kraftwerk approached Tommy Boy and Silverman decided to give the group a dollar for each record sold. As a result, Silverman raised the list price of the record stating that the single became "$5.98 list 12-inch, as opposed to a $4.98. But by the time he did that, the record was so hot, people just went for it." Wolfgang Flür responded that "[t]hey didn't even ask in the first place whether Kraftwerk was in agreement ... the company that had released the single, Tommy Boy Records, had to fork out a lot of money after the event, but they just increased the price of the single [...] and recouped their fine".

=== Re-releases and remixes ===
After "Planet Rock" had been released Silverman said he wanted a 7-inch edit of the song. He knew that John "Jellybean" Benitez had a quarter-inch, 15" tape machine, which led to Baker and Benitez creating the edit of "Planet Rock" at Benitez's home. Attempts to get a full-length album for Bambaataa were not possible with Tommy Boy as Silverman's contract with him was strictly for singles; re-negotiating the contract proved to be difficult. The followup single to "Planet Rock", "Looking for the Perfect Beat" was released in December 1982. A full-length album titled Planet Rock: The Album was released in 1986, which contained the three other singles "Looking for the Perfect Beat", "Renegades of Funk", "Frantic Situation", and three previously unreleased tracks.

On May 5, 1992, a remix Extended play (EP) was released by the group on Tommy Boy, which featured remixes by Karl Bartos, 808 State, DJ Magic Mike and LFO. Ron Wynn of AllMusic felt the remixes were unsuccessful, noting that "Planet Rock"'s "hook was old-school, as was its charm. The newer version lacks bite." Paul Oakenfold created a remix of "Planet Rock" for the soundtrack to the film Swordfish in 2001 which became Oakenfold's first charting single in the United Kingdom. Jason Birchmeier of AllMusic described Oakenfold's remix as turning the song into "a seven-minute breakbeat trance anthem -- something that would be considered downright blasphemous in many circles" The song was remixed again for the film 808 in 2015, featuring remixes by Kaytranada and Boys Noize.

== Reception ==
Contemporary reviews, in the United Kingdom, included one by Edwin Pouncey of Sounds who praised an import version of the song declaring it a "wiilldd paarrtty monster" which "once heard is never forgotten". The NME placed "Planet Rock" at 16th on their 1982 best of the year ranking. Nelson George of Billboard referred to the track as "one of the summer's biggest singles" in 1982. In The Village Voice's 1982 Pazz & Jop critics' poll, the single was voted the year's eighth best. Robert Christgau, the poll's supervisor, called it the year's "most influential dance record" and "potentially as influential as 'Rapper's Delight'". Lynden Barber of Melody Maker wrote in 1984 that the song was "probably the single most influential record of the Eighties" noting it spawned the electro-funk genre and that lead indirectly to a new "revolution" in how mainstream soul is conceived, recorded and mixed.

Robert Palmer of The New York Times called "Planet Rock" "perhaps the most influential black pop record of 1982", noting its influence on "both the black pop mainstream and several leading white new-wave rockers". Contemporary musicians of the period commented on the track, with rapper Melle Mel saying later that "Planet Rock" had "[h]urt all the other rappers" noting that Bambaataa and his crew were "the only ones to have this real futuristic, synthesized sound. It hurt us because it ripped everything into a different dimension."

Brian Chin of Billboard later said that Melle Mel and Duke Bootee's late 1982 track "The Message II" was influenced by "Planet Rock". Baker referred to the "mc popping" style that G.L.O.B.E. performed on the track as an influence on Run-DMC. Darryl "D.M.C." McDaniels said their group's song "It's Like That" was "basically a 'Planet Rock' flow over a beat". Before hearing "Planet Rock", Cosmo D of Newcleus who had recorded songs such as "Jam On's Revenge" and "Computer Age (Push the Button)" said after completing the track "Computer Age (Push the Button)" that he "started hearing this shit on the air, 'Planet Rock'. And I hear this shit, and I said, 'If that shit is a hit, I know "Computer Age" is a hit'."

In the United Kingdom, DJ Gerald Simpson (A Guy Called Gerald) said that going out dancing he started to hear "electro-ey stuff – 'Planet Rock' and Newcleus, that kind of vibe. That blew us away back then – dancing-wise it was perfect. Before that we were listening to jazz, funk and soul, where the music was all played live. But this stuff – you know exactly where the beat's gonna come, so dancing-wise you can experiment a bit more."

Norman Cook of The Housemartins began DJing at the age of 18 after hearing "Planet Rock". He said: "I wanted to make dance music, not white pop music." Cook would later find success under the alias of Fatboy Slim releasing albums such as You've Come a Long Way, Baby and platinum albums around the world. Stationed in the UK during 1980s, Mr. Mixx of 2 Live Crew said: "I thought, at the time, that it was the most profound record I'd ever heard. It was the crossover point between electronic dance music and R&B."

=== Retrospective ===
Frank Owen commented on "Planet Rock" in 1990 in Spin, referring to it as "year zero of the new dance music", noting that it was still a strong influence on American regional scenes with Miami bass, Detroit techno and Los Angeles hip hop. Owen noted that the influence of "Planet Rock" declined in New York where he believed that what was once was a "radical listening experience" had become "lost under the weight of endless imitations that followed in its wake".

John Bush, a writer for the AllMusic database praised the song, declaring that "no single encapsulates the electro era quite like Planet Rock", while finding that "[t]he rapping, though not up to later standards, does make an improvement on the rather lame rhymes and lack of rhythm from the first few rap singles to hit the market". François K, a musician, studio producer and engineer who has worked with Kraftwerk, Depeche Mode, Diana Ross and The Cure declared that "Planet Rock" was the song he most associated with New York in the early 1980s, adding that "there was nothing else that could touch that record [...] There was nothing that year that could top what 'Planet Rock' did."

In 2012, Rolling Stone polled 33 music journalists, executives and hip hop producers and rappers to create a list of the 50 greatest hip hop songs of all time. "Planet Rock" was placed at number three on the list, with Chuck D of Public Enemy proclaiming it "as important as Willie Mitchell or Booker T. were to the Memphis scene. There hasn't been a song like it in hip-hop since."

In 2020, Slant Magazine ranked it number 44 in their list of "The 100 Best Dance Songs of All Time". In 2022 and 2025, Rolling Stone and Billboard magazine ranked the song numbers 67 and 13 in their lists of the best dance songs of all time.

== Track listing ==
- 12" single (TB 823)
1. "Planet Rock (Vocal)" – 6:25
2. "Bonus Beats I" – 1:15
3. "Planet Rock (Instrumental)" – 9:16

== Credits ==
Credits adapted from the liner notes and expanded with information in the article. Robie is credited on the record as Planet Patrol.

- Arthur Baker – producer, mixing, composer, Fairlight CMI
- Tom Silverman – executive producer
- John Brunette – engineer
- Bob Rosa – engineer
- Herb Powers Jr. – mastering
- John Robie – composer, music, Micromoog and Prophet 5 synthesizers
- Soul Sonic Force – composer, vocals

== Charts ==
Chart (1982)	Peak position
UK Singles (OCC)	53
US Billboard Hot 100	48
US Dance/Disco Top 80 (Billboard)	3
US Hot Soul Singles (Billboard)	4

== Certifications ==
Region	Certification	Certified units/sales
United States (RIAA)	Gold	1,000,000^{^}
^{^} Shipments figures based on certification alone.

== See also ==
- 1982 in hip hop music
- Music of New York City
