= Planet Rock: The Album =

Planet Rock

Studio album by Afrika Bambaataa & Soulsonic Force
- Released: December 1, 1986
- Recorded: 1981–1986
- Genres: Electro; old school hip-hop; breakbeat
- Length: 46:09
- Label: Tommy Boy/Warner Bros.
- Producers: Arthur Baker; John Robie; Fats Comet Productions; Keith LeBlanc; Doug Wimbish; Skip McDonald

Afrika Bambaataa & Soulsonic Force chronology
Death Mix (1983)	Planet Rock (1986)	Beware (The Funk Is Everywhere) (1986)

Singles from Planet Rock: The Album
- 1. "Looking for the Perfect Beat" Released: January 1983; 2. "Renegades of Funk" Released: 1983

Professional ratings
Review scores
Source	Rating
AllMusic	4.5/5 stars
Christgau's Record Guide	A−

Planet Rock: The Album is an old school hip-hop album by Afrika Bambaataa & Soulsonic Force, released in 1986 as a collection of previous singles. The song "Planet Rock" was one of the earliest hits of the hip-hop genre and remains one of its pioneering recordings. The single's liner notes include members of Kraftwerk with the songwriting credits. In creating the track, portions of Kraftwerk's "Numbers" and "Trans-Europe Express" were interpolated (re-recorded in the studio, rather than through the use of a digital sampler), along with portions of songs by Captain Sky and Ennio Morricone.

== Legacy ==
The song "Planet Rock" was ranked by Rolling Stone magazine at #240 on its list of the 500 Greatest Songs of All Time, and went on to become the first gold-certified vinyl 12-inch single. Slant Magazine listed the album at #84 on its list of "Best Albums of the 1980s". The album was also included in the book 1001 Albums You Must Hear Before You Die. "Renegades of Funk", the third track, was covered by Rage Against the Machine on its 2000 album Renegades.

== Track listing ==
No.	Title	Writer(s)	Producer(s)	Length
1.	"Planet Rock"	Arthur Baker; John Robie; Afrika Bambaataa; John Miller; Ellis Williams; Robert Allen; Ralf Hütter; Florian Schneider; Emil Schult	Baker	7:31
2.	"Looking for the Perfect Beat"	Baker; Robie; Bambaataa; Miller; Williams; Allen	Baker; Robie	6:51
3.	"Renegades of Funk"	Baker; Robie; Bambaataa; Miller	Baker; Robie	6:45
4.	"Frantic Situation" (Frantic Mix)	Baker; Leroi Evans; Rae Serrano; William Henderson; Williams; Bambaataa; Wilfred Fowler; Miller; Allen	Baker, Robie	3:47
5.	"Who You Funkin' With?" (featuring Melle Mel)	Williams; Bambaataa; Doug Wimbish; Bernard Alexander; Keith LeBlanc; Miller; Allen; Melvin Glover	Bambaata; Fats Comet Productions	6:23
6.	"Go-Go Pop" (featuring Trouble Funk)	Williams; Allen; Miller; Bambaataa; Serrano; Evans	Serrano; Evans	6:00
7.	"They Made a Mistake" (performed by MC G.L.O.B.E. and Pow Wow)	Miller; Allen; LeBlanc; Wimbish; Alexander	Fats Comet Productions	5:30

== Personnel ==
- Arthur Baker – producer, mixing
- Keith LeBlanc – producer
- Herb Powers Jr. – mastering
- Latin Rascals – remixing
- Afrika Bambaataa – producer, mixing
- John Aquilino – illustrations, hand lettering
- Jay Burnett – mixing
- Albert Cabrera – remixing
- Skip McDonald – producer
- Tony Moran – remixing
- John Robie – producer, mixing
- LeRoi Evans – producer, mixing
- Rae Serrano – producer
- Adrian Sherwood – mixing
- Andy Wallace – mixing
- Doug Wimbish – producer
- Monica Lynch – art direction
- Steven Miglio – artwork, design
- Fats Comet – producer, mixing
- M.C. G.L.O.B.E. – additional vocals
