= DJ Sharaz =

American DJ and electronica producer

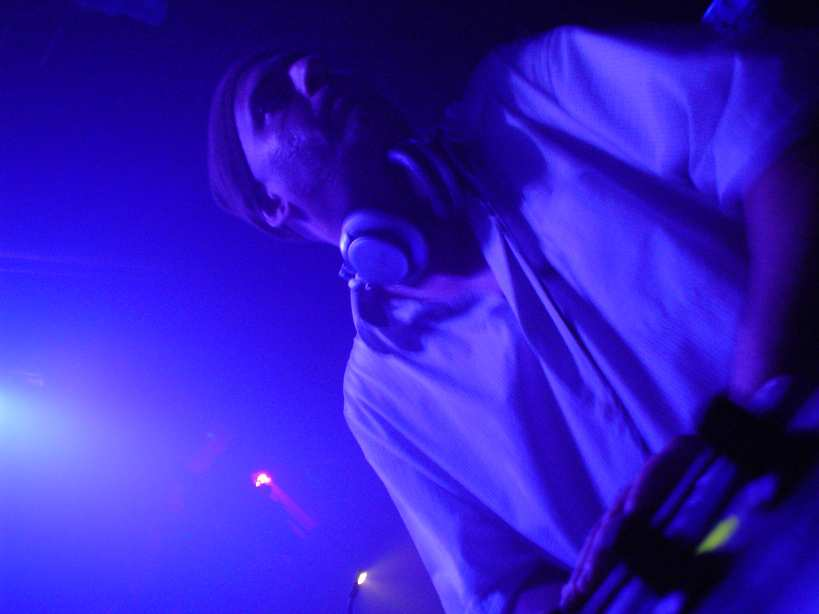

Background information
- Also known as: Sharaz
- Born: Anthony Sharaz; Cedarville, Michigan, United States
- Genres: Electronica; Florida breaks; breakbeat; alternative dance
- Occupations: Disc jockey; record producer; remixer
- Instruments: Synthesizer; drums; Ableton Live
- Years active: 1998–2005; 2010-present
- Label: Nine Four One Media

Anthony Sharaz, better known by his stage name DJ Sharaz, is a DJ and electronica producer in the Bradenton, FL area. He is originally from East Chicago, but in 1986 moved to Florida to attend college. His current company is NineFourOne Media and he holds a private pilot license.

His influences are largely soul/funk but also include: Eddie Kendricks, Isaac Hayes, Candi Staton, Otis Redding, Elvis Presley, Zapp, The Stylistics, O'Jays, Bill Withers, Lyrics Born, Sparlha Swa, Slave, Midnight Star, Stevie Wonder (pre-1980), Al Green, etc.

He has performed alongside acts such as Frankie Bones, Richard "Humpty" Vission, DJ Mea, Darude, DJ Rap, The Warp Brothers, The Bassbin Twins, Paul Oakenfold, DJ Baby Anne, Storm (UK), Dave London, D:Fuse, The Crystal Method, Reid Speed, and DJ Icey.

Remixes have been provided by Sharaz for Tommy Boy Records, POD Music, Kaleidoscope, DBI records, and StreetBeat Records. He has 36 records and nine compact discs released under his own independent label.

== History ==
His remix of Fierce Ruling Diva's "You Gotta Believe" spent a week at #1 on the Billboard Hot Dance Club Songs chart in 2002.

In 2007, Sharaz's track "Holdin' On" was an International Dance Music Awards nominee for Best Breaks/Electro track at the Winter Music Conference.

In August 2009, Sharaz began releasing a bi-weekly online mixcast named "Return to Planet Boom". In early 2010, Sharaz began producing and releasing new tracks again via SoundCloud, Beatport and iTunes.

In 2011, Sharaz resumed regular touring, and currently uses Ableton Live and an Ableton Push 2 MIDI controller, rather than CD players or turntables, as a basis for his live DJ sets. In August 2013, Sharaz released his first album in nearly nine years entitled "Been There Done That" consisting of entirely new material. In recent years, Sharaz has released two additional albums, "The Boogie Monster" in 2014 and "Unlike The Others" in 2019, the latter of which is a mixture of traditional breakbeat cuts and retro electro dance and synthwave music.

In 2014, Sharaz released a 260 track limited edition anthology flash drive entitled "Escape to Planet of the Bass", funded entirely by Kickstarter. 2015 brought a limited edition double vinyl, 8 track 12" release, also successfully funded by Kickstarter. Both projects were graphically themed as 1980's-era retro computer games.

In 2020, Featured in We Are The Breaks was an International Dance Music Awards nominee for Best Breaks/Electro track at the Ravesta Records.
