= Renegades of Funk =

1983 single by Soulsonic Force and Afrika Bambaataa

- Cover art by Bob Camp

Single by Afrika Bambaataa and the Soulsonic Force

from the album Planet Rock: The Album
- Released: 1983
- Recorded: 1983
- Studio: Unique Recording Studios, New York City
- Genre: Electro, hip hop
- Label: Tommy Boy/Warner Bros. Records
- Songwriters: Afrika Bambaataa, Arthur Baker, John Miller, John Robie
- Producers: Arthur Baker, John Robie

Afrika Bambaataa singles chronology
"Looking for the Perfect Beat" (1983)	"Renegades of Funk" (1983)	"Wild Style" (1983)

"Renegades of Funk" is a song written by Afrika Bambaataa, Arthur Baker, John Miller & John Robie and recorded by Afrika Bambaataa & Soulsonic Force. Released in 1983 as a single on the Tommy Boy label, it was also included on the 1986 album Planet Rock: The Album. The song is an eclectic fusion of electronic music and heavy percussion, with politically fused hip hop lyrics that draw a connection between past revolutionaries and bohemians to present-day street artists. It was produced and mixed by Arthur Baker and John Robie. Mastering was by Herb Powers Jr..

The song was used by the Toronto Raptors as its entrance song during home games in 2006. It is also featured as a track on the radio in the video game Grand Theft Auto: Vice City Stories. In 1985, the song was used in "The Maze", an episode in the first season of the television police drama Miami Vice. It was remade by Rage Against the Machine and released as a single in 2001. "Weird Al" Yankovic included Rage Against the Machine's version in his polka medley "Angry White Boy Polka" from his 2003 album Poodle Hat.

== Track listings ==
12" single (1983) – Tommy Boy (TB 839)

- A1 - "Renegades of Funk" (vocal) – 6:44
- A2 - "Renegades Chant" - 7:40
- B1 - "Renegades of Funk" (instrumental) – 6:20

CD maxi-single (1993) – Tommy Boy (TBCD 839)

- 1 - "Renegades of Funk" (vocal) – 6:44
- 2 - "Renegades Chant" - 7:40
- 3 - "Renegades of Funk" (instrumental) – 6:20

== Rage Against the Machine cover ==
"Renegades of Funk"

Single by Rage Against the Machine

from the album Renegades
- Released: February 20, 2001
- Genre: Rap metal, funk metal, nu metal
- Length: 4:35 (album version); 3:46 (radio edit)
- Label: Epic
- Songwriters: Afrika Bambaataa, Arthur Baker, John Miller, John Robie
- Producers: Rick Rubin, Rage Against the Machine

Rage Against the Machine singles chronology
"Testify" (2000)	"Renegades of Funk" (2001)	"How I Could Just Kill a Man" (2001)

Music video
- "Renegades of Funk" by Rage Against the Machine on YouTube

In 2000, American rock band Rage Against the Machine recorded the song for their cover album Renegades. In addition to lyrics by Afrika Bambaataa, it features a percussion interpolation of the Incredible Bongo Band's piece "Apache" and riffs from the Cheap Trick song "Gonna Raise Hell".

The group played the song live for the first time at its reunion show at Coachella 2007. This version of the song was the intro music to "The Big Mad Morning Show" on 92.1 The Beat in Tulsa, Oklahoma.

The music video directed by Steven Murashige was a montage of film stock-footage clips, as the band had broken up when the video was released. The montage consists mostly of funk and hip-hop music and events of the Civil Rights movements, interspersed with live footage of the Los Angeles Phantom Street Artist Joey Krebs spray-painting his infamous Outline Silhouettes of Figures mixed with media stills of individuals the song implies are renegades:

- Chief Sitting Bull: leader of the Hunkpapa Sioux.
- Thomas Paine: writer.
- Martin Luther King Jr.: activist.
- Malcolm X: national spokesman for the Nation of Islam.
- Muhammad Ali: boxer and civil rights activist.
- Paul Robeson: singer, actor, and communist activist.
- Richard Pryor: comedian.
- Gil Scott-Heron: poet and musician.
- The Last Poets: group of poets and musicians sympathetic with the civil rights movement.
- James Brown: gospel and rhythm and blues artist.
- Curtis Mayfield: soul, funk and rhythm and blues artist.
- Charles Wright & the Watts 103rd Street Rhythm Band: funk band.
- Sly and the Family Stone: funk band.
- George Clinton: funk artist.
- Parliament Funkadelic: funk music collective.
- DJ Kool Herc: hip-hop pioneer.
- Grandmaster Flash: hip-hop artist, DJ.
- Afrika Bambaataa: DJ, Bronx community leader, and the artist who wrote and performed the song.
- Kurtis Blow: hip-hop artist, DJ.
- Nat Turner: leader of the Southampton county slave rebellion.
- Huey Newton: co-founder of the Black Panther Party.
- Mumia Abu-Jamal: former Black Panther Party activist and political prisoner.
- Leonard Peltier: member of the American Indian Movement and political prisoner.
- Ernesto "Che" Guevara: communist guerilla leader.
- Stokeley Carmichael: leader of the Student Nonviolent Coordinating Committee.
- Marcus Garvey: founder of the Universal Negro Improvement Association and African Communities League.
- Angela Davis: activist and Black Panther.
- Rigoberta Menchú: human rights activist and 1992 Nobel Peace Prize recipient.
- Cesar Chavez: co-founder of the United Farm Workers.
- Susan B. Anthony: co-founder of the National Woman Suffrage Association.
- Rosa Parks: civil rights activist.
- Whodini: hip-hop group.
- Run-D.M.C.: hip-hop trio.
- LL Cool J: hip-hop artist.
- KDAY: hip-hop radio station.
- Ice-T: hip-hop artist and leader of the metal band Body Count.
- Roxanne Shanté: hip-hop artist.
- UTFO: hip-hop group.
- Tommie Smith, John Carlos, and Peter Norman: 1968 Summer Olympics athletes who were the main subjects of the infamous 1968 Olympics Black Power salute.
- Boogie Down Productions: hip-hop group.
- Beastie Boys: hip-hop group.
- Salt-n-Pepa: hip-hop group.
- Eric B. & Rakim: hip-hop duo.
- MC Lyte: hip-hop artist.
- Slick Rick: hip-hop artist.
- Big Daddy Kane: hip-hop artist
- EPMD: hip-hop duo.
- Public Enemy: hip-hop group.
- De La Soul: hip-hop trio.
- Queen Latifah: hip-hop artist, singer, talk-show host, and actress.
- Tone Lōc: hip-hop artist.
- N.W.A: hip-hop group.

=== Track listing ===
- CD single
1. "Renegades of Funk" (radio edit) – 3:54
2. "Renegades of Funk" (album version) – 4:35
