= Soulsonic Force =

American electrofunk/hip hop group

- Origin: New York
- Genres: Hip hop Freestyle
- Years active: 1980–present
- Label: Tommy Boy

Soulsonic Force (also referred to as Afrika Bambaataa & Soulsonic Force) is an American electro-funk and hip hop ensemble originally led by Afrika Bambaataa who helped establish hip-hop in the early 1980s with songs such as "Planet Rock." They were also influential in the birth of the electro movement in America and helped pave the way for modern dance music styles such as electro-funk as well as the entire Miami bass scene.

== History ==
In 1982, Soulsonic Force and Afrika Bambaataa released a single "Planet Rock." The song borrowed musical motifs from German electro-pop, British rock and African-American disco rap. All the different elements and musical styles were blended together; and in doing so, offered hip hop as a new vision for global harmony. The song became an immediate hit and stormed the music charts worldwide.

Their other well-known songs include "Looking for the Perfect Beat" and "Renegades of Funk" (which is one of the earliest political-conscious rap songs, alongside Grandmaster Flash & the Furious Five's "The Message").

Soulsonic Force features on the title track of the Freestylers' debut album, We Rock Hard.

Pow Wow died from emphysema and complications of chronic obstructive pulmonary disease on April 4, 2025, at the age of 63.

Afrika Bataambaa died of complications from cancer on April 9, 2026 at the age of 68.

== Lineup ==
- Afrika Bambaataa (Name: Lance Taylor; passed in 2026)
- Mr. Biggs (Name: Ellis Williams)
- Pow Wow (Name: Robert Darrell Allen; passed in 2025)
- The G.L.O.B.E (Name: John Miller)
- DJ Jazzy Jay (Name: John Byas)

== Discography ==
=== Albums ===
- Planet Rock: The Album (1986)
- "Planet Rock" (Swordfish Mix) on the Swordfish soundtrack (see Swordfish).

=== Singles ===
Year	Single	Peak positions				Album
Year	Single	US	US Dance	US R&B	UK	Album
1982	"Planet Rock"	48	—	4	53	Planet Rock - The Album
1982	"Looking for the Perfect Beat"	—	18	36	86	Planet Rock - The Album
1983	"Renegades of Funk"	—	26	—	30	Planet Rock - The Album
1984	"Frantic Situation"	—	—	—	89	Planet Rock - The Album
1989	"Return to Planet Rock (The Second Coming)" (feat. Jungle Brothers) (US only)	—	—	—	—	
1992	"Don't Stop... Planet Rock (The Remix EP)"	—	30	—	—	
1996	"Planet Rock '96" (US only)	—	—	—	—	Lost Generation
1998	"Looking for the Perfect Beat '98" (US only)	—	36	—	—	
1998	"Planet Rock '98" (Europe only)	—	—	—	—	
1999	"Who's in the House" (UK only)	—	—	—	—	
2001	"Planet Rock (Remixes) '01" (as Paul Oakenfold presents Afrika Bambaataa & The Soulsonic Force)	—	—	—	47	
"—" denotes releases that did not chart or were not released.
