= Jazzy Jay =

American DJ and producer (born 1961)

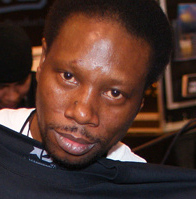
- Jazzy Jay in 2009

Background information
- Also known as: The Original Jazzy Jay; DJ Jazzy Jay
- Born: John Byas; November 18, 1961 (age 65); Beaufort, South Carolina, U.S.
- Origin: The Bronx, New York City, U.S.
- Genre: Hip hop
- Occupations: DJ; turntablism
- Label: Strong City

John Byas (born November 18, 1961), also known as The Original Jazzy Jay or DJ Jazzy Jay, is an American hip hop DJ and producer.

== Background ==
Jazzy Jay was born into a Gullah family in coastal South Carolina. He moved with his family to Soundview, Bronx in New York City at a young age and took up the drums, his first instrument. His first drum was a Roland drum machine. He began his career in hip hop in the 1970s in The Bronx, New York, the epicenter of hip hop culture during the first decade of its development, at the age of 13. An early member of Afrika Bambaataa's Universal Zulu Nation, he was a protégé of Bambaataa as well as his older cousin, Kool DJ Red Alert. Beginning as a Zulu King dancer in the early 1970s, Jay later became a Universal Zulu Nation DJ and was a member of the Zulu group Jazzy Five, with which he recorded the single "Jazzy Sensation."

Although Jazzy Jay began performing primarily at street parties, in the 1980s he began DJing in New York clubs such as Negril, the Roxy, the Ritz, and Danceteria. He also hosted a hip hop radio program on WRKS 98.7 Kiss FM and in 1984 he played himself as The Roxy's DJ in the influential hip hop film Beat Street.

Jazzy Jay and Afrika Islam performed some of the first DJ team routines and teamed up to battle both Grandmaster Flash (solo) and Grand Wizard Theodore (solo).

== Origin of Def Jam Recordings ==
Around 1984, Jay met Rick Rubin and assisted him in laying the foundation for what would become Def Jam Recordings. The label's first official single was the single "It's Yours" by T La Rock and Jazzy Jay. Jay later introduced Rubin to Russell Simmons, creating one of the most important partnerships in hip hop production. Jazzy Jay also put out Def Jam's third 12" in 1985, entitled "Def Jam" b/w "Cold Chillin' In The Spot", which featured Russell Simmons on vocals. In 1986, he participated in the recording Planet Rock - The Album, which was certified gold.

Also a producer, Jay founded Jazzy Jay's Studio in the Bronx, where he produced early recordings by Diamond D, Fat Joe, Brand Nubian, A Tribe Called Quest, and others. He also began his own label, Strong City Records, through a partnership with Rocky Bucano.

== 21st century ==
More recently, Jazzy Jay was featured in the 2001 turntablism documentary Scratch. In the film, he displays his extensive LP collection (kept in the basement of his home), which he claims comprises at least 300,000 to 400,000 records.

In 2000, Jazzy Jay was inducted into the Technics/DMC DJ Hall of Fame. He sometimes performs together with another hip hop pioneer, Grand Wizard Theodore. He is also interviewed extensively in the 2003 hip hop documentary 5 Sides of a Coin.He was featured in the 2004 song "Rock And Roll (Could Never Hip Hop Like This) Part 2" by Handsome Boy Modeling School giving a background on himself and on rap as an art form.

Jazzy Jay narrated a walking tour of The Bronx, "Hip Hop," by Soundwalk, that won the 2004 Audie award for Best Original Work.

He and his wife have three children (Jazmine, Matthew, and Kenya), and live in Bedford–Stuyvesant, Brooklyn, New York. Matthew Byas is a member of Brooklyn musical group Phony Ppl. In 2011, Jazmine graduated from the prestigious Eastman School of Music, and is pursuing a career as a classical oboist. In 2014, she married Danny Lambert, of Bray, County Wicklow, Ireland.
