= Universal Zulu Nation =

International hip hop awareness group

Current Zulu Nation logo.

Former Zulu Nation logo

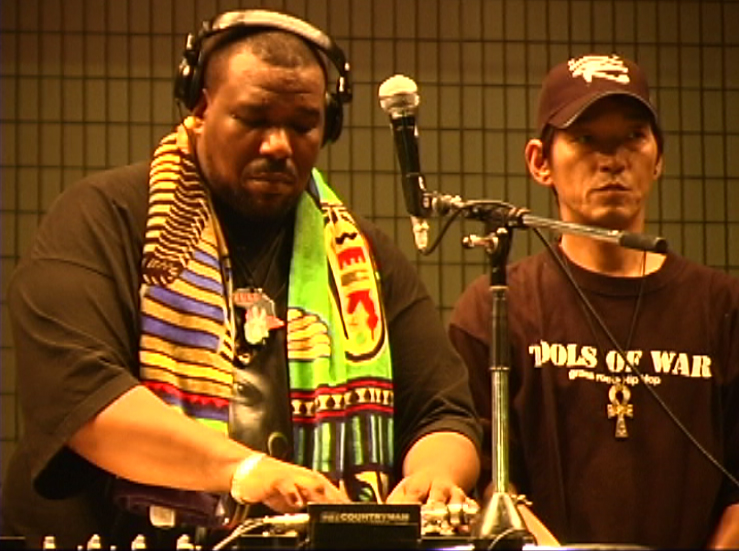
Afrika Bambaataa (left) with DJ Yutaka of Zulu Nation Japan, 2004.

The Universal Zulu Nation is an international hip hop awareness group formed by electro/hip hop artist Afrika Bambaataa.

According to the website of the UZN, the Zulu Nation stands for "knowledge, wisdom, understanding, freedom, justice, equality, peace, unity, love, respect, work, fun, overcoming the negative to the positive, economics, mathematics, science, life, truth, facts, faith, and the oneness of god".

== History ==
Originally known simply as the Organization, it arose in the 1970s from the reformed New York City gang the Black Spades, a street gang from the South Bronx. While the Black Spades were the base of the organization, other reformed gangs contributed additional members, notably the Savage Nomads, Seven Immortals, and Savage Skulls, among others. Members began to organize cultural events for youths, combining local dance and music movements into what would become known as the various elements of hip hop culture. Elements of the culture include Emceeing (MCing), Deejaying (DJing), breaking (Breakdancing), and writing (Graffiti).

In many interviews, Afrika Bambaataa has spoken of the name "Zulu" as being inspired by the 1964 film of the same name.

The imagery of the Zulu Nation has varied at times as well. During the 1970s and the 1980s, Afrika Bambaataa and the Zulu Nation members would often clothe themselves in costumes representing different cultures of the world.

Since the early 1980s, the Zulu Nation has established autonomous branches in Japan, France, the UK, Australia, Canada, South Korea and the Cape Flats in Cape Town South Africa.

From the late 1980s, at the height of the Afrocentric movement in Hip Hop (when artists such as KRS-One, Public Enemy, A Tribe Called Quest, Native Tongues, and Rakim hit success), the movement seemed to be incorporating many doctrines from the Nation of Islam, the Nation of Gods and Earths, and the Nuwaubians. In the mid-1990s, some members began to break off starting their own projects or organizations such as "Ill Crew Universal".

=== Disassociation from Afrika Bambaataa ===
Afrika Bambaataa stood down as head of the Zulu Nation in May 2016 after allegations of sexually abusing several young men and children in the organization. Ronald Savage was the first of several men to publicly accuse Bambaataa.

In June 2016, Universal Zulu Nation, which previously defended Bambaataa and even suggested that one of his accusers was "mentally challenged," issued a letter confirming the change in the organization's stance towards Bambaataa's sex abuse allegations and offering an apology, stating, among other things, that "We extend our deepest and most sincere apologies to the many people who have been hurt by the actions of Afrika Bambaataa and the subsequent poor response of our organisation to allegations levelled against him." This apology letter was signed by nearly three dozen members of the Zulu Nation, including leaders from as far as New Zealand.

In 2017, hundreds of Zulus resigned due to distrust of the Zulu Nation and founded their own organization, the Zulu Union.

== Zulu Nation in France ==
The Zulu movement was introduced to France in 1982 by Afrika Bambaataa when the New York City Rap Tour performed in several cities (Paris, Lyon, Metz, Belfort, Mulhouse) with artists PHASE 2, Futura 2000, Dondi, Grandmaster D.ST, the Rock Steady Crew, Rammellzee, the double dutch group Buffalo Girls. The Zulu Nation was centered in suburban Paris since most immigrants lived beyond the city limits. Since 1987, the Zulu Nation's ties to the French hip hop community have waned. Since Afrika Bambaataa's tour of France in 2008 and a Zulu Nation reunion in Paris, new movements of the Universal Zulu Nation have emerged in different cities in France. According to Veronique Henelon, "French rap specifically has been a multi-dimensional expression of ties with Africa." The first Hip Hop television show reportedly appeared in France. It was called 'H.I.P. H.O.P.' and was aired by the TF1 channel in 1984.

During the 80's the French Chapter of the UZN spread The Culture further than just their own borders. One of the greatest tools of spreading The Message was a fanzine called "The Zulu Letters".

It was through this fanzine that Zulu Chapters, new and old, got introduced to each other. The zine was run by amongst others Queen Candy and King Skull.

Queen Candy was the link to Africa and assisted with the first Chapter being launched on the Cape Flats in Cape Town, South Africa, specifically Mitchell's Plain. King Jamo was/is the King, of now dormant Chapter, in Mitchell's Plain with the area's first 2 Chapters being in Eastridge and Westridge with Shy aka thEshYonE being the King of Westridge.

Through "The Zulu Letter" links were made with UZN Chapters all around the World, including Australia, where Broke and Boesta were the Kings in the early 90's.

== Notable members and affiliates ==
- 9th Wonder
- Afrika Baby Bam
- Ali Shaheed Muhammad
- Big Boi
- Bronx Style Bob
- Caslu
- Chi-Ali
- Darryl McDaniels
- Trugoy (deceased)
- Deph Paul
- DJ Fuze (Councillor Richard MacRae)
- Dondi (deceased)
- Dres
- Fab Five Freddy
- Fat Joe
- Freddie Gibbs
- Futura 2000
- Ice Cube
- Ice-T
- Immortal Technique
- Jam Master Jay (deceased)
- Jarobi White
- Joeystarr
- Joseph Simmons
- Posdnuos
- King Sun XL
- Kool Moe Dee
- KRS-One
- Kurtis Blow
- Lil Wayne (reportedly)
- Lord-Yoda-X (deceased)
- Lovebug Starski (deceased)
- Makakuvu Ali El Bey
- MC Spice
- Mick Benzo
- Mike Gee
- Mista Lawnge
- Monie Love
- Petawane
- Phase 2 (deceased)
- Phife Dawg (deceased)
- Prince Whipper Whip
- Q-Tip
- Queen Latifah
- Rakaa
- Russell Simmons
- Sammy B
- Sol Messiah
- Spoonie Gee
- Torch
- Maseo
- Zulu King Flowrex
