= Five Steez =

Five Steez is an independent underground hip hop artist from Kingston, Jamaica. He began making a name for himself with his 'Momentum' mixtape series in 2010 and then his debut album, 'War for Peace', in August 2012. The album was well received by hip hop websites as well as the Jamaican print media, which labelled it an unexpected landmark release from Jamaica. In October 2014, he released his EP, 'These Kingston Times', to equally rave reviews, followed by 2016's EP, 'HeatRockz'. He also organized Kingston, Jamaica's premier Hip Hop event, Pay Attention, from 2012 - 2015, with the local Hip Hop collective, The council, of which he is one-fourth. In 2019, he returned with the Mordecai-produced album, 'Love N Art', a campaign covered by the national newspaper, The Gleaner. Steez followed up 'Love N Art', with his second release for 2019, the EP 'Pantone', with French beatmaker J-Zen. In 2020, he released a sequel to his first EP with Mordecai, HeatRockz 2.0. For 2021, Five Steez teamed up with Brazilian producer SonoTWS for the album Quietude. Five Steez has been noted by The FADER as dominating Kingston's underground for some time.

== Discography ==
Albums

- 2012: War for Peace
- 2019: Love N Art (w/ Mordecai)
- 2021: Quietude (w/ SonoTWS)
- 2023: Re:DEFined (w/ Son Raw)

EPs

- 2013: War for Peace (Remix EP)
- 2014: These Kingston Times
- 2016: HeatRockz (w/ Mordecai)
- 2019: Pantone (w/ J-Zen)
- 2020: HeatRockz 2.0 (w/ Mordecai)
- 2025: The Test of Time (w/ Son Raw)

Mixtapes

- 2010: The Momentum: Volume One (w/ DJ Ready Cee)
- 2011: Yard Rebel (w/ DJ MadLogic)
- 2011: The Momentum: Volume Two (w/ DJ Ready Cee)
- 2016: The Momentum: Volume Three (w/ DJ Ready Cee)

with The Council

- 2016: Forgotten Parables (EP)
- 2017: Nothing Else Matters (Album)
- 2021: Trilogy (Album)
