= Kool Moe Dee discography =

- Studio albums: 5
- Compilation albums: 3
- Singles: 22

This is the discography of Kool Moe Dee, an American recording artist from New York City.

A former the Treacherous Three member, Kool Moe Dee has released five solo studio albums, three compilation albums, thirty-four singles (including seventeen as featured artist).

== Albums ==
=== Studio albums ===
List of studio albums, with selected chart positions, sales figures and certifications
Title	Album details	Peak chart positions			Sales	Certifications
Title	Album details	US	US R&B /HH	NLD	Sales	Certifications
Kool Moe Dee	Released: 1986; Label: Jive; Formats: CD, LP, cassette, digital download, streaming	83	20	44	US: 300,000	
How Ya Like Me Now	Released: November 3, 1987; Label: Jive; Format: CD, LP, cassette, digital download streaming	35	4	—		RIAA: Platinum
Knowledge Is King	Released: May 12, 1989; Label: Jive; Format: CD, LP, cassette, digital download, streaming	25	2	—		RIAA: Gold
Funke, Funke Wisdom	Released: June 4, 1991; Label: Jive; Format: CD, LP, cassette, digital download, streaming	72	19	—		
Interlude	Released: November 8, 1994; Label: Wrap/Ichiban; Format: CD, LP, cassette	—	64	—		
"—" denotes a recording that did not chart or was not released in that territory.

=== Compilation albums ===
Title	Album details
The Greatest Hits (Note: Also compiles works with Treacherous Three.)	Released: 1991; Label: Sugar Hill; Formats: CD, cassette
Greatest Hits	Released: August 10, 1993; Label: Jive; Formats: CD, LP, cassette, digital download, streaming
The Jive Collection, Vol. 2	Released: June 27, 1995; Label: Jive; Formats: CD, cassette
Back to the Old School: Turn It Up	Released: July 11, 2000; Label: Sequel; Formats: CD
I'm Kool Moe Dee	Released: March 29, 2005; Label: Sony BMG; Formats: CD

== Extended plays ==
List of extended plays
Title	EP details
African Pride	Released: May 23, 1990; Label: Jive; Formats: LP, cassette

== Singles ==
=== As lead artist ===
List of singles with selected chart positions, showing year released and album name
Title	Year	Peak chart positions							Album
Title	Year	US	US Dance	US R&B	US Rap	BEL	NLD	UK	Album
"Turn It Up" (Note: Published as "Kool Mo Dee") (Note: "Turn It Up" was released as a split single with "U.F.O" by Treacherous Three.)	1985	—	—	—	*	—	—	—	We Will Rap You
"Go See the Doctor"	1986	89	—	—	*	7	3	82	Kool Moe Dee
"The Down Beat" (Note: "The Down Beat" was released as a split single with "Christmas Rap" by Treacherous Three.)	1987	—	—	—	*	—	—	—	We Will Rap You
"Dumb Dick (Richard)"	1987	—	—	—	*	—	—	—	Kool Moe Dee
"Do You Know What Time It Is?"	1987	—	—	—	*	—	—	—	Kool Moe Dee
"Rock Steady"	1987	—	—	—	*	—	—	—	Kool Moe Dee
"How Ya Like Me Now"	1987	—	— (Note: "How Ya Like Me Now" did not enter the Dance Club Songs, but peaked at number 48 on the Dance/Electronic Singles Sales.)	22	*	—	—	86	How Ya Like Me Now
"Wild Wild West"	1988	62	— (Note: "Wild Wild West" did not enter the Dance Club Songs, but peaked at number 5 on the Dance/Electronic Singles Sales.)	4	*	—	—	—	How Ya Like Me Now
"No Respect"	1988	—	— (Note: "No Respect/Let's Go" did not enter the Dance Club Songs, but peaked at number 7 on the Dance/Electronic Singles Sales.)	—	*	—	—	—	How Ya Like Me Now
"Let's Go"	1988	—	—	11	*	—	—	—	A Nightmare on Elm Street 5: The Dream Child Soundtrack and Knowledge Is King
"They Want Money"	1989	—	— (Note: "They Want Money" did not enter the Dance Club Songs, but peaked at number 11 on the Dance/Electronic Singles Sales.)	3	2	—	—	91	Knowledge Is King
"I Go to Work"	1989	—	23	13	5	—	—	—	Knowledge Is King
"All Night Long"	1989	—	—	70	—	—	—	—	Knowledge Is King
"God Made Me Funke"	1990	—	—	44	10	—	—	—	African Pride
"Rise N Shine" (featuring KRS-One and Chuck D)	1991	—	—	—	1	—	—	—	Funke, Funke Wisdom
"How Kool Can One Black Man Be"	1991	—	—	49	9	—	—	—	Funke, Funke Wisdom
"Death Blow"	1991	—	—	—	—	—	—	—	Funke, Funke Wisdom
"Can U Feel It"	1993	—	—	—	—	—	—	—	Greatest Hits
"I Go to Work (Bad Boy Bill's Vocal Mix)" (Note: "I Go to Work (Bad Boy Bill's Vocal Mix)" was released as a split single with "Go Ahead in the Rain (Pimp Juice's Player's Paradise)" and "Footprints (Doc's Big Booty Retro Mix)" by A Tribe Called Quest under the title "Old School Vs. New School".)	1999	—	— (Note: "I Go to Work (Bad Boy Bill's Vocal Mix)" did not enter the Dance Club Songs, but peaked at number 45 on the Dance/Electronic Singles Sales.)	—	—	—	—	—	Old School vs. New School
"Brand New Heat"	2016	—	—	—	—	—	—	—	Non-album singles
"Recorded Live at Harlem World's Xmas Rappers Convention 1981" (as Kool Moe Dee vs. Busy Bee Starski)	2016	—	—	—	—	—	—	—	Non-album singles
"Game Time" (featuring N'chelle Genovese, Billy Urban & Lavaba)	2016	—	—	—	—	—	—	—	Non-album singles
"N-Otis" (with Grandmaster Caz)	2016	—	—	—	—	—	—	—	Non-album singles
"Are You Beautiful?" (with Steve Arrington)	2018	—	—	—	—	—	—	—	Non-album singles
"Shut It Up"	2020	—	—	—	—	—	—	—	Non-album singles
"—" denotes a recording that did not chart or was not released in that territory.

=== As featured artist ===
List of singles as featured artist, with selected chart positions and certifications, showing year released and album name
Title	Year	Peak chart positions												Certifications	Album
Title	Year	US Hot 100	US Dance	US R&B	US Rap	AUS	BEL	GER	ITA	NLD	NZ	SWI	UK	Certifications	Album
"Self Destruction" (as part of Stop the Violence Movement)	1989	—	— (Note: "Self Destruction" did not enter the Dance Club Songs, but peaked at number 7 on the Dance/Electronic Singles Sales.)	30	1	—	—	—	—	—	33	—	75	RIAA: Gold	Non-album single
"Wild Wild West" (Will Smith featuring Kool Moe Dee & Dru Hill)	1999	1	—	3	1	8	3	3	5	2	2	2	2	RIAA: Gold; ARIA: Gold; BPI: Silver; BVMI: Gold; RMNZ: Gold	Wild Wild West Soundtrack and Willennium
"Next Level" (Pablo featuring Kool Moe Dee) (Note: "Next Level" was released as a split single with "Short Stuff" by Ictus.)	2003	—	—	—	—	—	—	—	—	—	—	—	—		Non-album single
"Downtown" (Macklemore & Ryan Lewis featuring Eric Nally, Melle Mel, Kool Moe Dee and Grandmaster Caz)	2015	12	47	6	4	1	6	30	33	35	3	48	11	RIAA: Platinum; ARIA: 5× Platinum; BEA: Gold; BPI: Platinum; RMNZ: Platinum	This Unruly Mess I've Made
"—" denotes a recording that did not chart or was not released in that territory.

== Guest appearances ==
List of non-single guest appearances, with other performing artists, showing year released and album name
Title	Year	Other artist(s)	Album
"Come Together"	1988	The Isley Brothers	Spend the Night
"Back On the Block"	1989	Quincy Jones, Big Daddy Kane, Ice-T, Melle Mel	Back on the Block
"Jazz Corner of the World"	1989	Quincy Jones, Big Daddy Kane	Back on the Block
"Family Got to Get Busy"	1991	Salt-N-Pepa, Grand Daddy I.U., Ms. Melodie, Ziggy Marley, Kid Capri, DMC, KRS-One, Chuck D, Doug E. Fresh, Red Alert	Civilization Vs. Technology
"Good Time"	1992		Zebrahead (soundtrack)
"Tango In Paris"	1994	Regina Belle	Passion
"Rapper's Delight"	1994	Daddy-O, Hi-C	CB4 (soundtrack)
"Love Love"	1998		Black Rotation
"What You Wanna Do"	2000		Black Butta: The Unreleased Tracks of Hip Hop
"Rockin' Wit Da Best"	2010	Redman	Reggie

== Non-musical releases ==
- "Ebony Moments with Kool Moe Dee" (2012, Ebony.com)
