= The Jive Collection, Vol. 2 =

Compilation album by Kool Moe Dee
- Released: June 27, 1995
- Recorded: 1986–1991
- Genre: Hip hop
- Length: 55:47
- Label: Jive
- Producers: Robert Wells (exec.); LaVaba Mallison (also exec.); Bryan "Chuck" New; Teddy Riley

Kool Moe Dee chronology
Interlude (1994)	The Jive Collection, Vol. 2 (1995)

Professional ratings
Review scores
Source	Rating
Allmusic	4.5/5 stars
Robert Christgau	B+

The Jive Collection, Vol. 2 is a third compilation album by American rapper Kool Moe Dee. It was released on June 27, 1995, through Jive Records, making it his second compilation album on the label. It is composed of twelve songs from Kool Moe Dee's previous albums: Kool Moe Dee (1986), How Ya Like Me Now (1987), Knowledge Is King (1989), Funke, Funke Wisdom (1991) and Greatest Hits (1993).

== Track listing ==
No.	Title	Length
1.	"Go See the Doctor" (from Kool Moe Dee, 1986)	5:31
2.	"Do You Know What Time It Is?" (from Kool Moe Dee, 1986)	4:15
3.	"How Ya Like Me Now" (from How Ya Like Me Now, 1987)	5:34
4.	"Wild Wild West" (from How Ya Like Me Now, 1987)	4:42
5.	"Let's Go" (from Knowledge Is King, 1989)	5:23
6.	"They Want Money" (from Knowledge Is King, 1989)	3:52
7.	"I Go to Work" (from Knowledge Is King, 1989)	4:41
8.	"Knowledge is King" (from Knowledge Is King, 1989)	3:39
9.	"Funke Wisdom" (from Funke, Funke Wisdom, 1991)	3:29
10.	"The Avenue" (from Knowledge Is King, 1989)	3:49
11.	"Death Blow" (from Funke, Funke Wisdom, 1991)	6:37
12.	"Look at Me Now" (from Greatest Hits, 1993)	4:15
Total length:		55:47
