= Greatest Hits (Kool Moe Dee album) =

Compilation album by Kool Moe Dee

Greatest hits album by Kool Moe Dee
- Released: August 10, 1993
- Recorded: 1986–1993
- Studios: Battery Studios (New York, NY); Soundtrack Studios (New York, NY)
- Genre: Hip hop
- Length: 1:13:19
- Labels: Jive; BMG Records
- Producers: Bryan "Chuck" New; Hula & K. Fingers; Gerrold Holmes; Kool Moe Dee; LaVaba Mallison; Pete Q. Harris; Robert Wells; Teddy Riley

Kool Moe Dee chronology
Funke, Funke Wisdom (1991)	Greatest Hits (1993)	Interlude (1994)

Professional ratings
Review scores
Source	Rating
AllMusic	5/5 stars
Robert Christgau	B+

Greatest Hits is a second greatest hits album by American rapper Kool Moe Dee. It was released in 1993 through Jive Records, making it his first compilation album on the label. The album collects Kool Moe Dee's most popular singles recorded from 1986 to 1991 during his career with Jive Records and also contains four newly recorded songs: "Gimme My Props", "Look At Me Now", "Whosgotdaflava" and "Can U Feel It", which was also released as a single.

== Track listing ==
No.	Title	Writer(s)	Producer(s)	Length
1.	"Wild Wild West" (from How Ya Like Me Now, 1987)	M. Dewese	Bryan "Chuck" New; LaVaba Mallison; Kool Moe Dee; Pete Q. Harris	4:43
2.	"Go See the Doctor" (from Kool Moe Dee, 1986)	M. Dewese	Bryan "Chuck" New; LaVaba Mallison; Kool Moe Dee; Pete Q. Harris; Robert Wells; Teddy Riley	5:34
3.	"God Made Me Funke" (non-album single, 1990)	M. Dewese; G. Holmes	Gerrold Holmes; LaVaba Mallison; Kool Moe Dee	4:42
4.	"I Go to Work" (from Knowledge Is King, 1989)	M. Dewese	LaVaba Mallison; Kool Moe Dee; Pete Q. Harris; Teddy Riley	4:43
5.	"Whosgotdaflava"	M. Dewese; C. Simpkins; L. Mahone	Hula & K. Fingers	4:26
6.	"Let's Go" (from Knowledge Is King, 1989)	M. Dewese	LaVaba Mallison; Kool Moe Dee; Fred McFarlane (co.)	5:25
7.	"Death Blow" (from Funke, Funke Wisdom, 1991)	M. Dewese	Kool Moe Dee; Teddy Riley	6:38
8.	"Can U Feel It"	M. Dewese; C. Simpkins; L. Mahone	Hula & K. Fingers	4:41
9.	"How Ya Like Me Now" (from How Ya Like Me Now, 1987)	M. Dewese; T. Riley	Bryan "Chuck" New; LaVaba Mallison; Kool Moe Dee; Pete Q. Harris	5:37
10.	"Do You Know What Time It Is?" (from Kool Moe Dee, 1986)	M. Dewese	Bryan "Chuck" New; LaVaba Mallison; Kool Moe Dee; Pete Q. Harris; Robert Wells; Teddy Riley	4:16
11.	"They Want Money" (from Knowledge Is King, 1989)	M. Dewese; T. Riley	LaVaba Mallison; Kool Moe Dee; Pete Q. Harris; Teddy Riley	3:54
12.	"Gimme My Props"	M. Dewese	Kool Moe Dee; Dale Hogan (co.); Keith Spencer (co.)	4:49
13.	"Rise 'N' Shine" (from Funke, Funke Wisdom, 1991)	M. Dewese; L. Parker; C. Ridenhour	Kool Moe Dee	5:25
14.	"No Respect" (from How Ya Like Me Now, 1987)	M. Dewese; T. Riley	Bryan "Chuck" New; LaVaba Mallison; Kool Moe Dee; Pete Q. Harris; Teddy Riley	4:13
15.	"Look at Me Now"	M. Dewese	Kool Moe Dee; Dale Hogan (co.); Keith Spencer (co.)	4:13
Total length:				1:13:19

Sample credits

- "Whosgotdaflava" contains elements from "Think (About It)" by Lyn Collins (1972) and "Scenario (Remix)" by A Tribe Called Quest (1992)
- "Gimme My Props" contains elements from "Russian Dressing "Adorno Ruso"" by Walter Murphy (1976)
- "Look at Me Now" contains elements from "Sing a Simple Song" by Sly & the Family Stone (1968)

== Personnel ==
- Mohandes Dewese – vocals, producer (tracks: 1–4, 6–7, 9–15)
- Carlton Douglas Ridenhour – vocals (track 13)
- Lawrence Parker – vocals (track 13)
- Lamar Hula Mahone – backing vocals (track 5), producer (tracks: 5, 8)
- Craig Simpkins – backing vocals (track 5), producer (tracks: 5, 8)
- Maurice Joshua – backing vocals (track 5)
- Ardria Pittman – backing vocals (track 8)
- Walter Phillips – backing vocals (track 8)
- Bryan "Chuck" New – producer (tracks: 1–2, 9–10, 14), mixing (tracks: 1, 9, 14)
- LaVaba Mallison – producer (tracks: 1–4, 6, 9–11, 14), mixing (tracks: 4, 11)
- Edward Theodore Riley – producer (tracks: 2, 4, 7, 10, 11, 14)
- Peter Brian Harris – producer (tracks: 1–2, 4, 9–11, 14)
- Robert Wells – producer (tracks: 2, 10)
- Gerrold Holmes – producer (track 3)
- Fred Craig MacFarlane – co-producer (track 6)
- Keith Spencer – co-producer (tracks: 12, 15)
- Dale Hogan – co-producer (tracks: 12, 15)
- George Karras – mixing (track 4, 11), recording (track 3)
- Stephen George – mixing & recording (tracks: 5, 8)
- Chris Trevett – mixing (tracks: 12, 15)
- Barbera Aimes – mixing (track 3)
- Eric Gast – mixing (track 3)
- Tim Latham – recording (tracks: 12, 15)
- Tom Coyne – mastering
- Barron Ricks – scratches (track 3)
