= Beat Street (soundtrack) =

Beat Street (Original Motion Picture Soundtrack) – Volumes 1 & 2

Soundtrack album by various artists
- Released: 1984 (U.S.); 1984 (Canada, Germany, Italy)
- Studios: Unique Recording Studios, New York City
- Genres: Old school rap, boogie, electro, breakdance music
- Length: 79.28 (total); 40:55, 38:73
- Labels: Atlantic 80154 (Volume I.); Atlantic 80158 (Volume II.)
- Producers: Arthur Baker, Harry Belafonte

Beat Street (Original Motion Picture Soundtrack) – Volume 1 and Beat Street (Original Motion Picture Soundtrack) – Volume 2 are soundtrack albums for the 1984 drama film of the same name. They were released in 1984 by Atlantic Records. Both albums were produced by Harry Belafonte, a calypso artist best known for his 1956 hit "Day-O (The Banana Boat Song)", and prolific freestyle music producer and remixer Arthur Baker, who collaborated with music artists including Freeez, Afrika Bambaataa and New Order.

Both albums entered the Billboard 200 and R&B Albums charts and stayed there in the same year.

== Production ==
The soundtrack contains music mainly from old-school hip-hop artists including Grandmaster Melle Mel and the Furious Five, Jazzy Jay, Afrika Bambaataa & the Soulsonic Force and Treacherous Three featuring beatbox pioneer Doug E. Fresh but also various electro/boogie musicians such as Freeez, the System and Juicy.

The first volume was certified gold by the Recording Industry Association of America in the same year becoming the first rap/hip-hop album to so. A third volume was planned but it was never released. The second volume was never released on CD.

== Track listing ==
=== Volume 1 (80154) ===
A-side

#	^{Title}	^{Artist(s)}	^{Writer(s)}	^{Producer(s)}	^{Length}
A1	"Beat Street Breakdown"	Grandmaster Melle Mel & The Furious Five	Melvin Glover, Reggie Griffin	Melle Mel, Sylvia Robinson	6:48
A2	"Baptise the Beat"	The System	David Frank, Mic Murphy	David Frank, Michael Murphy	4:25
A3	"Strangers in a Strange World" (Love Theme From Beat Street)	Jenny Burton & Patrick Jude	Jake Holmes	Jake Holmes	4:25
A4	"Frantic Situation"	Afrika Bambaataa; The Soul Sonic Force, Shango	Arthur Baker, Leroi Evans, Ray Serrano, Afrika Bambaataa Aasim, William Henderson, Ellis Williams, John Miller, Robert Allen, Wilfred Fowler	Arthur Baker	5:04

B-side

#	^{Title}	^{Artist(s)}	^{Writer(s)}	^{Producer(s)}	^{Length}
B1	"Beat Street Strut"	Juicy	Milton G. Barnes, Katreese Barnes	Eumir Deodato	5:00
B2	"Us Girls"	Sharon Green, Lisa Counts & Debbie D	Debora Hooper, Lisa Counts, Ross Levinson, Sharon Green	Harry Belafonte	3:52
B3	"This Could Be the Night"	Cindy Mizelle	A. Baker, Carl Sturken, Evan Rogers, Chris Lord-Alge, Tina Baker	A. Baker	4:53
B4	"Breaker's Revenge"	Arthur Baker	A. Baker	A. Baker	4:42
B5	"Tu Cariño / Carmen's Theme"	Ruben Blades	Carlos Franzetti, Ruben Blades	H. Belafonte	3:06

=== Volume 2 (80158) ===
A-side

#	^{Title}	^{Artist(s)}	^{Writer(s)}	^{Producer(s)}	^{Length}
A1	"Son of Beat Street"	Jazzy Jay	John Byas, Lenny Underwood	David Belafonte	4:05
A2	"Give Me All"	Juicy	M. Barnes, K. Barnes	A. Baker, H. Belafonte	4:25
A3	"Nothin's Gonna Come Easy"	Tina B	A. Baker, T. Baker	A. Baker, H. Belafonte	4:19
A4	"Santa's Rap"	The Treacherous Three	Kevin Keaton, LaMar Hill, Mohandas Dewese	D. Belafonte	6:10

B-side

#	^{Title}	^{Artist(s)}	^{Writer(s)}	^{Producer(s)}	^{Length}
B1	"It's All Right By Me"	Jenny Burton	Peter Link	Peter Link, Webster Lewis	5:00
B2	"Battle Cry"	Rockers Revenge	A. Baker, Donald Calvin Hawkes, Vincent Dwight Fuller	A. Baker	4:52
B3	Phony Four MC's – "Wappin' (Bubblehead)"	Ralph Rolle	Earl Deas, Eric Real, Ralph Rolle	A. Baker, H. Belafonte	6:11
B4	"Into The Night"	La La	LaForest Cope, L. Underwood, Webster Lewis	Webster Lewis	4:42

== Credits and personnel ==
- Sanford Allen – concertmaster, violin
- Arthur Baker – bass, drums, producer
- Tina Baker – performer
- Katreese Barnes – performer
- Sharon Green – performer
- Milton Barnes – performer
- David Belafonte – sound effects
- Sandra Billingslea – violin
- Jay Burnett – guitar
- Kennan Keating- wah wah guitar
- Jenny Burton – vocals
- Jack Cavari – guitar
- John Clark – French horn
- Deodato – producer
- Lewis Eley – violin
- Jon Faddis – trumpet
- Eileen Folson – cello
- Winterton Garvey – violin
- Dwight Hawkes – backing vocalist
- Lamar Hill – performer
- Cecilia Hobbs – violin
- Stanley Hunte – violin
- Jean Ingraham – violin
- Anthony Jackson – bass
- Jazzy Jay – drum programming, scratching
- Bashiri Johnson – percussion
- Kevin Keaton – performer
- Robbie Kilgore – bells
- La La – sound effects, backing vocalist
- Jesse Levy – cello
- Webster Lewis - DX-7, Fender Rhodes, piano
- Peter Link – performer
- Chris "Lord-Alge" Simmons – drums
- Guy Lumia – violin
- John Pintavalle – violin
- Sue Pray – viola
- Maxine Roach – viola
- Ralph Rolle – drum programming, sound effects, vocals
- Alan Rubin – trumpet
- Lew Soloff – trumpet
- David Spinozza – guitar
- Marti Sweet – violin
- Tina B. – vocals
- Lenny Underwood – bass, drums, keyboards
- Buddy Williams – drums
- Richard D. Young – violin
- Fred Zarr – bass, keyboards

== Charts ==
=== Volume 1 ===
Chart (1984)	Position
Australia (Kent Music Report)	33
US Billboard R&B Albums	10
US Billboard 200	14

=== Volume 2 ===
Chart (1984)	Position
US Billboard R&B Albums	47
US Billboard 200	137

== Album certifications ==
Region	Certification	Certified units/sales
United States (RIAA)	Gold	500,000^{^}
^{^} Shipments figures based on certification alone.
