= The Treacherous Three (album) =

Studio album by Treacherous Three
- Released: 1984
- Recorded: 1980–1983
- Genre: Old-school hip hop
- Label: Sugar Hill
- Producer: Sylvia Robinson

Treacherous Three chronology
Whip It (1983)	The Treacherous Three (1984)	Old School Flava (1994)

Singles from The Treacherous Three
- 1. "The Body Rock" Released: 1980; 2. "At the Party" Released: 1980; 3. "Feel the Heartbeat" Released: 1981; 4. "Turning You On / U.F.O." Released: 1983; 5. "Get Up" Released: 1983

The Treacherous Three is the first studio album by American hip hop group Treacherous Three. It was released in 1984 via Sugar Hill Records with distribution of MCA Records and produced by Sylvia Robinson. Complex (magazine) puts the album at number 39 on their 50 Greatest Rap Albums of the 1980s.

The songs "At the Party", "Feel the Heartbeat" and "The Body Rock" were recorded and released from 1980 to 1981 as 12" singles for Bobby Robinson's Enjoy Records and were also compiled on Whip It (1983). The songs "Turning You On", "U.F.O." and "Get Up" were recorded and released in 1983 on Sylvia Robinson's Sugar Hill Records.

== Track listing ==
No.	Title	Length
1.	"Get Up"	6:05
2.	"Turning You On"	6:10
3.	"U.F.O."	6:50
4.	"The Body Rock"	7:27
5.	"Feel the Heartbeat"	5:22
6.	"At the Party"	7:22

Notes

- "Feel the Heartbeat" sampled "Heartbeat" by Taana Gardner
- "At the Party" sampled "Daisy Lady" by 7th Wonder

== Personnel ==
- Kevin Keaton – vocals
- Lamar A. Hill – vocals
- Mohandes Dewese – vocals
- Sylvia Robinson – producer
- Paul Austin – mastering
- Carl Rowatti – mastering
- Hemu Aggarwal – photography
