= The Best of Enjoy! Records =

Compilation album by Various artists
- Released: 1989
- Genre: Hip hop
- Label: Hot

The Best of Enjoy! Records is a 1989 compilation album of early hip hop music released by the Enjoy! Records music label. The album was part of a series of compilation albums from Hot Records covering various releases from American and British independent music labels. Retrospective reviews of the album from The Rough Guide to Hip-Hop and Spin and the Oakland Tribune as containing some of the best music of early hip hop.

== Content ==
Hot Productions released a nine-volume compilation album of "Best Of..." series in late 1989 that were double albums that trace back to the beginning of various New York music scenes, British independent dance music, and more. These ranged from compilations for "O" Records, Personal Records, as well as early hip hop music from the Enjoy! label. Oliver Wang of the Oakland Tribune discussed the music on the compilation, comparing it other contemporary hip hop tracks like the Sugar Hill Gang's "Rapper's Delight" and Kurtis Blow's "The Breaks" stating that the music was "far more clean and minimalistic -- often times little more than a rollicking breakbeat and well-placed bassline -- than much of the overproduced rap tunes of the era that aped disco production."

== Release and reception ==
Retrospective ratings
Review scores
Source	Rating
AllMusic	4/5 stars
Spin Alternative Record Guide	7/10

The Best of Enjoy! Records was released in late 1989. From contemporary reviews, the entire Best Of... series was included in Cashbox's "Picks O' the Week" for January 27, 1990.

From retrospective reviews, Carol Cooper wrote in the Spin Alternative Record Guide praised the album, stating it "preserves the special ambience of early hip hop, before all these acts were lured from Harmel-based Enjoy! to Jersey's seemingly better-capitalized Sugar Hill." Stephen Thomas Erlewine of AllMusic gave the album a four-star rating. In the book The Rough Guide to Hip-Hop, the album was listed as a recommended album and praised as containing "great grooves, courtesy of band led by drummer Pumpkin and percussionist Poochi Costello" and that roster of artists performing included "the best of the old school crews." concluding that Enjoy released some of the best early hip-hop period." Charles Aaron included the album in Spin included the compilation on his list of Essential Old-School Hip-Hop, stating that the album was a "set of lyrical concertos has never been touched for bombastic breath-control virtuosity. Wang included the album in his article on Overlooked hip hop albums in 2007, praising the rapping as being "far more dexterous and sophisticated than many assume of the old-school legends" which led to many of the artists on the label to be signed by Sugar Hill such as Grandmaster Flash and the Furious Five. Wang declared the highlights to be "Love Rap", "New Rap Language" and "Rockin' It".

== Track listing ==
1. Grandmaster Flash & The Furious Five – "Superappin'" (6:47)
2. Spoonie Gee & Treacherous Three – "Love Rap" (5:42)
3. Treacherous Three – "Body Rock" (7:25)
4. Treacherous Three – "At The Party" (7:25)
5. The Fearless Four – "It's Magic" (5:25)
6. Disco Four – "Move With the Groove" (7:25)
7. The Masterdon Committee – "Funk Box Party" (6:57)
8. Treacherous Three – "Feel the Heartbeat" (5:29)
9. Doug E. Fresh – "Just Having Fun" (5:25)
10. Treacherous Three & Spoonie Gee – "The New Rap Language" (8:07)
11. The Fearless Four – "Rockin' It"
