= Old School Flava =

Studio album by Treacherous Three
- Released: February 21, 1994
- Recorded: 1993–1994
- Genre: Hip hop
- Length: 47:09
- Label: Wrap
- Producer: DJ Easy Lee (exec.); Ken Fambro; Kool Moe Dee; Special K; LA Sunshine; Ced-Gee; Clark Kent; Joseph Carne; Rahiem; Jasz (co.); T La Rock (add.)

Treacherous Three chronology
The Treacherous Three (1984)	Old School Flava (1994)	Turn It Up (2000)

Professional ratings
Review scores
Source	Rating
AllMusic	2/5 stars
Robert Christgau	B+
Entertainment Weekly	B−

Old School Flava is the second studio album by American hip hop group the Treacherous Three. It was released in 1994 via Wrap Records and was produced by DJ Easy Lee, Ced Gee, Clark Kent, Joseph Carne, Ken Fambro, Kool Moe Dee, LA Sunshine, Rahiem, Special K, Jasz and T La Rock. It featured guest appearances from Big Daddy Kane, Chuck D, Doug E. Fresh, Grandmaster Caz, Heavy D, Melle Mel and Tito.

== Track listing ==
No.	Title	Writer(s)	Producer(s)	Length
1.	"Old School Flava"	K. Keaton; L. Hill; M. Dewese	Ken Fambro; The Treacherous Three	5:08
2.	"We Come Phat"	K. Keaton; L. Hill; M. Dewese	Joseph Carne	4:13
3.	"Lower the Boom"	K. Keaton; L. Hill; M. Dewese	Ken Fambro; The Treacherous Three	5:01
4.	"The Mic Wreckers"	K. Keaton; L. Hill; M. Dewese	Rahiem	4:34
5.	"Mo' Money Mo'"	M. Dewese	Ken Fambro; Kool Moe Dee	4:58
6.	"Ain't Nothin' Changed"	K. Keaton; L. Hill; M. Dewese	Ced-Gee	5:59
7.	"Sun Is Up"	K. Keaton	Special K; Jasz (co.); T La Rock (add.)	4:34
8.	"We Wit It" (featuring Big Daddy Kane, Chuck D, Heavy D, Melle Mel, Tito)	C. Ridenhour; K. Keaton; L. Hill; M. Glover; M. Dewese	Ken Fambro	4:20
9.	"A True Story"	L. Hill	Ken Fambro	3:41
10.	"Feel the New Heartbeat" (featuring Doug E. Fresh)	K. Keaton; L. Hill; M. Dewese	Clark Kent	4:41
Total length:				47:09

== Personnel ==
- Mohandas Dewese – main artist, producer, mixing (tracks: 1–2, 4–6)
- Kevin Keaton – main artist, producer, mixing (track 7)
- Lamar Hill – main artist, producer
- Theodore Moyé – executive producer, mixing (tracks: 3–4, 6, 8–10)
- Antonio Hardy – featured artist (track 8)
- Carlton Douglas Ridenhour – featured artist (track 8)
- Dwight Errington Myers – featured artist (track 8)
- Melvin Glover – featured artist (track 8)
- Wilfredo Dones – featured artist (track 8)
- Curtis Fisher – featured artist (track 8)
- Douglas E. Davis – featured artist (track 10)
- John Otto – guitar (track 1), artwork
- Jimmy O'Neill – bass (track 2), mixing (tracks: 1–2, 5, 7), recording
- Ken Fambro – producer (tracks: 1, 3, 5, 8–9)
- Rodolfo Antonio Franklin – producer & mixing (track 10)
- Cedric Ulmont Miller – producer (track 6)
- Guy Todd Williams – producer (track 4)
- Joseph Carne – producer (track 2)
- Clarence Ronnie Keaton – additional producer (track 7)
- Jasz – co-producer (track 7)
- Butch Williams – mixing (track 10)
- Bruce Powell Bennett – recording
- Joseph Saddler – recording
- Tony Smalios – recording
- John Briglevich – recording
- Mark Allen – assistant engineer
- Steve Briglevich – assistant engineer
- Scott Eraas – assistant engineer
- Tamara Rafkin – photography
