= Kel Spencer =

- Born: Lennie De Juan Bennett; 1978; Landstuhl, Germany
- Genre: Hip hop
- Occupations: Rapper, songwriter, producer, actor, film director
- Years active: 1999–present
- Labels: Overbrook Entertainment (former); Interscope Records (former); 3rd Power Music Group (current)

Lennie De Juan Bennett (born 1978), professionally known as Kel Spencei and also as K. Sensel, is an American songwriter, recording artist, record producer, actor, film director and entrepreneur from Brooklyn, New York City. He is best known for co-writing more than 20 songs for Will Smith including the American Music Award-winning single "Switch", "Will 2K" and "Black Suits Comin' (Nod Ya Head) and has been associated with Grammy, Soul Train and MTV Video Music awards nominations.

His career has included contributions to albums, film and television soundtracks, advertising campaigns, and live entertainment. Beyond music, he founded the youth program Pens of Power, the creative and marketing company Keleidoscope Multimedia, and the events company Playtime Worldwide, and works in sports and entertainment representation through The Legacy Brand.

== Early life and education ==
Spencer was born in 1978 in Landstuhl, West Germany where his father, serving in the Air Force was stationed. He was raised in Brooklyn, New York City, and attended Canarsie High School, where he played quarterback and earned PSAL New York All-City honors. At 16, Spencer enrolled at Morgan State University in Baltimore, studying business at the Earl G. Graves School of Business and Management. He later returned to the university and completed his undergraduate degree in 2014.

== Music career ==
After showcasing in various hip-hop talent shows starting in 1992, Spencer was discovered by Hollywood icon Will Smith and signed in 2000 to Overbrook Entertainment/Interscope Records. He first appeared in 1999 on two songs from the Wild Wild West soundtrack, peaking at number four on the US Billboard 200 and number one on the Top R&B/Hip-Hop Albums. The same year he co-wrote 7 out of the 15 tracks off of Will Smith multi-platinum album Willennium. Spencer co-wrote the Grammy and Soul Train awards nominated "Will 2K" as well as hit single "Freakin' It" and appeared as a guest artist on the song "Uuhhh".

He later went on to collaborates with the likes of MC Lyte, Lil J, Teddy Riley, Wyclef Jean, Nick Cannon, Lil' Kim, Carl Thomas, Heavy D, Rodney "Darkchild" Jerkins, Miri Ben-Ari, Mary J. Blige and co-wrote the singles "Freak Freak" by Grammy Award winners The Product G&B (2001) and "It Ain't My Fault" by So Plush (2002). Spencer teamed up again on Will Smith's 2003 album "Born to Reign" co-writing 7 tracks out of 14 including the leading single and MTV Video Music Award nominated "Black Suits Comin' (Nod Ya Head)". Spencer renewed his collaboration with Smith on 5 tracks out of Smith's platinum 2005 album "Lost and Found", including the lead single "Switch" which reached number seven on the Billboard Hot 100 and won an American Music Award.

Spencer gained further recognition contributing to albums from DJ Jazzy Jeff and Grandmaster Flash. As a recording artist, his music has been featured in "American Pie: The Naked Mile" and the television series HawthoRNe, starring Jada Pinkett Smith. He was named a BET Music Matters artist and has written music for television, advertisements, and brand campaigns, including work associated with Burger King, Pepsi, and NFL teams..

Spencer founded the independent label 3rd Power Music Group, and released the critically acclaimed mixtape "Who is Kel Spencer" in 2005, the EP "Streets know that" in 2006, a second mixtape "Brooklyn Spartans" in 2007 and a relationship based novelty album called "Salon Stories" in 2009. "Salon Stories", hosted by MC Lyte explored relationships throuhj music, poetry and spoken words and featured Q-tip, Def Poets, Rivaflowz, Shanelle Gabriel and Jesse Boykins III

In 2020 Bennett reported writing the lyrics for a Kobe Bryant tribute performed by Snoop Dogg during ESPN’s ESPY Awards broadcast.

== Film, television, and media ==
Having started an acting career in the 2010s, Spencer has garnered roles and writing/directing credits in several independent films, Web series, theatre productions, and has contributed to various voice-over projects. He produced and directed "Date 'N Game: The Movie" in 2015, co-written with Quana BelleVoix and Lisa Harris.. He served as songwriter and music supervisor for "Sins of the Father" (2025). His film "The Big Phish: and its soundtrack are in development.

He co-authored "Single Man, Married Man" and has written culture commentary for BET and Centric (now BET Her).

== Business, sports and community work ==
Bennett founded Keleidoscope Multimedia, a creative media, branding, and marketing company offering video production, brand development, content creation, event production, and educational media.. He has also created Pens of Power, a youth program focused on writing, communication, cultural awareness, and mentorship, with school workshops, mentoring, student media production, and leadership development. It grew out of Bennett’s school appearances and panels and has a nonprofit foundation arm.

Bennett is a founder of Playtime Worldwide, an entertainment and social-experience company organising fun activities for building/bettering relationships in culture. Its community arm PT Village organizes charitable drives and events in New York City. Bennett serves as a sports and entertainment agent and head of marketing at The Legacy Brand, a boutique sports and entertainment management company founded by his brother, Lance Bennett, a former Indiana University All-American return specialist who is now a defensive quality control coach for the Minnesota Vikings. The company focuses on NIL representation, primarily for college football players, along with partnerships and brand marketing.

== Personal life ==
Bennett is married to Quana BelleVoix, an entertainer and creative collaborator. They have three children and produce the online series "Thee Bennett Show", a family-media platform covering marriage, parenting, entrepreneurship, and lifestyle.
