= Turn It Up (Treacherous Three album) =

Compilation album by Treacherous Three
- Released: July 11, 2000
- Recorded: 1980–2000
- Genre: Hip hop
- Label: Sequel
- Producer: DJ Easy Lee; Kool Moe Dee; Special K; LA Sunshine

Treacherous Three chronology
Old School Flava (1994)	Turn It Up (2000)

Professional ratings
Review scores
Source	Rating
Allmusic	link

Turn It Up is a compilation album of rare and unreleased material by The Treacherous Three and Kool Moe Dee. It was released on July 11, 2000, for Sequel Records and was produced by the members, DJ Easy Lee, Kool Moe Dee, Special K and LA Sunshine. Samples from "The Body Rock" were used by Mariah Carey for her song "Honey" on her album Butterfly, and by Akon for his song "Belly Dancer (Bananza)".

== Track listing ==
1. "Whip It" – 7:44
2. "Yes We Can Can" – 6:58
3. "Action" – 5:48
4. "The Body Rock" – 7:30
5. "Feel the Heartbeat" – 5:36
6. "At the Party" – 7:31
7. "Get Up" – 6:05
8. "X-Mas Rap" (X-Rated Version)- 6:09 (Featuring Doug E. Fresh)
9. "Gotta Rock" – 5:02
10. "Turn It Up" – 7:34
11. "Bad Mutha" – 4:16
12. "Dumb Dick" – 5:03
