= San Isidoro y San Leandro Western Orthodox Catholic Church of the Hispanic Mozarabic Rite =

Church in Manhattan, New York

The San Isidoro y San Leandro Western Orthodox Catholic Church of the Hispanic Mozarabic Rite
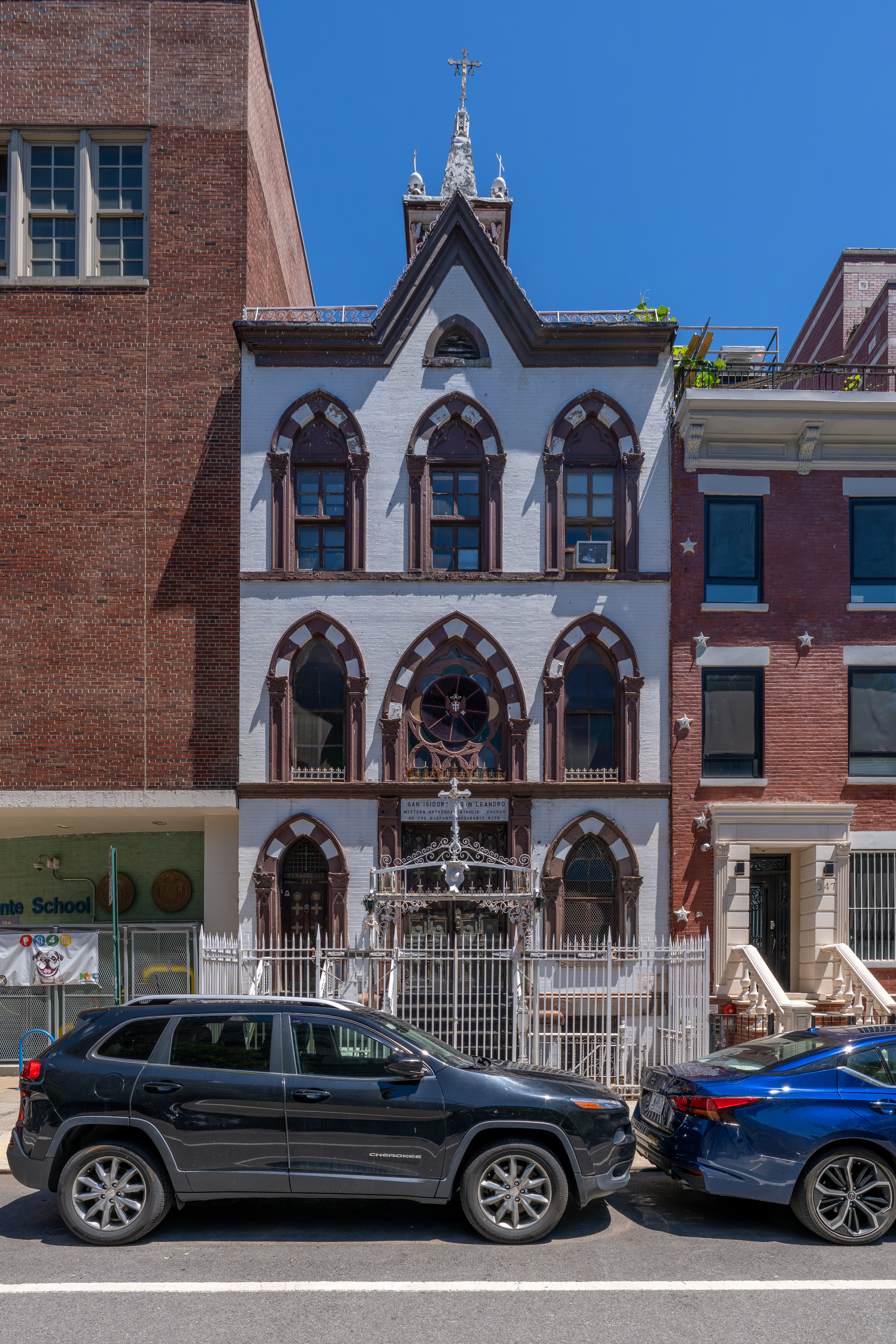
- The San Isidoro y San Leandro Western Orthodox Catholic Church of the Hispanic Mozarabic Rite
- 40.7217°N 73.9784°W
- Location: 345 East 4th Street, New York, New York
- Denomination: Roman Catholic
- Tradition: Hispanic Mozarabic Rite

History
- Consecrated: 1892

Architecture
- Architect: Edward Wenz
- Style: Gothic Revival; Moorish; Ruskinian Gothic
- Completed: 1892

The San Isidoro y San Leandro Western Orthodox Catholic Church of the Hispanic Mozarabic Rite is a church in the Alphabet City area of the East Village neighborhood of Manhattan, New York City. It was consecrated in 1892.

== History ==
The structure began as a tenement house, acquired by the Catholic Church of St. Elizabeth of Hungary in 1891 for $7,500 (equivalent to $269,000 in 2025). The new building was built by architect Edward Wenz for a fee of 16,200 (equivalent to $580,000 in 2025), and consecrated in 1892.

Over time, the neighborhood became more Russian and Ukrainian, and the German, Polish, and Hungarian population moved uptown. The congregation purchased and relocated to the St. Elizabeth of Hungary Church on the Upper East Side in 1917, and the building was sold to the Russian Greek Orthodox Church of the Holy Trinity sometime before 1930.

The building was sold again in 1975, to become the San Isidoro y San Leandro Western Orthodox Catholic Church of the Hispanic Mozarabic Rite.

== In popular culture ==
The church appears on the cover of rapper Kool Moe Dee's 1987 album How Ya Like Me Now.
