= Willennium =

Studio album by Will Smith
- Released: November 16, 1999
- Recorded: 1998–1999
- Studio: A Touch of Jazz, The Studio (Philadelphia, Pennsylvania); The Hacienda, The Mix Room (Los Angeles); The Hit Factory, Right Track, Quad, Maw (New York City)
- Genre: Hip-hop; pop rap
- Length: 61:43
- Label: Columbia
- Producer: Jeff Townes; Poke & Tone; Darren "Limitless" Henson; Rob Fusari; Keith Pelzer; Falonte Moore; KayGee; Darren Lighty; Carvin Haggins; "Little" Louie Vega; Kenny "Dope" Gonzalez; Rodney "Darkchild" Jerkins; Harvey Mason, Jr.; Sauce; Andre Harris; Eric Roberson; Mark Wilson

Will Smith chronology
| Big Willie Style (1997) | Willennium (1999) | Born to Reign (2002) |

Singles from Willennium
- 1. "Wild Wild West" Released: May 11, 1999; 2. "Will 2K" Released: November 8, 1999; 3. "Freakin' It" Released: March 22, 2000

Willennium is the second studio album by American actor and rapper Will Smith. Recorded with a range of producers, including Poke & Tone and frequent collaborator DJ Jazzy Jeff, it was released on November 16, 1999, by Columbia Records. The album reached number 5 on the US Billboard 200 and was certified multi-platinum by the RIAA, making this Smith's second top ten album and second multi-platinum album following Big Willie Style in 1997. The album also reached the top ten on the UK Albums Chart, and was certified multi-platinum in that region and in other regions. "Wild Wild West", "Will 2K" and "Freakin' It" were released as singles.

== Recording and production ==
Much of the recording for Willennium took place at producer DJ Jazzy Jeff's A Touch of Jazz Studios in their hometown of Philadelphia, Pennsylvania, where nine songs were tracked. Additional recording took place in Los Angeles, California at The Hacienda and The Mix Room, and in New York City, New York at The Hit Factory, Right Track Studios, Quad Studios.

Production for Willennium was handled by a number of producers who had previously worked on Big Willie Style, including executive producers DJ Jazzy Jeff and Poke & Tone, Keith Pelzer and Sauce, as well as a number of new contributors: Rob Fusari, Kay-Gee, "Little" Louie Vega, Rodney "Darkchild" Jerkins and more.

The tenth track, "Can You Feel Me?", samples the song, "Working Day and Night", from Michael Jackson's Off the Wall studio album.

== Promotion and release ==
The release of Willennium was preceded by the single "Wild Wild West" in May 1999, originally released on Wild Wild West: Music Inspired by the Motion Picture. The title track to the film of the same name was a commercial success, reaching the top ten on singles charts around the world, and topping the US Billboard Hot 100 as Smith's second US number one. "Will 2K" was released as the album's second single in November, and reached the top three in Australia and the United Kingdom. The third and final single from Willennium, "Freakin' It", reached number 15 on the UK Singles Chart.

== Composition ==
=== Lyrics ===
On Willennium, Smith is said to celebrate his success on a number of songs, including album opener "I'm Comin'" and single "Freakin' It", in which he responds to criticism directed at lead single "Wild Wild West" by pointing out its performance on the singles charts. Nathan Rabin of The A.V. Club goes as far as to claim that on the album Smith "takes the offensive, lashing out against critics who've labeled him a soft sell-out", and points out that some of the lyrics level criticism against the gangsta rap genre.

A review by the magazine NME categorised songs on the album into two categories: first, "partied-up, pumped-up, knock-out rap records", and second, "schmaltzy songs about brotherly love and stuff". Cynthia Fuchs of the website PopMatters claims that Willennium is "an album about the future, specifically, Smith’s future cred on the hip-hop front", and points out the presence of lyrical themes such as money, politics, and relationships. The Harvard Crimson's Carla Mastraccio notes the "clever satire of pop culture" in "Freakin' It", and the overall relatability of the simple lyrics on the album, while Steve Jones of USA Today identifies themes of family and loyalty in the lyrics.

=== Music ===
Writing for the website AllMusic, Stephen Thomas Erlewine described Willennium positively as "gaudy, giddy, infectiously silly, and proudly over-the-top", praising the album for featuring "bright, joyful party music that celebrates its big beats and big hooks". Erlewine noted the use of samples from "Rock the Casbah" by English punk rock band The Clash in the single "Will 2K" as "so mind-bogglingly unpredictable that it's hard not to smile". In addition to upbeat songs, the album has also been described as featuring ballads (including "No More") and Latin pop sounds (on "La Fiesta"). Nathan Rabin of The A.V. Club describes the album negatively as composed of "slick, soulless party jams, old-school nostalgia, chemistry-free duets ... and cheerful materialism".

== Critical reception ==
Professional ratings
Review scores
| Source | Rating |
|---|---|
| AllMusic | 4/5 stars |
| Christgau's Consumer Guide | (neither) |
| Entertainment Weekly | B+ |
| The Harvard Crimson | A |
| Hot Press | 4/12 |
| NME | 8/10 |
| USA Today | 3/4 stars |

Media response to Willennium was generally positive. Stephen Thomas Erlewine of AllMusic awarded the album four out of five stars, writing an extremely favorable review which praised the "joyful party music", lyrical and musical themes, and performances of the featured artists. Erlewine noted that "Smith isn't quite as convincing when it comes to slow [songs]", but claimed that "the heart of the album lies in the up-tempo dance numbers, since they're what make Willennium irresistible". A review published by NME was similarly positive, claiming that Willennium is evidence of Smith's dominance of the hip-hop genre at the time, and praising songs such as "I'm Comin'", "Freakin' It" and "Da Butta". Carla Mastraccio of The Harvard Crimson praised the album's lyrics and labelled Willennium as an "energetic and artistically diverse album". Steve Jones of USA Today awarded the album three out of four stars, praising its lyrics and featured artists.

Writing for the website PopMatters, however, Cynthia Fuchs describes Willennium as "generic", commenting unfavorably on various lyrics, themes and performances. Nathan Rabin of The A.V. Club was similarly damning, claiming that Willennium is "more notable for its commercial calculation than its artistic worth", criticising many of the album's lyrical themes and dubbing it "commercially overachieving" and "generic". Hot Press writer Stephen Robinson gave the album an unfavorable rating of four out of twelve.

People provided a mixed review of Willennium; the reviewers praised the collaboration with DJ Jazzy Jeff on "Pump Me Up", and noted that Smith "sounds energized and once again in love with hip hop" on the track "So Fresh". However, they described the single "Will 2K" as "utterly awful" and "gimmicky", and claim that Smith "is overwhelmed by the cluttered production" on the record. Entertainment Weekly are similarly hesitant, complaining about elements including the samples and some lyrics, but ultimately praising Willennium as proof that Smith is "a lyrically fluid rapper with deep roots in hip-hop culture and a clearly defined artistic vision".

== Commercial performance ==
Willennium was a commercial success, the album debuted at number five on the US Billboard 200 chart, selling 187,000 copies in its first week. The album remained on the chart for a total of 26 weeks. In December 1999, the album had been certified double platinum by the Recording Industry Association of America (RIAA) for sales of over two million copies. By February 2000, the album had sold a total of 4.3 million copies worldwide.

In the United Kingdom, the album debuted at number 11 on November 27 on the UK Albums Chart, before peaking at number ten the following week and remained on the chart for 11 weeks; it later returned to the chart in March 2000 for another six-week run. The album was certified platinum by the British Phonographic Industry, indicating sales in the UK of over 300,000 units, In other regions in which the album peaked in the top 20 include France at number 20, Germany at number 20, and Switzerland at number 16.

The album was also certified gold by the Australian Recording Industry Association, indicating Australian sales of over 35,000 units, and double platinum by Music Canada, indicating Canadian sales of over 200,000 units.

== Accolades and awards ==
Willennium earned Smith recognition at a number of music industry awards ceremonies. At the 1999 MTV Video Music Awards, the music video for "Wild Wild West" received nominations for the Video of the Year, Best Video from a Film and Best Choreography awards. Smith won the award for Favorite Pop/Rock Male Artist at the 27th American Music Awards in January 2000, which he had lost the previous year to Eric Clapton, and he also received a nomination for Best International Male at the 2000 Brit Awards held in March.

After winning the award twice in a row in 1998 and 1999, Smith was nominated again for the Grammy Award for Best Rap Solo Performance at the 2000 ceremony for "Wild Wild West", but lost out to Eminem's debut single "My Name Is". At the 2001 Grammy Awards, "Will 2K" received a nomination for the Best Music Video, Short Form award, but lost out to the video for "Learn to Fly" by Foo Fighters. At the 2000 Kids' Choice Awards, Smith received the awards for Favorite Male Singer, Favorite Song and Favorite Song from a Movie (both for "Wild Wild West").

== Track listing ==
| No. | Title | Writer(s) | Producer(s) | Length |
|---|---|---|---|---|
| 1. | "I'm Comin'" (featuring Tra-Knox) | Will Smith; Rob Fusari; Falonte Moore; Lennie Bennett; Rochelle Runnells; Peter Brown; Robert Rans | Fusari; Moore; Eric Roberson^{[a]} | 3:55 |
| 2. | "Will 2K" (featuring K-Ci) | Smith; Cedric Hailey; Darren Henson; Bennett; Joe Strummer; Mick Jones; Topper Headon; Bobby Robinson | Poke & Tone | 3:54 |
| 3. | "Freakin' It" | Smith; Bennett; Jean-Claude Olivier; Samuel Barnes; Pam Sawyer; Marilyn McLeod; Bernard Edwards; Nile Rodgers | Poke & Tone | 3:59 |
| 4. | "Da Butta" (featuring Lil' Kim) | Smith; Kimberly Jones; Bennett; Zane Grey; Len Ron Hanks | KayGee; Darren Lighty | 2:59 |
| 5. | "La Fiesta" | Smith; Carvin Haggins; Keith Pelzer; Henson; Ivan Bavarias; Lonnie Lynn; Tito Puente | Jeff Townes; Pelzer; Haggins; Masters at Work | 4:16 |
| 6. | "Who Am I" (featuring Tatyana Ali and MC Lyte) | Smith; Rodney Jerkins; LaShawn Daniels; Harvey Mason, Jr.; Fred Jerkins III; Lana Moorer; Tatyana Ali | Jerkins; Mason, Jr. | 4:03 |
| 7. | "Afro Angel" | Smith; Jada Pinkett Smith; Bennett; Channette Higgins; Channoah Higgins; Bob Dorough | Sauce | 5:10 |
| 8. | "So Fresh" (featuring Biz Markie and Slick Rick) | Smith; Jeff Townes; Henson; Laurindo Almeida; Rokusuke Ei; Hachidai Nakamura; James Cason; Marcel Hall; Antonio Hardy; Marlon Williams; Lawrence Goodman | Townes; Henson | 4:15 |
| 9. | "Pump Me Up" (performed by DJ Jazzy Jeff & The Fresh Prince) | Smith; Townes; Richard Walters; Douglas Davis; Eric Barrier; William Griffin; Lawrence Parker; Hardy; Williams; Robert Reed; Tony Fisher; Taylor Reed; Emmett Nixon; Vincent Davis; Joe Roper, Jr. | Townes | 4:06 |
| 10. | "Can You Feel Me?" (featuring Eve) | Smith; Eve Jeffers; Henson; Lia Grant; Michael Jackson | Townes; Pelzer | 3:44 |
| 11. | "Potnas/Interlude" | "Potnas": Smith; Bennett; Larry Smith; Jalil Hutchins; "Interlude": Smith; Townes; Andre Harris; Henson; Haggins; Lynn; Leon Bryant | "Potnas": DJ Jazzy Jeff & The Fresh Prince; "Interlude": Townes; Harris | 6:09 |
| 12. | "No More" (featuring Breeze) | Smith; Neil Larsen | Townes; Henson | 3:25 |
| 13. | "Uuhhh" (featuring Kel Spencer) | Smith; Bennett; Townes; Henson; Lynn; Duval Clear; Dale Hawkins; Stanley Lewis | Townes; Henson | 3:29 |
| 14. | "Wild Wild West" (featuring Dru Hill and Kool Moe Dee) | Smith; Fusari; Mohandas Dewese; Stevie Wonder | Fusari; Mark Wilson^{[b]} | 4:29 |
| 15. | "The Rain" (featuring Jill Scott) | Smith; Lynn; Jill Scott; Townes; Henson; Deniece Williams; William Neale | Townes; Henson | 4:48 |

Notes

- ^{^a} signifies a vocal producer
- ^{^b} signifies an additional producer
- "Will 2K" features vocals by Tye-V Turman and The Love Fellowship Tabernacle Children's Choir.
- "Freakin' It" features vocals by Mai Huggins, Bugsy and The Love Fellowship Tabernacle Children's Choir.
- "La Fiesta" features vocals by Claudette Sierra, Charles Alston, Jeff Townes, Omarr Rambert, Tanya Pendleton, Amber Noble and Nandi Dalen.
- "Afro Angel" features vocals by Anthem and spoken word by Jada Pinkett Smith.
- "Can You Feel Me?" features vocals by Lia Grant.
- "No More" features vocals by Lia Grant, Sydney Lim and Sandy Plute.
- "The Rain" features vocals by J. Bailey, S. Bailey, K. Mitchell, A. Dunlap and C. Townes.

Sample credits

- "I'm Comin'" contains a sample of "Runnin' from the Law", written by Rochelle Runnells and performed by Stargard; and embodies portions of "Do You Wanna Get Funky with Me", written by Peter Brown and Robert Rans.
- "Will 2K" contains a sample of "Rock the Cashbah", written by Joe Strummer, Mick Jones, and Topper Headon, and performed by The Clash; and an interpolation of "Supper Rappin' 2", written by Bobby Robinson.
- "Freakin' It" embodies portions of "Love Hangover", written by Pam Sawyer and Marilyn McLeod, and performed by Diana Ross; and portions of "Rapper's Delight", written by Bernard Edwards and Nile Rodgers.
- "Da Butta" contains a sample of "(Every Time I Turn Around) Back in Love Again", written by Zane Grey and Len Ron Hanks, and performed by L.T.D.
- "La Fiesta" contains an interpolation sample of "Mambo con Puente", written by Tito Puente.
- "Afro Angel" contains a sample of "Figure Eight", written by Bob Dorough and performed by Blossom Dearie.
- "So Fresh" contains a sample of "Atabaque", written by Laurindo Almeida and performed by Laurindo Almeida featuring Bud Shank; an interpolation of "Sukiyaki", written by Rokusuke Ei, Hachidai Nakamura and James Cason; an interpolation of "Vapors", written by Marcel Hall, Antonio Hardy and Marlon Williams; and a sample of "The Def Fresh Crew", written by Lawrence Goodman and Marcel Hall, and performed by The Def Fresh Crew.
- "Pump Me Up" contains a sample of "La Di Da Di", written by Richard Walters and Douglas Davis, and performed by MC Ricky D; a sample of "The R", written by Eric Barrier and William Griffin, and performed by Eric B. & Rakim; a sample of "Hip-Hop vs. Rap", written and performed by KRS-One; a sample of "Just Rhymin' with Biz", written by Antonio Hardy and Marlon Williams, and performed by Big Daddy Kane; a sample of "Nuthin'", written and performed by Doug E. Fresh; a sample of "Pump Me Up", written by Robert Reed, Tony Fisher, Taylor Reed and Emmett Nixon, and performed by Trouble Funk; and a sample of "Pee Wee's Dance", written by Vincent Davis and Joe Roper, Jr., and performed by Joe Ski Love.
- "Can You Feel Me?" contains a sample of "Working Day and Night", written and performed by Michael Jackson.
- "Potnas" contains a portion of "Friends", written by Larry Smith and Jalil Hutchins.
- "Interlude" contains a sample of "Be What You Are", written by Leon Bryant and performed by Denie Corbett and Station Break.
- "No More" contains samples of "Casino Lights", written by Neil Larsen and performed by Neil Larsen and Buzz Feiten.
- "Uuhhh" contains a sample of "Susie Q", written by Dale Hawkins and Stanley Lewis, and performed by José Feliciano.
- "Wild Wild West" contains a portion of "I Wish", written and performed by Stevie Wonder; and a portion of "Wild Wild West", written and performed by Kool Moe Dee.
- "The Rain" contains a sample of "I Believe in Miracles", written by Deniece Williams and William Neale, and performed by Deniece Williams.

== Personnel ==
Personnel credits adapted from liner notes.

- Rob Chiarelli – engineering (tracks 4, 6, 7, 11, 12 and 14), mixing (tracks 1, 8, 10, 11 and 14)
- Jeff Townes – engineering (tracks 8, 9, 11, 12 and 15), scratches (tracks 2 and 14)
- Rich Travali – mixing (tracks 2, 3, 9 and 12), engineering (tracks 11 – "Potnas" only" – and 13)
- Kevin Crouse – engineering (tracks 2 and 3), drums (track 3)
- Keith Pelzer – engineering (tracks 5 and 10)
- Commissioner Gordon – mixing (tracks 13 and 15), engineering (track 13)
- Earl Cohen – engineering (track 1)
- Steve Baughman – mixing assistance (track 1)
- Poke & Tone – keyboards and programming (track 2)
- Michael Goods – keyboards and engineering (track 2)
- Adam Kudzin – engineering and mixing (track 4)
- Kay-Gee – mixing (track 4)
- Carlos Henriquez – Ampeg Baby Bass (track 5)
- Isidro Infante – piano (track 5)
- Carl E. Fischer – trumpet (track 5)
- John H. Wheeler – trombone (track 5)
- John M. Scarpulla – tenor saxophone (track 5)
- Lusito Quintero – percussion (track 5)
- Steven Barkan – engineering and mixing (track 5)
- Larry Phillabaum – engineering assistance (track 6)
- Harvey Mason, Jr. – Pro Tools editing (track 6)
- Brad Gilderman – mixing (track 6)
- Rodney Jerkins – mixing (track 6)
- Sauce – keyboard and drum programming (track 7)
- Les Butler – keyboard programming (track 7)
- Ro – drum programming (track 7)
- Kevin Davis – mixing (track 7)
- Will Smith – engineering (track 11 – "Potnas" only)
- John Smeltz – engineering (track 11 – "Potnas" only)
- Jim Bottari – engineering assistance (track 11 – "Potnas" only)
- Andre Harris – keyboards (track 12)
- Arty Syke – engineering (track 14)
- Darren Henson – engineering (track 15)

== Charts ==
=== Weekly charts ===
| Chart (1999) | Peak position |
|---|---|
| Australian Albums (ARIA) | 27 |
| Austrian Albums (Ö3 Austria) | 28 |
| Belgian Albums (Ultratop Flanders) | 14 |
| Belgian Albums (Ultratop Wallonia) | 13 |
| Canadian Albums (Billboard) | 6 |
| Dutch Albums (Album Top 100) | 26 |
| French Albums (SNEP) | 20 |
| German Albums (Offizielle Top 100) | 20 |
| Irish Albums (IRMA) | 26 |
| Japanese Albums (Oricon) | 14 |
| New Zealand Albums (RMNZ) | 28 |
| Norwegian Albums (VG-lista) | 24 |
| Scottish Albums (OCC) | 21 |
| Swedish Albums (Sverigetopplistan) | 35 |
| Swiss Albums (Schweizer Hitparade) | 16 |
| UK Albums (OCC) | 10 |
| UK R&B Albums (OCC) | 2 |
| US Billboard 200 | 5 |
| US Top R&B/Hip-Hop Albums (Billboard) | 8 |

=== Year-end charts ===
| Chart (1999) | Position |
|---|---|
| Belgian Albums (Ultratop Wallonia) | 99 |
| UK Albums (OCC) | 41 |

| Chart (2000) | Position |
|---|---|
| US Billboard 200 | 37 |
| US Top R&B/Hip-Hop Albums (Billboard) | 68 |

== Certifications ==
Certifications for Willennium
| Region | Certification | Certified units/sales |
|---|---|---|
| Australia (ARIA) | Gold | 35,000^{^} |
| Belgium (BRMA) | Gold | 25,000^{*} |
| Canada (Music Canada) | 2× Platinum | 200,000^{^} |
| France (SNEP) | Gold | 100,000^{*} |
| Japan (RIAJ) | Gold | 100,000^{^} |
| Switzerland (IFPI Switzerland) | Gold | 25,000^{^} |
| United Kingdom (BPI) | Platinum | 300,000^{^} |
| United States (RIAA) | 2× Platinum | 2,000,000^{^} |
Summaries
| Europe (IFPI) | Platinum | 1,000,000^{*} |
^{*} Sales figures based on certification alone.^{^} Shipments figures based on certification alone.
