= LA Sunshine =

American rapper

Lamar Hill, also known as LA Sunshine, is an American old-school hip hop rapper, and member of the Treacherous Three.

== MC career ==
In the late 1970s, he met Kool Moe Dee, DJ Easy Lee and Spoonie Gee started performing at the age of 15. Building on their chemistry, the three rappers and deejay decided to form the influential old school hip hop group the Treacherous Three. Shortly before the group could begin to achieve any stardom, Spoonie Gee decided to solo and was replaced by Special K. Despite going solo, Gee maintained close ties to the group, and was involved in the members getting their first record deal with his uncle's record label.

In 1981, they moved to Sugar Hill Records along with another Enjoy Records act Grandmaster Flash and the Furious Five. The Treacherous Three became well known for their singles "Feel the Heart Beat" and "Whip It". They were featured in the 1984 film the breakdance cult-movie Beat Street performing the song Xmas Rap with Doug E Fresh, but disbanded shortly afterwards. When Kool Moe Dee went solo, Hill went with him and performed on stages around the world but spent most of his time on tour doing drugs.

== Post-artistic career ==
In 2011, Hill penned an autobiography titled "L.A. Sunshine: A True Story, The Real Accounts" which details his difficult childhood, the perks and downsides of his time as an entertainer, and the depression, homelessness and suicide attempts that filled his early adult life.

Hill has worked several part-time and seasonal jobs in after-school programs and as a teacher's aide at several New York area educational facilities including Promise Academy Charter School in Harlem, Imagine Me Leadership Charter School in Brooklyn and the now closed Rice High School.

He still occasionally performs with the Treacherous Three and is proud of his early influence on the hip hop genre, but prefers the stability of a regular job.
