= Juicy (band) =

American music duo

- Genres: R&B, dance
- Years active: 1982–1987
- Labels: CBS Associated Records; Arista Records
- Past members: Jerry Barnes; Katreese Barnes

Juicy was an American musical duo consisting of siblings Jerry Barnes (of the band CHIC) and Katreese Barnes. The group is best known for the songs "Sugar Free" and Beat Street feature song "Beat Street Strut".

== Career ==
Their debut single "Don't Cha Wanna" was released in 1982 by Arista Records. In the same year they also released their first eponymous album, which made it into Billboard R&B chart the next year.

In 1984, their song "Beat Street Strut", released by the same label, appeared in the 1984 musical-drama movie Beat Street and its gold-certified soundtrack. The song peaked at #46 on Billboard Dance chart in July 1984.

Their second album It Takes Two was released in 1985. The album featured an answer record to the Mtume song "Juicy Fruit" called "Sugar Free". It peaked at #13 on the Billboard R&B chart and #45 on the UK Singles Chart. Another moderately successful single from the album included "Nobody but You", reaching number 59 on the R&B chart. “Sugar Free" has since been sampled by AZ for his song "Sugar Hill" among other artists.

Their last album, Spread the Love, released in 1987, was commercially unsuccessful, resulting in Juicy's disbanding. Katreese Barnes later became a producer, songwriter and the musical director for Saturday Night Live. She won the Primetime Emmy Award for Outstanding Original Music and Lyrics twice for composing music for SNL, first in 2007 as co-writer of The Lonely Island's "Dick in a Box" and again in 2011 for writing a monologue for Justin Timberlake. Katreese Barnes died of breast cancer on August 3, 2019, at the age of 56.

== Discography ==
=== Studio albums ===
Year	Album	Peaks	Record Label
Year	Album	US R&B	Record Label
1982	Juicy	57	Arista
1985	It Takes Two	32	Private I
1987	Spread the Love	—	CBS Associated
"—" denotes a recording that did not chart.

=== Singles ===
Year	Single	Peak chart positions				Album
Year	Single	US	US R&B	US Dan	UK	Album
1982	"I've Got Something"	—	—	—	—	Juicy
1982	"Don't Cha Wanna"	—	—	—	—	Juicy
1983	"Love's a Merry-Go-'Round"	—	75	—	—	Juicy
1983	"You're Number One"	—	—	—	—	Juicy
1984	"Beat Street Strut"	107	76	27	—	Beat Street
1985	"Bad Boy"	—	41	—	—	It Takes Two
1985	"It Takes Two"	—	72	—	—	It Takes Two
1986	"Sugar Free"	—	13	—	45	It Takes Two
1986	"Nobody but You"	—	59	—	—	It Takes Two
1987	"After Loving You"	—	—	—	84	Spread the Love
1987	"All Work, No Play"	—	—	—	—	Spread the Love
"—" denotes a recording that did not chart.
