= Interlude (Kool Moe Dee album) =

Studio album by Kool Moe Dee
- Released: November 8, 1994
- Genre: Hip hop
- Length: 53:40
- Label: Wrap; Ichiban
- Producer: Kool Moe Dee; DLB; Master O.C.; Scratch God

Kool Moe Dee chronology
Funke, Funke Wisdom (1991)	Interlude (1994)	The Jive Collection, Vol. 2 (1995)

Professional ratings
Review scores
Source	Rating
AllMusic	2.5/5 stars
(The New) Rolling Stone Album Guide	2.5/5 stars
Spin Alternative Record Guide	7/10

Interlude is the fifth studio album by the American hip hop artist Kool Moe Dee. It was released in 1994 via his Treacherous Three bandmate DJ Easy Lee's Wrap Records, with distribution by Ichiban Records. Alongside Kool Moe Dee, audio production was handled by Scratch God and the Fearless Four members DLB & Master O.C.

The album failed to regain Kool Moe Dee much of the success and popularity he had in the mid-1980s. It is his last studio album to date.

== Critical reception ==
The Daily Press wrote that the beats, "while competent by the standards of a few years ago, sound flat compared to the innovations of Dr. Dre." The Spin Alternative Record Guide thought that "Kool Moe Dee and his crew stand firm in their classicism." This Reached 64 on the R&B Charts

== Track listing ==
No.	Title	Producer(s)	Length
1.	"Interlude"		2:03
2.	"Oh Yea"	Scratch God; DLB; Master O.C.	4:28
3.	"Deez Nutz"	Scratch God; DLB; Master O.C.	4:41
4.	"Catch the Moe" (featuring Stretch)	Scratch God; Master O.C.	4:02
5.	"Get 'Em Up"	Scratch God; DLB; Master O.C.	4:20
6.	"Candy"	Kool Moe Dee	4:18
7.	"Doin' My Thang"	Scratch God; DLB; Master O.C.	4:53
8.	"Bang Bang"	Scratch God; DLB; Master O.C.	4:46
9.	"Yes, Yes, Y'all"	Scratch God; DLB; Master O.C.	4:28
10.	"Soul to Soul"	Scratch God; DLB; Master O.C.	4:08
11.	"It's Alright Here"	Scratch God; DLB; Master O.C.	5:00
12.	"Are You Wit It"	Kool Moe Dee	4:30
13.	"Interlude"		2:03
Total length:			53:40

== Personnel ==
- Mohandes Dewese – vocals, producer (tracks: 6, 12)
- Eyon C. Mason – vocals (track 6)
- John Otto – guitar, bass, artwork
- Ahmad Wyatt – keyboards & scratches (tracks: 1–5, 7, 9–11), producer (tracks: 2–5, 7–11)
- Oscar Rodriguez Jr. – producer (tracks: 2–5, 7–11)
- Darryll LeRoy Barksdale – producer (tracks: 2–3, 5, 7–11)
- Tamara Rafkin – artwork
