= St. Elizabeth of Hungary Church =

Catholic church in Manhattan, New York

Coordinates: 40°46′36.02″N 73°57′16.2″W

Church of St. Elizabeth of Hungary
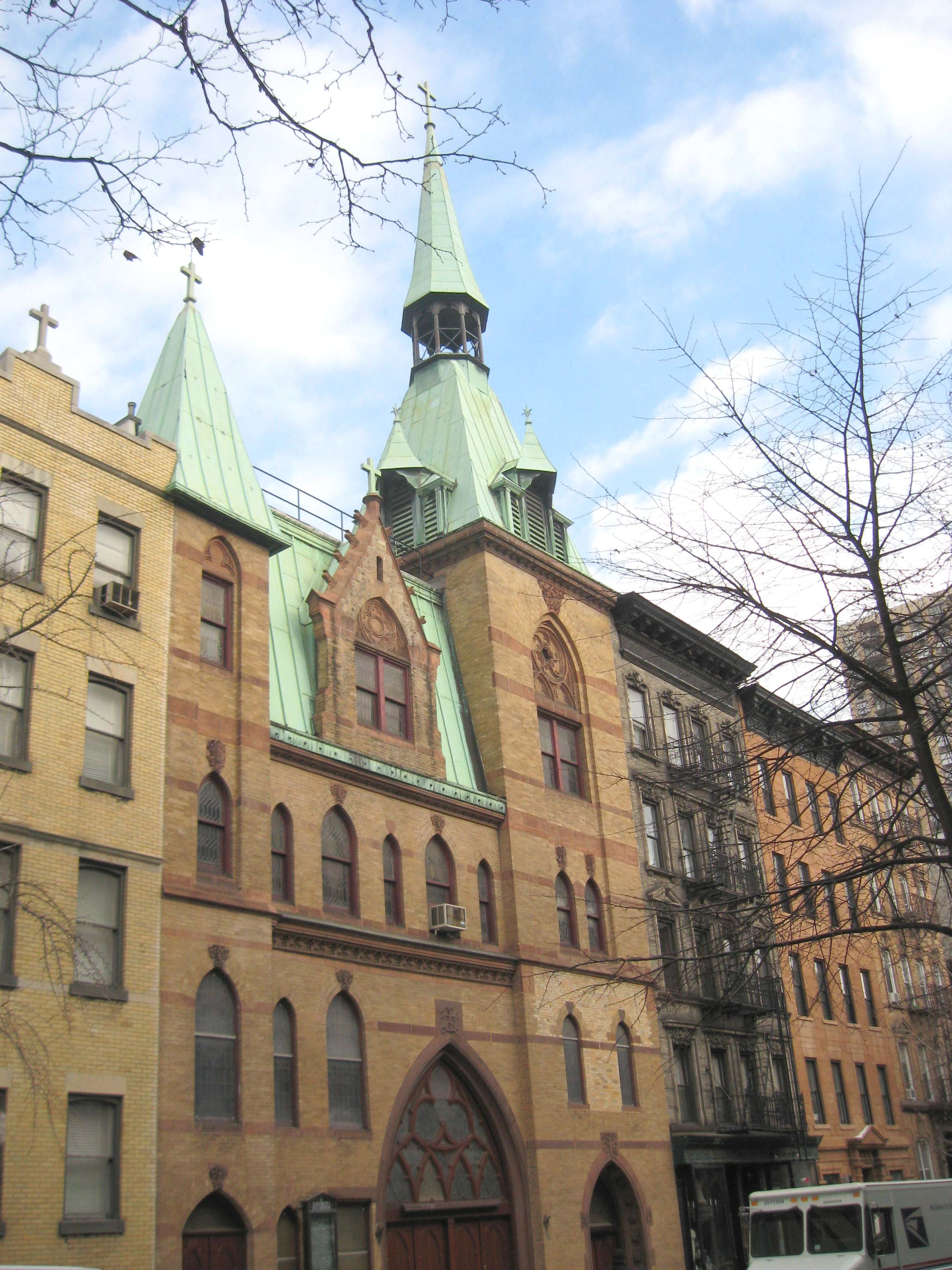
- Front view

General information
- Architectural style: Gothic Revival
- Location: Manhattan, New York City, United States
- Completed: 1918
- Client: Archdiocese of New York

Technical details
- Structural system: Masonry brick with terracotta trim

Design and construction
- Architect: ?

Website
- St. Elizabeth of Hungary Church, Manhattan

The Church of St. Elizabeth of Hungary was a Roman Catholic parish church in the Roman Catholic Archdiocese of New York, located at 211 East 83rd Street, between Second Avenue and Third Avenue, on the Upper East Side of Manhattan in New York City. St. Elizabeth's was founded by Slovak immigrants on the Lower East Side in 1891, and the Upper East Side building was completed in 1918. The Archdiocese of New York issued a decree to close the church on June 30, 2017.

== History ==
St. Elizabeth's was founded by Slovak immigrants on the Lower East Side, with the first Mass celebrated on April 26, 1891, in the basement of St. Brigid's Church on 8th Street and Avenue B. The first church building was located 345 East 4th Street, which hosted its first Mass on August 7, 1892. A special feature of The New York Times in 1901, mentioned the church, listed as "the Hungarian church," among other Catholic structures on the Lower East Side of Manhattan, describing the group "for the most part...limit[ing] themselves to the functions of a parish church, in districts where social needs are otherwise supplied." Without comment on other facilities attached.

As parishioners relocated, it became necessary to move the parish. The former Second Emmanuel Lutheran Church church on East 83rd Street, built in 1892, became the new home for St. Elizabeth's on June 7, 1917. It underwent several expansions in the following decades.

As the local Slovak population declined later in the 20th century, Cardinal Cooke redesignated it as a church for the deaf Catholics of New York on July 1, 1980.

In November 2014, the Archdiocese announced that the Church of St. Elizabeth of Hungary was one of 31 neighborhood parishes which would be merged into other parishes. St. Elizabeth of Hungary and St. Stephen of Hungary were to be merged into the Church of St. Monica at 413 East 79th Street.

The Archdiocese of New York issued a decree to close the church on June 30, 2017. This decision, along with the earlier decision to merge, was appealed to the Vatican by parishioners. While the appeals were still pending, the property was contracted for sale for $11.8M by the Diocese to Robert Saffayeh Development in 2024. Removal of religious items from the church began on May 28, 2024. The New York City Landmarks Preservation Commission had considered designating the church as a landmark but ultimately declined to do so.

== Building ==
The 2010 edition of the AIA Guide to New York City neglects to mention an architect, describing the Gothic Revival church as "a classy, spired neo-Gothic exterior, but the treat is within: ascent the stairs to view a just heavenly groin-vaulted ceiling painted in the colors of Ravenna's mosaics."
