= Freakin' It =

Single by Will Smith

from the album Willenium
- Released: March 22, 2000
- Recorded: 1999
- Genre: Hip hop; R&B; disco
- Length: 3:59
- Label: Columbia
- Songwriters: Samuel Barnes, Jean-Claude Olivier, Lennie Bennett, Pam Sawyer, Marilyn McLeod, Bernard Edwards, Nile Rodgers
- Producers: Barnes & Bennett

Will Smith singles chronology
"Will 2K" (1999)	"Freakin' It" (2000)	"Black Suits Comin' (Nod Ya Head)" (2002)

"Freakin' It" is a song by American rapper Will Smith. It was released as the third and final single from his second studio album, Willennium. The single was released on March 22, 2000. The song was written and composed by Smith with a selection of other songwriters, including those of the Diana Ross chart single "Love Hangover", whose fast-paced bassline it samples, and was produced by two of those others, "Trackmasters" Samuel Barnes and Lennie Bennett. The single peaked at number 15 on the UK Singles Chart.

== Music video ==
The music video for "Freakin' It" premiered in February 2000, at a total length of four minutes and thirteen seconds. The video was later added to Smith's official Vevo account on March 24, 2011. The video features Smith performing the selection on a series of streets in Philadelphia in wintry conditions, as he paid homage to his hometown. (Smith is a native of the West Philadelphia neighborhood of Overbrook, after which he has named his production company.)

== Track listing ==
- UK CD #1
1. "Freakin' It" – 3:59
2. "Holla Back" – 4:19
3. "Gettin' Jiggy wit It" (New Video Mix) – 3:48
- UK CD #2
1. "Freakin' It" (Trackmasters House Mix) – 5:32
2. "Candy" (featuring Cameo) – 3:56
3. "Just The Two of Us" (Rodney Jerkins Remix) (featuring Brian McKnight) – 5:16
- UK Cassette
1. "Freakin' It" – 3:59
2. "Holla Back" – 4:19
- European single CD
1. "Freakin' It" – 3:59
2. "So Fresh" – 3:36
- European Maxi-CD
1. "Freakin' It" – 3:59
2. "Holla Back" – 4:19
3. "Freakin' It" (Trackmasters House Mix) – 5:32
4. "Freakin' It" (Trackmasters House Instrumental) – 5:32
- America
1. "Freakin' It" – 3:59
2. "Freakin' It" (instrumental) – 3:59
3. "Freakin' It" (a cappella) – 3:59
4. "Freakin' It" (Trackmasters House Mix) – 5:32
5. "Freakin' It" (Trackmasters House Instrumental) – 5:32
6. "Pump Me Up" – 4:05 (Performed by DJ Jazzy Jeff & The Fresh Prince)

== Charts ==
Weekly chart performance
Chart (2000)	Peak position
Australia (ARIA)	56
Belgium (Ultratip Bubbling Under Flanders)	2
Belgium (Ultratop 50 Wallonia)	32
Germany (GfK)	70
Ireland (IRMA)	33
Netherlands (Dutch Top 40 Tipparade)	9
Netherlands (Single Top 100)	60
Scandinavian Airplay (M&M)	17
Scottish Singles Sales (Official Charts)	16
Switzerland (Schweizer Hitparade)	44
UK Singles (Official Charts)	15
US Billboard Hot 100	99
US Dance Singles Sales (Billboard)	4
US Hot R&B/Hip-Hop Songs (Billboard)	77
US Pop Airplay (Billboard)	40
US Rhythmic Airplay (Billboard)	35
