= Katreese Barnes =

American musician, musical director, and songwriter (1963–2019)

Katreese Barnes (January 3, 1963 – August 3, 2019) was an American musician, musical director, and songwriter, best known for being half of the pop duo Juicy with her brother Jerry Barnes, and her work on the music of Saturday Night Live, including the Emmy-winning hit "Dick in a Box". She died in 2019 at the age of 56, following a decades-long battle against breast cancer.
