= Will 2K =

1999 single by Will Smith

Single by Will Smith

from the album Willennium
- Released: November 8, 1999
- Length: 3:53
- Label: Columbia
- Songwriters: Will Smith; Lennie Bennett; Cedric Hailey; Darren Henson; Joe Strummer; Mick Jones; Paul Simonon; Nicholas Headon; Bobby Robinson
- Producer: Trackmasters

Will Smith singles chronology
| "Wild Wild West" (1999) | "Will 2K" (1999) | "Freakin' It" (2000) |

"Will 2K" is a song by American rapper Will Smith, released as the second single from his second solo studio album, Willennium (1999), on November 8, 1999. Sampling instruments and lyrics from the chorus of the Clash's "Rock the Casbah", as well as bits from "Superappin' #2" by Grandmaster Flash and the Furious Five, the song was co-written by Smith and produced by Trackmasters. The song features vocals from K-Ci. "Will 2K" peaked at number two in the United Kingdom and pays homage to the new millennium.

== Music video ==
The music video for "Will 2K" premiered in September 1999, at a total length of five minutes and two seconds. The video features Smith in a variety of settings, appearing in a series of musical eras and wearing costumes that reflect each epoch. DJ Jazzy Jeff, K-Ci, Eve, Tisha Campbell-Martin and then-husband Duane Martin, among others, make cameos in the video.

== Track listings ==
- US 7-inch single

A. "Will 2K" (featuring K-Ci) – 3:56
B. "Will 2K" (instrumental featuring K-Ci) – 3:56

- US 12-inch single
1. "Will 2K" (album version featuring K-Ci) – 3:56
2. "Will 2K" (instrumental featuring K-Ci) – 3:56
3. "Will 2K" (a cappella featuring K-Ci) – 3:56
- Australian CD single
1. "Will 2K" (featuring K-Ci) – 3:56
2. "So Fresh" (featuring Biz Markie and Slick Rick) – 4:27
3. "Just Cruisin'" – 4:11
4. "Miami" – 3:19
- UK CD1
1. "Will 2K" (featuring K-Ci) – 3:56
2. "Just Cruisin'" – 3:59
3. "Miami" – 3:18
- UK CD2
1. "Will 2K" (featuring K-Ci) – 3:56
2. "So Fresh" (featuring Biz Markie and Slick Rick) – 4:27
3. "Just the Two of Us" (Rodney Jerkins Remix featuring Brian McKnight) – 4:14
- UK cassette single and European CD single
1. "Will 2K" (featuring K-Ci) – 3:56
2. "So Fresh" (featuring Biz Markie and Slick Rick) – 4:27

== Charts ==
=== Weekly charts ===
Weekly chart performance
| Chart (1999–2000) | Peak position |
|---|---|
| Australia (ARIA) | 3 |
| Belgium (Ultratop 50 Flanders) | 27 |
| Belgium (Ultratop 50 Wallonia) | 13 |
| Canada (Nielsen SoundScan) | 12 |
| Canada Top Singles (RPM) | 5 |
| Canada Dance/Urban (RPM) | 4 |
| Canada CHR (Nielsen BDS) | 4 |
| Denmark (IFPI) | 10 |
| Europe (Eurochart Hot 100) | 8 |
| Europe (European Radio Top 50) | 3 |
| Finland (Suomen virallinen lista) | 10 |
| France (SNEP) | 32 |
| Germany (GfK) | 40 |
| Hungary (Mahasz) | 3 |
| Ireland (IRMA) | 12 |
| Italy (Musica e Dischi) | 15 |
| Italy Airplay (Music & Media) | 15 |
| Netherlands (Dutch Top 40) | 8 |
| Netherlands (Single Top 100) | 11 |
| Netherlands Airplay (Music & Media) | 8 |
| New Zealand (Recorded Music NZ) | 6 |
| Norway (VG-lista) | 4 |
| Poland Airplay (Music & Media) | 2 |
| Scottish Singles Sales (Official Charts) | 9 |
| Spain (Promusicae) | 5 |
| Spain Airplay (Music & Media) | 10 |
| Sweden (Sverigetopplistan) | 16 |
| Switzerland (Schweizer Hitparade) | 23 |
| UK Singles (Official Charts) | 2 |
| UK Airplay (Music Week) | 10 |
| UK Hip Hop/R&B (Official Charts) | 1 |
| US Billboard Hot 100 | 25 |
| US Hot R&B/Hip-Hop Songs (Billboard) | 66 |
| US Hot Rap Songs (Billboard) | 35 |
| US Rhythmic Airplay (Billboard) | 14 |

=== Year-end charts ===
Year-end chart performance
| Chart (1999) | Position |
|---|---|
| Canada Top Singles (RPM) | 100 |
| Netherlands (Dutch Top 40) | 88 |
| UK Singles (OCC) | 78 |
| US Rhythmic Top 40 (Billboard) | 99 |

| Chart (2000) | Position |
|---|---|
| US Mainstream Top 40 (Billboard) | 92 |

== Certifications ==
Certifications for "Will 2K"
| Region | Certification | Certified units/sales |
|---|---|---|
| Australia (ARIA) | Gold | 35,000^{^} |
| New Zealand (RMNZ) | Gold | 5,000^{*} |
| United Kingdom (BPI) | Silver | 200,000^{^} |
^{*} Sales figures based on certification alone.^{^} Shipments figures based on certification alone.

== Release history ==
Release dates and formats
| Region | Date | Format(s) | Label(s) | Ref. |
|---|---|---|---|---|
| United States | October 19, 1999 | Contemporary hit; urban radio | Columbia | |
| United Kingdom | November 8, 1999 | CD; cassette | Columbia | |
| United States | November 16, 1999 | 12-inch vinyl | Columbia | |
| Japan | January 26, 2000 | CD | Sony | |
