= Wild Wild West (Will Smith song) =

1999 single by Will Smith

Single by Will Smith featuring Dru Hill and Kool Moe Dee

from the album Wild Wild West: Music Inspired by the Motion Picture and Willennium
- B-side: "Y'all Know"; "Chasing Forever"
- Released: May 11, 1999
- Genre: Country rap; pop rap
- Length: 4:05 (album version); 3:29 (radio version)
- Label: Overbrook; Columbia
- Songwriters: Kool Moe Dee; Rob Fusari; Will Smith; Stevie Wonder
- Producers: Rob Fusari; Mark Wilson

Will Smith singles chronology
"Miami" (1998)	"Wild Wild West" (1999)	"Will 2K" (1999)

Kool Moe Dee singles chronology
"Rise N Shine" (1991)	"Wild Wild West" (1999)	"Downtown" (2015)

Dru Hill singles chronology
"These Are the Times" (1998)	"Wild Wild West" (1999)	"You Are Everything" (1999)

Music video
- "Wild Wild West" on YouTube

"Wild Wild West" is a song by American rapper and actor Will Smith from the 1999 steampunk Western comedy film Wild Wild West, in which he also starred. The song plays during the film's closing credits. The single includes parts of the chorus from Kool Moe Dee's song of the same name, and samples Stevie Wonder's 1976 hit song "I Wish". Kool Moe Dee re-performed the chorus for the song, and additional guest vocals are provided by Dru Hill. The album version of the song is introduced by a brief spoken-word interlude where Smith asks his infant son Jaden what song he should play next, interpreting Jaden's repeated non-verbal response as "Wild Wild West".

"Wild Wild West" was released on May 11, 1999, as a single from the film's soundtrack and as the lead single from Smith's second studio album, Willennium (1999). The song became a number-one hit on the US Billboard Hot 100, and its extended music video, directed by Paul Hunter, features Wonder and several other celebrities as guest stars. The song was nominated for Best Rap Solo Performance at the 42nd Annual Grammy Awards in 2000.

== Music video ==
Directed by Paul Hunter, the music video includes several dialog sequences featuring Smith, Kool Moe Dee, Dru Hill, and a guest appearance by Stevie Wonder, intercut with clips from the film, featuring the film's characters. Salma Hayek also appears as her character Rita Escobar in the video's dialog sequences, as does an actor resembling Kenneth Branagh and his character of Dr. Loveless. Latin pop star Enrique Iglesias also appeared in the video playing a prince. The Fresh Prince of Bel-Air co-star and tap dancer Alfonso Ribeiro appeared in the music video as one of the dancers. Other cameos include actor Larenz Tate, Shari Headley, singer/writer/producer Babyface, Sisqó, and rapper MC Lyte.

== Track listings ==
US CD and cassette single

1. "Wild Wild West" – 4:05
2. "Y'all Know" – 3:57

Australian and Japanese CD single

1. "Wild Wild West" – 4:05
2. "Wild Wild West" (radio version) – 3:29
3. "Wild Wild West" (a cappella) – 4:05
4. "Miami" (Miami mix) – 4:40
5. "Just the Two of Us" (Rodney Jerkins remix featuring Brian McKnight) – 4:14

European CD single

1. "Wild Wild West" – 4:08
2. "Wild Wild West" (instrumental) – 4:08

UK CD1

1. "Wild Wild West" – 4:05
2. "Gettin' Jiggy wit It" – 3:48
3. "Big Willie Style" (featuring Left Eye) – 3:35

UK CD2

1. "Wild Wild West" – 4:05
2. "Miami" (Jason Nevins' Live on South Beach dub) – 5:10
3. "Chasing Forever" – 4:16

UK cassette single

1. "Wild Wild West" – 4:05
2. "Big Willie Style" (featuring Left Eye) – 3:35

== Charts ==
=== Weekly charts ===
Chart (1999)	Peak position
Australia (ARIA)	8
Austria (Ö3 Austria Top 40)	5
Belgium (Ultratop 50 Flanders)	5
Belgium (Ultratop 50 Wallonia)	3
Canada (Nielsen SoundScan)	2
Canada Top Singles (RPM)	3
Canada Adult Contemporary (RPM)	37
Canada Dance/Urban (RPM)	5
Czech Republic (IFPI)	28
Denmark (IFPI)	3
Europe (Eurochart Hot 100)	1
Finland (Suomen virallinen lista)	6
France (SNEP)	4
Germany (GfK)	3
Greece (IFPI)	5
Honduras (Notimex)	3
Hungary (Mahasz)	3
Ireland (IRMA)	4
Italy (Musica e dischi)	5
Italy Airplay (Music & Media)	1
Netherlands (Dutch Top 40)	3
Netherlands (Single Top 100)	2
New Zealand (Recorded Music NZ)	2
Nicaragua (Notimex)	4
Norway (VG-lista)	2
Scottish Singles Sales (Official Charts)	5
Spain (Promusicae)	4
Sweden (Sverigetopplistan)	4
Switzerland (Schweizer Hitparade)	2
UK Singles (Official Charts)	2
UK Hip Hop/R&B (Official Charts)	1
US Billboard Hot 100	1
US Hot Latin Songs (Billboard)	39
US Hot R&B/Hip-Hop Songs (Billboard)	3
US Hot Rap Songs (Billboard)	1
US Pop Airplay (Billboard)	4
US Rhythmic Airplay (Billboard)	4

=== Year-end charts ===
Chart (1999)	Position
Australia (ARIA)	49
Belgium (Ultratop 50 Flanders)	38
Belgium (Ultratop 50 Wallonia)	13
Canada Top Singles (RPM)	20
Canada Dance/Urban (RPM)	45
Europe (Eurochart Hot 100)	17
France (SNEP)	20
Germany (Media Control)	25
Netherlands (Dutch Top 40)	43
Netherlands (Single Top 100)	29
New Zealand (RIANZ)	42
Romania (Romanian Top 100)	7
Spain (AFYVE)	14
Sweden (Hitlistan)	34
Switzerland (Schweizer Hitparade)	9
UK Singles (OCC)	32
UK Airplay (Music Week)	40
US Billboard Hot 100	33
US Hot R&B/Hip-Hop Singles & Tracks (Billboard)	61
US Hot Rap Singles (Billboard)	14
US Mainstream Top 40 (Billboard)	38
US Rhythmic Top 40 (Billboard)	27

== Certifications ==
Region	Certification	Certified units/sales
Australia (ARIA)	Gold	35,000^{^}
Belgium (BRMA)	Platinum	50,000^{*}
France (SNEP)	Gold	250,000^{*}
Germany (BVMI)	Gold	250,000^{^}
New Zealand (RMNZ)	Gold	5,000^{*}
Norway (IFPI Norway)	Gold	
Switzerland (IFPI Switzerland)	Gold	25,000^{^}
United Kingdom (BPI)	Gold	480,000
United States (RIAA)	Gold	500,000
^{*} Sales figures based on certification alone.^{^} Shipments figures based on certification alone.

== Release history ==
Region	Date	Format(s)	Label(s)	Ref.
United States	May 11, 1999	Rhythmic contemporary; contemporary hit radio	Overbrook; Columbia	
United States	May 24, 1999	Urban radio	Overbrook; Columbia	
United Kingdom	June 28, 1999	CD; cassette	Columbia	
Canada	July 6, 1999	CD	Overbrook; Columbia	
United States	July 6, 1999	Commercial	Overbrook; Columbia	
Japan	July 7, 1999	CD	SME	

== In popular culture ==
- The song is featured as a playable song in the music rhythm game Just Dance 4. If the song is completed on the Extreme Version with 5 stars, players receive the "New Sheriff in Town" achievement.
- OutsideXbox's Andy Farrant is known for having memorized the song and rapping portions of it during the Oxventure Dungeons & Dragons campaign quest Wild Wild Woods.
- The song has been featured as the intro to Matt and Shane's Secret Podcast since 2016.
- Wild Wild West is sampled in Neil Cicierega's mashup album Mouth Moods, specifically the song "Wow Wow".
- In the Abbott Elementary season 4 episode "Ringworm," the characters end a PTA meeting by line-dancing to "Wild Wild West."
