= Wild Wild West (soundtrack) =

Wild Wild West: Music Inspired by the Motion Picture

Soundtrack album by various artists
- Released: June 15, 1999
- Recorded: 1998–99
- Genres: Hip hop; R&B
- Length: 1:02:19
- Labels: Overbrook; Interscope

Singles from Wild Wild West
- 1. "Wild Wild West" Released: May 11, 1999 (US); 2. "Bailamos" Released: June 18, 1999

Professional ratings
Review scores
Source	Rating
AllMusic	3/5 stars

Wild Wild West is an album of music inspired by the 1999 film of the same name. It was released on June 15, 1999, through Will Smith's Overbrook Entertainment and Interscope Records and consisted mostly of hip hop and R&B songs which were not in the film, with the exception of one by Will Smith and another by Enrique Iglesias played over the end credits. Other artists featured on the album include BLACKstreet, Faith Evans, Dr. Dre, Common, MC Lyte, Tatyana Ali, Slick Rick, Jermaine Dupri and Eminem. The soundtrack was a commercial success, peaking at number four on the US Billboard 200 and on the Top R&B/Hip-Hop Albums and features the hit single "Wild Wild West" which went to number one on the US Billboard Hot 100. The album was certified double platinum a week after its release, June 21, 1999. The album is also the debut of famous artists Lil' Bow Wow, Jill Scott and Kel Spencer.

== Track listing ==
No.	Title	Writer(s)	Producer(s)	Length
1.	"Wild Wild West" (Will Smith featuring Dru Hill and Kool Moe Dee)	Will Smith; Mohandas Dewese; Rob Fusari; Stevie Wonder	Rob Fusari, Mark Wilson (add.)	4:08
2.	"Bailamos" (Enrique Iglesias)	Paul Barry; Mark Taylor	The Groove Brothers (Mark Taylor, Brian Rawling)	3:39
3.	"Confused" (BLACKstreet)	Teddy Riley; Rodney Jerkins; Sherri Blair; LaMenga Kafi	Teddy Riley, Rodney Jerkins	3:58
4.	"Keep It Movin'" (MC Lyte and Monica Payne)	Lana Moorer; Tim Kelley; Bob Robinson; Giovanni Salah	Tim & Bob	4:13
5.	"Getting Closer" (Tatyana Ali featuring Kel Spencer)	Lennie Bennett; Tamara Savage; Carsten Schack; Kenneth Karlin; Darryl Barnes; Greg Mays; George Clinton Jr.; Garry Shider; Bernie Worrell; Roy Hammond	Soulshock and Karlin	4:12
6.	"Lucky Day" (Trā-Knox)	Anthony Dent; Eric Roberson; Jeffery Walker	Dent, J-Dub	4:18
7.	"Bad Guys Always Die" (Dr. Dre and Eminem)	Marshall Mathers; André Young	Dr. Dre, Mel-Man	4:41
8.	"Mailman" (Faith Evans)	R. Kelly	R. Kelly	3:26
9.	"I'm Wanted" (Kel Spencer featuring Richie Sambora)	Lennie Bennett; Tamara Savage; Richie Sambora; Rick Cousins; Jon Bongiovi	Dutch	5:12
10.	"Hero" (Breeze)	Will Smith; Curtis Wilson; Lia Grant; Sydney Kim; Sandy Plute; Katherine Shorey; Bola Sete; Djalma de Andrade	Somethin' for the People	4:06
11.	"Chocolate Form" (Neutral)	Eric Roberson; Carvin Haggins; Vidal Davis; Keith Pelzer	Carvin G. Haggins, Keith I. Pelzer	4:12
12.	"I Sparkle" (Slick Rick)	Ricky Walters; William Paul Mitchell	Large Professor	4:11
13.	"The Best" (Guy featuring 1 Life 2 Live)	Teddy Riley; Tijuan Frampton; Albert Charles; Juan Cordova	Teddy Riley	3:40
14.	"8 Minutes to Sunrise" (Common featuring Jill Scott)	Lonnie Lynn; Jill Scott; Andre Harris	Andre Harris	4:32
15.	"Stick Up" (Lil' Bow Wow featuring Jermaine Dupri)	Jermaine Dupri; Rahman Griffin; James Harris III; Terry Lewis	Jermaine Dupri	3:17
Total length:				1:02:19

== Charts ==
=== Weekly charts ===
Chart (1999)	Peak position
Austrian Albums (Ö3 Austria)	28
Canada Top Albums/CDs (RPM)	7
Dutch Albums (Album Top 100)	75
French Albums (SNEP)	64
German Albums (Offizielle Top 100)	31
Hungarian Albums (MAHASZ)	11
New Zealand Albums (RMNZ)	27
Norwegian Albums (VG-lista)	24
Swedish Albums (Sverigetopplistan)	42
Swiss Albums (Schweizer Hitparade)	17
US Billboard 200	4
US Top R&B/Hip-Hop Albums (Billboard)	4

=== Year-end charts ===
Chart (1999)	Position
Canada Top Albums/CDs (RPM)	49
US Billboard 200	63
US Top R&B/Hip-Hop Albums (Billboard)	67

== Certifications ==
Region	Certification	Certified units/sales
Canada (Music Canada)	Platinum	100,000^{^}
United States (RIAA)	2× Platinum	2,000,000^{^}
^{^} Shipments figures based on certification alone.
