= How Ya Like Me Now =

Studio album by Kool Moe Dee
- Released: November 3, 1987
- Studios: Battery, London, UK
- Genres: Hip hop; new jack swing
- Length: 49:51
- Labels: Jive; RCA
- Producers: Kool Moe Dee; Teddy Riley; Bryan "Chuck" New; LaVaba Mallison; Pete Q. Harris

Kool Moe Dee chronology
Kool Moe Dee (1986)	How Ya Like Me Now (1987)	Knowledge Is King (1989)

Singles from How Ya Like Me Now
- 1. "How Ya Like Me Now" Released: 1987; 2. "Wild Wild West" Released: 1987; 3. "No Respect" Released: 1987

Music video
- "How Ya Like Me Now" on YouTube

Music video
- "Wild Wild West" on YouTube

Music video
- "No Respect" on YouTube

How Ya Like Me Now is the second solo studio album by American rapper Kool Moe Dee from the Treacherous Three. It was recorded at Battery Studios in London, England, and released on November 3, 1987, via Jive Records.

The album was produced by Teddy Riley, Bryan "Chuck" New, LaVaba Mallison, Pete Q. Harris, and Kool Moe Dee. It peaked at No. 35 on the Billboard 200 and No. 4 on the Top R&B/Hip-Hop Albums. It is his best-selling album to date, achieving platinum certification by the RIAA. The album spawned three singles: "How Ya Like Me Now", "Wild Wild West" and "No Respect".

== Recording and production ==
Mixing and recording for How Ya Like Me Now took place in London at Battery Studios. Alongside Kool Moe Dee, audio production was shared with and handled by Teddy Riley, Bryan "Chuck" New, LaVaba Mallison and Pete Q. Harris, with whom he worked on his previous self-titled album.

On the front cover made by Doug Rowell, Moe Dee takes musical aim at rival rapper LL Cool J, by crushing a red Kangol hat under a front wheel of the Jeep Wrangler in the backdrop. The long running feud began when Kool Moe Dee claimed that LL had stolen his rap style. He also felt that LL was disrespecting rap pioneers like Melle Mel and Grandmaster Caz, by proclaiming that he was "rap's new grandmaster" without paying due respect to those who came before him. The feud persisted into the mid-1990s with more songs, and ended with both MCs proclaiming themselves the victor.

The photograph was taken on 4th St in Manhattan between Avenues C and D in Alphabet City, in an empty lot across from the San Isidoro y San Leandro Western Orthodox Catholic Church of the Hispanic Mozarabic Rite. Moe Dee references aspects the neighborhood in lyrics on the album.

== Release and promotion ==
Following Kool Moe Dee, How Ya Like Me Now was released through Jive Records with distribution by RCA Records, making it Kool Moe Dee's second album on the label. It was dropped on November 3, 1987, and was supported by three singles: "How Ya Like Me Now", "Wild Wild West" and "No Respect", and its music videos.

The title track peaked at No. 22 on the US Billboard Hot R&B/Hip-Hop Songs and No. 86 on the UK Singles Chart. "Wild Wild West" peaked at No. 62 on the US Billboard Hot 100 and No. 4 on the US Billboard Hot R&B/Hip-Hop Songs.

== Reception ==
=== Commercial ===
Reaching a peak position of number thirty-five on the US Billboard 200, How Ya Like Me Now remained on the chart for a total of 50 weeks. The album has been certified gold by the Recording Industry Association of America on April 14, 1988, and went platinum on November 14, 1988, indicating US sales of over one million units.

=== Critical ===
Professional ratings
Review scores
Source	Rating
AllMusic	4.5/5 stars
Robert Christgau	A−
New Musical Express	8/10

In a contemporary review, the Washington Post compared the album to work by hip hop artists Schooly D and LL Cool J, stating that Kool Moe Dee "comes across like a hip guidance couselor" and that the album was a "def aural collage: James Brown beats on the title cut, Queen on "Rock You" even Paul Simon on "50 Ways". The production is sophisticated without sacrificing the improvisational swagger that is central to rap's appeal." American music journalist Robert Christgau described the album as "out-of-kilter swing generated by his electronic percussion [...] - trick rhymes, variable lengths, filters, double tracks, sung refrains, and the occasional extra instrument all work to shift the beat without undercutting its dominance". Alex Henderson of AllMusic said that Kool Moe Dee "had a major hit with his sophomore effort" and that "it definitely has its share of classics".

== Accolades ==
In 2017, the album was ranked #35 on Consequence of Sound Top 50 Albums of 1987, and #41 of Complex 50 Greatest Rap Albums 1980s.

== Legacy ==
In 2008, "How Ya Like Me Now" was ranked at No. 31 on VH1's "100 Greatest Hip Hop Songs". In 2017, it was used in the Empire episode "Strange Bedfellows".

== Track listing ==
No.	Title	Length
1.	"How Ya Like Me Now"	5:37
2.	"Wild Wild West"	4:40
3.	"Way Way Back"	4:32
4.	"50 Ways"	5:00
5.	"No Respect"	5:24
6.	"Don't Dance"	4:25
7.	"I'm a Player"	3:37
8.	"Suckers"	4:44
9.	"Stupid"	4:25
10.	"Rock You"	3:57
11.	"Get Paid"	3:19
Total length:		49:51

== Personnel ==
- Mohandes Dewese – vocals, producer
- Bryan Chuck New – mixing, engineer, producer
- Edward Theodore Riley – producer
- Peter Brian Harris – producer
- LaVaba Mallison – producer
- Doug Rowell – photography
- Kofi Tuda – grooming

== Charts ==
Album

Chart (1988)	Peak position
US Billboard Top R&B/Hip-Hop Albums	4
US Billboard 200	35

Singles

Year	Song	Peak positions		
Year	Song	US Billboard Hot 100	US Billboard Hot R&B/Hip-Hop Songs	UK Singles Chart
1987	"How Ya Like Me Now"	—	22	86
1988	"Wild Wild West"	62	4	—
1988	"No Respect"	—	—	—

== Certifications ==
Region	Certification	Certified units/sales
United States (RIAA)	Platinum	1,000,000^{^}
^{^} Shipments figures based on certification alone.
