= How Ya Like Me Now (song) =

Single by Kool Moe Dee

from the album How Ya Like Me Now
- Released: 1987
- Recorded: 1987
- Studio: Battery Studios, London, UK
- Genre: Hip hop
- Length: 5:37 (album version); 3:57 (edit)
- Label: Jive
- Songwriters: Mohandas Dewese; Teddy Riley
- Producers: Kool Moe Dee; Teddy Riley

Kool Moe Dee singles chronology
"Do You Know What Time It Is?" (1987)	"How Ya Like Me Now" (1987)	"Wild Wild West" (1987)

Music video
- "How Ya Like Me Now on YouTube

"How Ya Like Me Now" is a song by American rapper Kool Moe Dee. It was released in 1987 as the first single from his second studio album of the same name.

Produced and written in collaboration with Teddy Riley, the song is a diss-track to rival rapper LL Cool J.

The song became Kool Moe Dee's first to appear on the Billboard Hot R&B/Hip-Hop Songs, peaked at No. 22 in January 1988 and stayed on the chart for 18 weeks. Also peaked No. 86 on the UK Singles Chart.

"How Ya Like Me Now" was No. 31 on VH1's 100 Greatest Songs of Hip Hop list.

== Charts ==
Chart (1988)	Peak position
UK Singles (Official Charts)	86
US Hot R&B/Hip-Hop Songs (Billboard)	22

== See also ==
- List of notable diss tracks
