= Knowledge Is King =

Studio album by Kool Moe Dee
- Released: May 30, 1989
- Studios: Soundtrack Studios (New York, NY) Unique Recording Studios, New York City
- Genre: Hip hop
- Length: 44:32
- Label: Jive
- Producers: Kool Moe Dee; Teddy Riley; LaVaba Mallison; Pete Q. Harris

Kool Moe Dee chronology
How Ya Like Me Now (1987)	Knowledge Is King (1989)	Funke, Funke Wisdom (1991)

Professional ratings
Review scores
Source	Rating
AllMusic	3/5 stars
Robert Christgau	B+
The Rolling Stone Album Guide	4/5 stars

Knowledge Is King is the third solo studio album by American rapper Kool Moe Dee, released on May 30, 1989, via Jive Records.

== Background ==
The album was recorded at Soundtrack Studios in New York City, New York. Production for the album was handled by Teddy Riley, LaVaba Mallison, Pete Q. Harris, and Kool Moe Dee himself. The record peaked at number 25 on the Billboard 200 and number 2 on the Top R&B/Hip-Hop Albums. It is his second best-selling album, achieving gold certification by the RIAA on August 22, 1989 (his previous album How Ya Like Me Now was certified platinum).

The album spawned four charted singles: "Let's Go", "All Night Long", "I Go to Work", and "They Want Money". "They Want Money" went the most successful single of the effort, peaking at #3 on the Hot R&B/Hip-Hop Songs, #2 on the Hot Rap Songs and #91 on the UK Singles Chart. "I Go to Work" peaked at #13 on the Hot R&B/Hip-Hop Songs and #5 on the Hot Rap Songs, while "All Night Long" peaked at #70 on the Hot R&B/Hip-Hop Songs. "Let's Go", a bonus diss track towards Kool Moe Dee's foe LL Cool J that appeared only on CD releases in the UK, Europe and Japan, was first released in 1987 as a b-side to the 12″ single of "How Ya Like Me Now" and had peaked at #11 on the Hot R&B/Hip-Hop Songs in 1988.

== Track listing ==
No.	Title	Writer(s)	Length
1.	"They Want Money"	M. Dewese; T. Riley	3:52
2.	"The Avenue"	M. Dewese	3:46
3.	"I Go to Work"	M. Dewese	4:40
4.	"All Night Long"	M. Dewese	4:11
5.	"Knowledge is King"	M. Dewese; P. Harris	3:38
6.	"I'm Hittin' Hard"	M. Dewese	4:34
7.	"Get the Picture"	M. Dewese; L. Mallison	5:19
8.	"I'm Blowin' Up"	M. Dewese	4:55
9.	"The Don"	M. Dewese	5:10
10.	"Pump Your Fist"	M. Dewese	4:27
11.	"Let's Go"	M. Dewese	5:24
Total length:			44:32

Notes

- Track 11 is a CD bonus track on releases in UK, Europe and Japan. It is omitted from all LP and cassette versions and from North American CD versions.

Sample credits

- "They Want Money" contains elements from "Get on the Good Foot" by James Brown and "It's Just Begun" by Jimmy Castor
- "The Avenue" contains elements from "White Lines (Don't Don't Do It)" by Grandmaster Melle Mel and "Down on the Avenue" by Fat Larry's Band
- "I Go to Work" contains elements from "Super Bad" by James Brown and "Think (About It)" by Lyn Collins
- "All Night Long" contains elements from "Groove Me" by King Floyd
- "Knowledge is King" contains elements from "Funky Drummer" by James Brown and "I Get Lifted" by KC & the Sunshine Band
- "I'm Hittin' Hard" contains elements from "Brother Green (The Disco King)" by Roy Ayers and "The Wildstyle" by Time Zone
- "Get the Picture" contains elements from "Gotta Be Funky" by Monk Higgins & The Specialties
- "I'm Blowin' Up" contains elements from "UFO" by ESG and "Funky Drummer" by James Brown
- "The Don" contains elements from "Gimme Some More" by The J.B.'s, "The Mexican" by Babe Ruth, "It's Just Begun" by Jimmy Castor and "Gangster Boogie" by Chicago Gangsters
- "Pump Your Fist" contains elements from "Soul Makossa" by Manu Dibango
- "Let's Go" contains elements from "Think (About It)" by Lyn Collins, "Thriller" by Michael Jackson, "Jack the Ripper" and "I Can't Live Without My Radio" by LL Cool J

== Personnel ==
- Mohandes Dewese - vocals, producer
- LaVaba Mallison - mixing, producer
- Edward Theodore Riley - producer
- Peter Brian Harris - producer
- Chris Trevett - engineering
- Josh Chervokas - engineering
- George Karras - mixing
- Kafi Tuda - grooming
- Pietro Alfieri - artwork
- Doug Rowell - photography
- Ralph Wernli - photography

== Charts ==
=== Weekly charts ===
Chart (1989)	Peak position
US Billboard 200	25
US Top R&B/Hip-Hop Albums (Billboard)	1

=== Year-end charts ===
Chart (1989)	Position
US Top R&B/Hip-Hop Albums (Billboard)	29

=== Singles ===
Year	Song	Peak positions		
Year	Song	US Billboard Hot R&B/Hip-Hop Songs	US Billboard Hot Rap Songs	UK Singles Chart
1988	"Let's Go"	11	—	—
1989	"All Night Long"	70	—	—
1989	"I Go to Work"	13	5	—
1989	"They Want Money"	3	2	91

== Certifications ==
Region	Certification	Certified units/sales
United States (RIAA)	Gold	500,000^{^}
^{^} Shipments figures based on certification alone.
