= Kool Moe Dee (album) =

Studio album by Kool Moe Dee
- Released: October 1, 1986
- Genre: Hip hop
- Length: 45:13
- Label: Jive/RCA
- Producers: Kool Moe Dee; Teddy Riley; Bryan "Chuck" New; LaVaba Mallison; Pete Q. Harris; Robert Wells

Kool Moe Dee chronology
Kool Moe Dee (1986)	How Ya Like Me Now (1987)

Professional ratings
Review scores
Source	Rating
AllMusic	3.5/5 stars
Robert Christgau	A−

Kool Moe Dee is the debut solo album by the American rapper Kool Moe Dee from the Treacherous Three. It was released in 1986 on Jive Records and produced by Teddy Riley, Bryan "Chuck" New, LaVaba Mallison, Pete Q. Harris, Robert Wells and Kool Moe Dee.

The album peaked at number 83 on the Billboard 200, number 20 on the Top R&B/Hip-Hop Albums and sold over 300,000 copies. The record spawned four singles: "Go See the Doctor", "Rock Steady", "Dumb Dick (Richard)" and "Do You Know What Time It Is?", with only the first reaching music charts, peaking at number 89 on the Billboard Hot 100 and number 82 on the UK Singles Chart. Kool Moe Dee was released on compact disc in 1989.

== Track listing ==
All lyrics are written by Moe Dewese.

No.	Title	Length
1.	"Go See the Doctor"	5:33
2.	"Dumb Dick (Richard)"	4:27
3.	"Bad Mutha"	5:35
4.	"Little Jon"	4:42
5.	"Do You Know What Time it Is?"	4:17
6.	"Rock Steady"	4:16
7.	"Monster Crack"	6:01
8.	"The Best"	5:25
9.	"I'm Kool Moe Dee"	5:09
10.	"Go See the Doctor" (Uncensored version)	3:59
Total length:		49:24

== Personnel ==
- Mohandes Dewese – vocals, producer
- Edward Theodore Riley – producer
- Bryan Chuck New – producer
- LaVaba Mallison – producer
- Peter Brian Harris – producer
- Robert Wells – producer
- Doug Rowell – photography
- Kofi Tuda – grooming
- Tom Coyne—lacquer cutting and mastering engineer

== Charts ==
Album

Chart (1987)	Peak position
US Billboard Top R&B/Hip-Hop Albums	20
US Billboard 200	83

Singles

Year	Song	Peak positions	
Year	Song	US Billboard Hot 100	UK Singles Chart
1986	"Go See the Doctor"	89	82
1987	"Rock Steady"	—	—
1987	"Dumb Dick (Richard)"	—	—
1987	"Do You Know What Time It Is? / I'm Kool Moe Dee"	—	—
