= Treacherous Three =

Pioneering hip hop group

- Also known as: T3
- Origin: Manhattan, New York City, U.S.
- Genre: Hip hop
- Years active: 1978–1985; 1993–1994
- Labels: Sugar Hill; MCA; Enjoy; Sequel; CBS
- Past members: Special K LA Sunshine; Kool Moe Dee; DJ Easy Lee

The Treacherous Three was a pioneering American hip hop group that was formed in 1978 and consisted of DJ Easy Lee, Kool Moe Dee, L.A. Sunshine, Special K and Spoonie Gee (who left in the late 1970s), with occasional contributions from DJ Dano B, DJ Reggie Reg and DJ Crazy Eddie. They first appeared on record in 1980 on the B-side of Spoonie Gee's single "Love Rap".

== History ==
=== Origin ===
Kool Moe Dee and L.A Sunshine (Lamar Hill) grew up in the same neighborhood and they met DJ Easy Lee (Theodore Moy'e) in elementary school. Kool Moe Dee and Easy Lee both went to Norman Thomas high school where they met Special K (Kevin Keaton). DJ Easy Lee met Spoonie G through playing basketball and through his sister who knew Spoonie G. When Spoonie G left the group, Kool Moe Dee replaced him with Special K. Although he technically had left the group, Spoonie G was still affiliated. Spoonie G released a single called "Spoonin Rap" with the record label Sound of New York. After his relationship broke down with the label, he got a deal with Enjoy which was owned by his uncle, Bobby Robinson. He managed to persuade his uncle to let the Treacherous Three do a song on the B-side of his first single with Enjoy, which was called "Love Rap" and the B-side was the song "New Rap Language", which was released in 1980. "New Rap Language" was popular and made the group notable for the fast rapping style they used (double time rapping), which would be what they were originally known for. After this, Enjoy gave the group a single deal.

=== First releases ===
Also in 1980, they released "Body Rock," which was one of the first hip-hop songs to be influenced by rock music. They also released "At the Party", "Put the Boogie In Your Body" and "Feel the Heartbeat" (1981), the latter of which was popular at the time.

=== Sugarhill Records ===
In 1981, they moved to Sugar Hill Records. Their first single at Sugarhill was "Whip It", which featured singer Philippé Wynne, formerly of The Spinners. That single sampled the Dazz Band 1982 hit "Let It Whip". They then released the song "Yes We Can-Can", which followed on from the political trend that was set by the Grandmaster Flash and the Furious Five's single "The Message". In 1983, they released "Action", "Turning You On" and "Get Up". In 1984, they released, "Xmas Rap" and "Santa's Rap". By 1985 the group was being overshadowed by newer, more advanced groups such as Run-D.M.C. and L.A Sunshine was getting increasingly frustrated with their financial situation at Sugarhill, and eventually became disillusioned with making records. During this time many of the groups signed to Sugarhill Records were put on suspension, and Special K and L.A Sunshine did not want to make any more records for Sylvia Robinson (the co-owner of Sugarhill). Kool Moe Dee was the only MC in the group that was still actively working for Sugarhill, writing for the Sugarhill Gang. In 1985, Kool Moe Dee managed to persuade Special K and L.A Sunshine to go back into the studio to record "Gotta Rock". When it came to recording the B-side to "Gotta Rock", "Turn it Up" L.A Sunshine did not turn up to the recording session and Special K did not stay for the full session. Kool Moe Dee felt that Special K's rhymes were not up to his usual standards and therefore left them out. This would lead to the rise to Kool Moe Dee's solo career and the breakup of the group.

== Film career ==
The Group also had a short lived film career. Kool Moe Dee and L.A Sunshine had a brief cameo appearance in the movie Wildstyle, at the end of the film they are seen performing. Kool Moe Dee can also be seen briefly during the film as well. In 1984, they appeared in the film Beat Street, where they performed their song "Santa's Rap" along with a young Doug E. Fresh. Kool Moe Dee later went on to appear in numerous films and television programmes after the group split up. Kool Moe Dee released rap single "Wild Wild West" in 1988.

== Reunion ==
In 1993, the group resurfaced to do a reunion album on Easy Lee's record label, Wrap Records. The album, Old School Flava was released in 1994. The first single released was "Feel the New Heartbeat" which was a remix of the original record "Feel the Heartbeat", the new version included Doug E. Fresh. DJ Easy Lee expressed the view that one of the reasons that the album was not as well received as they thought it would be, was because the new version of "Feel the Heartbeat" was almost exactly the same, and that they should have released the posse cut "We Wit It" which featured Big Daddy Kane, Chuck D, Grandmaster Caz, Heavy D, Melle Mel, and Tito (of The Fearless Four); this song was a lot more popular but was never released as a single. In 1999, the group released Turn It Up which featured previously released records and was their unofficial greatest hits album. Since then the group has not released any new material.

== Legacy ==
The Treacherous Three are remembered as the originators of fast rapping, directly influencing MCs such as T La Rock, LL Cool J, and Rakim. They are also known as the first MC's to represent lyrical rap. They were also the first MCs to perform in Brazil, Holland, and Bermuda and were among the first MC's to travel to approximately 14 other countries.

Kool Moe Dee began a successful solo career in 1986 and is known for such classic hits as "Wild Wild West", Go See the Doctor, "God Made Me Funke", "I Go to Work" and "How Ya Like Me Now". Moe Dee also became known for his long-standing rivalry with LL Cool J. Special K put out his own solo single in 1987. L.A. went on to choreograph all of Kool Moe Dee's videos just as he did with all of the Treacherous Three's shows. DJ Easy Lee moved on to producing music and took a job as National Director of Promotions at Ichiban Records.

== Discography ==
=== Studio albums ===
Title	Album details
The Treacherous Three	Released: 1984; Label: Sugar Hill/MCA; Formats: CD, LP, cassette
Old School Flava	Released: February 21, 1994; Label: Wrap Records; Formats: CD, LP, cassette

=== Live albums ===
Title	Album details
Live Convention '81	Released: 1981; Label: Tuff City; Formats: LP

=== Compilation albums ===
Title	Album details
Whip It	Released: 1983; Label: Sugar Hill; Formats: LP
Turn It Up	Released: July 11, 2000; Label: Sequel; Formats: CD

=== Singles ===
List of singles, showing year released and album name
Title	Year	Album
"The New Rap Language" (with Spoonie G)	1980	Non-album single
"The Body Rock"	1980	The Treacherous Three
"At the Party"	1980	The Treacherous Three
"Put the Boogie in Your Body"	1981	Non-album single
"Feel the Heartbeat"	1981	The Treacherous Three
"Whip It"	1982	Whip It
"Yes We Can-Can"	1982	Whip It
"Action"	1983	Whip It
"Turning You On"	1983	The Treacherous Three
"Get Up"	1983	The Treacherous Three
"Santa's Rap"	1984	Beat Street OST
"Xmas Rap"	1984	Non-album single
"Breath"	1984	Non-album single
"Gotta Rock"	1985	Non-album single
"We Come Phat"	1994	Old School Flava
"Feel the New Heartbeat"	1994	Old School Flava
