= Funke, Funke Wisdom =

Studio album by Kool Moe Dee
- Released: June 11, 1991
- Studios: Battery Studios (New York, NY); M'Bila Recording Studios (Hollywood, CA)>; Unique Recording Studios (New York, NY)
- Genre: Hip-hop
- Length: 54:24
- Labels: Jive; RCA
- Producers: Kool Moe Dee; Teddy Riley; Dale Hogan; Keith Spencer

Kool Moe Dee chronology
Knowledge Is King (1989)	Funke, Funke Wisdom (1991)	Interlude (1994)

Professional ratings
Review scores
Source	Rating
AllMusic	2.5/5 stars
Robert Christgau	(3-star Honorable Mention)
Entertainment Weekly	B+
The Rolling Stone Album Guide	3/5 stars

Funke, Funke Wisdom is the fourth solo album by the American recording artist Kool Moe Dee. It was released in 1991 via Jive Records, making it the rapper's final album on the label.

== Background ==
Production of the record was handled by Teddy Riley, Dale Hogan, Keith Spencer and Kool Moe Dee. The album peaked at #72 on the Billboard 200 and #19 on Top R&B/Hip-Hop Albums. It spawned three singles: "How Kool Can One Black Man Be", "Death Blow" and "Rise 'N' Shine".

"Rise 'N' Shine" featuring KRS-One & Chuck D became the most successful single, reaching number 1 on the Hot Rap Songs chart. "How Kool Can One Black Man Be" peaked at number 9 on Hot Rap Songs and number 49 on Hot R&B/Hip-Hop Songs. The track "Death Blow", a diss track directed at LL Cool J, did not chart, and the music video satirized LL Cool J's "Mama Said Knock You Out" video.

== Track listing ==
No.	Title	Writer(s)	Producer(s)	Length
1.	"Intro"	M. Dewese; T. Riley	Kool Moe Dee	1:01
2.	"Funke Wisdom"	M. Dewese	Teddy Riley	3:28
3.	"Here We Go Again"	M. Dewese	Kool Moe Dee	3:46
4.	"To the Beat Y'all"	M. Dewese; T. Riley	Kool Moe Dee; Teddy Riley	3:21
5.	"How Kool Can One Blackman Be"	M. Dewese	Teddy Riley	4:58
6.	"Bad, Bad, Bad"	M. Dewese	Kool Moe Dee	4:47
7.	"Rise 'N' Shine" (featuring KRS-One & Chuck D)	M. Dewese; C. Ridenhour; L. Parker	Kool Moe Dee	4:38
8.	"Mo' Better"	M. Dewese; T. Riley	Kool Moe Dee	0:58
9.	"I Like it Nasty"	M. Dewese	Kool Moe Dee	4:46
10.	"Death Blow"	M. Dewese	Teddy Riley	6:37
11.	"Let's Get Serious"	M. Dewese	Kool Moe Dee	3:54
12.	"Poetic Justice"	M. Dewese	Dale Hogan; Keith Spencer	3:50
13.	"Gangsta Boogie"	M. Dewese	Dale Hogan; Keith Spencer	4:12
14.	"Time's Up"	M. Dewese	Kool Moe Dee	4:07
Total length:				54:24

Sample credits

- Track 2 contains elements from "Make It Funky" and "Hot Pants" by James Brown (1971)
- Track 3 contains elements from "Escape-ism" by James Brown (1971), "Bring the Noise" by Public Enemy (1987) and "Atomic Dog" by George Clinton (1982)
- Track 4 contains elements from "Mind Power" by James Brown (1973)
- Track 5 contains elements from "Papa Don't Take No Mess" by James Brown (1974)
- Track 6 contains elements from "Funky Drummer" by James Brown (1970)
- Track 7 contains elements from "Outa-Space" by Billy Preston (1971) and "Stand!" by Sly & the Family Stone (1969)
- Track 9 contains elements from "Bigger's Theme" by Mtume (1986)
- Track 10 contains elements from "Get on the Good Foot" by James Brown (1972), "Escape-ism" by James Brown (1971), "Rock the Bells" by LL Cool J (1985), "Let's Go" by Kool Moe Dee (1987), "To Da Break of Dawn" and "Mama Said Knock You Out" by LL Cool J (1990), "Change the Beat (Female Version)" by Beside (1982) and "It Gets No Rougher" by LL Cool J (1989)
- Track 11 contains elements from "Soul Power" by James Brown (1971), "Blow Your Head" by Fred Wesley & The J.B.'s (1974) and "Poison" by Bell Biv DeVoe (1990)
- Track 12 contains elements from "Spirit of the Boogie" by Kool & the Gang (1975) and "Introduction to the J.B.'s" by Fred Wesley & The J.B.'s (1973)
- Track 13 contains elements from "Gangster Boogie" by Chicago Gangsters (1975) and "Get on the Good Foot" by James Brown (1972)
- Track 14 contains elements from "Funky Worm" by Ohio Players (1972), "I Know You Got Soul" by Eric B. & Rakim (1987), "Think (About It)" by Lyn Collins (1972) and "It Takes Two" by Rob Base & DJ E-Z Rock (1988)

== Personnel ==
- Mohandes Dewese – vocals, producer
- Carlton Douglas Ridenhour – vocals (track 7)
- Lawrence Parker – vocals (track 7)
- Steve Arrington – backing vocals (tracks: 6, 11)
- Mirage Mixeau – backing vocals (tracks: 11, 12)
- Edward Theodore Riley – producer
- Keith Spencer – producer
- Dale Hogan – producer
- Barbera Aimes – engineer/mixing
- Anthony Saunders – assistant engineer/mixing
- Dave Way – engineer
- Jason Chervokas – engineer
- Josh Chervokas – engineer
- Al Singleton – assistant engineer
- Ben Garrison – assistant engineer
- Charlie Allen – assistant engineer
- Dave Hecht – assistant engineer
- Eric Lynch – assistant engineer
- Scott Weatherspoon – assistant engineer
- Tom Coyne – mastering
- Sally Boon – photography

== Charts ==
Album

Chart (1991)	Peak position
US Billboard 200	72
US Billboard Top R&B Albums	19

Singles

Year	Song	Peak positions	
Year	Song	US R&B	US Rap
1990	"How Kool Can One Black Man Be"	49	9
1991	"Death Blow"	—	—
1991	"Rise 'N' Shine"	—	1
