= Enjoy Records =

American record label

Enjoy Records was a record label owned and operated by Bobby Robinson from 1962 through the mid-1980s, and was run out of his record shop at 125th Street and 8th Ave. in Harlem. Starting with blues, R&B, and rock and roll, the label recorded many of the original old-school hip hop groups and MCs, including Grandmaster Flash and the Furious Five, the Funky 4+1, Spoonie Gee, and the Treacherous Three, beginning in 1979. The label closed down in 1987, although Robinson's shop remained open.

== See also ==
- Everloving Records, a record label that was known as Enjoy Records from 2000-2003.
- The Best of Enjoy! Records, a compilation of hip hop music released by the label
- List of record labels
