= The Fearless Four (group) =

American hip hop group

Fearless Four
- Origin: Manhattan, New York City, U.S.
- Genres: Hip hop; old-school hip hop
- Years active: 1977–1994
- Labels: Enjoy; Elektra; Tuff City; Mercury
- Past members: Microphone Wizard DLB; Mighty Mike C Devastating Tito; The Great Peso; Krazy Eddie; Master OC

The Fearless Four (also known as Fearless 4 and Fearless Four) is an American old school hip hop group from Harlem, New York. The group is best known for its 1982 single "Rockin' It", which was based on the Kraftwerk track "The Man-Machine", and was featured in the 1983 documentary Style Wars. Originally, the Fearless Four was a two-member group called the Houserockers Crew. Later, it reappeared as a six-member group consisting of four frontmen The Great Peso, Devastating Tito, Mighty Mike C, Microphone Wizard DLB, with two DJs Krazy Eddie & Master OC.

In 1983, the group collaborated with rapper Kurtis Blow to produce the single "Problems of the World." It was the first crew to be signed to a major label, Elektra Records. The group only released one studio album, Creepin' up on Ya, which was released in 1994.

== Discography ==
=== Albums ===
- Creepin' up on Ya (1994)

=== Singles ===
- "Rockin' It" (1982)
- "It's Magic" (1982)
- "Something New" (1983)
- "Problems Of The World" (1983)
- "Fearless Freestyle". (1983)
- "F4000 (1983)
- "Just Rock" / "Got To Turn Out" (1983)
- "Dedication" (1984)
- "After Tonight" (1987)
- "Creepin' up on Ya" (1994)
