= Go See the Doctor =

Single by Kool Moe Dee

from the album Kool Moe Dee
- B-side: "Monster Crack"
- Released: 1986
- Recorded: 1986
- Genre: Golden age hip hop
- Length: 3:57
- Label: Rooftop (original); Jive (reissue)
- Songwriter: Mohandas Dewese
- Producers: Kool Moe Dee; Teddy Riley; LaVaba Mallison

Kool Moe Dee singles chronology
"Turn It Up" (1985)	"Go See the Doctor" (1986)	"Rock Steady" (1987)

"Go See the Doctor" is a song by American rapper Kool Moe Dee. It was released in 1986 as the first single from his eponymous debut album. Originally released by Rooftop, it was later reissued by Jive. Produced by Kool Moe Dee himself with Lavaba and Teddy Riley, the song has messages of the prevention of sexually transmitted infections.

"Go See the Doctor" became Kool Moe Dee's first single to appear on the Billboard Hot 100, peaking at number 89 in April 1987 and staying on the chart for five weeks. It also peaked at number seven on the Belgian Ultratop (Flanders), number three on the Dutch Nationale Hitparade and number 82 on the UK Singles Chart, being his single with the highest impact outside the United States. Bruce Pollock listed the song in his book Rock Song Index: The 7500 Most Important Songs for the Rock and Roll Era (2005)

== Conception and composition ==
During an interview in June 1987, Kool Moe Dee commented on "Go See the Doctor":

As an artist I have the attention of a lot of the younger kids. It’s a duty to say something worthwhile, rather than just get up and talk about sneakers and dancing all the time. Rap is an album market now rather than just a singles market, so you have the opportunity to branch out a little. You can expand and really talk about more things in depth, including lots of social issues."

The song, which Los Angeles Times described as "a story, in explicit language, of the contraction and consequences of a sexually transmitted disease", aroused controversy in the United States, but was used in a public service announcement in Germany.

In a later interview Kool Moe Dee stated that "Go See the Doctor" was "the hardest thing I had to do in my career":

I knew I was making a formula record, and I was about to make a killing; but I will lose all my reputation on the lyricist side. I knew that "Go See the Doctor" would blow because I had dumbed it down."

Among the song's producers was Teddy Riley, who at that time was 18 years old and had previously worked on the Doug E. Fresh hit "The Show".

=== Samples ===
The song contains a sample of James Brown's "Funky Drummer" (In an interview with Vibe in 2012, Teddy Riley declared about this time that "Between me and Marley Marl, we were the first to sample James Brown"). The song also interpolates Hank Williams's "Hey, Good Lookin'".

== Legacy and influence ==
Hip-hop magazine Ego Trip included "Go See the Doctor" on in its list of the Greatest Hip-Hop Singles of 1986.

Bruce Pollock listed the song in his book Rock Song Index: The 7500 Most Important Songs for the Rock and Roll Era (2005) for "instructive editorial in the era of AIDS".

=== Appearances ===
- In 1987, it was sampled in "8 Ball" by N.W.A from their debut compilation album N.W.A. and the Posse.
- In 1988, "Go See the Doctor" was sampled by Eazy-E on his single "Eazy-Duz-It" from the album of the same name.
- In 1989, it was sampled by The D.O.C. on his single "Mind Blowin'" from his album No One Can Do It Better.
- In 1991, it was sampled in "Look Who's Burnin" by Ice Cube from his album Death Certificate.
- In 1993, De La Soul referenced the song in "3 Days Later" from their album Buhloone Mindstate, in which Posdnuos sings "I had to go see the doctor".
- In 1993, Kid Rock sampled the line "Ain't nobody stickin' nothing in my butt" in his song "Balls in Your Mouth" from the album The Polyfuze Method.
- In 1994, "Go See the Doctor" has sampled in "I Shoulda Used A Rubba" by Big L from the early versions of his debut album Lifestylez ov da Poor & Dangerous.
- In 1996, it was sampled in "Waiting List" by Kool Keith (under the alias Dr. Octagon) from his debut album Dr. Octagonecologyst.
- In 2007, it was sampled in "Go See the Doctor 2k7" by DJ Jazzy Jeff in collaboration with Twone Gabz from his album The Return of the Magnificent.

== Track listing ==
A-side

1. "Go See the Doctor" (Almost Clean) (Radio Version) (3:57)
2. "Go See the Doctor" (Uncensored) (3:57)

B-side

1. "Monster Crack" (Street Mix) (5:27)
2. "Monster Crack (Radio Edit) (3:50)

== Charts ==
=== Weekly charts ===
Chart (1987)	Peak position
Belgium (Ultratop 50 Flanders)	7
Netherlands (Dutch Top 40)	6
Netherlands (Single Top 100)	3
UK Singles (Official Charts)	82
US Billboard Hot 100	89

=== Year-end charts ===
Chart (1987)	Position
Netherlands (Dutch Top 40)	74
Netherlands (Single Top 100)	55
