= Wild Wild West (Kool Moe Dee song) =

Single by Kool Moe Dee

from the album How Ya Like Me Now
- B-side: "Suckers"
- Released: 1988
- Recorded: 1987
- Studio: Battery Studios (London, UK)
- Genre: Hip hop
- Length: 4:10
- Label: Jive; RCA
- Songwriter(s): Mohandas Dewese
- Producer(s): Kool Moe Dee; Bryan "Chuck" New; LaVaba Mallison; Pete Q. Harris; Teddy Riley

Kool Moe Dee singles chronology
| "How Ya Like Me Now" (1987) | "Wild Wild West" (1988) | "No Respect" (1987) |

"Wild Wild West" is a song by American rapper Kool Moe Dee, released in 1988 as a second single from his second studio album How Ya Like Me Now. It was recorded in 1987 at Battery Studios in London, England, produced by Bryan "Chuck" New, LaVaba Mallison, Pete Q. Harris, Teddy Riley and Kool Moe Dee, and released via Jive Records.

In the United States, the single peaked at number 62 on the Billboard Hot 100 and number 4 on the Billboard Hot R&B/Hip-Hop Songs chart. It was later sampled by Will Smith in his 1999 song of the same name, featuring Kool Moe Dee (along with Dru Hill). It was rerecorded for the soundtrack to the film Wild Wild West.

== Music video ==
The music video features Kool Moe Dee in a western style town with snow on the ground and with back up dancers. The video was filmed at Wild West City, in Stanhope, NJ.

== Track listing ==
7", vinyl
| No. | Title | Writer(s) | Producer(s) | Length |
|---|---|---|---|---|
| 1. | "Wild, Wild West" (Single Edit) | M. Dewese | Bryan "Chuck" New; LaVaba Mallison; Kool Moe Dee; Pete Q. Harris; Teddy Riley | 4:10 |
| 2. | "Wild, Wild West" (Instrumental) | M. Dewese | Bryan "Chuck" New; LaVaba Mallison; Kool Moe Dee; Pete Q. Harris; Teddy Riley | 5:00 |

12", Maxi
| No. | Title | Writer(s) | Producer(s) | Length |
|---|---|---|---|---|
| 1. | "Wild, Wild West" (Special Extended Re-mix) | M. Dewese | Bryan "Chuck" New; Kool Moe Dee; LaVaba Mallison; Pete Q. Harris; Teddy Riley | 5:32 |
| 2. | "Wild, Wild West" (Single Edit) | M. Dewese | Bryan "Chuck" New; Kool Moe Dee; LaVaba Mallison; Pete Q. Harris; Teddy Riley | 4:10 |
| 3. | "Wild, Wild West" (Instrumental) | M. Dewese | Bryan "Chuck" New; Kool Moe Dee; LaVaba Mallison; Pete Q. Harris; Teddy Riley | 5:00 |
| 4. | "Suckers" | M. Dewese | Bryan "Chuck" New; Kool Moe Dee; LaVaba Mallison; Pete Q. Harris; Teddy Riley | 4:42 |

== Personnel ==
- Mohandas Dewese - songwriter, performer, producer
- Bryan "Chuck" New - mixing, engineer, producer
- Edward Theodore Riley - producer
- Peter Brian Harris - producer
- LaVaba Edourd Vonzell Mallison - producer

== Charts ==
| Chart (1988) | Peak position |
|---|---|
| US Billboard Hot 100 | 62 |
| US Billboard Hot R&B Singles | 4 |
