= Will Smith filmography =

Performances by American actor

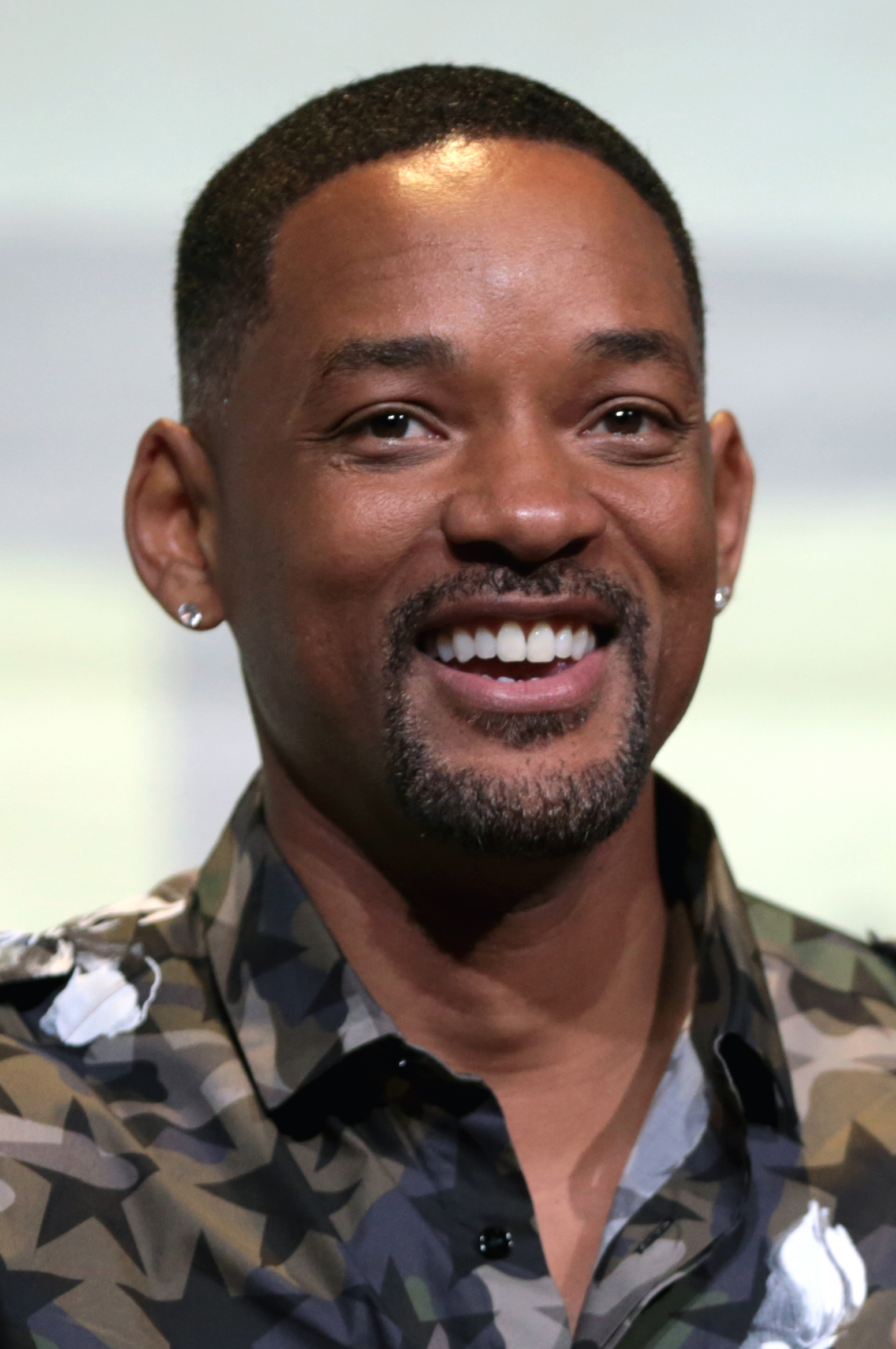
Smith at the 2016 San Diego Comic-Con

Will Smith is an American actor, rapper, and film producer. His breakthrough came when he played a fictionalized version of himself in the 1990s television sitcom The Fresh Prince of Bel-Air. The role brought him international recognition and two Golden Globe Award nominations for Best Actor – Television Series Musical or Comedy. He also served as an executive producer on 24 episodes of the series. Two years later, Smith made his film debut in the drama Where the Day Takes You, where he appeared as a disabled homeless man. In 1995, he starred as a police officer with Martin Lawrence in Michael Bay's Bad Boys. The following year, Smith appeared as a Marine Corps pilot with Jeff Goldblum in Roland Emmerich's science fiction film Independence Day. The film grossed over $817 million at the worldwide box office and was the highest grossing of 1996. In 1997, he starred as Agent J in the science fiction film Men in Black, a role he reprised in its sequels Men in Black II (2002) and Men in Black 3 (2012).

Smith portrayed heavyweight boxer Muhammad Ali in the 2001 biopic Ali. For his performance he was nominated for the Academy Award for Best Actor and the Golden Globe Award for Best Actor – Motion Picture Drama. In 2004, he appeared in the animated film Shark Tale, and science fiction film I, Robot. The following year he starred as a professional dating consultant in the romantic comedy Hitch. Smith's portrayal of entrepreneur and salesman Chris Gardner in the biopic The Pursuit of Happyness (2006) received Academy Award and Golden Globe Award nominations for Best Actor. In 2008, he played a vigilante superhero in Hancock. While the film received mixed to negative reviews, it became his eighth consecutive to gross over $100 million at the North American box office and grossed a worldwide total of over $624 million. (Note: The streak started with Men in Black II in 2002.) In 2015, Smith portrayed Nigerian-American physician Bennet Omalu in the biopic Concussion for which he garnered a nomination for a Golden Globe Award. The following year, he appeared in the action film Suicide Squad, which grossed over $745 million at the worldwide box office. In 2019, Smith starred as the Genie in the live-action adaptation of the 1992 animation film of the same name, Aladdin. The film is his highest grossing, with a worldwide box office total of over $1 billion. In 2022, Smith won the Academy Award for Best Actor for his performance as tennis coach Richard Williams in King Richard.

== Film ==
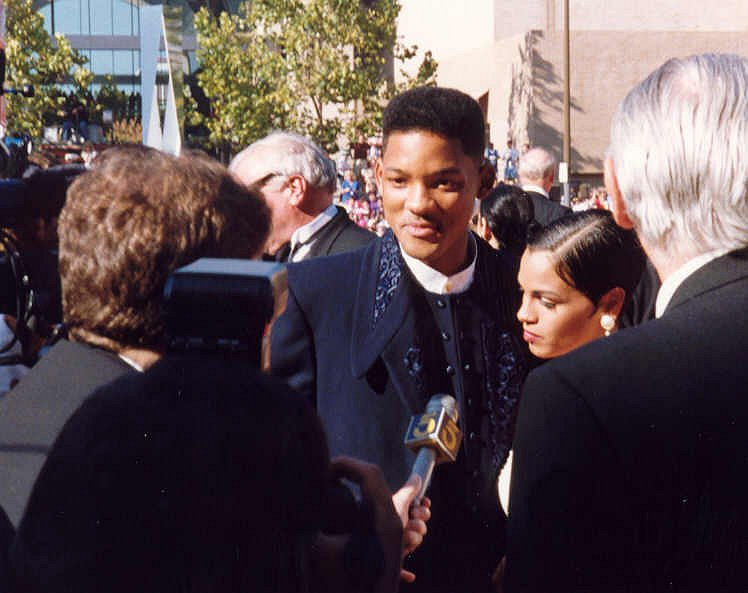
Smith at the 45th Primetime Emmy Awards in 1993

| Year | Title | Functioned as | | | Notes | Ref(s) |
| Year | Title | Actor | Producer | Role | Notes | Ref(s) |
|---|---|---|---|---|---|---|
| 1992 | Where the Day Takes You | Yes | No | Manny | | |
| 1993 | Made in America | Yes | No | Tea Cake Walters | | |
| 1993 | Six Degrees of Separation | Yes | No | Paul | | |
| 1995 | Bad Boys | Yes | No | Mike Lowrey | | |
| 1996 | Independence Day | Yes | No | Capt. Steven Hiller | | |
| 1997 | Men in Black | Yes | No | James Edwards / Agent J | | |
| 1998 | Welcome to Hollywood | Yes | No | Himself | Cameo | |
| 1998 | Enemy of the State | Yes | No | Robert Clayton Dean | | |
| 1999 | Wild Wild West | Yes | No | Captain James West | | |
| 2000 | The Legend of Bagger Vance | Yes | No | Bagger Vance | | |
| 2001 | Ali | Yes | No | Muhammad Ali | | |
| 2002 | Men in Black II | Yes | No | James Edwards / Agent J | | |
| 2003 | Bad Boys II | Yes | No | Mike Lowrey | | |
| 2004 | Jersey Girl | Yes | No | Himself | Cameo | |
| 2004 | I, Robot | Yes | Executive | Detective Del Spooner | | |
| 2004 | Saving Face | No | Yes | —N/a | | |
| 2004 | Shark Tale | Yes | No | Oscar (voice) | | |
| 2005 | Hitch | Yes | Yes | Alex "Hitch" Hitchens | | |
| 2006 | ATL | No | Yes | —N/a | | |
| 2006 | The Pursuit of Happyness | Yes | Yes | Chris Gardner | | |
| 2007 | I Am Legend | Yes | No | Robert Neville | | |
| 2008 | Hancock | Yes | Yes | John Hancock | | |
| 2008 | The Human Contract | No | Executive | —N/a | | |
| 2008 | The Secret Life of Bees | No | Yes | —N/a | | |
| 2008 | Lakeview Terrace | No | Yes | —N/a | | |
| 2008 | Seven Pounds | Yes | Yes | Tim Thomas | | |
| 2010 | The Karate Kid | No | Yes | —N/a | | |
| 2012 | This Means War | No | Yes | —N/a | | |
| 2012 | Men in Black 3 | Yes | No | James Edwards / Agent J | | |
| 2013 | After Earth | Yes | Yes | Cypher Raige | Also writer | |
| 2013 | Anchorman 2: The Legend Continues | Yes | No | ESPN Reporter | Cameo | |
| 2014 | Winter's Tale | Yes | No | Lucifer | Cameo | |
| 2014 | Annie | No | Yes | —N/a | | |
| 2015 | Focus | Yes | No | Nicky Spurgeon | | |
| 2015 | Concussion | Yes | No | Bennet Omalu | | |
| 2016 | Suicide Squad | Yes | No | Floyd Lawton / Deadshot | | |
| 2016 | Collateral Beauty | Yes | No | Howard Inlet | | |
| 2017 | Bright | Yes | No | Daryl Ward | | |
| 2019 | Student of the Year 2 | Yes | No | Himself | Cameo; Hindi film | |
| 2019 | Aladdin | Yes | No | Genie / Mariner | | |
| 2019 | Dads | Yes | No | Himself | Documentary | |
| 2019 | Gemini Man | Yes | No | Henry Brogan and Junior (Note: Will Smith played double role films.) | | |
| 2019 | Spies in Disguise | Yes | No | Lance Sterling (voice) | | |
| 2020 | Bad Boys for Life | Yes | Yes | Mike Lowrey | | |
| 2020 | Life in a Year | No | Executive | —N/a | | |
| 2021 | King Richard | Yes | Yes | Richard Williams | | |
| 2022 | Emancipation | Yes | Yes | Peter | | |
| 2024 | Bad Boys: Ride or Die | Yes | Yes | Mike Lowrey | | |
| 2027 | Supermax † | Yes | Yes | Rex | Filming | |

== Television ==
| Year(s) | Title | Role | Notes | Ref(s) |
|---|---|---|---|---|
| 1990 | ABC Afterschool Special | Hawker | Episode: "The Perfect Date" (Cameo) | |
| 1990 | The Earth Day Special | Himself | | |
| 1990 | Rockin' Through the Decades | Host | Documentary of Alvin and the Chipmunks | |
| 1990–1996 | The Fresh Prince of Bel-Air | Will Smith | Lead role; Executive producer (24 episodes); Story writer (episode: "Ain't No Business Like Show Business") | |
| 1991 | Blossom | Himself | Episode: "I'm with the Band" (Cameo) | |
| 1997 | Happily Ever After: Fairy Tales for Every Child | Pinocchio (voice) | Episode: "Pinocchio" | |
| 2003–2007 | All of Us | Jonny | Executive producer and co-creator; Actor (3 episodes); Writer (2 episodes); Director (episode: ''The N-Word'') | |
| 2005 | BET Awards 2005 | Host | | |
| 2009 | Un-broke: What You Need to Know About Money | Himself | | |
| 2012 | 2012 Kids' Choice Awards | Host | | |
| 2013 | The Queen Latifah Show | —N/a | Producer | |
| 2018 | One Strange Rock | Host | Documentary series | |
| 2018–2025 | Cobra Kai | —N/a | Executive producer | |
| 2019 | Will Smith's Bucket List | Himself | Executive producer; Documentary series | |
| 2020 | Will Smith: Off the Deep End | Himself | Documentary | |
| 2021 | Amend: The Fight for America | Host | Documentary series | |
| 2021 | Best Shape of My Life | Himself | Executive producer; Documentary series | |
| 2021 | Welcome to Earth | Host | Documentary series | |
| 2022 | Women of the Movement | —N/a | Executive producer; Miniseries | |
| 2022–2025 | Bel-Air | Older Will Smith | Episode: "The Next Act"; also executive producer | |
| 2022 | This Joka | —N/a | Executive producer | |
| 2025 | Baller League | Himself | Guest | |
| 2026 | Pole to Pole | Himself | Executive producer | |

== Video game ==
| Year | Title | Role | Notes | Ref(s) |
|---|---|---|---|---|
| 2023 | Undawn | Trey Jones | Likeness | |

== See also ==
- List of awards and nominations received by Will Smith
