= Will Smith discography =

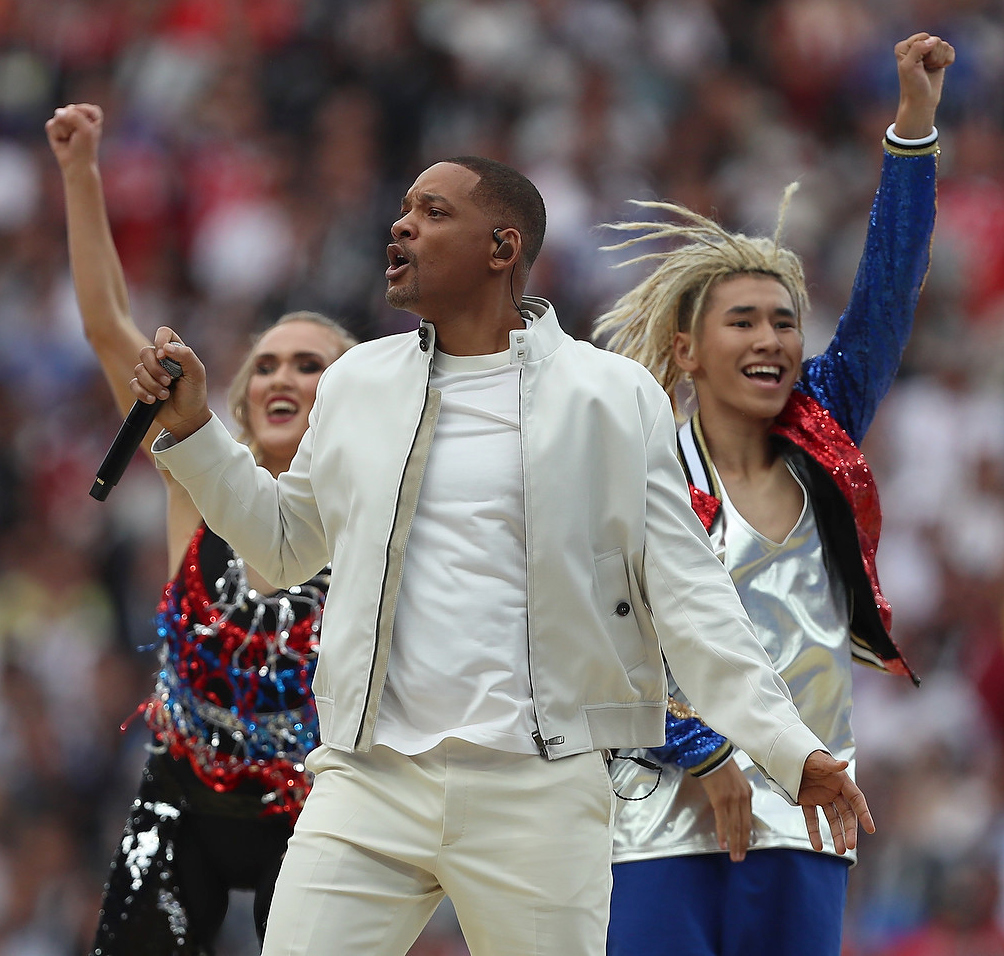
- Will Smith at the close of the 2018 FIFA World Cup
- Studio albums: 5
- Compilation albums: 1
- Singles: 18
- Video albums: 1
- Music videos: 20

American rapper Will Smith has released five studio albums, one compilation album, 18 singles (12 as lead artist and five as featured artist), one video album and 20 music videos (14 as lead artist, three as featured artist and three guest appearances). After working in the late 1980s and early 1990s with Jeff Townes as DJ Jazzy Jeff & The Fresh Prince, Smith began his solo career in 1997 with the release of "Men in Black", the theme song for the film of the same name, which topped singles charts in several regions across the world, including the UK. "Men in Black" (and second single "Just Cruisin'") was later included on Smith's debut solo album Big Willie Style, which reached the top ten of the US Billboard 200 and was certified nine times platinum by the Recording Industry Association of America (RIAA). The third single from the album, "Gettin' Jiggy wit It", became Smith's first Billboard Hot 100 number one when it was released in 1998.

Smith's second album was again supported by the release of a film theme song as the lead single: "Wild Wild West", featuring Dru Hill and Kool Moe Dee, topped the Billboard Hot 100 and was certified gold by the RIAA. The album in question, Willennium, reached number five on the Billboard 200 and was certified double platinum by the RIAA. "Will 2K", the second single from the album, reached number 25 on the Billboard Hot 100. Before the end of 1999, a video album was released featuring Smith's seven music videos released to date, which reached number 25 on the UK Music Video Chart. The same year, the rapper was also featured on The Fresh Prince of Bel-Air co-star Tatyana Ali's single "Boy You Knock Me Out", which reached number three on the UK Singles Chart and topped the UK R&B Singles Chart.

In 2002, Smith returned with his third album Born to Reign, which reached number 13 on the Billboard 200 and was certified gold by the RIAA. The album's lead single was Men in Black II theme song "Black Suits Comin' (Nod Ya Head)", which reached number three on the UK Singles Chart. Later in the year, Smith's first compilation album Greatest Hits was released, featuring songs from his three solo albums as well as those produced with DJ Jazzy Jeff. Smith's fourth studio album Lost and Found was released in 2005, peaking at number six on the Billboard 200. Lead single "Switch" reached the top ten of both the Billboard Hot 100 and the UK Singles Chart. Smith released his next single, "Get Lit", on October 6, 2017. His fifth album, Based on a True Story was released in 2025.

== Albums ==
=== Studio albums ===
List of studio albums, with selected chart positions, sales figures and certifications
| Title | Album details | Peak chart positions | | | | | | | | | | Sales | Certifications |
| Title | Album details | US | AUS | AUT | CAN | FRA | GER | NED | NZ | SWI | UK | Sales | Certifications |
|---|---|---|---|---|---|---|---|---|---|---|---|---|---|
| Big Willie Style | Released: November 25, 1997; Label: Columbia; Formats: CD, LP, CS | 8 | 26 | 9 | 14 | 5 | 20 | 9 | 17 | 21 | 9 | US: 7,290,000 | RIAA: 9× Platinum; BPI: 2× Platinum; MC: 6× Platinum; RMNZ: Platinum |
| Willennium | Released: November 16, 1999; Label: Columbia; Formats: CD, LP, CS | 5 | 27 | 28 | 6 | 20 | 20 | 26 | 28 | 16 | 10 | | RIAA: 2× Platinum; BPI: Platinum; MC: 2× Platinum |
| Born to Reign | Released: June 25, 2002; Label: Columbia; Formats: CD, LP, CS | 13 | 58 | 20 | 29 | 61 | 19 | — | 39 | 17 | 24 | | RIAA: Gold |
| Lost and Found | Released: March 29, 2005; Label: Interscope; Formats: CD, LP | 6 | 87 | 30 | 8 | 103 | 14 | 76 | — | 35 | 15 | | RIAA: Gold; BPI: Silver |
| Based on a True Story | Released: March 28, 2025; Label: Slang; Formats: Digital download, streaming | — | — | — | — | — | — | — | — | — | — (Note: Based on a True Story did not enter the UK Albums Chart, but peaked at number 79 on the UK Album Downloads Chart.) | | |
"—" denotes releases that did not chart or were not released in that territory.

=== Compilation albums ===
List of compilation albums, with selected chart positions, sales figures and certifications
| Title | Album details | Peak chart positions | | Certifications |
| Title | Album details | UK | UK R&B | Certifications |
|---|---|---|---|---|
| Greatest Hits | Released: November 26, 2002; Label: Columbia; Formats: CD, CS | 82 | 23 | BPI: Gold |

=== Video albums ===
List of video albums, with selected chart positions
| Title | Album details | Peak chart positions |
| Title | Album details | UK |
|---|---|---|
| The Will Smith Music Video Collection | Released: December 7, 1999; Label: Columbia; Format: DVD | 25 |

== Singles ==
=== As lead artist ===
List of singles as lead artist, with selected chart positions and certifications, showing year released and album name
| Title | Year | Peak chart positions | | | | | | | | | | Certifications | Album |
| Title | Year | US | AUS | AUT | BEL (WA) | GER | NED | NZ | SWE | SWI | UK | Certifications | Album |
|---|---|---|---|---|---|---|---|---|---|---|---|---|---|
| "Men in Black" | 1997 | — (Note: "Men in Black" did not enter the Billboard Hot 100 due to chart rules at the time making it ineligible, but peaked at number 1 on the Hot 100 Airplay chart, which measures radio airplay only without sales.) | 1 | 2 | 1 | 1 | 2 | 1 | 2 | 1 | 1 | ARIA: 2× Platinum; BPI: 2× Platinum; BVMI: 3× Gold; IFPI AUT: Gold; RMNZ: Platinum | Men in Black (soundtrack)/Big Willie Style |
| "Just Cruisin'" | 1997 | — | — | 37 | 32 | 27 | 45 | — | 7 | 32 | 23 | | Men in Black (soundtrack)/Big Willie Style |
| "Gettin' Jiggy wit It" | 1998 | 1 | 6 | 26 | 12 | 18 | 7 | 6 | 4 | 12 | 3 | ARIA: Platinum; BPI: Platinum; RIAA: Gold; RMNZ: Platinum | Big Willie Style |
| "Just the Two of Us" | 1998 | 20 | 27 | — | 40 | 81 | 46 | 6 | 53 | — | 2 | BPI: Silver; RMNZ: Gold | Big Willie Style |
| "Miami" | 1998 | 17 | 27 | 5 | 10 | 12 | 10 | 4 | 5 | 4 | 3 | BPI: 2× Platinum | Big Willie Style |
| "Wild Wild West" (featuring Dru Hill and Kool Moe Dee) | 1999 | 1 | 8 | 5 | 3 | 3 | 2 | 2 | 4 | 2 | 2 | ARIA: Gold; BPI: Gold; BVMI: Gold; RIAA: Gold; RMNZ: Gold | Wild Wild West (soundtrack) / Willennium |
| "Will 2K" (featuring K-Ci) | 1999 | 25 | 3 | — | 13 | 40 | 11 | 6 | 16 | 23 | 2 | ARIA: Gold; BPI: Silver; RMNZ: Gold | Willennium |
| "Freakin' It" | 2000 | 99 | 56 | — | 32 | 70 | 60 | — | — | 44 | 15 | | Willennium |
| "Black Suits Comin' (Nod Ya Head)" (featuring Trā-Knox) | 2002 | 77 | 18 | 7 | 17 | 4 | 53 | 30 | 10 | 5 | 3 | ARIA: Gold | Born to Reign |
| "1000 Kisses" (featuring Jada Pinkett Smith) | 2002 | — | — | — | — (Note: "1000 Kisses" peaked at number 4 on the Ultratip chart.) | 61 | — | — | — | 44 | — | | Born to Reign |
| "Switch" | 2005 | 7 | 1 | 7 | 14 | 4 | 3 | 3 | — | 13 | 4 | ARIA: Platinum; BPI: Gold; RIAA: Gold; RMNZ: Gold | Lost and Found |
| "Party Starter" | 2005 | — | 33 | 62 | — (Note: "Party Starter" peaked at number 5 on the Ultratip chart.) | 40 | 44 | 35 | — | 26 | 19 | | Lost and Found |
| "Get Lit" | 2017 | — | — | — | — | — | — | — | — | — | — | | Non-album single |
| "Light 'Em Up" (with Sean Paul) | 2024 | — | — | — | — | — | — | — | — | — | — | | Bad Boys: Ride or Die |
| "You Can Make It" (with Fridayy and Sunday Service Choir) | 2024 | — (Note: "You Can Make It" did not enter the Billboard Hot 100, but peaked at #23 on the Billboard Hot Christian Songs chart) | — | — | — | — | — | — | — | — | — | | Based on a True Story |
| "Work of Art" (with Russ featuring Jaden) | 2024 | — | — | — | — | — | — | — | — | — | — | | Based on a True Story |
| "Tantrum" (with Joyner Lucas) | 2024 | — | — | — | — | — | — | — | — | — | — | | Based on a True Story |
| "Beautiful Scars" (with Big Sean and Obanga) | 2025 | — | — | — | — | — | — | — | — | — | — | | Based on a True Story |
| "Pretty Girls" (with Obanga) | 2025 | — | — | — | — | — | — | — | — | — | — | | Non-album single |
"—" denotes releases that did not chart or were not released in that territory.

=== As featured artist ===
List of singles as featured artist, with selected chart positions and certifications, showing year released and album name
| Title | Year | Peak chart positions | | | | | | | | | | Certifications | Album |
| Title | Year | US | BEL (FL) | FRA | GER | IRL | NED | NZ | SWE | SWI | UK | Certifications | Album |
|---|---|---|---|---|---|---|---|---|---|---|---|---|---|
| "When the Radio Is On" (Paul Shaffer featuring The Fresh Prince) | 1989 | 81 | — | — | — | — | — | — | — | — | — | | Coast to Coast |
| "I Sleep Much Better (In Someone Else's Bed)" (Billy Ocean featuring The Fresh Prince) | 1989 | — (Note: "I Sleep Much Better (In Someone Else's Bed)" peaked at number 60 on the Billboard Hot R&B/Hip-Hop Songs chart.) | — | — | — | — | — | — | — | — | — | | Greatest Hits |
| "Voices That Care" (as part of Voices That Care) | 1991 | 11 | — | — | — | — | — | — | — | — | — | | Non-album singles |
| "Boy You Knock Me Out" (Tatyana Ali featuring Will Smith) | 1999 | — (Note: "Boy You Knock Me Out" peaked at number 40 on the Billboard Rhythmic Songs chart and number 68 on the Hot R&B/Hip-Hop Songs chart.) | 6 | 32 | — | 19 | 77 | 12 | — | — | 3 | BPI: Silver | Kiss the Sky |
| "Fiesta" (Remix) (Bomba Estéreo featuring Will Smith and Ricky Reed) | 2015 | — (Note: "Fiesta" peaked at number 11 on the Billboard Hot Latin Songs chart.) | — | — | — | — | — | — | — | — | — | | Amanecer |
| "Live It Up" (Nicky Jam featuring Will Smith and Era Istrefi) | 2018 | — | 10 | 42 | 21 | — | 29 | — | 24 | 32 | — | | 2018 FIFA World Cup Official Theme Song |
| "Está Rico" (Marc Anthony featuring Will Smith and Bad Bunny) | 2018 | — (Note: "Está Rico" did not enter the Billboard Hot 100, but peaked at number four on the Bubbling Under Hot 100 Singles chart.) | — | — | — | — | — | — | — | — | — | | Non-album singles |
| "Team Tomadachi (Remix)" (Yuki Chiba featuring Will Smith) | 2024 | — | — | — | — | — | — | — | — | — | — | | Non-album singles |
"—" denotes releases that did not chart or were not released in that territory.

=== Promotional singles ===
List of promotional singles, showing year released and album name
| Title | Year | Album |
|---|---|---|
| "So Fresh" (featuring Biz Markie and Slick Rick) | 1999 | Willennium |

=== Other charted songs ===
List of other charted songs, showing year released and album name
| Title | Year | Peak chart positions | | | Certifications | Album |
| Title | Year | US Bub. | NZ Hot | UK | Certifications | Album |
|---|---|---|---|---|---|---|
| "Friend Like Me" | 2019 | — | 33 | 95 | RIAA: Platinum; BPI: Gold | Aladdin |
| "Prince Ali" | 2019 | 15 | 34 | — | RIAA: Gold; BPI: Silver | Aladdin |

== Guest appearances ==
List of non-single guest appearances, with other performing artists, showing year released and album name
| Title | Year | Other artist(s) | Album |
|---|---|---|---|
| "Dance or Die" | 1993 | DJ Jazzy Jeff | Made in America (soundtrack) |
| "Hey Sexy Lady" (Remix) | 2002 | Shaggy, Brian Gould, Tony Gould and Sean Paul | —N/a (Note: The version of "Hey Sexy Lady" on which Smith appears was released on some editions of the single.) |
| "Got to Be Real" | 2004 | Mary J. Blige | Shark Tale |
| "Icon" (Remix) | 2018 | Jaden Smith, Nicky Jam | —N/a |
| "Don't Be Afraid to Be Different" | 2019 | Logic | Confessions of a Dangerous Mind |
| "Will (Remix)" | 2020 | Joyner Lucas | —N/a |

== Music videos ==
List of music videos, showing year released and director(s)
| Title | Year | Director(s) | Ref. |
As lead artist
| "Men in Black" (featuring Coko) | 1997 | Robert Caruso | |
| "Just Cruisin'" (featuring Tichina Arnold) | 1997 | Robert Caruso | |
| "Gettin' Jiggy wit It" | 1997 | Hype Williams | |
| "Just the Two of Us" | 1998 | Bob Giraldi | |
| "Miami" | 1998 | Wayne Isham | |
| "Wild Wild West" (featuring Dru Hill and Kool Moe Dee) | 1999 | Paul Hunter | |
| "Will 2K" (featuring K-Ci) | 1999 | Robert Caruso | |
| "La Fiesta" | 1999 | F. Gary Gray | |
| "So Fresh" (featuring Biz Markie and Slick Rick) | 1999 | Will Smith | |
| "Freakin' It" | 2000 | Paul Hunter | |
| "Black Suits Comin' (Nod Ya Head)" (featuring Trā-Knox) | 2002 | Francis Lawrence | |
| "Nod Ya Head (The Remix)" (featuring Christina Vidal and Trā-Knox) | 2002 | Francis Lawrence | |
| "1000 Kisses" (featuring Jada Pinkett Smith) | 2002 | Antti Jokinen | |
| "Switch" | 2005 | Paul Hunter | |
| "Party Starter" | 2005 | Paul Hunter | |
| "Work of Art" (with Russ featuring Jaden) | 2024 | Willy Rodríguez | |
| "Beautiful Scars" (with Big Sean & Obanga) | 2025 | | |
As featured artist
| "I Sleep Much Better (In Someone Else's Bed)" (Billy Ocean featuring The Fresh Prince) | 1989 | Scott Kalvert | |
| "Voices That Care" (Voices That Care) | 1991 | Jim Yukich | |
| "Fiesta (Remix)" (with Bomba Estéreo and Ricky Reed) | 2015 | Carlos Pérez | |
| "Live It Up" (with Nicky Jam featuring Era Istrefi) | 2018 | Yasha Malekzad | |
| "Está Rico" (with Marc Anthony featuring Bad Bunny) | 2018 | Carlos Pérez | |
Guest appearances
| "A Little Romance" (The Boys) | 1988 | Desmond Gumbs | |
| "Where's the Party" (2 Too Many) | 1992 | Abdul Malik Abbott | |
| "Shy Guy" (Diana King) | 1995 | Michael Bay | |
| "Feels Like Summer" (Childish Gambino) | 2018 | Ivan Dixon, Greg Sharp, Justin Richburg | |

== See also ==
- DJ Jazzy Jeff & The Fresh Prince discography
