= List of awards and nominations received by Will Smith =

Will Smith awards and nominations
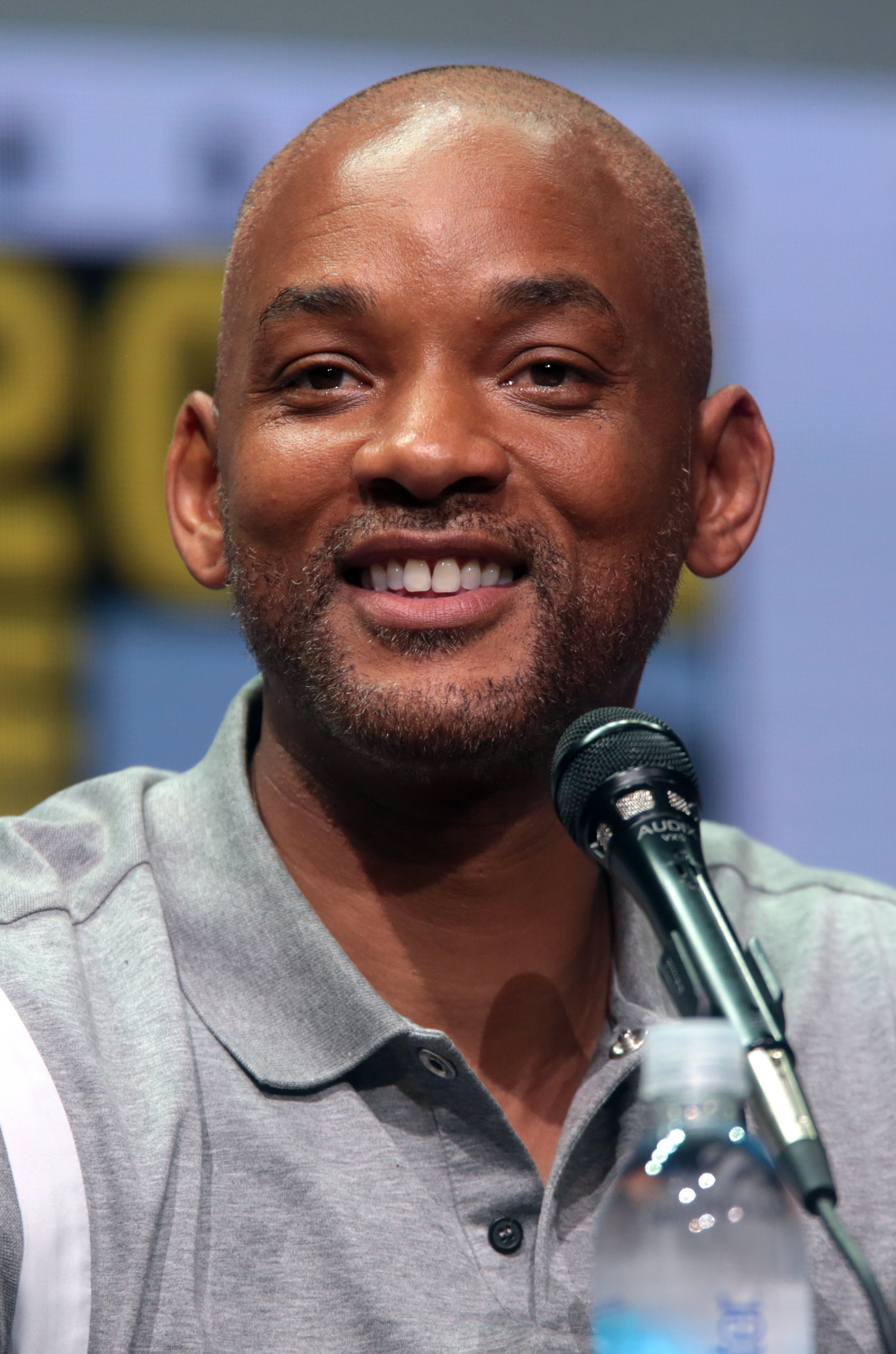
- Smith in 2017
Awards and nominations
Award	Wins	Nominations
Academy Awards	1	4
Emmy Awards	0	2
Grammy Awards	4	8
Tony Awards	0	1
BAFTA Awards	1	1
Golden Globe Awards	1	6
Screen Actors Guild Awards	1	3

The following is a list of awards and nominations received by American actor, rapper, and film producer Will Smith throughout his career.

As a rapper Smith won four Grammy Awards for Best Rap Performance for "Parents Just Don't Understand" (1989), Best Rap Performance by a Duo or Group for "Summertime" (1992), and Best Rap Solo Performance for both "Men In Black" (1998), and "Gettin' Jiggy wit It" (1999).

He received the Academy Award for Best Actor, BAFTA Award for Best Actor, Golden Globe Award for Best Actor in a Motion Picture – Drama and Screen Actors Guild Award for Outstanding Performance by a Male Actor in a Leading Role for his role as Richard Williams in the sports drama King Richard (2021). He was previously nominated for the Academy Award for Best Actor his portrayals of boxer Muhammad Ali in the sports drama Ali (2001) and struggling father Chris Gardner in the biographical drama The Pursuit of Happyness (2005).

He has been nominated for an Emmy Award for producing Cobra Kai (2021) and a Tony Award for producing Fela! (2009).

== Major associations ==
=== Academy Awards ===
Year	Category	Nominated work	Result	Ref.
2002	Best Actor	Ali	Nominated	
2007	Best Actor	The Pursuit of Happyness	Nominated	
2022	Best Actor	King Richard	Won	
2022	Best Picture	King Richard	Nominated	

=== BAFTA Awards ===
Year	Category	Nominated work	Result	Ref.
British Academy Film Awards
2022	Best Actor in a Leading Role	King Richard	Won	

=== Emmy Awards ===
Year	Category	Nominated work	Result	Ref.
Daytime Emmy Awards
1992	Outstanding Special Class Program	NBA All-Star Stay in School Jam	Nominated	
Primetime Emmy Awards
2021	Outstanding Comedy Series (as a producer)	Cobra Kai	Nominated	

=== Grammy Awards ===
Year	Category	Nominated work	Result	Ref.
1989	Best Rap Performance	"Parents Just Don't Understand" (with DJ Jazzy Jeff)	Won	
1990	Best Rap Performance	"I Think I Can Beat Mike Tyson" (with DJ Jazzy Jeff)	Nominated	
1991	Best Rap Performance by a Duo or Group	"And in This Corner..." (with DJ Jazzy Jeff)	Nominated	
1992	Best Rap Performance by a Duo or Group	"Summertime" (with DJ Jazzy Jeff)	Won	
1998	Best Rap Solo Performance	"Men In Black"	Won	
1999	Best Rap Solo Performance	"Gettin' Jiggy wit It"	Won	
2000	Best Rap Solo Performance	"Wild Wild West"	Nominated	
2001	Best Short Form Music Video	"Will 2K"	Nominated	

=== Golden Globe Awards ===
Year	Category	Nominated work	Result	Ref.
1993	Best Actor - Television Series Musical or Comedy	The Fresh Prince of Bel-Air	Nominated	
1994	Best Actor - Television Series Musical or Comedy	The Fresh Prince of Bel-Air	Nominated	
2002	Best Actor in a Motion Picture – Drama	Ali	Nominated	
2007	Best Actor in a Motion Picture – Drama	The Pursuit of Happyness	Nominated	
2016	Best Actor in a Motion Picture – Drama	Concussion	Nominated	
2022	Best Actor in a Motion Picture – Drama	King Richard	Won	

=== Screen Actors Guild Awards ===
Year	Category	Nominated work	Result	Ref.
2007	Outstanding Male Actor in a Leading Role	The Pursuit of Happyness	Nominated	
2022	Outstanding Male Actor in a Leading Role	King Richard	Won	
2022	Outstanding Cast in a Motion Picture	King Richard	Nominated	

=== Tony Awards ===
Year	Category	Nominated work	Result	Ref.
2010	Best Musical	Fela!	Nominated	

== Music ==
Organizations	Year	Category	Work	Result	Ref.
American Music Awards	1999	Favorite Pop/Rock Male Artist	Will Smith	Nominated	
American Music Awards	1999	Favorite Soul/R&B Male Artist	Will Smith	Won	
American Music Awards	1999	Favorite Pop/Rock Album	Big Willie Style	Won	
American Music Awards	1999	Favorite Soul/R&B Album	Big Willie Style	Won	
American Music Awards	2000	Favorite Soundtrack	"Wild Wild West"	Won	
American Music Awards	2000	Favorite Pop/Rock Male Artist	Will Smith	Won	
American Music Awards	2005	Favorite Pop/Rock Male Artist	Will Smith	Won	
MTV Video Music Awards	1989	Best Rap Video	"Parents Just Don't Understand" (with DJ Jazzy Jeff)	Won	
MTV Video Music Awards	1989	Best Direction in a Video	"Parents Just Don't Understand" (with DJ Jazzy Jeff)	Nominated	
MTV Video Music Awards	1991	Best Rap Video	"Summertime"	Nominated	
MTV Video Music Awards	1991	Best Direction in a Video	"Summertime"	Nominated	
MTV Video Music Awards	1997	Best Male Video	"Men in Black"	Nominated	
MTV Video Music Awards	1997	Best Video from a Film	"Men in Black"	Won	
MTV Video Music Awards	1997	Best Choreography in a Video	"Men in Black"	Nominated	
MTV Video Music Awards	1997	Best Special Effects in a Video	"Men in Black"	Nominated	
MTV Video Music Awards	1998	Best Male Video	"Just the Two of Us"	Won	
MTV Video Music Awards	1998	Video of the Year	"Gettin' Jiggy wit It"	Nominated	
MTV Video Music Awards	1998	Best Rap Video	"Gettin' Jiggy wit It"	Won	
MTV Video Music Awards	1998	Best Dance Video	"Gettin' Jiggy wit It"	Nominated	
MTV Video Music Awards	1998	Best Choreography in a Video	"Gettin' Jiggy wit It"	Nominated	
MTV Video Music Awards	1998	Viewer's Choice	"Gettin' Jiggy wit It"	Nominated	
MTV Video Music Awards	1999	Video of the Year	"Wild Wild West"	Nominated	
MTV Video Music Awards	1999	Best Video from a Film	"Wild Wild West"	Nominated	
MTV Video Music Awards	1999	Best Choreography in a Video	"Wild Wild West"	Nominated	
MTV Video Music Awards	1999	Best Male Video	"Miami"	Won	
MTV Video Music Awards	1999	Best Special Effects in a Video	"Miami"	Nominated	
MTV Video Music Awards	1999	Best Cinematography in a Video	"Miami"	Nominated	
MTV Video Music Awards	2002	Best Video from a Film	"Black Suits Comin' (Nod Ya Head)"	Nominated	
MTV Video Music Awards	2002	Best Special Effects in a Video	"Black Suits Comin' (Nod Ya Head)"	Nominated	
NRJ Music Awards	1999	International Male Artist of the Year	Himself	Won	
Soul Train Music Awards	2000	Best R&B/Soul or Rap Music Video	"Will 2K"	Nominated	
World Music Awards	2000	World's Best-Selling Male Dance Artist	Will Smith	Nominated	
World Music Awards	2000	World's Best-Selling Male Pop Artist	Will Smith	Nominated	
World Music Awards	2000	World's Best-Selling Male R&B Artist	Will Smith	Nominated	
World Music Awards	2000	World's Best-Selling Male Rap Artist	Will Smith	Nominated	

== Film and television ==
Organizations	Year	Category	Work	Result	Ref.
Blockbuster Entertainment Awards	1996	Favorite Male Newcomer	Bad Boys	Won	
César Awards	2005	Honorary César	—	Honoured	
Critics' Choice Awards	2002	Best Actor	Ali	Nominated	
Critics' Choice Awards	2007	Best Actor	The Pursuit of Happyness	Nominated	
Critics' Choice Awards	2021	Best Actor in an Action Movie	Bad Boys for Life	Nominated	
Critics' Choice Awards	2022	Best Picture	King Richard	Nominated	
Critics' Choice Awards	2022	Best Actor	King Richard	Won	
Golden Raspberry Award	2000	Worst Screen Couple (with Kevin Kline)	Wild Wild West	Won	
Golden Raspberry Award	2014	Worst Supporting Actor	After Earth	Won	
Golden Raspberry Award	2014	Worst Screenplay (with M. Night Shyamalan and Gary Whitta)	After Earth	Nominated	
Golden Raspberry Award	2014	Worst Screen Combo (with Jaden Smith)	After Earth	Won	
Shorty Awards	2019	Breakout YouTuber of the Year	Will Smith YouTube Channel	Nominated	
Shorty Awards	2019	Best Use of Facebook	Red Table Talk Social Media Campaign	Nominated	
Shorty Awards	2019	Best Use of Live Streaming	Will Smith Calls the International Space Station (Instagram)	Nominated	
Shorty Awards	2020	Instagram of the Year	Will Smith Getting to 50 Million Followers (Instagram)	Nominated	
Shorty Awards	2021	Best Use of Branded Content	Bad Boys for Life - Couples Therapy (YouTube)	Nominated	
