= Greatest Hits (Will Smith album) =

Greatest hits album by Will Smith
- Released: November 26, 2002
- Recorded: 1985–2002
- Length: 62:04 (US)
- Label: Columbia
- Producers: Rob Chiarelli; The Fresh Prince; Rob Fusari; Pete Harris; Hula; Jazzy Jeff; Sauce; Mark Wilson

Will Smith chronology
Born to Reign (2002)	Greatest Hits (2002)	Lost & Found (2005)

Professional ratings
Review scores
Source	Rating
AllMusic	4.5/5 stars
RapReviews	8/10 stars

Greatest Hits is a compilation album released by Will Smith. The album was released on November 26, 2002, and was his last release on Columbia Records. Greatest Hits is also the first compilation to bring together music from Smith's early work with DJ Jazzy Jeff and his solo career.

== Track listing ==
No.	Title	Writer(s)	Album	Length
1.	"Girls Ain't Nothing But Trouble" (1988 extended remix)	W. Smith, J. Townes	Rock the House	4:49
2.	"Parents Just Don't Understand" (single version)	W. Smith, J. Townes, P. Harris	He's the DJ, I'm the Rapper	5:14
3.	"A Nightmare on My Street" (single version)	W. Smith, J. Townes, P. Harris	He's the DJ, I'm the Rapper	4:58
4.	"The Fresh Prince of Bel Air"	W. Smith, J. Townes	Greatest Hits	2:55
5.	"Summertime"	W. Smith, J. Townes, L.H. Mahone, C. Simpkins, A. Taylor, R. Mickens, R. Bell, R. Bell, G. Brown, R. Westfield, D. Thomas, C. Smith	Homebase	4:29
6.	"Just Cruisin'"	W. Smith, N. Jones, K. Stover	Big Willie Style/Men in Black: The Album	3:59
7.	"1,000 Kisses" (radio edit; featuring Jada)	L. Vandross, W. Smith, J.P. Smith, J.C. Olivier, S. Barnes, M. McClain	Born to Reign	3:50
8.	"Men in Black"	W. Smith, P. Rushen, G. McFadden, F. Washington	Big Willie Style/Men in Black: The Album	3:47
9.	"Gettin' Jiggy wit It"	W. Smith, S. Barnes, B. Edwards, N. Rodgers, J. Robinson	Big Willie Style	3:48
10.	"Miami"	W. Smith, R. Toby, S. Barnes, W. Shelby, S. Shockley, L.F. Sylvers	Big Willie Style	3:17
11.	"Freakin' It"	W. Smith, P. Sawyer, M. McLeod, B. Edwards, N. Rodgers, S. Barnes, L. Bennett	Willennium	3:59
12.	"Will 2K" (featuring K-Ci)	Adams, L. Bennett, L. Bennett, L. Bennett, Benymon, Brisby, W. Smith, Sparks	Willennium	3:54
13.	"Wild Wild West" (featuring Dru Hill and Kool Moe Dee)	S. Wonder, W. Smith, R. Fusari, M. DeWese	Willennium/Wild Wild West	4:05
14.	"Nod Ya Head (The Remix)" (featuring Christina Vidal and Trá-Knox)	W. Smith, M. Sparks, L. Bennett, L. Feemster	Born to Reign	3:45
15.	"Just the Two of Us"	W. Smith, B. Withers, W. Salter, R. MacDonald	Big Willie Style	5:15
Total length:				64:04

== Certifications ==
Certifications and sales for Greatest Hits
Region	Certification	Certified units/sales
United Kingdom (BPI)	Gold	100,000^{*}
^{*} Sales figures based on certification alone.
