= Born to Reign =

Studio album by Will Smith
- Released: June 25, 2002
- Recorded: 2000–2002
- Genres: Hip-hop; pop-rap
- Length: 57:12
- Label: Columbia
- Producers: Tim & Bob, L.E.S., Jerry Allen, Rico Anderson, Rob Chiarelli, Tony Dofat, Ron Feemster, Herb Middleton, Jimane Nelson, Gregg Pagani, Poke, Rick Rock, Mark Sparks

Will Smith chronology
Willennium (1999)	Born to Reign (2002)	Greatest Hits (2002)

Singles from Born to Reign
- 1. "Black Suits Comin' (Nod Ya Head)" Released: June 11, 2002; 2. "1000 Kisses" Released: December 23, 2002

Professional ratings
Review scores
Source	Rating
AllMusic	4/5 stars
Blender	3/5 stars
Entertainment Weekly	B−
The Guardian	3/5 stars
HipHopDX	2.5/5
Q	3/5 stars
RapReviews	7.5/10
Rolling Stone	2/5 stars
Slant Magazine	3/5 stars
USA Today	3/4 stars

Born to Reign is the third studio album released by American actor and rapper Will Smith. The album was released on Columbia Records in the United States on June 25, 2002, and was considered a drop from his previous level of success, having only reached Gold status by the Recording Industry Association of America (RIAA), whereas Big Willie Style and Willennium both reached multi-platinum status. This album includes "Black Suits Comin' (Nod Ya Head)", which was also the lead single from the original motion picture soundtrack of Men in Black II. The album also spawned the European hit single "1000 Kisses", which features vocals from Smith's wife Jada Pinkett Smith.

== Reception ==
=== Critical ===
AllMusic gave the album a four-star rating.

=== Commercial ===
Born to Reign debuted at number 13 on the US Billboard 200, selling 60,000 copies in its first week. On July 26, 2002 the album has been certified gold by the Recording Industry Association of America (RIAA). As of April 2005, the album sold 237,000 copies in the US.

== Controversy ==
The album was released as a copy-protected disc, which reportedly not only prevented the contents of the disc from being copied, but froze users' computers after they attempted to listen to it via their CD-ROM drives. This resulted in complaints of lost computer files due to the album's protection element.

== Track listing ==
No.	Title	Writer(s)	Producer(s)	Length
1.	"Born to Reign (Intro)"	Will Smith; Rick Rock	Rick Rock; O.Banga^{[c]}	1:53
2.	"Act Like You Know"	Smith; Tim Kelley; Bob Robinson; Omarr Rambert; Richard Iverson; Ralf Hutter; Emil Schult	Tim & Bob; O.Banga^{[c]}; Tim Kelley^{[c]}	4:01
3.	"I Can't Stop"	Smith; Iverson; François Reyes; Nicolas Reyes; Manitas De Plata; Jean Claude Olivier; Samuel Barnes	Poke & Tone; Rob Chiarelli^{[b]}; O. Banga^{[c]}	4:57
4.	"Jaden's (Interlude)"			0:55
5.	"1,000 Kisses" (featuring Jada Pinkett-Smith)	Luther Vandross; Smith; Jada Pinkett-Smith; Olivier; Barnes; Michael D. Hepburn; Marion L. McClain	Poke & Tone; Chiarelli^{[b]}; O.Banga^{[c]}; Sauce^{[c]}; Bryon Jones^{[c]}	4:17
6.	"Willow Is a Player"	Smith; Tony Dofat; Lennie Bennett; LeMar Bennett; Lance Bennett; Ramon Adams; Theron Benymon; Arthur Brisby; Richard Poindexter; Robert Poindexter; Jackie Members; Ray Lewis	Tony Dofat; O.Banga^{[c]}	3:48
7.	"Black Suits Comin' (Nod Ya Head)" (featuring Trā-Knox)	Smith; Mark Sparks; Ron Feemster; Lennie Bennett; LeMar Bennett; Lance Bennett	Mark Sparks; Chiarelli; Smith; Ron Feemster^{[b]}	4:19
8.	"How Da Beat Goes"	Smith; Rico Anderson; Lennie Bennett; LeMar Bennett; Lance Bennett; Adams; Benymon; Brisby; Maurice Benjamin Cenac	Rico Anderson; O.Banga^{[c]}	4:14
9.	"Block Party"	Smith; Iverson; Nora Payne; Leshan Lewis; Herb Middleton; Sylvester Stewart; Robert Ginyard, Jr.	L.E.S.; Herb Middleton; O.Banga^{[c]}	4:13
10.	"Give Me Tonite"	Smith; Kelley; Robinson; Iverson; Adams; Benymon; Brisby; Mason Williams	Tim & Bob; O.Banga^{[c]}; Kelley^{[c]}	3:41
11.	"I Gotta Go Home"	Smith; Jimane Nelson; Sparks; Lennie Bennett; LeMar Bennett; Lance Bennett; Adams; Benymon; Brisby	Sparks; Chiarelli; Jimane Nelson^{[a]}	4:31
12.	"Maybe"	Smith; Sparks; Lennie Bennett; LeMar Bennett; Lance Bennett; Adams; Benymon; Brisby	Sparks; Chiarelli; Erick Walls^{[b]}; Jerry Allen^{[b]}	4:07
13.	"Nod Ya Head (The Remix)" (featuring Christina Vidal and Trā-Knox)	Smith; Sparks; Feemster; Lennie Bennett; LeMar Bennett; Lance Bennett	Chiarelli; Gregg Pagani; O.Banga^{[c]}	3:43
14.	"Momma Knows"	Smith; Curtis Wilson; Lennie Bennett; LeMar Bennett; Lance Bennett	Sauce	3:57
Total length:				57:12

Notes

- ^{^[a]} signifies a co-producer.
- ^{^[b]} signifies an additional producer.
- ^{^[c]} signifies a vocal producer.

Sample credits

- "Act Like You Know" - Contains a sample of "Trans-Europe Express" by Kraftwerk
- "I Can't Stop" - Contains a sample of "A Tu Vera" by Manitas de Plata
- "1,000 Kisses" - Contains samples of "Never Too Much" by Luther Vandross and "Future Now" by Pleasure
- "Willow Is a Player" - Contains a sample of "Love Gonna Pack Up (And Walk Out)" by The Persuaders
- "How Da Beat Goes" - Contains a sample of "Jam on It" by Newcleus
- "Block Party" - Contains samples of "Family Affair" by Sly and the Family Stone and "It Takes Two" by Rob Base & DJ E-Z Rock
- "Give Me Tonite" - Contains a sample of "Classical Gas" by Mason Williams

== Personnel ==
Personnel credits adapted from liner notes.

- Annas Allaf – guitar (tracks 3, 5), Rhodes (track 5), Pro Tools engineer (tracks 6, 8, 9, 11)
- Jerry Allen – additional production (track 12)
- Rico Anderson – producer and programming (track 8)
- Chandler Bridges – engineer (tracks 9, 14), Pro Tools engineer (tracks 1-3, 5, 6, 11, 12)
- David Campbell – string arrangements (tracks 3, 5, 11, 12)
- Rob Chiarelli – producer (tracks 7, 11-13), additional production (tracks 3, 5), bass (tracks 5, 6), guitar (track 6), engineer (tracks 1, 5, 6, 8, 11-13), mixing (tracks 1, 3, 5, 7-9, 11)
- Luis Conte – percussion (tracks 3, 11)
- Steve Churchyard – strings engineer (tracks 1, 3, 5, 11, 12), percussion engineer (track 11)
- Tony Dofat – producer (track 6)
- Brandon Duncan – engineer (track 3), Pro Tools engineer (tracks 1, 5, 6)
- Ron Feemster – additional production (track 7)
- Dominique Fillan – steel drums engineer (track 11)
- Bryan Golder – engineer (track 3), Pro Tools engineer (tracks 1, 5, 8-12, 14)
- Adam "DJ AM" Goldstein – DJ scratches (track 9)
- Andy Haller – engineer (track 2)
- Jerry Hey – horn arrangements (tracks 3, 11)
- Bryon Jones – vocal producer (track 5)
- John Kaplan – engineer (track 8)
- Tim Kelley – producer, vocal producer, and engineer (tracks 2, 10)
- Mar'Laina Kemp – background vocals (track 13)
- Knowledge – additional vocals (track 2)
- Abe Laboriel, Jr. – drums (track 11)
- L.E.S. – producer (track 9)
- Manny Marroquin – mixing (tracks 2, 6, 10)
- Herb Middleton – producer (track 9)
- Jamie Muhoberac – keyboards (track 5)
- Derek Nakamoto – string arrangements (track 1)
- Andy Narell – steel drums (track 11)
- Jimane Nelson – co-producer (track 11)
- Gregg Pagani – producer (track 13)
- Nora Payne – background vocals (track 9)
- Poke & Tone – producers (tracks 3, 5)
- Herb Powers Jr. – mastering
- O.Banga – vocal producer (tracks 1-3, 5, 6, 8-10, 13), additional vocals (track 2), executive producer
- Rick Rock – producer (track 1)
- Bob Robinson – producer (tracks 2, 10)
- Sauce – producer (track 14), vocal producer (track 5)
- Dexter Simmons – mixing (tracks 12, 14)
- Jada Pinkett-Smith – featured vocals (track 5)
- Will Smith – vocals, producer (track 7), executive producer
- Mark Sparks – producer (tracks 7, 11, 12)
- Kel Spencer – additional vocals (track 11)
- Trā-Knox – vocals
- Christina Vidal – featured vocals (track 13)
- Erick Walls – additional production (track 12)

== Charts ==
=== Weekly charts ===
Weekly chart performance for Born to Reign
Chart (2002)	Peak position
Australian Albums (ARIA)	58
Austrian Albums (Ö3 Austria)	20
Canadian Albums (Nielsen SoundScan)	29
Canadian R&B Albums (Nielsen SoundScan)	10
French Albums (SNEP)	61
German Albums (Offizielle Top 100)	19
Japanese Albums (Oricon)	30
New Zealand Albums (RMNZ)	39
Scottish Albums (Official Charts)	36
Swiss Albums (Schweizer Hitparade)	17
UK Albums (Official Charts)	24
UK R&B Albums (Official Charts)	15
US Billboard 200	13
US Top R&B/Hip-Hop Albums (Billboard)	13

=== Year-end charts ===
Year-end chart performance for Born to Reign
Chart (2002)	Peak position
Canadian R&B Albums (Nielsen SoundScan)	98
Canadian Rap Albums (Nielsen SoundScan)	53

== Certifications ==
Region	Certification	Certified units/sales
United States (RIAA)	Gold	237,000
