= Chris Gardner =

American businessman and motivational speaker (born 1954)

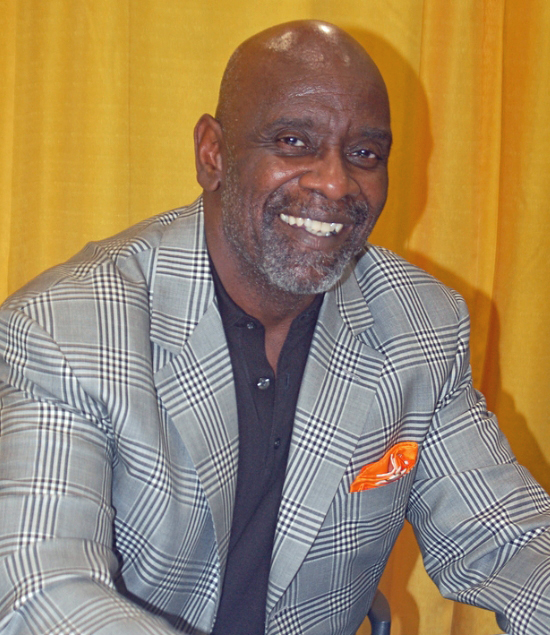
- Gardner in September 2011
- Born: Christopher Paul Gardner; February 9, 1954 (age 72); Milwaukee, Wisconsin, U.S.
- Occupation: Businessman, motivational speaker, stockbroker
- Known for: The Pursuit of Happyness
- Children: 2

Christopher Paul Gardner, Sr. (born February 9, 1954) is an American businessman and motivational speaker. He became a stockbroker in the mid-1970s and eventually founded his own brokerage firm, Gardner Rich & Co, in 1987. In 2006, Gardner sold his minority stake in the firm and published a memoir. The book was later made into the motion picture The Pursuit of Happyness.

== Early years ==
Gardner was born in Milwaukee, Wisconsin, on February 9, 1954, to Bettye Jean Gardner and Thomas Turner. He was the second child born to Bettye Jean. His older half-sister, Ophelia, is from a previous union. His younger sisters, Sharon and Kimberly, are children from his mother's marriage to Freddie Triplett.

Gardner did not have many positive male role models as a child, as his father was living in Louisiana during his birth, and his stepfather was physically abusive to both his mother and his sisters. Triplett's fits of rage made both Gardner and his sisters constantly afraid. In one incident, Bettye Jean was imprisoned when Triplett falsely reported her to the authorities for welfare fraud; the children were placed in foster care. When Gardner was eight years old, he and his sisters returned to foster care for the second time when their mother, unbeknownst to them, was convicted of trying to kill Triplett by burning down the house while he was inside.

While in foster care, Gardner first became acquainted with his three maternal uncles: Archibald, Willie, and Henry. Of the three, Henry had the most profound influence on him, entering Gardner's world at a time when he most needed a positive father figure. However, Henry drowned in the Mississippi River when Chris was nine years old. The children learned that their mother had been imprisoned when she arrived at Henry's funeral escorted by a prison guard.

Despite both her very unhappy marriage and her periods of absence, Bettye Jean was a positive source of inspiration and strength to her son Chris. She encouraged Gardner to believe in himself and sowed the seeds of self-reliance in him. Gardner quotes her as saying, "You can only depend on yourself. The cavalry ain't coming." Gardner also determined from his early experiences that alcoholism, domestic abuse, child abuse, illiteracy, fear, and powerlessness were all things he wanted to avoid in the future.

== Early adulthood ==
Inspired by his Uncle Henry's worldwide adventures in the U.S. Navy, Gardner decided to enlist when he finished secondary schooling. He was stationed at Camp Lejeune in North Carolina for four years, where he was assigned as a hospital corpsman. He became acquainted with a decorated San Francisco cardiac surgeon, Dr. Robert Ellis, who offered Gardner a position assisting him with innovative clinical research at the University of California Medical Center and Veterans Administration Hospital in San Francisco. Gardner accepted the position, and moved to San Francisco upon his discharge from the Navy in 1974. Over the course of two years, he learned how to manage a laboratory and to perform various surgical techniques. By 1976, he had been given full responsibility over a laboratory and had co-authored several articles with Dr. Ellis that were published in medical journals.

== Marriage and struggles ==
On June 18, 1977, Chris Gardner married Sherry Dyson, a Virginia native and an educational expert in mathematics. With his knowledge, experience, and contacts within the medical field, it appeared Gardner had his medical career plans laid out before him. However, with ten years of medical training ahead of him and with changes in health care just on the horizon, he realized that the medical profession would be vastly different by the time he could practice medicine. Gardner was advised to consider more lucrative career options; a few days before his 26th birthday, he informed his wife, Sherry, of his plans to abandon his dreams of becoming a physician.

His relationship with Sherry was detached, in part because of his decision to abandon a medical career and in part due to differences in their behavior. While still living with Sherry, he began an affair with a dental student named Jackie Medina, and she became pregnant with his child only a few months into the affair. After three years of marriage to Sherry, he left her to move in with Jackie and to prepare for fatherhood. Nine years elapsed before he and Sherry were legally divorced in 1986.

His son Christopher Jarrett Gardner Jr. was born on January 28, 1981. Gardner worked as a research lab assistant at UCSF and at the Veterans' Hospital after leaving the service. His position as a research lab assistant paid only about $8,000.00 a year (equivalent to $29,802 in 2026), which was not enough for him to support a live-in girlfriend and a child. After four years, he quit these jobs and doubled his salary by taking a job as a medical equipment salesman.

Prompted by his son's inquiries about his father, Gardner had previously been able to track down his biological father via telephone. With a higher income from his new job, Gardner was able to save enough money to travel to Monroe, Louisiana, where he and his son met his father, Turner, for the first time.

Gardner returned to San Francisco determined to succeed at business. A pivotal moment in his life occurred, after a sales call to a San Francisco General Hospital when he encountered an impeccably dressed man in a red Ferrari. Curious, Gardner asked the man about his career. The man told him he was a stockbroker and, from that moment on, Gardner's career path was decided. Eventually, Gardner bought a Ferrari of his own from Michael Jordan. The Illinois license plate of Gardner's black Ferrari reads "NOT MJ".

The stockbroker in the red Ferrari was a man named Bob Bridges. He met with Gardner and gave him an introduction to the world of finance. Bridges organized meetings between Gardner and branch managers at the major stock brokerage firms that offered training programs—such as Merrill Lynch, Paine Webber, E.F. Hutton, Dean Witter Reynolds, and Smith Barney. For the following two months, Gardner canceled or postponed his sales appointments, and his car amassed parking tickets while he met with managers.

It appeared that Gardner got his "break" when he was accepted into a training program at E.F. Hutton. He subsequently quit his sales job so that he could dedicate his time exclusively to training as a stockbroker. Then he appeared at the office ready to work, only to discover that his hiring manager had been fired the week before. To make matters worse, Gardner's relationship with Jackie was falling apart. According to Gardner, the police witnessed an incident in which Jackie was running away with Chris Jr. and Gardner attempted to take the child back, but in the process swung Jackie into the garden bushes, which resulted in her being scratched. Gardner was apprehended initially for this incident, but an identity check on his car license plate led them to detain him for non-payment of parking fines. He was taken to jail and a judge ordered that he stay there, for ten days, as punishment for being unable to pay $1,200.00 in parking tickets. Jackie then took Chris Jr. away to live with her on the East Coast, but she eventually decided not to press charges over the incident.

Gardner returned home from jail to find his apartment empty. With no experience, no college education, virtually no connections, and with the same casual outfit he had been wearing on the day he was taken into custody, Gardner gained a position in Dean Witter Reynolds' stock brokerage training program. However, this offered no salary; apart from selling medical equipment that brought between $300.00 to $400.00 a month in the early 1980s, and with no savings, he was unable to meet his living expenses.

== Fatherhood and homelessness ==
Gardner worked to become a top trainee at Dean Witter Reynolds. He arrived at the office early and stayed late each day, persistently making calls to prospective clients with his goal being 200 calls per day. His perseverance paid off when, in 1982, Gardner passed his Series 7 Exam on the first try and became a full employee of the firm. Eventually, Gardner was recruited by Bear Stearns & Company in San Francisco.

About four months after Jackie disappeared with their son, she returned and left him with Gardner. By then, he was earning a small salary and was able to afford rooming in a flophouse. He willingly accepted sole custody of his child; however, the rooming house where he lived did not allow children. Although he was gainfully employed, Gardner and his son secretly struggled with homelessness while he saved money for a rental house in Berkeley.

Meanwhile, none of Gardner's co-workers knew that he and his son were homeless in the Tenderloin District of San Francisco for nearly a year. Gardner often scrambled to place his child in daycare, stood in soup kitchens and slept wherever he and his son could find safety—in his office after hours, at flophouses, motels, parks, airports, on public transport, and even in a locked bathroom at a BART station.

Concerned for Chris Jr.'s well-being, Gardner asked Reverend Cecil Williams to allow them to stay at the Glide Memorial United Methodist Church's shelter for homeless women, now known as The Cecil Williams Glide Community House. Williams agreed without hesitation. Today, when asked what he remembers about being homeless, Christopher Gardner Jr. recalls "I couldn't tell you that we were homeless, I just knew that we were always having to go. So, if anything, I remember us just moving, always moving."

After Gardner had found a home, he resumed contact with Jackie and had a second child with her in 1985 – a daughter named Jacintha. Gardner turned down Jackie's offer for the two to get back together in a relationship, but arranged for Chris Jr. and Jacintha to stay with Jackie during his long hours at work.

== Career as a stockbroker and entrepreneur ==
In 1987, Gardner established the brokerage firm, Gardner Rich & Co, in Chicago, Illinois, an "institutional brokerage firm specializing in the execution of debt, equity, and derivative products transactions for some of the nation's largest institutions, public pension plans, and unions." His new company was started in his small Presidential Towers apartment, with start-up capital of $10,000.00 and a single piece of furniture: a wooden desk that doubled as the family dinner table. The "Rich" in the name was in honor of commodities trader Marc Rich, who had no connection to the company and whom Gardner had never met, but whom Gardner considered "one of the most successful futures traders in the world."

After Gardner sold his small stake in Gardner Rich in a multimillion-dollar deal in 2006, he became CEO and founder of Christopher Gardner International Holdings, with offices in New York, Chicago, and San Francisco. During a visit to South Africa to observe elections around the time of the 10th anniversary of the end of apartheid, Gardner met with Nelson Mandela to discuss possible investment in South African emerging markets. Gardner was planning an investment venture there which he hoped would create hundreds of jobs and introduce millions in foreign currency into the country's economy. Gardner has declined to disclose details of the project, citing securities laws.

== Philanthropic activity ==
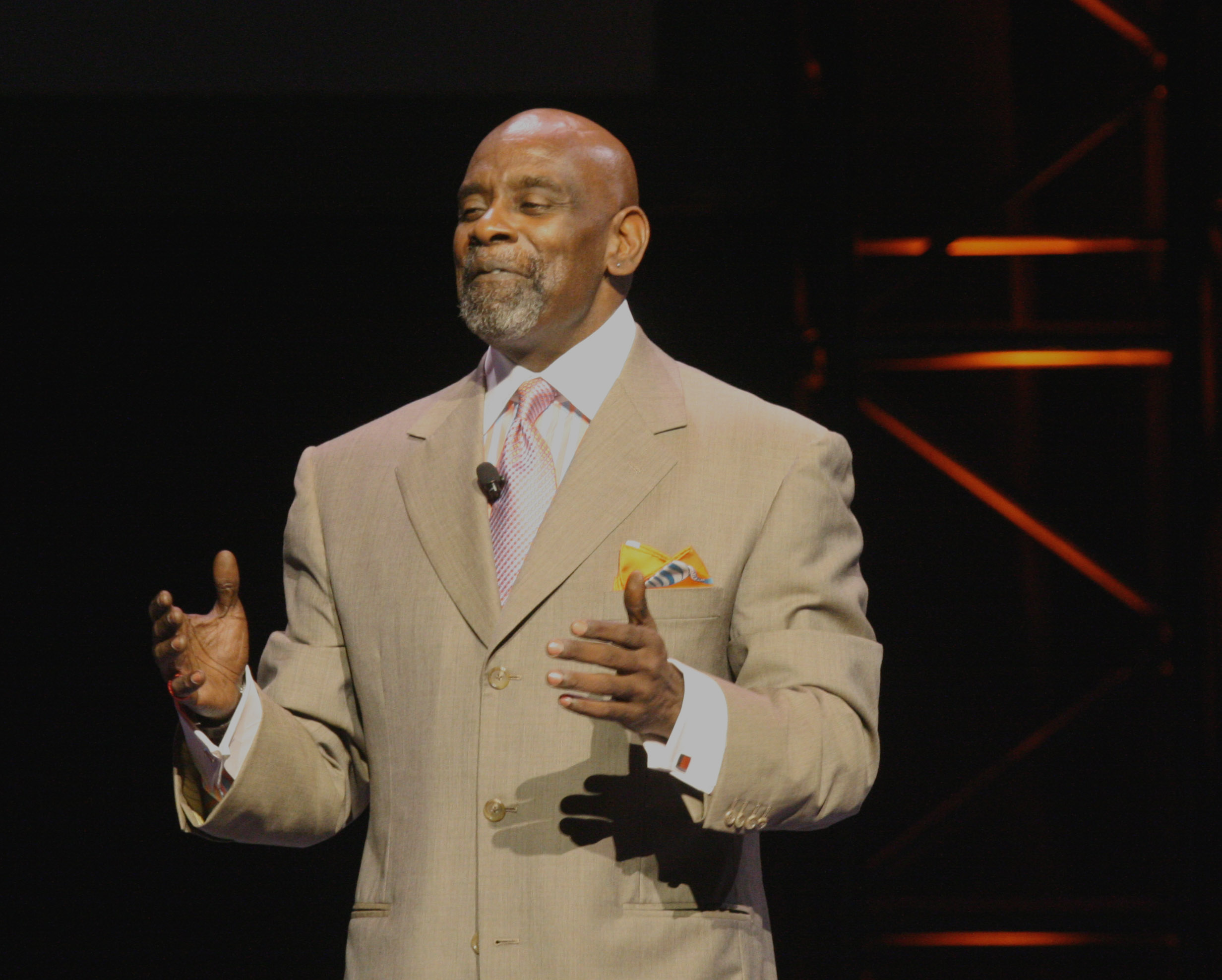
Chris Gardner in August 2007

Gardner is a philanthropist who sponsors many charitable organizations, primarily the Cara Program and the Glide Memorial United Methodist Church in San Francisco, where he and his son received desperately needed shelter. He has helped fund a $50 million project in San Francisco that creates low-income housing and opportunities for employment in the area of the city where he was once homeless. As well as offering monetary support, Gardner donates clothing and shoes. He makes himself available for permanent job placement assistance, career counseling and comprehensive job training for the homeless population and at-risk communities in Chicago.

Dedicated to the well-being of children through positive paternal involvement, Gardner is a board member of the National Education Foundation and sponsors two annual education awards: the National Education Association's National Educational Support Personnel Award and the American Federation of Teachers' Paraprofessionals and School-Related Personnel Award.

== Awards and honors ==
In 2002, Gardner received the Father of the Year Award from the NFI. He also received the 25th Annual Humanitarian Award from the Los Angeles Commission on Assaults Against Women (LACAAW), and the 2006 Friends of Africa Award from the Continental Africa Chamber of Commerce.

In 2008, he spoke at his daughter's graduation from Hampton University. He also served as the commencement speaker for the University of California, Berkeley's Spring 2009 graduation ceremony.

== In popular culture ==
=== The Pursuit of Happyness ===
Gardner realized his story had Hollywood potential after an overwhelming national response to an interview he did with 20/20 in January 2002. He published his autobiography on May 23, 2006, before becoming an associate producer of the major motion picture The Pursuit of Happyness, directed by Gabriele Muccino and released by Columbia Pictures on December 15, 2006. The unusual spelling of the film's title comes from a sign Gardner saw when he was homeless. In the film, "happiness" is misspelled (as "happyness") outside the daycare facility Gardner's son attends.

The movie, starring Will Smith, Thandiwe Newton and Jaden Smith, focused on Gardner's nearly one-year struggle with homelessness. The movie grossed $163 million domestically at the box office and over $300 million worldwide, making it one of Will Smith's consecutive $100 million blockbusters. As a result, it earned Will Smith an Academy Award-Nomination for Best Actor. The movie took some liberties with Gardner's true life story. Certain details and events that actually took place over the span of several years were compressed into a relatively short time and although eight-year-old Jaden portrayed Chris Jr. as a five-year-old, Gardner's son was just a toddler at the time. Chris Gardner reportedly thought Smith—an actor best known for his performances in action movies—was miscast to play him. However, he said his daughter Jacintha "set him straight" by saying, "If Smith can play Muhammad Ali, he can play you!" Gardner makes a cameo appearance in the film, walking past Will and Jaden in the final scene. Gardner and Will acknowledge each other; Will then looks back at Gardner walking away as his son proceeds to tell him knock knock jokes.

In the hope Gardner's story would inspire the down-trodden citizens of Chattanooga, Tennessee to achieve financial independence and to take greater responsibility for the welfare of their families, the mayor of Chattanooga organized a viewing of the film for the city's homeless. Gardner himself felt that it was imperative to share his story for the sake of its widespread social issues. "When I talk about alcoholism in the household, domestic violence, child abuse, illiteracy, and all of those issues—those are universal issues; those are not just confined to ZIP codes," he said.

Gardner was noticeably absent from the movie's premiere on December 15, 2006. He chose, instead, to be the guest inspirational speaker at a Christmas party for JHT Holdings, Inc., in Kenosha, Wisconsin.

=== Other appearances ===
Gardner was featured in the Canadian documentary Come on Down: Searching for the American Dream (2004), where he spoke about the American Dream at his office in downtown Chicago. The documentary also featured Bob Barker and Hunter S. Thompson.

Gardner also made a cameo appearance in the 2008 comedy film The Promotion, where he played a community leader.

== Bibliography ==
- The Pursuit of Happyness (2006)
- Start Where You Are: Life Lessons in Getting from Where You Are to Where You Want to Be (2009)
- Permission to Dream (2021)

== See also ==
- Rags to riches
