= The Pursuit of Happyness =

2006 film by Gabriele Muccino

- Theatrical release poster
- Directed by: Gabriele Muccino
- Screenplay by: Steven Conrad
- Based on: The Pursuit of Happiness by Chris Gardner; Quincy Troupe
- Produced by: Will Smith; Todd Black; Jason Blumenthal; James Lassiter; Steve Tisch
- Starring: Will Smith; Thandiwe Newton; Jaden Smith
- Cinematography: Phedon Papamichael
- Edited by: Hughes Winborne
- Music by: Andrea Guerra
- Production companies: Columbia Pictures; Relativity Media; Overbrook Entertainment; Escape Artists
- Distributed by: Sony Pictures Releasing
- Release date: December 15, 2006
- Running time: 117 minutes
- Country: United States
- Language: English
- Budget: $55 million
- Box office: $307.1 million

The Pursuit of Happyness is a 2006 American biographical drama film directed by Gabriele Muccino and starring Will Smith as Chris Gardner, a homeless salesman. Smith's son Jaden Smith co-stars, making his film debut as Gardner's son, Christopher Jr. The screenplay by Steven Conrad is based on the best-selling 2006 memoir of the same name written by Gardner with Quincy Troupe. It is based on Gardner's nearly one-year struggle being homeless. The intentional misspelling of the film's title comes from a mural that Gardner sees on the wall outside the daycare facility his son attended.

The film was released on December 15, 2006, by Sony Pictures Releasing, and received positive reviews, with Smith's performance and the emotional weight of the story garnering acclaim. The film went on to gross $307.1 million against a $55 million budget. Smith was nominated for an Academy Award and a Golden Globe for Best Actor.

== Plot ==
In 1981, San Francisco salesman Chris Gardner invests his entire life savings in portable bone-density scanners, which he demonstrates to doctors and pitches as a handy improvement over standard X-rays. The scanners play a vital role in Chris's life. While he can sell most of them, the time lag between the sales and his growing financial demands enrages his wife, Linda, who works as a hotel maid. The economic instability increasingly erodes their marriage, despite caring for Christopher Jr., their soon-to-be five-year-old son.

While out on a trip to sell one of his last scanners, Chris meets Jay Twistle, a lead manager and partner for Dean Witter Reynolds and impresses him by solving a Rubik's Cube during a taxi ride. After Jay leaves, Chris skips out on paying the fare as he lacks the money, causing the driver to angrily chase him into a BART station. Chris successfully escapes by boarding a train, but loses one of his scanners in the process. However, Chris' new relationship with Jay earns him the chance to become an intern stockbroker.

The day before the interview, Chris paints his apartment for free after his landlord begrudgingly lets him do so to postpone eviction for late rent. However, two policemen arrive to arrest Chris for multiple unpaid parking tickets. Chris is forced to spend the night in jail until the check clears the next morning, complicating his schedule for his interview. He narrowly arrives at Dean Witter's office on time, albeit still in shabby, paint-splattered clothes. Despite his appearance, Chris still impresses the interviewers and lands a six-month unpaid internship. He is among 20 interns competing for a paid position as a stockbroker.

Chris' unpaid internship does not please Linda, who leaves for New York since she might get a job at her sister's boyfriend's new restaurant. After Chris tells Linda she is incapable of being a single parent, she leaves Christopher in Chris' care. However, Chris is further set back when his already diminished bank account is garnished by the IRS for unpaid income taxes, and Chris and Christopher are evicted.

With only $21.33 in his bank account, Chris and Christopher are left homeless and desperate; Chris is able to get a motel room, but the locks are then changed when he is unable to pay on time. They are forced at one point to stay in a restroom at a BART station. Other days, the two spend nights at a homeless shelter, in BART, or, if Chris manages to procure sufficient cash, at a hotel. Later, he finds the bone scanner that he lost in the BART station earlier. However, Chris found it damaged, yet he still manages to repair it by selling his own blood for money availability and after that sells it to a physician, thus completing all sales of his scanners.

Disadvantaged by his limited work hours and knowing that maximizing his client contacts and profits is the only way to earn the broker position, Chris develops several ways to make sales calls more efficiently, including reaching out to potential high-value customers in person, a violation of firm protocol. One sympathetic prospect, Walter Ribbon, a top-level pension fund manager, even takes Chris and Christopher to a San Francisco 49ers game, where Chris meets some of Mr. Ribbon's friends, who are also potential clients. Regardless of his challenges, Chris never reveals his lowly circumstances to his colleagues, even going so far as to lend one of his supervisors, Mr. Frohm, $5 in his wallet for cab fare. Chris also studies for and aces the stockbroker license exam although he doubts that he did well.

As Chris concludes his last day of internship, he is summoned to a meeting with the partners. Mr. Frohm lets Chris know that he has won the coveted full-time position and reimburses Chris for the previous cab ride. Fighting back tears, he shakes hands with the partners, then rushes to Christopher's daycare to hug him. Sometime later, the two walk down a street joking with each other.

An epilogue reveals that Chris went on to form his own multimillion-dollar brokerage firm in 1987 and sold a minority stake in it in a multi-million-dollar deal in 2006.

== Cast ==
- Will Smith as Chris Gardner
- Jaden Smith (credited as Jaden Christopher Syre Smith) as Christopher Gardner Jr.
- Thandiwe Newton (credited as Thandie Newton) as Linda Gardner
- Brian Howe as Jay Twistle
- James Karen as Martin Frohm
- Dan Castellaneta as Alan Frakesh
- Kurt Fuller as Walter Ribbon
- Takayo Fischer as Mrs. Chu
- Mark Christopher Lawrence as Wayne
- Chris Gardner as Walking Man in Business Suit (uncredited)
- Geoff Callan as the Ferrari Owner

== Production ==
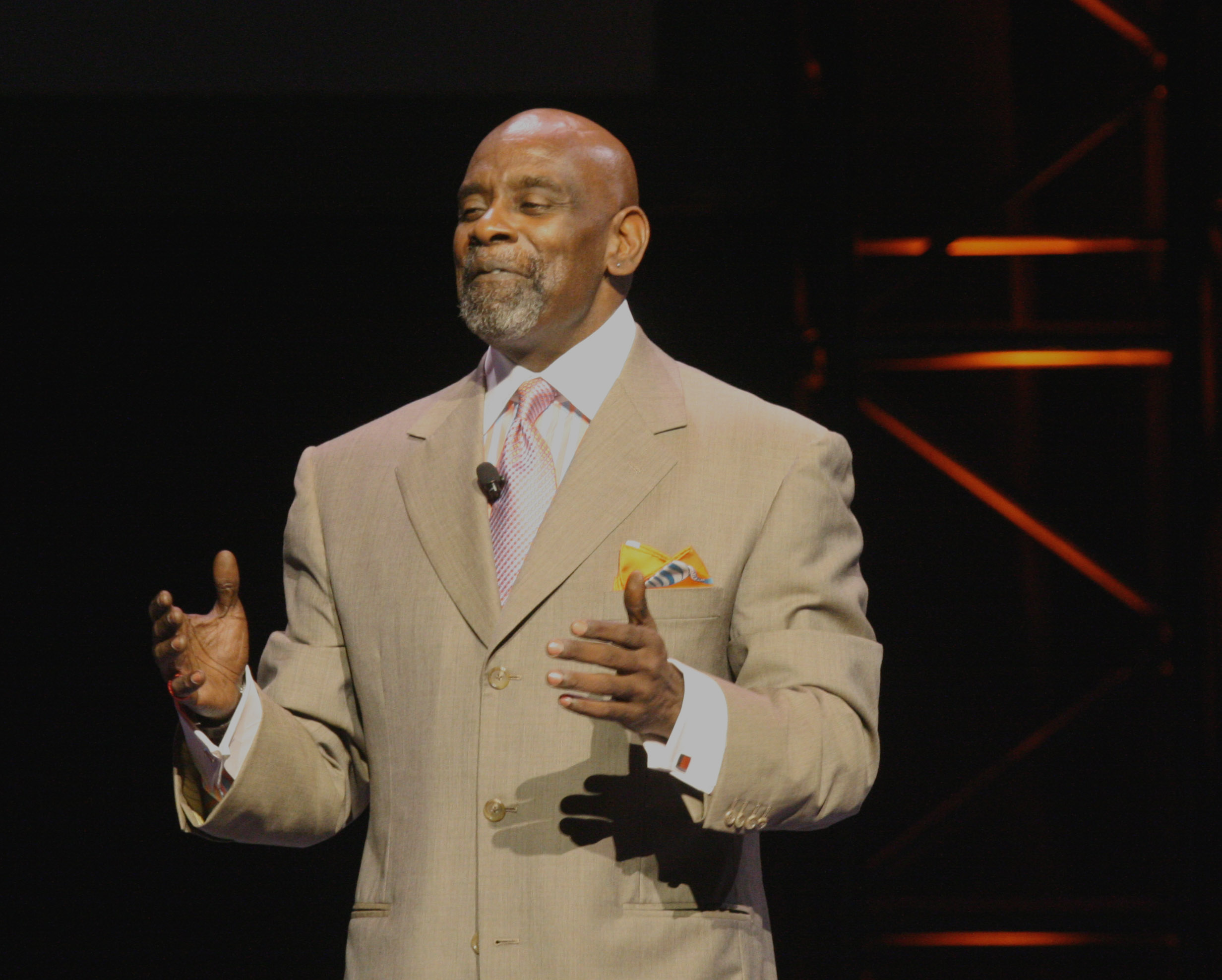
The film is based on the story of Chris Gardner's struggle with homelessness.

=== Development ===
Chris Gardner realized his story had Hollywood potential after an overwhelming national response to an interview he did with 20/20 in January 2003. Gardner published his autobiography on May 23, 2006, and later became an associate producer for the film.

In order to create dramatic impact, the film artistically altered Gardner's life story by compressing several years' worth of events into a shorter period of time. Gardner makes a tiny cameo at the end of the film, walking past the fictional version of himself.

=== Casting ===
Chris Gardner initially thought Will Smith, an actor best known for his performances in blockbuster films, was miscast to play him. However, Gardner claimed that his daughter Jacintha said, "If [Smith] can play Muhammad Ali, he can play you!", referring to Smith's role in the biopic Ali (2001).

=== Music ===
Varèse Sarabande released a soundtrack album with the score composed by Andrea Guerra on January 9, 2007.

No.	Title	Length
1.	"Opening"	3:09
2.	"Being Stupid"	1:39
3.	"Running"	1:30
4.	"Trouble at Home"	1:30
5.	"Rubiks Cube Taxi"	1:53
6.	"Park Chase"	2:29
7.	"Linda Leaves"	4:02
8.	"Night at Police Station"	1:36
9.	"Possibly"	1:45
10.	"Where's My Shoe"	4:20
11.	"To the Game/Touchdown"	1:37
12.	"Locked Out"	2:20
13.	"Dinosaurs"	2:40
14.	"Homeless"	1:55
15.	"Happyness"	3:50
16.	"Welcome Chris"	3:45
Total length:		40:00

Also in the film are brief portions of "Higher Ground" and "Jesus Children of America", both sung by Stevie Wonder, and "Lord, Don't Move the Mountain" by Mahalia Jackson and Doris Akers, sung by the Glide Ensemble.

The Japanese version uses "Shiawase no Chikara" by Sowelu as its theme song.

== Release ==
=== Box office ===
The film debuted first at the North American box office, earning $27 million during its opening weekend and beating out heavily promoted films such as Eragon and Charlotte's Web. It was Smith's sixth consecutive #1 opening and one of his consecutive $100 million blockbusters.

The film grossed $163,566,459 domestically in the US and Canada. In the hope that Gardner's story would inspire the down-trodden citizens of Chattanooga, Tennessee, to achieve financial independence and to take greater responsibility for the welfare of their families, the mayor of Chattanooga organized a viewing of the film for the city's homeless.

Gardner himself felt that it was imperative to share his story for the sake of its widespread social issues. "When I talk about alcoholism in the household, domestic violence, child abuse, illiteracy, and all of those issues—those are universal issues; those are not just confined to ZIP codes," he said.

=== Home media ===
The film was released on DVD on March 27, 2007, and as of November 2007, ADCCA – RPC Region 1 DVD sales (U.S./Canada/Bermuda) accounted for an additional $89,923,088 in revenue, slightly less than half of what was earned in its first week of release. About 5,570,577 units have been sold, bringing in $90,582,602 in revenue.

== Reception ==
=== Critical response ===
The Pursuit of Happyness received a generally positive response from critics, with Will Smith receiving widespread acclaim for his performance. Film review site Rotten Tomatoes calculated a 67% overall approval based on 177 reviews, with an average rating of 6.4/10. The site's critical consensus reads, "Will Smith's heartfelt performance elevates The Pursuit of Happyness above mere melodrama." Metacritic assigned the film a weighted average score of 64 out of 100, based on 36 critics, indicating "generally favorable reviews". Audiences polled by CinemaScore gave the film an average grade of "A" on an A+ to F scale.

In the San Francisco Chronicle, Mick LaSalle observed, "The great surprise of the picture is that it's not corny ... The beauty of the film is its honesty. In its outlines, it's nothing like the usual success story depicted on-screen, in which, after a reasonable interval of disappointment, success arrives wrapped in a ribbon and a bow. Instead, this success story follows the pattern most common in life—it chronicles a series of soul-sickening failures and defeats, missed opportunities, sure things that didn't quite happen, all of which are accompanied by a concomitant accretion of barely perceptible victories that gradually amount to something. In other words, it all feels real."

Manohla Dargis of The New York Times called the film "a fairy tale in realist drag ... the kind of entertainment that goes down smoothly until it gets stuck in your craw ... It's the same old bootstraps story, an American dream artfully told, skillfully sold. To that calculated end, the filmmaking is seamless, unadorned, transparent, the better to serve Mr. Smith's warm expressiveness ... How you respond to this man's moving story may depend on whether you find Mr. Smith's and his son's performances so overwhelmingly winning that you buy the idea that poverty is a function of bad luck and bad choices, and success the result of heroic toil and dreams."

Peter Travers of Rolling Stone awarded the film three out of a possible four stars and commented, "Smith is on the march toward Oscar ... [His] role needs gravity, smarts, charm, humor and a soul that's not synthetic. Smith brings it. He's the real deal."

In Variety, Brian Lowry said the film "is more inspirational than creatively inspired—imbued with the kind of uplifting, afterschool-special qualities that can trigger a major toothache ... Smith's heartfelt performance is easy to admire. But the movie's painfully earnest tone should skew its appeal to the portion of the audience that, admittedly, has catapulted many cloying TV movies into hits ... In the final accounting, [it] winds up being a little like the determined salesman Mr. Gardner himself: easy to root for, certainly, but not that much fun to spend time with."

Kevin Crust of the Los Angeles Times stated, "Dramatically it lacks the layering of a Kramer vs. Kramer, which it superficially resembles ... Though the subject matter is serious, the film itself is rather slight, and it relies on the actor to give it any energy. Even in a more modest register, Smith is a very appealing leading man, and he makes Gardner's plight compelling ... The Pursuit of Happyness is an unexceptional film with exceptional performances ... There are worse ways to spend the holidays, and, at the least, it will likely make you appreciate your own circumstances."

In the St. Petersburg Times, Steve Persall graded the film B− and added, "[It] is the obligatory feel-good drama of the holiday season and takes that responsibility a bit too seriously ... the film lays so many obstacles and solutions before its resilient hero that the volume of sentimentality and coincidence makes it feel suspect ... Neither Conrad's script nor Muccino's redundant direction shows [what] lifted the real-life Chris above better educated and more experienced candidates, but it comes through in the earnest performances of the two Smiths. Father Will seldom comes across this mature on screen; at the finale, he achieves a measure of Oscar-worthy emotion. Little Jaden is a chip off the old block, uncommonly at ease before the cameras. Their real-life bond is an inestimable asset to the on-screen characters' relationship, although Conrad never really tests it with any conflict."

National Review Online has named the film #7 in its list of 'The Best Conservative Movies'. Linda Chavez of the Center for Equal Opportunity wrote, "this film provides the perfect antidote to Wall Street and other Hollywood diatribes depicting the world of finance as filled with nothing but greed."

=== Accolades ===
Award	Category	Subject	Result
Academy Award	Best Actor	Will Smith	Nominated
BET Award	Best Actor	Will Smith	Nominated
Black Reel Award	Best Film		Nominated
Black Reel Award	Best Actor	Will Smith	Nominated
Black Reel Award	Best Breakthrough Performance	Jaden Smith	Nominated
Broadcast Film Critics Association Award	Best Actor	Will Smith	Nominated
Broadcast Film Critics Association Award	Best Young Performer	Jaden Smith	Nominated
Capri Hollywood International Film Festival	Best Picture		Won
Chicago Film Critics Association Award	Best Actor	Will Smith	Nominated
David di Donatello Award	Best Foreign Film		Nominated
Golden Globe Awards	Best Actor – Motion Picture Drama	Will Smith	Nominated
Golden Globe Awards	Best Original Song ("A Father's Way")	Seal	Nominated
MTV Movie Award	Best Male Performance	Will Smith	Nominated
MTV Movie Award	Best Breakthrough Performance	Jaden Smith	Won
NAACP Image Award	Outstanding Motion Picture		Won
NAACP Image Award	Outstanding Actor in a Motion Picture	Will Smith	Nominated
NAACP Image Award	Outstanding Supporting Actor in a Motion Picture	Jaden Smith	Nominated
NAACP Image Award	Outstanding Supporting Actress in a Motion Picture	Thandiwe Newton	Nominated
Nastro d'Argento	Best Score	Andrea Guerra	Nominated
Phoenix Film Critics Society Award	Best Young Actor	Jaden Smith	Won
Screen Actors Guild Award	Outstanding Performance by a Male Actor in a Leading Role	Will Smith	Nominated
Teen Choice Award	Choice Movie – Drama		Won
Teen Choice Award	Choice: Chemistry	Will Smith	Won
Teen Choice Award	Choice: Chemistry	Jaden Smith	Won
Teen Choice Award	Choice: Breakout Male	Jaden Smith	Won

== See also ==
- List of American films of 2006
- "Life, Liberty and the pursuit of Happiness"
