= Black Suits Comin' (Nod Ya Head) =

2002 single by Will Smith

Single by Will Smith introducing Trā-Knox

from the album Born to Reign and Men in Black II: Music from the Motion Picture
- Released: May 13, 2002
- Length: 4:20
- Label: Columbia
- Songwriters: Will Smith; Mark Sparks; Ron Feemster; Lennie Bennett; Lance Bennett; Lemar Bennett
- Producers: Mark Sparks; Rob Chiarelli; Will Smith; Ron Feemster

Will Smith singles chronology
"Freakin' It" (2000)	"Black Suits Comin' (Nod Ya Head)" (2002)	"1,000 Kisses" (2002)

Men in Black singles chronology
"Men in Black" (1997)	"Black Suits Comin' (Nod Ya Head)" (2002)	"Back in Time" (2012)

Music video
- "Black Suits Comin' (Nod Ya Head)" on YouTube

"Black Suits Comin' (Nod Ya Head)" is a song by rapper and actor Will Smith. The song was a part of the film Men in Black II's soundtrack and the first single on Smith's album Born to Reign.

== Background ==
The song was written for the 2002 Columbia Pictures action-comedy film Men in Black II, in which Smith portrays Agent J. The song was released as a single from the Men in Black II soundtrack on May 13, 2002. The single reached number 77 on the US Billboard Hot 100, but was more successful in the UK, peaking at number three on the UK Singles Chart. The song features vocals from Trā-Knox, who performs part of the hook in the chorus. In 2017, Limp Bizkit guitarist Wes Borland revealed that he had been approached by Smith to help compose the theme for Men In Black II, but he turned down the offer.

== Music video ==
The music video for "Black Suits Comin' (Nod Ya Head)" features footage of Smith performing onstage in a Men in Black II environment, featuring characters and footage from the movie. It is notable that a scene that was deleted from the final cut of the film appears in a montage sequence in the video. Smith's oldest son, Trey, and actress Meagan Good make cameos. The video was directed by Francis Lawrence, produced by Joseph Sassone and first aired on the June 3, 2002, episode of MTV show Making the Video.

== Track listings ==
- US 12-inch single

A1. "Black Suits Comin' (Nod Ya Head)" (radio edit) – 3:50
A2. "Black Suits Comin' (Nod Ya Head)" (album version) – 4:20
A3. "Black Suits Comin' (Nod Ya Head)" (instrumental) – 4:21
B1. "Nod Ya Head" (The Remix featuring Christina Vidal and introducing Trā-Knox) – 3:45
B2. "MIB2 Remix" – 3:45
B3. "Black Suits Comin' (Nod Ya Head)" (a cappella) – 4:06

- UK CD1
1. "Black Suits Comin' (Nod Ya Head)" (radio edit) – 3:50
2. "Nod Ya Head" (The Remix featuring Christina Vidal and introducing Trā-Knox) – 3:45
3. "MIB2 Remix" (album version) – 3:45
- UK CD2
1. "Black Suits Comin' (Nod Ya Head)" (album version) – 4:20
2. "Men in Black" (album version) – 3:47
3. "Miami" (album version) – 3:18
- UK cassette single
1. "Black Suits Comin' (Nod Ya Head)" (radio edit) – 3:50
2. "Men in Black" (album version) – 3:47
- European CD1
1. "Black Suits Comin' (Nod Ya Head)" (album version) – 4:20
2. "MIB2 Remix" (album version) – 3:45
- European CD2
1. "Black Suits Comin' (Nod Ya Head)" (album version) – 4:20
2. "MIB2 Remix" (album version) – 3:45
3. "Nod Ya Head" (The Remix featuring Christina Vidal and introducing Trā-Knox) – 3:45
4. "Black Suits Comin' (Nod Ya Head)" (instrumental) – 4:21
- European 12-inch single

A1. "MIB2 Remix" (album version) – 3:45
A2. "Black Suits Comin' (Nod Ya Head)" (album version) – 4:20
B1. "Nod Ya Head" (The Remix featuring Christina Vidal and introducing Trā-Knox) – 3:45
B2. "Black Suits Comin' (Nod Ya Head)" (instrumental) – 4:21

- Australian CD single
1. "Black Suits Comin' (Nod Ya Head)" (radio edit) – 3:50
2. "Nod Ya Head" (The Remix featuring Christina Vidal and introducing Trā-Knox) – 3:45
3. "Black Suits Comin' (Nod Ya Head)" (album version) – 4:20
4. "Black Suits Comin' (Nod Ya Head)" (instrumental) – 4:21

== Personnel ==
- Will Smith – vocals, production, mixing
- Mark Sparks – production
- Rob Chiarelli – production, mixing, engineering
- Neff-U – additional production
- Lance Bennett - Writing

== Charts ==
=== Weekly charts ===
Chart (2002)	Peak position
Australia (ARIA)	18
Australian Urban (ARIA)	6
Austria (Ö3 Austria Top 40)	7
Belgium (Ultratop 50 Flanders)	27
Belgium (Ultratop 50 Wallonia)	17
Denmark (Tracklisten)	11
Europe (Eurochart Hot 100)	3
Finland (Suomen virallinen lista)	17
France (SNEP)	27
Germany (GfK)	4
Hungary (Single Top 40)	8
Ireland (IRMA)	12
Italy (FIMI)	28
Netherlands (Dutch Top 40 Tipparade)	2
Netherlands (Single Top 100)	53
New Zealand (Recorded Music NZ)	30
Norway (VG-lista)	3
Romania (Romanian Top 100)	6
Scotland Singles (Official Charts)	5
Sweden (Sverigetopplistan)	10
Switzerland (Schweizer Hitparade)	5
UK Singles (Official Charts)	3
UK Hip Hop/R&B (Official Charts)	1
US Billboard Hot 100	77
US Hot R&B/Hip-Hop Songs (Billboard)	92
US Pop Airplay (Billboard)	23
US Rhythmic Airplay (Billboard)	31

=== Year-end charts ===
Chart (2002)	Position
Australia (ARIA)	98
Austria (Ö3 Austria Top 40)	51
Belgium (Ultratop 50 Flanders)	84
Belgium (Ultratop 50 Wallonia)	71
Europe (Eurochart Hot 100)	80
Germany (Media Control)	41
Sweden (Hitlistan)	77
Switzerland (Schweizer Hitparade)	32
UK Singles (OCC)	74

== Certifications ==
Region	Certification	Certified units/sales
Australia (ARIA)	Gold	35,000^{^}
Norway (IFPI Norway)	Gold	
^{^} Shipments figures based on certification alone.

== Release history ==
Region	Date	Format(s)	Label(s)	Ref.
United States	May 13, 2002	Rhythmic contemporary; contemporary hit radio	Columbia	
Australia	June 17, 2002	CD	Columbia	
Japan	June 19, 2002	CD	Sony	
United Kingdom	July 29, 2002	CD; cassette	Columbia	
