= Wipe Out (album) =

Studio album by The Surfaris
- Released: 1963
- Genre: Surf rock
- Length: 32:00
- Label: Dot
- Producer: Richard Delvy

The Surfaris chronology
| Wipe Out (1963) | Play (1963) |

Singles from Wipe Out
- 1. "You Can't Sit Down"/"Surfer Joe" Released: July 1965

Professional ratings
Review scores
| Source | Rating |
|---|---|
| New Record Mirror | 4/5 stars |

Wipe Out is a Dot Records album credited to The Surfaris, released in 1963. It contains their best known song "Wipe Out". It turned out that only two tracks, "Wipe Out" and "Surfer Joe" were actually played by The Surfaris, therefore repressings were titled Wipe Out and Surfer Joe and Other Popular Selections by Other Instrumental Groups. The remaining tracks were played by members of The Challengers plus other musicians. The Surfaris were signed to Decca Records, and their first album on that label was called Play (Decca DL 4470).

Dot released a single from this album in July 1965: "You Can't Sit Down", backed with "Surfer Joe", catalog number Dot 16757.

== Background ==
The album features cover versions of rock standards, minus the two originals, "Wipe Out" and "Surfer Joe". "Wipe Out" was written by all members of the band, whilst "Surfer Joe" was penned by drummer Ron Wilson.

== Track listing ==
| No. | Title | Writer(s) | Length |
|---|---|---|---|
| 1. | "Wipe Out" | Berryhill/Fuller/Connolly/Wilson/Pash | 2:12 |
| 2. | "Wiggle Wobble" | Les Cooper | 2:40 |
| 3. | "Torquay" | George Tomsco | 2:27 |
| 4. | "You Can't Sit Down" | Muldrow/Clark/Sheldon/Upchurch | 4:15 |
| 5. | "Green Onions" | Jackson/Jones/Steinberg/Cropper | 2:45 |
| 6. | "Tequila" | Chuck Rio | 2:05 |
| 7. | "Wild Weekend" | Todaro/Shannon | 2:33 |
| 8. | "Teen Beat" | Egnoian/Nelson | 3:10 |
| 9. | "Yep" | Eddy/Hazlewood | 2:45 |
| 10. | "Memphis" | Chuck Berry | 2:52 |
| 11. | "Surfer Joe" | Ron Wilson | 2:20 |
| 12. | "Walk, Don't Run" | Johnny Smith | 2:09 |

== Personnel ==
(on "Wipe Out" and "Surfer Joe")

- Rhythm guitar: Bob Berryhill
- Lead guitar: Jim Fuller
- Bass: Pat Connolly
- Drums: Ron Wilson
- Saxophone: Jim Pash

Production credits

- Producer: Richard Delvy
- Associate Producer: John Marascalco
- Arranged by Glenn Grey (guitarist of The Challengers)
