= Random Hero discography =

- Studio albums: 1
- Extended plays: 3
- Live albums: 0
- Compilation albums: 1
- Singles: 7
- Music videos: 3

The discography of the American active rock band Random Hero consists of three EPs, one compilation album, and five radio singles.

The band is produced exclusively by Ben Kasica, famed guitarist of the band Skillet. Random Hero is known for their energy charged live shows and widely appealing music.

The band has worked with MTV, the ESPN X-Games, AMA Motocross, the Go Fast Extreme Games, and is the exclusive band for the Live the Dream Tour. Live the Dream Tour is an organization that holds unique assembly programs for high school and middle school students in order to donate money to the fledgling school music programs.

== Studio albums ==
Recorded at B Train Studios, Carry Me, Bury Me is the first LP released by Random Hero and is slated to be released on June 18, 2013.

Year	Details
2013	Carry Me, Bury Me: To Be Released: June 18, 2013; Recorded: B Train Studios; Engineered & Mixed by Joshua Bertrand; Produced: Random Hero; Label: RHeromusic; Format: CD, Digital Download

=== Carry Me, Bury Me Album Track listing ===
No.	Title	Writer(s)	Length
1.	"A Prayer Before The Storm"	Aaron Watkins & Joshua Bertrand
2.	"Mercy"	Aaron Watkins & Joshua Bertrand
3.	"Halo"	Aaron Watkins & Joshua Bertrand
4.	"Carry Me Bury Me"	Aaron Watkins & Joshua Bertrand
5.	"Last Romance"	Aaron Watkins & Joshua Bertrand
6.	"Crash and Burn"	Aaron Watkins & Joshua Bertrand
7.	"I Don't Care"	Aaron Watkins & Joshua Bertrand
8.	"You Won't Relent"	Aaron Watkins & Joshua Bertrand
9.	"Unbreakable"	Aaron Watkins & Joshua Bertrand
10.	"Hand Grenade"	Aaron Watkins & Joshua Bertrand
11.	"One To Blame"	Aaron Watkins & Joshua Bertrand
12.	"Home"	Aaron Watkins & Joshua Bertrand
13.	"Halo (Acoustic Version)"	Aaron Watkins & Joshua Bertrand

== Compilation albums ==
The Random Hero EP is the first compilation EP released by Random Hero. The Random Hero EP is only available on max3's website for download. The band recorded the new songs at Spiked Audio in Highlands Ranch, CO in 2008 and was released in November 20, 2009.

Year	Details
2009	Random Hero EP: Released: November 20, 2009; Recorded: Spiked Audio; Engineered & Mixed by Michael Morrissey; Produced: Scottie Flint; Label: FURY ARTIST / Fury Sound; Format: Digital Download (max3 systems inc.)

=== Random Hero EP Track listing ===
No.	Title	Writer(s)	Length
1.	"Ammunition"	Aaron Watkins & Joshua Bertrand	3:34
2.	"Get Away"	Aaron Watkins & Joshua Bertrand	3:00
3.	"Pull the Trigger"	Aaron Watkins & Joshua Bertrand	3:23
4.	"Fighting a Beautiful Fate"	Aaron Watkins & Joshua Bertrand	3:06
5.	"Playing With Fire"	Aaron Watkins & Joshua Bertrand	3:25
6.	"Sleepless"	Aaron Watkins & Joshua Bertrand	3:38
7.	"Satisfied"	Aaron Watkins & Joshua Bertrand	4:38
8.	"Closer"	Aaron Watkins & Joshua Bertrand	4:32
9.	"Runaway"	Aaron Watkins & Joshua Bertrand	3:51
10.	"Caught Between"	Aaron Watkins & Joshua Bertrand	3:21
11.	"Satisfied (feat Noe of The Crimson Red)"	Aaron Watkins & Joshua Bertrand	3:30
12.	"DaBeers Palladio"	Aaron Watkins & Joshua Bertrand	1:53
13.	"Breathe"	Aaron Watkins & Joshua Bertrand	3:56
14.	"Breathe (Acoustic)"	Aaron Watkins & Joshua Bertrand	4:16
15.	"Pull the Trigger (Acoustic)"	Aaron Watkins & Joshua Bertrand	3:49

== Extended plays ==
The EP (aka the Black EP) is the first extended play EP released by Random Hero. The Black EP was distributed at shows and as an iTunes download, with a black background to the cover art, hence the unofficial alternate name to distinguish from the later release by the same name. The band recorded the new songs at Spiked Audio in Highlands Ranch, CO and was released in October 13, 2009, by Fury Records.

Year	Details
2009	The EP (Black): Released: October 13, 2009; Recorded: Spiked Audio; Engineered & Mixed by Michael Morrissey; Produced: Scottie Flint; Label: Fury Records; Format: Digital Download (iTunes Store, Amazon.com)

=== The Black EP Track listing ===
No.	Title	Writer(s)	Length
1.	"Pull the Trigger"	Aaron Watkins & Joshua Bertrand	3:25
2.	"Breathe"	Aaron Watkins & Joshua Bertrand	3:52
3.	"Lullaby"	Aaron Watkins & Joshua Bertrand	3:09
4.	"Done Pretending"	Aaron Watkins & Joshua Bertrand	4:28
5.	"Good Morning"	Aaron Watkins & Joshua Bertrand	3:06

The EP (White EP) is the second extended play EP released by Random Hero. The White EP was only distributed at shows, and only in white sleeve packaging, hence the unofficial alternate name. The band recorded the new songs at Spiked Audio in Highlands Ranch, CO and was released in May 2010, by Fury Records.

Year	Details
2010	"The EP (White)": Released: May 2010; Recorded: Spiked Audio; Engineered & Mixed by Michael Morrissey; Produced: Scottie Flint; Label: Fury Records; Format: CD (Sold at Shows Only)

=== The White EP Track listing ===
No.	Title	Writer(s)	Length
1.	"Blood of a Murderer"	Aaron Watkins & Joshua Bertrand	3:16
2.	"In the End"	Aaron Watkins & Joshua Bertrand	4:04
3.	"Behind the Curtain"	Aaron Watkins & Joshua Bertrand	4:03
4.	"Pull the Trigger"	Aaron Watkins & Joshua Bertrand	3:25
5.	"Breathe"	Aaron Watkins & Joshua Bertrand	3:52
6.	"Lullaby"	Aaron Watkins & Joshua Bertrand	3:09
7.	"Done Pretending"	Aaron Watkins & Joshua Bertrand	4:30
8.	"Good Morning"	Aaron Watkins & Joshua Bertrand	3:03

The Breakdown EP is the third extended play EP released by Random Hero. Pre-production on a number of songs started in September 2010. On November 1, 2010, the band began recording the new songs at Kasiaca’s, Skies Fall Studios, in Kenosha, WI and was released in May 2011, by Skies Fall Records.

Year	Details
2011	Breakdown EP: Released: May 20, 2011; Recorded: Skies Fall Studios; Engineered & Mixed by Nick Radovanovic; Produced: Ben Kasica, Joseph Snyder (executive); Label: Skies Fall Records/Fury Records; Format: CD ( Sold at Shows Only), Digital Download (iTunes Store)

=== Breakdown EP Track listing ===
No.	Title	Writer(s)	Length
1.	"Freak Show"	Aaron Watkins, Joshua Bertrand, Ben Kasica & Chris Semel	3:36
2.	"Honey"	Aaron Watkins, Joshua Bertrand, Ben Kasica & Chris Semel	3:45
3.	"Breakdown"	Aaron Watkins, Joshua Bertrand & Ben Kasica	3:43

== Singles ==
Year	Single	Peak chart positions						Certifications	Album
Year	Single	US	US Main.	US Rock	US Christ Rock	US Christ Recuurent	CR.net	Certifications	Album
2009	"Good Morning"	—	—	—	—	—	—		The EP (Black)
2009	"Ammunition"	—	—	—	—	—	—		Random Hero EP
2009	"Get Away"	—	—	—	—	—	—		Random Hero EP
2009	"Pull the Trigger"	—	—	—	—	—	—		Random Hero EP
2011	"Breakdown"	—	—	—	9	2	20		Breakdown EP
2011	"Freak Show"	—	—	—	27	—	—		Breakdown EP
2013	"Mercy"	—	—	—	—	—	—		Carry Me, Bury Me
2013	"You Won't Relent"	—	—	—	—	—	—		Carry Me, Bury Me
"—" denotes a release that did not chart.

== Compilation appearances ==
Year	Album	Song(s)
2010	"Guardian Challenge"	Guardians of Freedom
