= Musicians Hall of Fame and Museum =

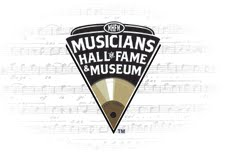

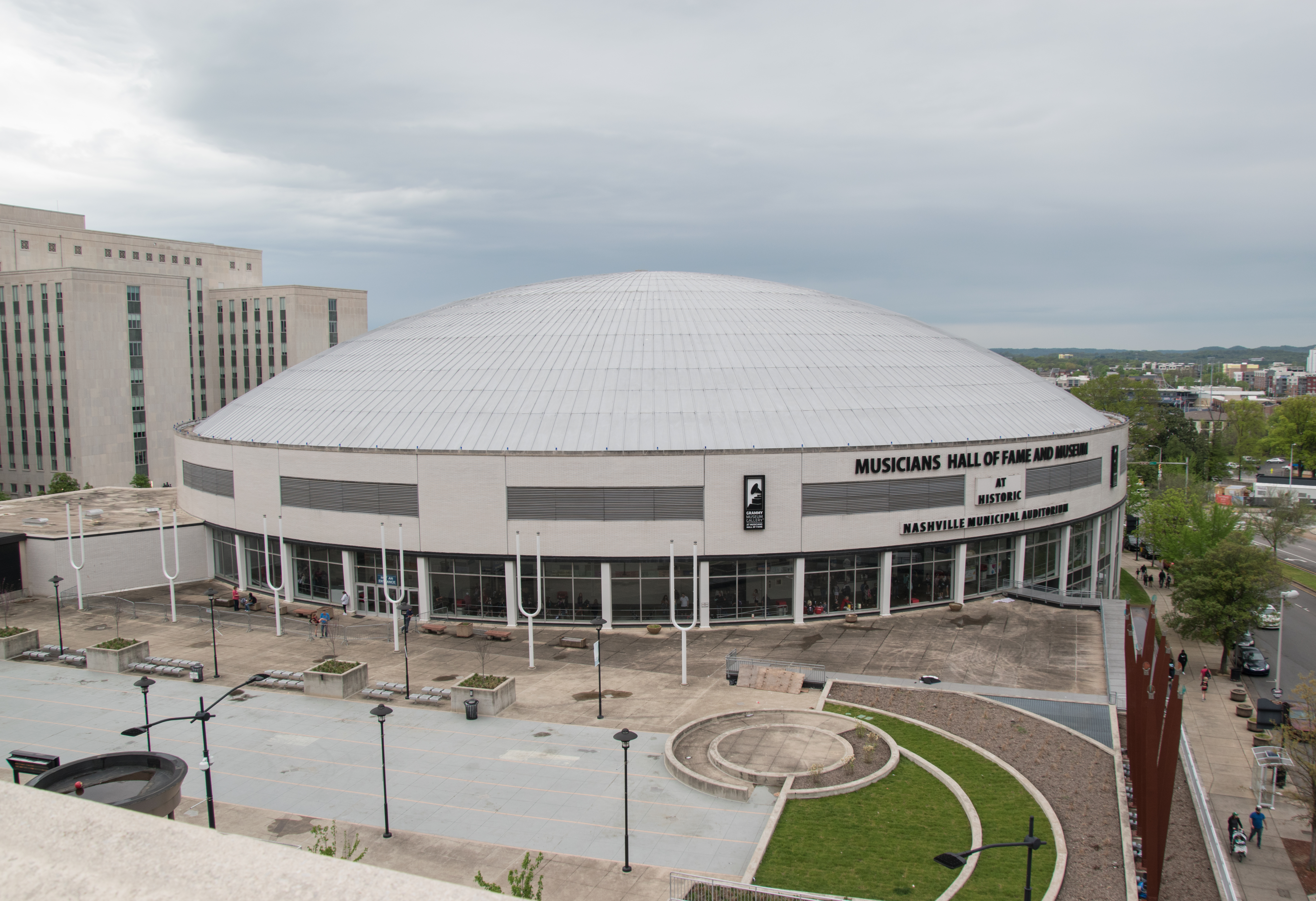
- Established: 2006
- Location: 401 Gay Street, Nashville, Tennessee
- Coordinates: 36.158303°N 86.776332°W
- Type: Hall of Fame and Museum
- Founders: Joe Chambers; Linda Chambers
- CEO: Linda Chambers
- Curator: Linda Chambers
- Website: www.musicianshalloffame.com

The Musicians Hall of Fame and Museum is a museum and hall of fame in Nashville, Tennessee. It documents the session musicians, producers, and engineers who have influenced popular recorded music and exhibits instruments that have been used to record influential songs.

== Museums ==
In November 2003, Joe Frank Chambers and his wife Linda Chambers co-founded what would become Musicians Hall of Fame and Museum. They purchased a 30,000 square foot building at 301 6th Ave. S., Nashville, Tennessee across from the Country Music Hall of Fame and began renovating. After two and half years, they first opened the MHOFM to the public on June 6, 2006. The 30,000-square-foot facility was unique in the world, and its annual awards galas were star-studded affairs. The museum was voted venue of the year 2008 by the Meeting Professionals International. Exhibits consisted of instruments owned and played by well-known artists as well as behind-the-scenes session musicians.

Session musicians were often the house musicians in cities such as Memphis, Los Angeles, Detroit, Nashville, Muscle Shoals and New York City. Though they were frequently the ones behind the hits of many celebrated artists, their contributions were essential to the sound of an era. These relatively small groups of skilled players performed on countless hit singles throughout the 1950s, 1960s, 1970s, and 1980s.

In 2009–10, the city of Nashville seized the building (under the rules of eminent domain) to make way for the construction of The Music City Center. The artifacts were then stored in designated buildings, but many were damaged in the 2010 Nashville flood.

In 2013, the museum found a new home in the spacious old exhibit hall of Municipal Auditorium, which more than doubled the size of the original museum. On August 29, 2013, the MHOFM reopened on the first floor of the historic Nashville Municipal Auditorium just off the James Robertson Parkway exit at 401 Gay Street, Nashville, TN 37219. The 200,000 square foot building houses the historic 10,000-seat Municipal Auditorium. The 68,000 sq. ft. exhibit floor, which was also Nashville's first convention center, houses the museum and its artifacts.

== Inductees ==
=== 2007 (1st) ===
- The Funk Brothers
- The Nashville A-Team
- The Wrecking Crew
- The Blue Moon Boys, The Memphis Boys
- The Tennessee Two

The inaugural ceremony was highlighted by the performances of Garth Brooks, Vince Gill, Peter Frampton, George Jones, Amy Grant, Rodney Crowell, B.J. Thomas, and Dobie Gray honoring the evening's inductees.

=== 2008 (2nd) ===
- Billy Sherrill
- The Crickets
- Al Kooper
- Duane Eddy
- The Memphis Horns
- Booker T. & the M.G.'s
- The Muscle Shoals Rhythm Section & Friends

Keith Richards, Kid Rock, Phil Everly and Lee Ann Womack were among the performers to welcome the inductees. Richards joined The Crickets on stage for a performance of Holly's "Not Fade Away", which The Rolling Stones covered in 1964.

=== 2009 (3rd) ===
- Chet Atkins
- Toto
- Victor Feldman
- Charlie Daniels
- Fred Foster
- Billy Cox
- Paul Riser
- Dick Dale

Toto was joined on stage by Rascal Flatts to perform "Rosanna", "Hold The Line", "I'll Be Over You" and "Africa". Steve Wariner, Paul Yandell, Tony Joe White and Beach Boys guitarist Al Jardine were among the other performers at the ceremony.

=== 2014 (4th) ===
After a four-year absence due to relocating, the 2014 Induction Ceremony was held in the museum's new location on January 28, 2014.

- Barbara Mandrell
- Peter Frampton
- Randy Bachman
- Stevie Ray Vaughan and Double Trouble
- Corki Casey O'Dell
- Velma Smith
- Will Lee
- Ben Keith
- Jimmy Capps
- Buddy Guy
- Mike Curb
- Roy Orbison was also honored with a special posthumous honor – the 2014 "iconic riff" award for the famous guitar lick in his hit "Pretty Woman".

=== 2016 (5th) ===
The Musicians Hall of Fame held its 5th annual Induction Ceremony and Concert.

- Garth Brooks and his studio musicians The G-Men
- Studio musicians from Sigma Sound Studios in Philadelphia
- "Iconic Riff" winner Don Felder formerly with the Eagles for "Hotel California"
- Ricky Skaggs
- Jerry Reed (posthumously)
- Producer Allen Reynolds
- Engineers Lou Bradley, Ron 'Snake' Reynolds, Joe Tarsia, and Mark Miller.

Special guests included: Kenny G, Bruce Hornsby, Steve Wariner, Russell Thompkins Jr. and Peter Frampton.

=== 2019 (6th) ===
The Musicians Hall of Fame held its 6th Induction Concert and Ceremony on October 22, 2019 at the Schermerhorn Symphony Center.

- Bob Taylor of Taylor Guitars
- Eddie Bayers
- Paul Franklin
- John Hobbs
- Brent Mason
- Michael Rhodes of The Players
- Owen Bradley
- Bob Berryhill
- Pat Connolly
- Drummers Jim Fuller and Ron Wilson of The Surfaris
- David Briggs
- Jerry Carrigan
- Norbert Putnam
- Terry Thompson, Earl Peanutt Montgomery, Joe South, and Reggie Young of the Original Muscle Shoals Rhythm Section
- Harrison Calloway, Ronnie Eades, Charles Rose, and Harvey Thompson of the Muscle Shoals Horns
- Don Everly of The Everly Brothers
- Record engineer Billy Sharrill
- Jeff Cook, Teddy Gentry, and Randy Owen of Alabama
- Felix Cavaliere of The Rascals
- Steve Wariner

The Induction Ceremony was hosted by Paul Shaffer. Guest performers included Jason Aldean, Mandy Barnett, Garth Brooks, Kix Brooks, Zac Brown, Ronnie Dunn, Mike Farris, Vince Gill, Emmylou Harris, Keb' Mo', and Ricky Skaggs.

=== 2022 (7th) ===
The Musicians Hall of Fame held its 7th Induction Concert and Ceremony on November 20, 2022 at the Nashville Municipal Auditorium.

- Billy Gibbons
- Don McLean
- Marty Stuart and The Fabulous Superlatives
- Ray Stevens
- George Massenburg
- James William Guercio
- Vince Gill

The Induction Ceremony was hosted by Phil Vassar. Guest performers included Rodney Crowell, Steve Miller, Wendy Moten and Mike Farris.

=== 2026 (8th) ===
The Musicians Hall Of Fame Concert held its 8th Induction Ceremony on April 28, 2026 at Richard B. Fisher Center for Performing Arts.

- Dann Huff
- Dolly Parton
- George Thorogood & The Destroyers
- John Boylan
- Keith Urban
- Leland Sklar
- Michael McDonald
- Nicky Hopkins

== Closing and reopening ==
In February 2010, under the rules of eminent domain, the city of Nashville purchased the MHOF property in order to make room for the Music City Center (new convention center). On August 29, 2013, the MHOF reopened on the first floor of the historic Nashville Municipal Auditorium just off the James Robertson Parkway exit at 401 Gay Street, Nashville, TN 37219. The 200,000 square foot building houses the historic 10,000 seat Municipal Auditorium. The 68,000 sq. ft. exhibit floor, which was also Nashville's first convention center, will now house the museum and its artifacts.

== See also ==
- List of music museums
