= MystiMayhem =

American singer-songwriter

Mysti Mayhem
- Also known as: Mysti Mayhem
- Born: Misty Dawn Naholnik; May 14, 1984 (age 42); Pennsylvania, United States
- Genres: Folk music, folk rock, acoustic rock, blues, country music
- Occupations: Singer-songwriter, musician
- Instruments: Vocals, guitar, piano, keyboard, banjo, bass, harmonica, cello, drum
- Years active: 1999–present
- Label: Sellaband
- Members: Mysti Mayhem (Mysti Dawn Naholnik)
- Website: www.mystimayhem.com

Mysti Mayhem (born Misty Dawn Naholnik on May 14, 1984) is a female American singer-songwriter and musician based in Durham, NC, and is the 13th artist to have the development of an album financed by pre-sales with the fan-funded music record label Sellaband. 532 fan-based contributions achieved the US$50,000 threshold required for production of her first solo album Diversity, released August 15, 2008. She combines use of the internet with new and traditional music production.

Her music career began informally at the age of 3 and development continued via her mother, the public school music program and private tutoring. Her formal career began through stage performances while in high school. In 2004 Mysti joined Spellbox and produced 4 albums until Spellbox disbanded in 2009. It was during this five-year period that involvement with the internet began to become prevalent in moving her career forward.

== Biography ==
Mysti Mayhem was born Misty Dawn Naholnik on May 14, 1984 in Pennsylvania, United States. Having artistic parents and with music being prevalent in the lives of her mother and grandmother, music was introduced into her life at the age of 2 or 3 when her mother encouraged her to sing. She began to sing before she learned to talk. At the age of 5 she began to play keyboards and by 9 or 10 began the guitar. This musical trend continued through her high school years and her ability matured during this time with the aid of private guitar lessons and through involvement in the school choir. Her high-school music activity included stage performances accompanying Mike Farris of the Screamin' Cheetah Wheelies and Damon johnson of Brother Cane.

== Career ==
After graduating from Honesdale High School in Honesdale, PA a new phase of her life began and in 2003 she relocated to Gainesville, FL. In January 2004 she joined with luthier Shawn (Mandocello) Spencer to form Spellbox. Owing to her energetic stage performances and demeanor she was described as "full of mayhem" which led to the adoption of a new stage name, Mysti Mayhem.

While in Gainesville she met Bo Diddley and he became her friend and mentor. He attended a birthday party in her honor. Later, Mysti became a neighbor of Bo Diddley and he provided her with private lessons in music and performing. She credits him with teaching her to "put the blues into music; to connect the emotions with the performance in a sincere way." They remained friends until his death in 2008.

Through the five years of activity with Spellbox she released 4 albums and supported this work with tours in the United States and online music sales. Two albums were produced in 2007 marking an especially active period for the duo. During this time frustrations with the traditional recording label system resulted in an attempt to reach out to Curb Records in Nashville, TN in which Mysti Mayhem gave a live performance of Time For a Change in the reception area of their office. This period marked a transition into a phase where online communities and internet marketing were used to complement traditional methods of career growth.

In 2006 Mysti Mayhem went on to join with the Sellaband label. In February 2008 she achieved success as the 13th artist on this label to reach the US$50,000 baseline for the production of an album, the equivalent of 5000 copies. 523 supporters invested in the development of the album with the potential for gaining a share in royalties during the five-year period after the album sales began. The album Diversity began sales on August 15, 2008.

Spellbox disbanded in 2009 and in that year Mysti Mayhem began collaboration with percussion artist Anatude (Ana Mitchell). Her collaboration was extended to include a guitarist, and she continues to perform both as a solo artist and within a group.

She was the winner of the 2013 open mic competition sponsored by Deep South Entertainment in Raleigh, NC, a year-long competition where performers vie for recording studio time. Following her win and studio session time at Two Egrets Media and Recording, February 2014 saw the global release of the single Time for a Change, a song inspired by her frustrations with an industry that produces music performers as marketed products rather than promoting true musicians and artists.

She credited her use of the internet to furthering her career's development and music production.

== Style ==
Mysti Mayhem is an acoustic guitarist playing both 6 and 12 string guitars. Her music includes various styles such as blues, country and rock.

== Influences ==
Mysti Mayhem cites her mother, Janis Joplin and Ani DiFranco as three of her major influences along with many of the people she performed with through her career.

== Discography ==
=== Spellbox ===
Egyptian Death March (2004)
Long Way To Rock (2006)
Believe (2007)
Misty Dawn (2007)

=== Mysti Mayhem ===
Diversity (2008)

Violin – Robert Britt
Drums – Cactus Moser
Cello – Brian Bromberg
Upright Bass – Bill Bussman
Mandocello – Mandocello (Shawn Spencer)
Guitar, Vocals – Mysti Mayhem

Produced by Mysti Mayhem, Cactus Moser of Highway 101, and Chris Stamey
Mixed by Chris Stamey at Modern Recording (Chapel Hill, NC, USA)
Mastered by Brent Lambert at Kitchen Mastering (Carrboro, NC, USA)
Recorded at Bardsong Studios (Truth or Consequences, NM, USA) and Modern Recording (Chapel Hill, NC, USA)

Time for a Change (single) (2014)

Produced by Mike Garrigan
Recorded at Two Egrets Media and Recording (Greensboro, NC, USA)

== Endorsements ==
The Epiphone Company officially endorsed Mysti Mayhem due to her use of Epiphone instruments. The company gave her one of their advanced acoustic/electric guitars as a gift in recognition.

== Reviews ==
Diversity received favorable review by Don Sechelski who labels the album a well-written, well-produced work, and one of the best he had heard that year.
