= The Charts (American group) =

American doo-wop group

The Charts were an American doo-wop group of the 1950s, most famous for their recording "Deserie".

The group formed as The Thrilltones in Harlem, New York, in 1956, and comprised teenagers Joe Grier (lead), Stephen Brown (first tenor), Glenmore Jackson (second tenor), Leroy Binns (baritone), and Ross Buford (bass). They acquired a manager, Les Cooper, who had previously been a member of various R&B groups, and who changed their name to The Charts.

They were signed to the Everlast label, owned by Bobby Robinson's brother Danny, who released their first single "Deserie" in May 1957. The song's authorship was credited to Cooper and Johnson, although singer Joe Grier later claimed that he had written the song along with the group's other material. The record was No. 3 on the national R&B charts, and was later featured on many compilations of doo-wop classics.

After a few more singles for Everlast, the original Charts disbanded in 1958 when Grier went into the service. On his return, he took up the saxophone, and featured on the 1962 instrumental hit by Les Cooper and his group the Soul Rockers, "Wiggle Wobble" (No. 22 pop, No. 12 R&B).

Brown and Binns kept the group's name going for several years with new members. They released an updated version of "Deserie" in 1967, retitled "Desiree", and continued touring and appearing at doowop revival concerts with various versions of The Charts until around 1983. Binns continued to perform with later versions of The Coasters and The Del Vikings.

"Deserie" was later recorded, as "Désiree", by Laura Nyro on her 1971 album Gonna Take a Miracle.

In 1985, the group was Grier, Alex Augustine, Mickey Collier, and Jim Moschella (former member of The Elegants). The group appeared on the PBS special Red, White, and Rock in 2002. The group was Grier, Binns, and two then-current members of the Del-Vikings, Dickie Harmon and Butch Phillips.

Leroy Binns died In January 2020.
