= Wiggle Wobble =

Single by Les Cooper & the Soul Rockers

from the album Wiggle Wobble Dance Party
- A-side: "Dig Yourself"
- Released: August 1962
- Genre: Soul
- Length: 2:04
- Label: Everlast
- Songwriter(s): Les Cooper
- Producer(s): Bobby Robinson, Danny Robinson

Les Cooper & the Soul Rockers singles chronology
"Wiggle Wobble" (1962)	"I Can Do the Soul Jerk" (1965)

"Wiggle Wobble" is an instrumental written by Les Cooper and performed by Cooper & the Soul Rockers. The single was produced by Bobby and Danny Robinson. It was featured on their 1963 album Wiggle Wobble Dance Party.

== Background ==
The sax player featured on the song was Joe Grier, originally with The Charts.

== Chart performance ==
It reached #12 on the U.S. R&B chart and #22 on the U.S. pop chart in 1962.

== Other versions ==
- Don Covay released a version of the song as a single in 1963, but it did not chart.
- Dee Dee Sharp released a version of the song on her 1963 album All the Hits (Volume II).
- The Surfaris released a version of the song on their 1963 album Wipe Out.
- King Curtis released a version of the song on his 1964 album Soul Serenade.
- Sandy Nelson released a version of the song on his 1995 compilation album Rock 'N' Roll Drum Beat.
