= Random Hero =

Random Hero may refer to:

- Random Hero (band), an American rock band formed in Denver, Colorado in 2005
- Ryan Dunn or Random Hero, American reality television personality and daredevil
