= Cool Papa =

Cool Papa is a nickname. Notable people who have used the nickname include:

- Cool Papa Bell (1903–1991), American center fielder in Negro league baseball
- Haskell Sadler (1935–1994), American blues singer, songwriter, and guitarist
- John T. Smith (blues musician) (1896–1940), American Texas blues musician
- Clarence "Cool Papa" Charleston, character on the TV series I'll Fly Away
