= Jim Pash =

James Edward Pash (December 23, 1948 – April 29, 2005) was an American musician and recording artist. Pash was originally the surf saxophonist for The Surfaris, an early California surf rock group in the 1960s, known for the 1963 instrumental hit "Wipe Out". Later in life, Pash dedicated his time to his Harp of David project, a recreation of the original harp and song melodies used by King David of the Bible.

He died on April 29, 2005, in Yucca Valley, San Bernardino County, California, from congestive heart failure while awaiting a liver transplant. A United States Army veteran who served in the Vietnam War, Pash is buried at Riverside National Cemetery in Riverside, California.
