= Buster Brown (musician) =

American singer (1911–1976)

- Born: August 15, 1911; Newton, Georgia, U.S.
- Died: January 31, 1976 (aged 64) Brooklyn, New York City, U.S.
- Genres: Blues, R&B
- Occupation: Singer
- Years active: 1943–1976
- Labels: Fire, Checker

Buster Brown (August 15, 1911 – January 31, 1976) was an American blues and R&B singer best known for his hit, "Fannie Mae".

== Biography ==
Brown was born in Cordele, Georgia. In the 1930s and 1940s he played harmonica at local clubs and made a few non-commercial recordings. These included "War Song" and "I'm Gonna Make You Happy" (1943), which were recorded when he played at the folk festival at Fort Valley (Georgia) State Teachers College, for the Library of Congress' Folk Music Archive.

Brown moved to New York in 1956, where he was discovered by Fire Records owner Bobby Robinson. In 1959, at almost 50 years of age, Brown recorded the rustic blues, "Fannie Mae", which featured Brown's harmonica playing and whoops, which went to no. 38 in the US Top 40, and to no. 1 on the R&B chart in April 1960. His remake of Louis Jordan's "Is You Is or Is You Ain't My Baby" reached no. 81 on the pop chart later in 1960, but did not make the R&B chart. "Sugar Babe" was his only other hit, in 1962, reaching no. 19 on the R&B chart and no. 99 on the pop chart.

In later years he recorded for Checker Records and for numerous small record labels. He also co-wrote the song "Doctor Brown" with J. T. Brown, which was later covered by Fleetwood Mac on their 1968 album, Mr. Wonderful.

He enjoyed further attention in 1973 when his song "Fannie Mae" was included in the film American Graffiti and its accompanying soundtrack album.

== Death ==
Brown died in Brooklyn, New York City in 1976, at the age of 64.

It is often erroneously cited that Brown's real name was "Wayman Glasco" – however, that was Brown's manager who, after his death, bought all of Brown's publishing – thus unintentionally creating the confusion. Though likely a nickname, or alias, Buster Brown may have been his birth name.

== Discography ==
=== Studio album ===
- New King of the Blues (Fire, 1961)

=== Compilations ===
- Get Down With Buster Brown (Souffle, 1973) - reissue of the Fire lp.
- Raise a Ruckus Tonight (DJM, 1976)
- Toughest Terry & Baddest Brown (Sundown, 1986) – with Sonny Terry
- Good News (Charly, 1989)
- The Very Best of Buster Brown (Collectables, 1999)
