= Fire Records =

American record label

Fire Records was an American independent record label, set up in 1959 by Bobby Robinson. Amongst others, it released records by Lightnin' Hopkins, Elmore James, Buster Brown and Arthur Crudup. At one point it was thought Fire had issued the last commercial 78 rpm disc in the United States. Although this has been disproven, the label is still known for their late-issue 78s.

== Selected discography ==
- 1000 – Tarheel Slim and Little Ann – "It's Too Late" (1959)
- 1008 – Buster Brown – "Fannie Mae" (1959)
- 1011 – Elmore James – "Bobby's Rock" / "Make My Dreams Come True" (Issued 1960 – A-side is a 1959 recording but B-side is a 1953 Flair recording brought in by Robinson)
- 1016 – Elmore James – "The Sky Is Crying" (1960, reissued with different B-side in the mid-1960s on Flashback)
- 1024 – Elmore James – "I'm Worried" (1960)
- 504 – Elmore James – "Shake Your Moneymaker" (1961)
- 1034 – Lightnin' Hopkins – Mojo Hand (1962) – label states artist as "Lightin'" Hopkins
- 1501 – Arthur Crudup – "Mean Old Frisco" (1962)
- 1503 – Elmore James – "Stranger Blues" (1962)

== See also ==
- Fire Records artists with Wikipedia pages
