= Bobby Robinson (music producer) =

American record producer and songwriter (1917–2011)

- Robinson in 1977

Background information
- Born: Morgan Clyde Robinson; April 16, 1917; Union, South Carolina, U.S.
- Died: January 7, 2011 (aged 93) New York City, U.S.
- Genres: Blues; rhythm and blues; hip-hop
- Occupations: Record producer; music executive
- Years active: 1940s–1980s
- Labels: Red Robin; Fury; Fire; Enjoy; Sue

Morgan Clyde "Bobby" Robinson (April 16, 1917 – January 7, 2011) was an American independent record producer and songwriter in New York City, most active from the 1950s through the mid-1980s.

Robinson produced hits by Wilbert Harrison, the Shirelles, Dave "Baby" Cortez, Elmore James, Lee Dorsey, Gladys Knight & The Pips, King Curtis, Spoonie Gee, Grandmaster Flash & the Furious Five, Doug E. Fresh, and Treacherous Three. He founded or co-founded Red Robin Records, Sue Records, Whirlin' Disc Records, Fury Records, Fire Records and Enjoy Records.

== Biography ==
Born in Union, South Carolina, Robinson served in the US Army in World War II. After the war, Robinson moved to New York City and opened "Bobby's Record Shop" (later "Bobby's Happy House") in 1946. There were only a few Black-owned businesses on 125th Street in Harlem during this period. Robinson's record shop became one of them. Located on the corner of 125th St. and Frederick Douglass Boulevard. His shop remained open until January 21, 2008, only being forced to close because the landlord planned to raze the building.

Robinson's store became a focal point for the independent record producers establishing themselves in New York. During this time, Robinson spent time assisting Ahmet Ertegun at Atlantic Records. He produced his first recording in 1951, "Bobby's Boogie" by saxophonist Morris Lane and his band. Robinson normally specialised in recording vocal groups including the Mello-Moods, the Rainbows, the Vocaleers and the Du Droppers. He also recorded blues performers such as Sonny Terry and Brownie McGhee

Robinson's first major success was "Shake Baby Shake" by Champion Jack Dupree in 1953. The record was released on Red Robin Records, which Robinson had established the previous year. The label was originally named Robin Records, but legal threats forced him to change it.

Having enjoyed healthy local sales with doo-wop and blues discs in the early-to-mid-1950s, Robinson established several more record labels, some in partnership with his brother, Danny Robinson. Among them were Whirlin' Disc Records in 1956, Fury Records and Everlast Records in 1957, Sue Records with Juggy Murray in 1957, Fire Records in 1959, and Enjoy Records in 1962. He launched Fire and Fury as vehicles for rhythm and blues and rock and roll artists, most of which were produced by him in New York City, but some were produced by others and acquired by him in various Southern cities.

Robinson produced top-selling records by Wilbert Harrison, The Shirelles, Lee Dorsey, and Dave "Baby" Cortez, many of whom were signed to the label by A&R man Marshall Sehorn. One of his earliest hits was Harrison's "Kansas City", over which he faced legal action brought by Herman Lubinsky of Savoy Records, who claimed he had Harrison under contract. Robinson produced Gladys Knight & the Pips' first hit, "Every Beat of My Heart" (after he signed them to Fury; the original version was recorded in Atlanta, issued locally on Huntom and leased to Vee Jay, who had the bigger hit). Robinson produced several Elmore James records as well as recordings by Lightnin' Hopkins, Arthur Crudup, and Buster Brown. King Curtis's "Soul Twist" was the first release of his Enjoy label in 1962, and over twenty years later, he released the hit, "I’m The Packman (Eat Everything I Can)" by The Packman, on the same label. The rights to Robinson's recordings on Fire and Fury were sold to Bell Records in 1965.

Compilation album producer Diana Reid Haig wrote:

The common thread that connected all of Robinson's various record labels was his uncanny ability to bring out the best in his artists. While most producers at that time attempted to soften the edges of rhythm & blues singers in hopes of appealing to the pop market, Robinson delighted in capturing raw-edged artists like Elmore James and Buster Brown just as they were.

In the 1970s, Robinson produced some of the first hip-hop music records for his "Enjoy" label . In 1979, he recorded Grandmaster Flash & the Furious Five's first record, "Superrappin'", an innovative record which was influential in hip-hop's early years. A local hit in New York, the record failed to hit nationwide. Robinson then produced records by Pumpkin and Friends, the Funky Four Plus One More, Spoonie Gee (Robinson's nephew), and Kool Moe Dee with the Treacherous Three. He produced Doug E. Fresh's "Just Having Fun (Do The Beatbox)", which introduced beatboxing to the record-buying public.

Robinson died on January 7, 2011, at the age of 93, after a period of declining health.

== Discography ==
=== Selected production credits ===
- "Kansas City" by Wilbert Harrison, 1959
- "Dedicated to the One I Love" by The Shirelles, 1959
- "The Happy Organ" by Dave "Baby" Cortez, 1959
- "Fannie Mae" by Buster Brown, 1959
- "You Don't Have to Go" by Sam Myers, 1960
- "The Sky Is Crying" by Elmore James, 1960
- "Ya Ya" by Lee Dorsey, 1961
- "Tossin' and Turnin'" by Bobby Lewis, 1961
- "Every Beat of My Heart" by Gladys Knight & the Pips, 1961
- "Soul Twist" by King Curtis, 1962
- "Wiggle Wobble" by Les Cooper, 1962
- "Hot Potato" by Rinkydinks, 1963, became first title theme for Soul Train
- "Love Rap" by Spoonie Gee, 1980
- "Superappin" by Grandmaster Flash & The Furious Five, 1979
- "Rappin' And Rocking The House" by the Funky Four Plus One More, 1979 (at over fifteen minutes, one of the longest rap records of its time)
- "Rockin' It" by The Fearless Four, 1982
- several hits by Kool Moe Dee with the Treacherous Three ("The New Rap Language", "Feel The Heartbeat", "At The Party" and "Body Rock")

=== Fire 7" discography ===
- 1000 – Tarheel Slim And Little Ann – It's Too Late / Don't Ever Leave Me
- 1001 – Earl Lewis & The Channels – The Girl Next Door / My Heart Is Sad
- 1002 – Mary Ann Fisher – Wild As You Can Be / Put On My Shoes
- 1003 – Willis Jackson Band – Good To The Bone / Making It
- 1004 – ?
- 1005 – Vinnie & Kenny – Schooltime / Who (Is The Girl)
- 1006 – Wild Jimmy Spurill – Hard Grind / Kansas City March
- 1007 – Rockin' B Bradley – Lookout / I Have News For You
- 1008 – Buster Brown – Fannie Mae / Lost In A Dream
- 1009 – Tarheel Slim & Little Ann – Much Too Late / Lock Me In Your Heart
- 1010 – May Ann Fisher – As Wild As You Can Be / Only Yesterday
- 1011 – Elmore James And His Broomdusters – Make My Dreams Come True / Bobby's Rock
- 1012 – The Rainbows – Mary Lee / Evening
- 1013 – Little Bobby Roach – Mush / More Mush
- 1014 – Bobby Marchan & The Tick Tocks – Shoppin' And Accusin' / This Is The Life
- 1015 – Johnny Acey – Why / Please Don't Go Back (To Baltimore)
- 1016 – Elmo James And His Broomdusters – The Sky Is Crying / Held My Baby Last Night
- 1017 – Tarheel Slim & Little Ann – Can't Stay Away Part 1 / Part 2
- 1018 – Paul Perryman – Look At My Baby / Keep A'Calling
- 1019 – Riff Ruffin – All My Life / Gravy Train
- 1020 – Buster Brown – The Madison Shuffle / John Henry (The Steel Driving Man)
- 1021 – Tarheel Slim & Little Ann – Forever I'll Be Yours / Anything For You
- 1022 – Bobby Marchan – There's Something On Your Mind Part 1 / Part 2
- 1023 – Buster Brown – Is You Is Or Is You Ain't My Baby / Don't Dog Your Woman
- 1024 – Elmore James – Rollin' And Tumblin' / I'm Worried
- 1025 – Billy Lewis – Tell All The World About You /Heart Trouble
- 1026 – The Gay Poppers – I Want To Know / I've Got It
- 1027 – Bobby Marchan – Booty Green / It Hurts Me To My Heart
- 1028 – Bobby Marchan – You're Still My Baby Part 1 / Part 2
- 1029 – The Upsetters – Jaywalkin' / Steppin' Out
- 1030 – Tarheel Slim & Little Ann – Security / Bless You My Darling
- 1031 – Elmo James – Done Somebody Wrong / Fine Little Mama
- 1032 – Buster Brown – Doctor Brown / Sincerely
- 1033 – Mighty Joe Young – Empty Arms / Why Baby
- 1034 – Lightin' Hopkins – Mojo Hand / Glory Be
- 1035 – Bobby Marchan – All In My Mind / I Miss You So
- 1036 – Johnny Chef – Can't Stop Moving / Baby Please Come Back
- 1037 – Bobby Marchan – What You Don't Know Don't Hurt You / I Need Someone (I Need You)
- 1038 – The Tellers – I Wanna Run To You / Tears Fell From My Eyes
- 1039 – The Gay Poppers – Please Mr Cupid / You Got Me Uptight
- 1040 – Buster Brown – Blues When It Rains / Good News
- 500 – Willie Bradford – So Long / Wanna Be Loved
- 501 – Dr Horse – I'm Tired Of It / Think I Know
- 502 – Otis Scott – New Kind Of Love / ?
- 503 – Slim And Ann, Orchestra Conducted By Larry Lucie – It's A Sin / You're Gonna' Reap (Everything You Sow)
- 504 – Elmore James – Look on Yonder Wall / Shake Your Moneymaker
- 505 – Chuck Bradford – You're Gonna Miss Me / Say It Was A Dream
- 506 – Tarheel Slim & Little Ann – Forever I'll Be Yours / Can't Stay Away From You
- 507 – Buster Brown – I'm Going Out But I'll Be Back / Sugar Babe
- 508 – Don Gardner & Dee Dee Ford – I Need Your Lovin' / Tell Me
- 509 – ?
- 510 – Bobby Marchan – Yes It's Written All Over Your Face / Look At My Heart
- 511 – Chuck Bradford – You Can't Hurt Me Anymore / Wherever You Are
- 512 – Linda Martell & The Anglos – A Little Tear / The Things I Do For You
- 513 – Don Gardner & Dee Dee Ford – Don't You Worry / I'm Coming Home To Stay
- 514 – Dr Horse – Jack The Cat Was Clean / Salt Pork West Va
- 515 – ?
- 516 – Buster Brown – Raise A Ruckus Tonight / Gonna Love My Baby
- 517 – Don Gardner & Dee Dee Ford – Lead Me On / Tcb (Taking Care Of Business)
- 1501 – Arthur Crudup – Rock Me Mama / Mean Ole Frisco
- 1502 – Arthur Crudup – Katie Mae / Dig Myself A Hole
- 1503 – Elmore James – Strangerblues / Anna Lee
- 2020 – Elmore James – Pickin' The Blues / It Hurts Me To
- 2021 – Buster Brown – Sugar Babe / Don't Dog Your Woman
- 2022 – Larry Dale – Rock A While / The Things I Used To Do
- 5001 – Darwin Nelson – Mary Sue / Good Gosh Gerty – 1959

=== Fire LP discography ===
- FLP-100 – Here Are The Hits! – Various Artists [1959] Original cover has photograph of teenagers dancing. Record label is white with red printing. Deserie – Charts/Mary Lee – Rainbows/Dear One -Scarlets/I've Lost – Scarlets/I – Velvets/I Cried – Velvets//My Love Will Never Die – Channels/Bye Bye Baby – Channels/Evening – Rainbows/Oh Gee Oh Gosh – Kodaks/I'm So Happy – Teen Chords/Lydia – Teen Chords
- FLP-100 – Memory Lane – Various Artists [1959] Second cover called "Memory Lane, Hits by the Original Groups", there is no picture. Record label is red with black printing. Deserie -Charts/Mary Lee – Rainbows/Dear One -Scarlets/I've Lost – Scarlets/I – Velvets/I Cried – Velvets//My Love Will Never Die – Channels/Bye Bye Baby – Channels/Evening – Rainbows/Oh Gee Oh Gosh – Kodaks/I'm So Happy – Teen Chords/Lydia – Teen Chords
- FLP-101 – Buster Brown New King Of The Blues – Buster Brown [1960] Label is white with red printing. FLP-101 in trail off area of LP. Fannie Mae/John Henry/Madison/St. Louis Blues/When Things Go Wrong/Lost In A Dream//Is You Is Or Is You Ain't/Don't Dog Your Woman/Blue Berry Hill/Sincerely/I'm Goin' But I'll Be Back
- FLP-102 – Buster Brown New King Of The Blues – Buster Brown [1960] Cover is blue with drawing of Buster Brown, label is red with black printing. FLP-101 in trail off area of LP even though the cover and label say FLP-102. Fannie Mae/John Henry/Madison/St. Louis Blues/When Things Go Wrong/Lost In A Dream//Is You Is Or Is You Ain't/Don't Dog Your Woman/Blue Berry Hill/Sincerely/I'm Goin' But I'll Be Back
- FLP-103 – Mean Ol' Frisco – Arthur "Big Boy" Crudup [1960] Label is red with black printing. Mean Ole Frisco/Look On Yonder Wall/That's Alright/Ethel Mae/Too Much Competition/Standing At My Window//Rock Me Mama/Greyhound Bus/Coal Black Mare/Katie Mae/Dig Myself A Hole/So Glad You're Mine
- FLP-104 – Mojo Hand – Lightnin' Hopkins [1962] Label is red with black print. Mojo Hand/Coffee For Mama/Awful Dream/Black Mare Trot/Have You Ever Loved A Woman//Glory Bee/Sometimes She Will/Shine On Moon!/Santa
- FLP-105 – I Need Your Lovin' – Don Gardner/Dee Dee Ford [1962] Need Your Lovin'/Now It's Too Late/Nobody But You/Make The Girl Love Me/You Said/Tell Me//I Need You/I'm Coming Home To Stay/What A Thrill/Honey Sweet/Don't You Worry

=== Fury 7" discography ===
- 1000 – Lewis Lymon & The Teenchords – I'm So Happy (Tra La La La La La) / Lydia
- 1001 – The Miracles – Your Love (Is All I Need) / I Love You So
- 1002 – Hal Paige & The Whalers – Don't Have To Cry No More / Pour The Corn
- 1003 – Lewis Lymon & The Teenchords – Honey Honey (You Don't Know) / Please Tell The Angels
- 1004 – Little Bobby Rivera & The Hemlocks – Cora Lee / Joys Of Love
- 1005 – The Federals – While Our Hearts Are Young / You're The One I Love
- 1006 – Lewis Lymon & The Teenchords – I'm Not Too Young To Fall In Love / Falling In Love
- 1007 – The Kodaks With Pearl McKinnon – Teenager's Dream / Little Boy And Girl
- 1008 – Bobby & Buddy – What's The Word – Thunderbird / I Cried
- 1009 – The Federals – Dear Loraine / She's My Girl
- 1010 – The Emotions – Candlelight / It's Love
- 1011 – The Du Mauriers – All Night Long / Baby I Love You
- 1012 – The Velvets – Dance Honey Dance / I – I – I (Love You So – So – So)
- 1013 – The Duals – Wait Up Baby / Forever And Ever
- 1014 – Sherman & Darts – Remember (It's Only You And I) / Rockin' At Midnight
- 1015 – The Kodoks Featuring Pearl McKinnion – Oh Gee, Oh Gosh / Make Believe World
- 1016 – Tarheel Slim – Number 9 Train / Wildcat Trainer
- 1017 – The Southwinds – Build Me A Cabin / They Call Me Crazy
- 1018 – Curtis Carrington – I'm Gonna Catch You / You Are My Sunshine
- 1019 – The Kodaks – Kingless Castle / My Baby And Me
- 1020 – The Kodaks – Run Around Baby / Guardian Angel
- 1021 – The Channels – My Love Will Never Die / Bye Bye Baby
- 1022 – The Vibra-Harps – The Only Love Of Mine / Be My Dancing Partner
- 1023 – Wilbert Harrison – Kansas City / Listen My Darling
- 1024 – Hal Paige & The Whalers – Going Back To My Home Town / After Hours Blues
- 1025 – Gino – Catastrophe / Right From The Start
- 1026 – The 3 Emotions – Night We Met / The Girl I Left Behind
- 1027 – Wilbert Harrison – Cheating Baby / Don't Wreck My Life
- 1028 – Wilbert Harrison – 1960 / Goodbye Kansas City
- 1029 – The Premiers – I Pray / Pigtails Eyes Are Blue
- 1030 – June Bateman – Believe Me Darling / Come On Little Boy
- 1031 – Wilbert Harrison – C C Rider / Why Did You Leave
- 1032 – Clarence "Junior" Lewis – Cupid's Little Helper / Half A Heart
- 1033 – Gil Hamilton – Much Obliged / Pretty Baby
- 1034 – The Starlites – Valarie / Way Up In The Sky
- 1035 – Sammy Myers – You Don't Have To Go / Sad Sad Lonesome Day
- 1036 – The Scarlets – Truly Yours / East Of The Sun
- 1037 – Wilbert Harrison – Since I Fell For You / Little School Girl
- 1038 – Delmar – Depending On You / Lizzie Mae
- 1039 – Little Junior Lewis – Come On Back Where You Belong / And That's All I Need
- 1040 – Little Junior – Can She Give Me Fever / Your Heart Must Be Made Of Stone
- 1041 – Wilbert Harrison – The Horse / Da-De-Ya-Da (Anything For You)
- 1042 – Helen Bryant – That's A Promise / I've Learned My Lesson
- 1043 – Riff Ruffin – Hucklebuck Scratch / Dig That Rock & Roll
- 1044 – Buddy Skipper – The Clock / No More Doggin'
- 1045 – The Starlites – Ain't Cha' Ever Coming Home / Silver Lining
- 1046 – Ike Nesbit – I Want You / I'm Lonely
- 1047 – Wilbert Harrison – Happy In Love / Calypso Dance
- 1048 – Pearl & The Deltars – Teenage Dream / Dance Dance Dance
- 1049 – Charles Baker – Love Will Make You / Darling Here You Are
- 1050 – Gladys Knight & The Pips – Every Beat Of My Heart / Room In Your Heart
- 1051 – Buddy Skipper – Make Believe Baby / Back On The Beach Again
- 1052 – Gladys Knight & The Pips – Guess Who / Stop Running Around
- 1053 – Lee Dorsey – Ya Ya / Give Me You
- 1054 – Gladys Knight & The Pips – Letter Full Of Tears / You Broke Your Promise
- 1055 – Wilbert Harrison – Drafted / My Heart Is Yours
- 1056 – Lee Dorsey – Do-Re-Mi / People Gonna Talk
- 1057 – Jackie & The Starlites – I Found Out Too Late / I'm Coming Home
- 1058 – Barry & The Tots – Christmas Each Day Of The Year / I'm A Happy Little Christmas Tree
- 1059 – Wilbert Harrison – Let's Stick Together / Kansa City Twist
- 1060 – Little Joe Cook – This I Know / These Lonely Tears
- 1061 – Lee Dorsey – Eenie Meenie Miny Moe / Behind The 8 Ball
- 1062 – Buddy Skipper – Don't Be A Shame / Baby Please
- 1063 – Wilbert Harrison – Let's Stick Together / My Heart Is Yours
- 1064 – Gladys Knight & The Pips – Operator / I'll Trust In You
- 1065 – ?
- 1066 – Lee Dorsey – You Are My Sunshine / Give Me Your Love
- 1067 – The Pips – Darling / Linda
- 1068 – Slim & Little Ann – Send Me The Pillow You Dream On / I Love You Because
- 1069 – Tyron Rowe – Mama Don't Allow / I'm A Go'fer
- 1070 – Jimmy Ricks – I Wonder / Let Me Down Easy
- 1071 – The Channels – My Love Will Never Die / Bye Bye Baby
- 1072 – ?
- 1073 – Gladys Knight – Come See About / I Want That Kind Of Love
- 1074 – Lee Dorsey – Hoodlum Joe / When I Met My Baby
- 5000 – Billy Habric – Human / Talk To Me Baby
- 5001 – Wilbert Harrison – (If Women Are) Trouble / Let's Have Some Fun
- 5002 – Willie Hightower – If I Had A Hammer / So Tired
- 5003 – Man U Huffman – Things Go Better With You / School Boy In Love
- 5004 – Willie Hightower – Let's Walk Together / I Love You
- 5005 – Billy Hambrick – You're A Sweetheart / Flaming Mamie
- 5006 – Billy Hambre – This Is My Prayer / Everybody Needs Love
- 5050 – Johnny Jones – Tennessee Waltz / I Find No Fault
- 5051 – Ricky Lewis – Cupis / Somebody's Gonna Want Me
- 5052 – Joe Haywood – Ghost Of A Love / Debt Of Love

=== Fury LP discography ===
- FULP-1001 – Letter Full Of Tears – Gladys Knight & Pips [Unissued?] The trail off wax of FULP-1003 also has FLP-1001 which is scratched out. This would indicate that the Gladys Knight album was intended to be Fury 1001.
- FULP-1002 – Ya Ya – Lee Dorsey [1962] Yellow label with black printing. Ya Ya/Give Me You/Do-Re-Me/People Gonna Talk/Chin Chin/Mess Around//Eenie Meenie Mini Mo/One And One/Yum Yum/Ixie Dixie Pixie Pie/Behind The Eight-Ball
- FULP-1003 – Letter Full Of Tears – Gladys Knight & Pips [1962] The label is yellow with black printing. Trail off wax contains FU-LP-1003 and FLP 1001 which is scratched out. Letter Full Of Tears/You Broke Your Promise/Operator/I'll Trust In You/Morning Noon And Night/I Can't Stand By//Every Beat Of My Heart/Room In Your Heart/Guess Who/Stop Running Around/What Shall I Do?

=== Enjoy 7" discography ===
- 1000 – King Curtis – Soul Twist / Twisting Time
- 1001 – King Curtis – Wobble Twist / Twisting With The King
- 1002 – Chuck Paulin – Everybody's Talking / ?
- 1003 – Janet Calloway & Chuck Paulin – Lover's Prayer / Mercy Mercy
- 1003 – Janet Calloway – Lovers Prayer / Bank Of Love (note diff. b-side and no mention of Paulin)
- 1004 – Jay Cee's – Just Say The Word / The Waddle
- 1005 – Titus Turner – People Sure Act Funny / My Darkest Hour
- 1006 – ?
- 1007 – Betty Boothe – I'm The One Who Needs You / Just A Little Bit Of True Love
- 1008 – Noble Watts – Jookin / Noble Watts And June Bateman – What Ya Gonna Do
- 1009 – The Naturals – Swingin' Low / Lenny Goofed
- 1010 – Rinkydinks – Hot Potato Part 1 / Part 2
- 1011 – Les & Gloria – Twisting One More Time / Peter Piper
- 1012 – Ti Mattison – Don't Make Me Cry / Please Don't
- 1013 – The Cross Jordan Singers – Jesus Died / Troubled No More
- 1014 – Mary B – Ain't Nobody's Business / Cut It Out
- 1015 – Titus Turner – Soulville / My Darkest Hour
- 1016 – Jimmy Armstrong – Count The Tears / I'm Going To Lock My Heart
- 2001 – Channels – Sad Song / My Love
- 2002 – Johnny Wilson – Please Be Fair / You're Still My Baby
- 2003 – The Hootenaires – Baby, Baby (I Love You) / Bill Bailey (Come On Home)
- 2004 – Barry & The Tots – I'm A Happy Little Christmas Tree / Christmas Each Day Of The Year
- 2005 – Charlie Lucas – Walkin' / Jump For Joy
- 2006 – Wild Jimmy Spruill – Cut And Dried / The Rooster
- 2007 – Riff Ruffin – Plain English / Hoop And Holler
- 2008 – Ronnie & The Manhattans – Come On Back / Long Time No See
- 2009 – Louis Jones – I Believe In My Soul / Hurry Baby
- 2010 – Titus Turner – Bow Wow / I Love You Baby
- 2011 – Little Joe & The Thrillers – Peanuts And Popcorn / Chicken Little Boo Boo
- 2012 – Gladys Knight & The Pips – What Shall I Do / Love Call
- 2013 – Joe Haywood – Warm And Tender Love / I Would If I Could
- 2014 – Tarheel Slim & Little Ann – Got To Keep On Lovin' You / You Make Me Feel So Good
- 2015 – Elmore James – It Hurts Me Too / Bleeding Heart
- 2015 – Elmore James – It Hurts Me Too / Pickin' The Blues
- 2016 – Joe Haywood – When You Look In The Mirror (You're Looking At The One You Love) / Talk To Me Baby (Put Some Sugar In My Ear)
- 2017 – Jay Dee Bryant – You're Hurting Me / Get It
- 2018 – Riff Ruffin – Home Cookin / Hot Waffles
- 2019 – Willie Hightower – Too Late / What Am I Living For
- 2020 – Elmore James – Mean Mistreatin' Mama / Bleeding Heart
- 2021 – Bobby Porter – Foxy Devil / Searching For Love
- 2022 – Elmore James – Look On Yonder Wall / Shake Your Moneymaker
- 2023 – Sammy Taylor – Ain't That Some Shame / Next In Line
- 2024 – Les Cooper – Owee Baby / Let's Do The Boston Monkey
- 2025 – Ster-Phonics – Roamin' Heart
- 2026 – ?
- 2027 – Elmore James – Dust My Broom / Everyday I Have The Blues
- 2028 – Sammy Taylor – Don't Lie / Your Precious Love
- 5000 – Rocky O'Neal – Here I Go / Where Am I Going Wrong
- 5001 – Ricky Lewis – Welcome Home / Somebody's Gonna Want Me
- 5050 – Ricky Lewis – Cupid / Somebody's Gonna Want Me
- 6009 – Grandmaster Flash & The Furious Five / Super Rappin' No. 2 / Super Rappin' Theme
- 6016 – Treacherous Three / Feel The Heartbeat (Have Fun)

=== Enjoy label – 12" Discography ===
- 6000 – Funky Four Plus One More – Rappin' And Rocking The House (12")
- 6001 – Grandmaster Flash & The Furious Five – Superappin' (12")
- ER-6002 – Spoonie Gee & The Treacherous Three – The New Rap Language / Love Rap (12")
- ER-6006 – Kool Kyle The Starchild – Do You Like That Funky Beat (Ahh Beat Beat) (12")
- ER-6007 – Treacherous Three – The Body Rock (12")
- ER-6008 – Treacherous Three – At The Party (12")
- ER-6010 – Disco Four – Move To The Groove (12")
- ER-6011 – Grandmaster Flash & The Furious Five – Super Rappin' No.2 (12")
- ER-6012 – Doctor Ice – Calling Doctor Ice (12")
- ER-6013 – Treacherous Three – Feel The Heartbeat (12")
- ER-6014 – Kool Kyle The Starchild – It's Rockin Time (12")
- ER-6017 – Disco Four – Do It, Do It (12")
- ER-6018 – Treacherous Three – Put The Boogie In Your Body (12")
- ER-6021 – Midnight Blue – Enjoy With Me (12")
- ER-6022 – Spanish Fly & The Terrible Two – Spanglish (12")
- ER-6023 – Higher Ground – Shake 'Em Up (12")
- ER-6023 – Higher Ground – Shake 'Em Up (12")
- EN-1163 – The Packman – I'm The Packman (Eat Everything I Can) (12")
- EN-1163 / EN-1164 – The Packman – I'm The Packman (Eat Everything I Can) (12", Promo)
- ER-6024 – The Fearless Four – It's Magic (12")
- ER-6024 – The Fearless Four – It's Magic (12", RE)
- ER-6025 – Silver Star – Eei Eei O (12")
- ER-6026 – Disco Four – Country Rock And Rap (12")
- ER-6028 – The Fearless Four – Rockin' It (12")
- ER-6029 – Masterdon Committee – Gonna' Get You Hot (12")
- ER-6031 – The Packman – I'm The Packman (Eat Everything I Can) (12")
- EN-6032 – Masterdon Committee – Funk Box Party (12")
- EN-6033 – Masterdon Committee – Musicgram (12")
- ER-6034 – The Source – The Ghetto (12")
- ER-6035 – Doug E. Fresh – Just Having Fun (Do The Beat Box) (12")
- EN-6036 – Spoonie Gee – New Love Rap (12")
- EN-6037 – Crazy Eddie (3) & Jazaq – Come On Party People (Lets Ge Down) (12")
- EN-6038 – New York City Trooper – Here We Go (12")
- EN-6039 – Ninga – Crack Attack (12")
- EN-6040 – DLB (The Microphone Wizard) – Magic (12")
- EN-6044 – Masterdon – I Paid The Cost To Be The Boss (12")
- ER-6041 – The Deuce II – Are You Ready (For The Big Throwdown) (12")

=== Enjoy LP discography ===
- ENLP-2001 – Soul Twist – King Curtis [1962] Label is gold with blue printing. Soul Twist/Twisting Time/What'd I Say/I Know/Sack O' Woe Twist/Camp Meetin'//Wobble Twist/Irresistible You/Big Dipper/Twisting With The King/Midnight Blue

=== Everlast LP discography ===
- ELP-201 – Our Best To You – Various Artists [1960] Label is orange with black printing. Deserie – Charts/Zoop – Charts/Why Do You Cry – Charts/Dance Girl – Charts/You're The Reason – Charts/I've Been Wondering – Charts//I Want To Know – Ladders/Counting The Stars – Ladders /My Love Has Gone – Ladders /Lorraine – Harmonaires/Come Back – Harmonaires/Baby – Bop-Chords
- ELP-202 – Wiggle Wobble – Les Cooper and the Soul Rockers [1963] Label is white and orange with black printing. Popeye Dance/Wiggle Wobble No. 2/Jungle Pony/Dig Yourself/Shimmy Rock/Wiggle Wobble//The Monkey/Hippity Hop/Wobble Party/Twistin' One More Time/Bossa Nova Dance/At The Party

=== Front Page 7" discography ===
- 1000 – Joe Haywood – I'm Walkin' / Strong Feelin'
- 1001 – The Victones – I Need You So / My Baby Changes
- 1002 – Jim And Lee – Adam And Eve / I'll Never Change
- 1003 – Joe Haywood – I Cross My Heart And Hope To Die / In Your Heart You Know I Love You
- 2301 – Lee Moses – Time And Place / I Can't Take No Chances
- 2302 – The Victones- Somebody Really Loves You / Two Sides To Love

== Bibliography ==
- Gillett, Charlie. The Sound of the City: The Rise of Rock and Roll (1970, several later editions)
- Wilmer, Val. Bobby Robinson: Legend of the Back Streets. Melody Maker. November 18, 1978, pp. 47–48, 56
