= Gene "Birdlegg" Pittman =

American singer

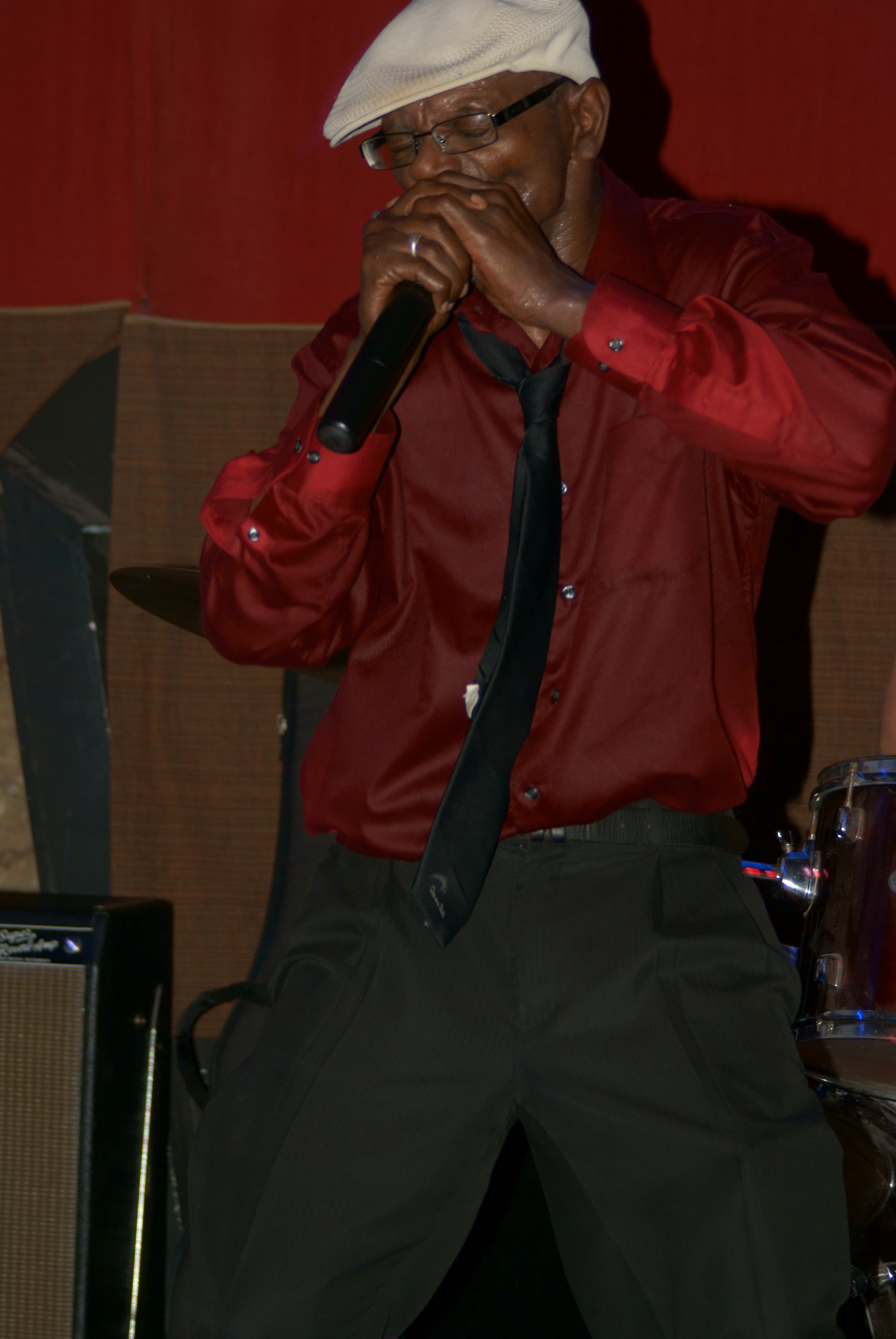
- Birdlegg and the Tight Fit Bluesband in 2012

Background information
- Born: Eugene P. Pittman; May 10, 1947 (age 79); Harrisburg, Pennsylvania, United States
- Genres: Blues
- Occupations: Harmonicist, singer, songwriter
- Instruments: Harmonica, human voice
- Years active: 1977–present

Eugene P. Pittman (born May 10, 1947), better known as Gene "Birdlegg" Pittman, is an American blues harmonicist, singer and songwriter. He was inspired by the harmonica playing and styling of Sonny Boy Williamson II and Sonny Terry, and started playing the harmonica in 1974, turning fully professional three years later. His own style encompasses country blues, urban blues, funk and rock and roll. He has released three albums to date.

== Life and career ==
Pittman was born in Harrisburg, Pennsylvania, United States. As a child he owned a harmonica, and was encouraged by the blues musicianship of his paternal grandfather, who played National steel guitar and had toured across the States. He watched Tina Turner in concert in Harrisburg when he was 16, then after high school he waited almost a decade before attending college at then-named Shippensburg State College. The academic life did not suit him, and on impulse Pittman bought a harmonica at the age of 26, despite having had no formal musical tuition. He relocated to New York, and his interest in the musical instrument, and the blues in general, started to grow. After two years had passed, and noting that both Taj Mahal and John Lee Hooker lived in the San Francisco Bay Area, in 1975 Pittman caught a Greyhound bus to Oakland, California. Having started playing in 1974, by 1977 he was a professional musician. In his days in the Bay Area, Pittman met several blues musicians including Sonny Rhodes, Cool Papa Sadler, Jimmy McCracklin, Lowell Fulson, Percy Mayfield, and J.J. Malone. Cool Papa proved to be the guiding hand, and Pittman played alongside him for 13 years. Pittman formed the Tight Fit Blues Band in 1980, the first outfit where he had been the frontman. Pittman variously worked or recorded with Dave Alexander, Sugar Pie DeSanto and the Mississippi Delta Blues Band.

Pittman recorded a single in 1990, released on his own Tight Fit Records label. This was followed by the album, Meet Me On The Corner (2007). In 2004, Pittman was named as the 'Blues Harmonica Player of the Year' by the Bay Area Blues Society. In 2010 after a 35-year stint in the Bay Area, Pittman relocated to Austin, Texas. His association with Eddie Stout, led to Stout producing Pittman's latest studio album, Birdlegg (Dialtone Records, 2013). This was recorded live in the studio, with eight original Pittman penned tracks and four reworkings of older songs. The covers were of "Fanny Mae", "I'll Play the Blues For You," "747" and "You Upset My Mind."

He has appeared at a number of festivals, amongst them the Eastside Kings Blues Festival, and Blues at Sea (2015), including a couple of joint performances with Lowell Fulson. Pittman has toured across the United States and appeared several times in Europe. After relocating there in 2010, in 2013 Pittman was still living in Austin, Texas. He currently plays monthly at The Skylark Lounge in Austin.

In 2016, Pittman released the live album, The Blues Tornado Live.

== Discography ==
=== Singles ===
| Year | A-side | B-side | Record label |
|---|---|---|---|
| 1990 | "Good Time Blues" | "Blues Jumped on a Rabbit" | Tight Fit Records |

=== Albums ===
| Year | Title | Record label | Credited as |
|---|---|---|---|
| 2007 | Meet Me on the Corner | Tight Fit Records | Birdlegg & the Tight Fit Blues Band |
| 2013 | Birdlegg | Dialtone Records | Birdlegg & the Tight Fit Blues Band |
| 2016 | The Blues Tornado Live | Solo Blues | Birdlegg |
