= The Surfaris =

American surf rock band

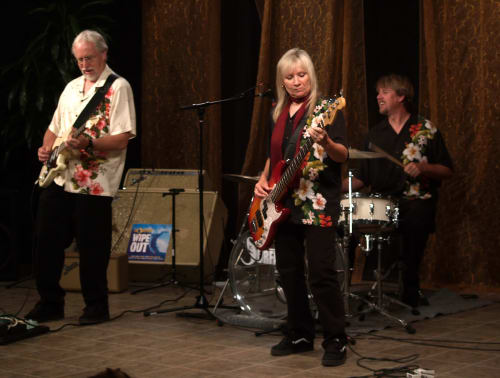
- The Surfaris in a concert, 2007

Background information
- Origin: Glendora, California, U.S.
- Genre: Surf rock
- Years active: 1962–1966, 1973, 1976, 1981–2017 for the actual Surfaris band led by Jim Fuller. Bob Berryhill’s Surfaris has continued from the 80s to present.
- Labels: DFS, Princess, Dot, Decca, GNP Crescendo, MGM Records
- Members: Bob; Gene; Deven; Joel Berryhill
- Past members: Ron Wilson; Pat Connolly; Jim Pash; Bob Berryhill; Ken Forssi; Jim Fuller
- Website: thesurfaris.com

The Surfaris are an American surf music band formed in Glendora, California, in 1962. They are best known for two songs that hit the charts in the Los Angeles area: "Surfer Joe" and the instrumental "Wipe Out", which were the A-side and B-side of the same 45 rpm single. "Wipe Out" reached the Hot 100 in June 1963, then "Surfer Joe" did so on the last day in August.

The Surfaris were inducted into the Musicians Hall of Fame and Museum in 2019 for "Wipe Out".

== Career ==
The original band members were Ron Wilson (drums, vocals), Jim Fuller (lead guitar), Bob Berryhill (rhythm guitar), and Pat Connolly (bass).

In the fall of 1962, Southern California high school students Jim Fuller and Pat Connolly called friend and guitarist Berryhill for a practice session at Berryhill's house. The trio practiced for about four hours and met drummer Wilson at a high school dance later that evening, whereupon the band was born. "Wipe Out" was written and recorded by the quartet later that winter, with the song reaching No. 2 nationally in 1963 before becoming an international hit.

Saxophone player Jim Pash joined after their "Wipe Out" / "Surfer Joe" recording sessions at Pal Studios.

Ken Forssi, later of Love, played bass with The Surfaris after Pat Connolly left.

== "Wipe Out" ==
Wilson's energetic drum solo made "Wipe Out" one of the best-remembered instrumental songs of the period. "Wipe Out" is also remembered particularly for its introduction. Before the music starts, Berryhill's dad broke a board (imitating a breaking surf board) near the mic, followed by a maniacal laugh and the words "Wipe Out" spoken by band manager Dale Smallin. "Wipe Out" was written in the studio by the four original members (Berryhill, Connolly, Fuller, and Wilson), initially issued on the tiny DFS label in January 1963, reissued on the tiny Princess label (No. 50) in February 1963, picked up by Dot (45-16479) in April 1963, and later reissued as Dot 45-144 in April 1965. It sold over one million copies and was awarded a gold disc.

Following the death of television personality Morton Downey, Jr., news reports and obituaries incorrectly credited him as the composer of "Wipe Out" (as well as The Chantays' "Pipeline"). As of 2010, Downey's official website continued to make this claim but it has been changed to state he "also played major roles in the production of the hit surf music era songs 'Pipeline' and 'Wipeout'."

== Disbanding and reformation ==
The band released a series of records, with two other singles, "Surfer Joe" and "Point Panic" (another group-composed instrumental), having an impact on the charts. Point Panic is a renowned surfing venue in Hawaii after which the song was named.

The original 1963 membership remained intact until August 1965 when Connolly departed before their Japanese tour. Ken Forssi replaced him on bass for the tour. Fuller resigned after the tour and the band folded in early 1966. Forssi joined the group and was the bass player for their "It Ain't Me, Babe" LP recorded at Capitol Records in Studio A in late Spring and early Summer of 1965. He died from a brain tumor in 1998.

Pat Connolly left the music business in 1965.

Ron Wilson died of a brain aneurysm on May 12, 1989, one month short of his 45th birthday. Wilson had released an album of his songs, titled Lost In The Surf, on Bennet House Records of Grass Valley, California, which was recorded in June 1987. A very small number of cassettes of this album were produced. Lost in the Surf included a cover of "Louie Louie", complete with Scottish bagpipes.

Jim Pash, who played saxophone in the earlier formation and was later a guitarist, died April 29, 2005, of heart failure at age 56.

Jim Fuller co-founded the Surfaris in 61' with Connolly. The band reformed in 81' with Pash and Berryhill but in 1983 Berryhill left the band because neither Pash nor Fuller wanted Berryhill's wife to join the band as bassist. By the mid-'80s, Fuller's The Surfaris added new players, such as Kelly Lammers, Robert Watson, Jay Truax, Paul Johnson (Mr. Moto), and Dave Raven, among others. These new band members remain in The Surfaris today.

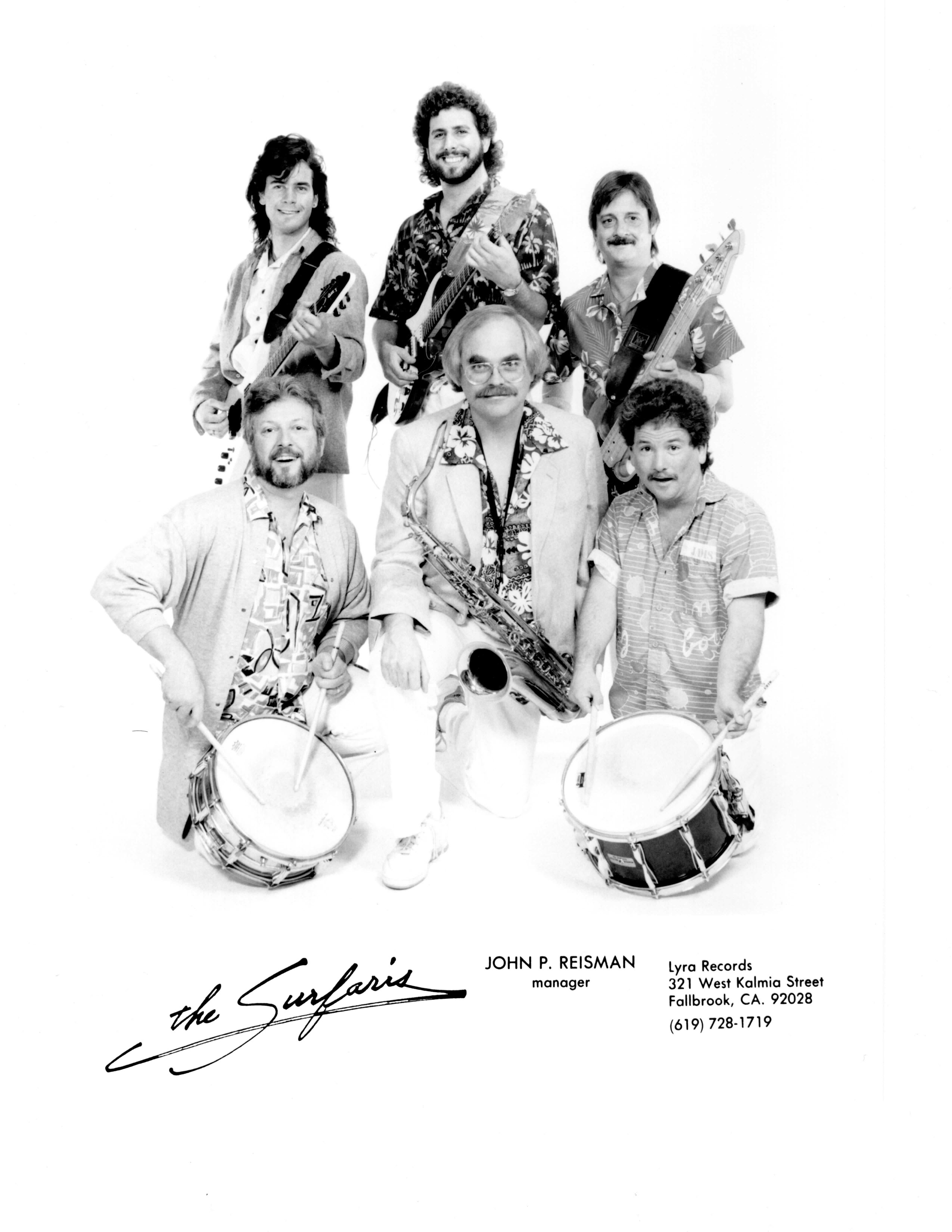
The Surfaris in 1987

However, in 1986 John P. Reisman took over management of the Fuller/Pash version of 'The Surfaris'. In 1987, the manager engaged the band with Columbia Pictures 'New Gidget Show' and in 1987 recorded the cut 'Bred to Shred' for the episode (Jim Pash: Producer; John Reisman; Engineer). The full band with the latest lineup appeared in the production. Just prior to that Chris Pritchard was in the lineup on vocals and guitar. During that period the manager focused on fairs and festivals, playing for audiences of ten to one hundred thousand at times. However, the band did continue to play clubs to bring the music to as many venues as possible. Bill Silva Entertainment during this period of management known as Fahn & Silva Entertainment handled the contracting.

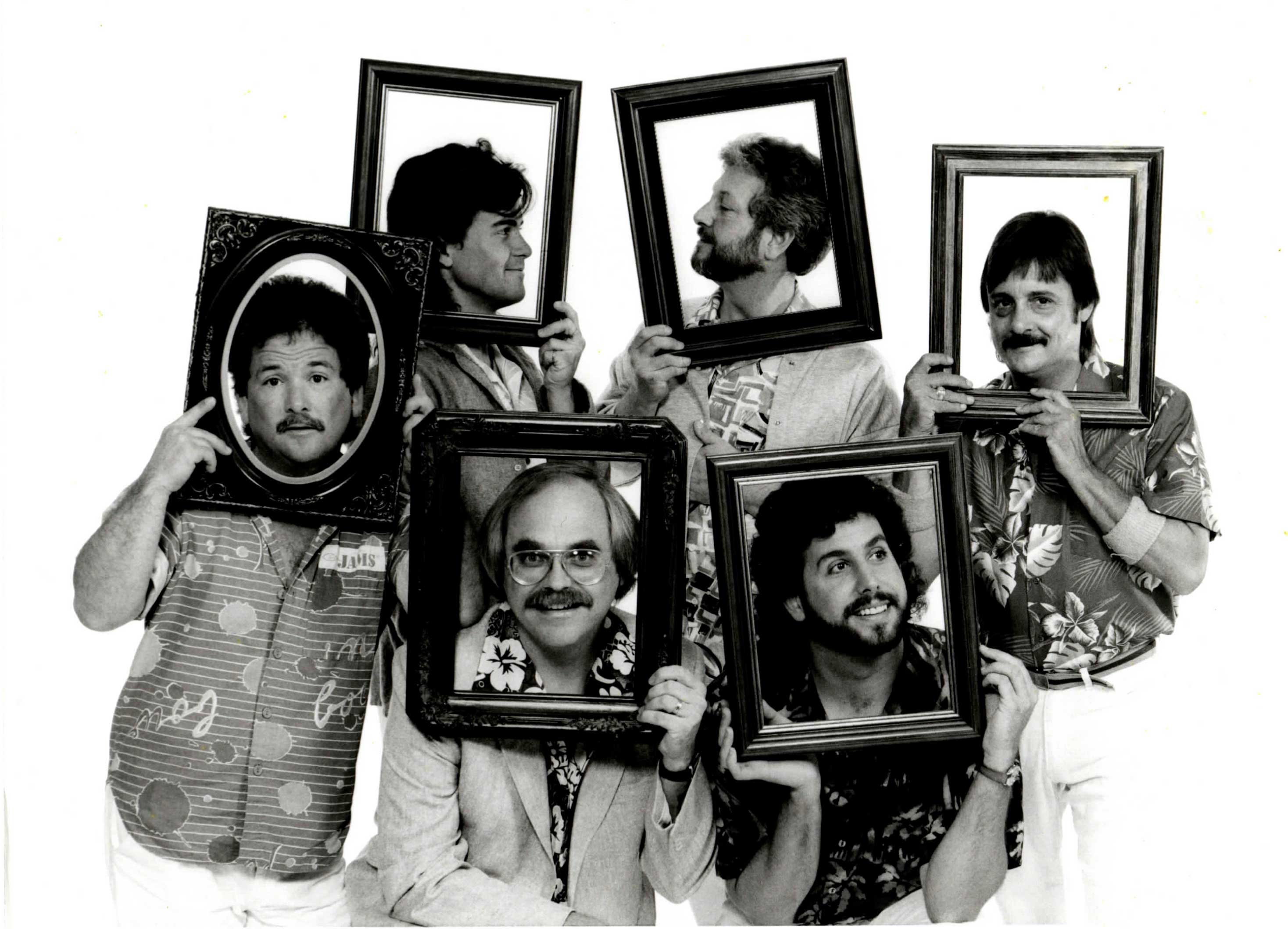
The Surfaris Fuller/Pash version Second Lineup Promo Shot Clockwise from top: Murray, Fuller, Fagenson, Pash, Mehler, Lash

Jim Fuller later had another band concurrently with The Surfaris "Jim Fuller and the Beatnik", until his passing on March 3, 2017, in Arcadia, California at age 69.

After leaving the band, Berryhill became a teacher until late 2000, when he created a new band with his family and named it The Surfaris. Now the last original member playing professionally, Berryhill performs worldwide as The Surfaris with his wife Gene Berryhill and sons, Deven and Joel Berryhill. In 2003, Berryhill's band re-recorded "Wipe Out" and eight original songs, which is what he wanted to do for the first "Wipe Out" session in 1962. At the time, the boys just 15 and 17 years old were forced to play other writers' songs, not by The Surfaris, which were later replaced by the company's players while The Surfaris were on tour. Lawsuits ensued in favor of The Surfaris. In 2015, Berryhill recorded and released the album titled The Surfaris Hurley Sessions.

== Members ==
- Jim Fuller – lead guitar (1962–1966, 1981–2017; died 2017)
- Pat Connolly – bass (1962–1965)
- Ron Wilson – vocals, drums (1962–1966; died 1989)
- Jim Pash – saxophone, guitar (1963–1966, 1981–2005; died 2005)
- Bob Berryhill – rhythm guitar (1962–1966, 1981–1983)
- Ken Forssi – bass (1965–1966; died 1998)
- Jay Truax – bass (1984–2017?)
- Rob Watson - Keyboards
- Dave Raven - Drums
- Dusty Watson - Drums
- Paul Johnson - Lead Guitar
- Ron Eglit - Rhythm Guitar
- Kelly Lammers - Guitar (1981?–1984?)
- Chris Pritchard - Guitar (198*?–1987)
- Louis Fagenson - Guitar, Slide Guitar, Keyboards (198*?–1987?)
- Don Murray - vocals, drums (1981–1996)
- John Mehler - vocals, drums (1986–?)
- Scott Lash - Guitar (1987–1988)

=== The Surfaris featuring Jim Fuller and Jim Pash ===
Jim Pash/Jim Fullers Surfaris managed by John Reisman/Lyra Records & Productions

- Jim Fuller - vocals, rhythm guitar
- Jim Pash - vocals, saxophone
- Don Murray - vocals, drums
- John Mehler - vocals, drums, percussion
- Chris Pritchard - vocals, lead/rhythm guitar (198*?–1987)
- Scott Lash vocals, lead/rhythm guitar (1987–1988)
- Louis Fagenson - vocals, guitar, slide guitar, keyboards

=== The Surfaris featuring Bob Berryhill ===
The lineup of Berryhill's Surfaris has been stable since its 2000 founding.

- Bob Berryhill – lead guitar
- Deven Berryhill – vocals, guitar
- Gene Berryhill – bass
- Joel Berryhill – vocals, drums

== Discography ==
=== Albums ===
- 1963: Wipe Out (Dot DLP-3535/DLP-25535)
- 1963: Play (Decca DL-4470/DL-74470)
- 1964: Hit City '64 (Decca DL-4487/DL-74487)
- 1964: Fun City U.S.A. (Decca DL-4560/DL-74560)
- 1965: Hit City '65 (Decca DL-4614/DL-74614)
- 1965: It Ain't Me, Babe (Decca DL-4683/DL-74683)
- 1983: Surf Party! The Best of The Surfaris Live! [rec. 1981] (Koinkidink KWK-102; CD reissue: GNP Crescendo GNPD-2239, 1994)
- 2003: Basic Tracks by Jim Fuller's Surfaris (Got It Records 0101)
- 2005: Wipe Out by Bob Berryhill's Surfaris (Calvary Chapel Music 6021)
- 2006: Street Party by Jim Fuller's Surfaris (Heyday Records 35753)
- 2015: Hurley Sessions by Bob Berryhill's Surfaris (Salt Talk Music 41662)

=== Singles ===
- 4/63: "Wipe Out" // "Surfer Joe" (DFS 11/12; Princess 50; Dot 16479)
- 9/63: "Point Panic" // "Waikiki Run" (Decca 31538)
- 11/63: "Santa's Speed Shop" // "A Surfer's Christmas List" (Decca 31561)
- 12/63: "Scatter Shield" // "I Wanna Take a Trip to the Islands" (Decca 31581)
- 3/64: "Go Go Go for Louie's Place" // "Murphy the Surfie" (Decca 31605)
- 6/64: "Dune Buggy" // "Boss Barracuda" (Decca 31641)
- 10/64: "Karen" // "Hot Rod High" (Decca 31682)
- 1/65: "Beat '65" // "Black Denim" (Decca 31731)
- 5/65: "Theme Of The Battle Maiden" // "Somethin' Else" (Decca 31784)
- 7/65: "You Can't Sit Down" // "Surfer Joe" (Dot 16757)
- 8/65: "Catch a Little Ride With Me" // "Don't Hurt My Little Sister" (Decca 31835)
- 4/66: "So Get Out" // "Hey Joe Where Are You Going" (Decca 31954)
- 8/66: "I'm a Hog for You" // "Wipe Out" (Decca 32003)
- 10/66: "Show Biz" // "Chicago Green" (Dot 16966)
- 4/67: "Search" // "Shake" (Dot 17008)

=== Compilations ===
- 1973: Yesterday's Pop Scene: The Surfaris – Wipe Out!
- 1974: Wipe Out, Surfer Joe and Other Great Hits
- 1976: Surfers Rule
- 1977: Gone with the Wave
- 1978: Shut Down – Music from the original soundtrack
- 1982: The History of Surf Music – Vol. 1: The Instrumental Hits 1961–1963
- 1984: Wipe Out: 20 Instrumental Greats
- 1987: Wipe Out (The Singles Album 1963–1967)
- 1987: The Best of 60s Surf (Original Master Recordings)
- 1989: Surfin' Hits
- 1989: Surfin' Sixties (Baby Boomer Classics)
- 1990: Fun City U.S.A. / Play (Repertoire)
- 1991: Guitar Player Presents...Legends Of Guitar: Surf – Vol. 1
- 1994: Wipe Out! The Best of the Surfaris
- 1994: Rock Instrumental Classics – Vol. 5: Surf
- 1995: Pulp Rock Instros – Vol. 1
- 1995: Surfaris Stomp
- 1995: Revenge of the Surf Instrumentals
- 1996: Cowabunga! The Surf Box Set
- 1996: Teen Beat – Vol. 3
- 1996: Let's Go Trippin' (Classic Tracks from the Surf & Hot Rod Era)
- 1996: Surf Crazy: Original Surfin' Hits
- 1996: Jenny McCarthy's Surfin' Safari
- 1997: Guitar Heroes
- 1997: Hot Rod Presents...Big Boss Instrumentals
- 1997: Kahuna Classics: A Collection of Surf Music
- 1998: Hard Rock Cafe – Surf
- 1998: Surf! Sand! Sun!
- 1998: Surfers Rule / Gone with the Wave (BGO)
- 1999: Wipe Out / Play (BGO)
- 2000: KFJC 89.7 – Water Logged
- 2000: Teen Beat – Vol. 5
- 2003: Lost Legends of Surf Guitar – Vol. 2: Point Panic!
- 2005: Hit City '64 / Fun City U.S.A. (BGO)
