= Screamin' Cheetah Wheelies =

American band

The Screamin' Cheetah Wheelies is a band from Nashville, Tennessee, US, which was formed in April 1991. The band features a heavy southern bluesy jam oriented style which led to comparisons with groups such as Lynyrd Skynyrd, The Allman Brothers Band, The Black Crowes, Brother Cane and Cry of Love.

== History ==
The core of the band was started by college buddies Rick White (guitarist) and Terry Thomas (drummer). After meeting Bob Watkins (guitarist), the three started occasionally jamming together in 1989. It wasn't until Rick White met singer Mike Farris, in 1991, that things really came together. Original Bass players were Mark W. Winchester and Randy Threet. The five members of SCW assembled at a local warehouse loft studio near Cannery Row in Nashville. On April 24, 1991, the band convened for their first jam and writing session together. The band recalls it as Divine Dispensation. They immediately bonded and wrote five songs the first night which would end up being selected for the SCW self-titled CD.

With the addition of Steve Burgess (bass guitar) replacing Randy Threet, the lineup was complete. The band chose their name from a The Far Side illustration by artist Gary Larson captioned "Cheetah Wheelies". The band added "Screamin'" (officially omitting the last letter in a nod to colloquial southern slang) and began playing local bars. The band was soon playing all the local venues including Ace of Clubs, 328 Performance Hall, and the world famous Exit/In. However, it was their residency shows at a small blues club called The Grapevine Cafe, across the street from the now closed Gold Rush near Vanderbilt University, that gained industry attention. These shows were always a sold-out affair and led to the band being signed to Atlantic Records in 1993 by the infamous Jason Flom.

The band released their debut, The Screamin' Cheetah Wheelies, in Oct 1993. The album reached #40 on the Billboard Heatseekers chart. The album was recorded at Ardent Studios in Memphis and produced by Paul Ebersold. Their single, "Shakin' the Blues", reached the album-rock top ten.

The band was known for their relentless touring schedule. Upon the release of their debut CD in the fall of 1993, the band hit the road opening shows for The Warren Haynes Band. In 1994, SCW toured for several months straight opening shows with Meatloaf, The Allman Brothers Band and landed a coveted slot on the H.O.R.D.E. tour.

In 1996, the band released Magnolia; this album's varied musical styles ranged from "Magnolia", a thunderous rock and roll epic, to "Gypsy Lullaby", a delicate ode showing Farris' blistering vocals at their best. "Magnolia" was produced by Michael Barbiero and featured a guest appearance by Warren Haynes of Gov't Mule. The band signed with Capricorn Records in 1997 and rereleased “Magnolia” with a different cover. Big Wheel, released in 1998, contained "Standing In The Sun" and "Boogie King", a song as much at home in the mosh pit as cruising the local drag. "Boogie King" was used on the soundtrack of the movie "Bride of Chucky." "Right Place, Wrong Time" was used in the "Malcolm in the Middle" episode "Home Alone 4" and included in "Songs from Malcolm in the Middle," the soundtrack to the television series which was released in early 2001.

The SCW went on to release five studio CDs, two live CDs total with two independent releases recorded at the Watkins home studio, Thundershack.

The band toured with many notable national acts through the 90s, including Meat Loaf, Joan Osborne and the Allman Brothers Band. SCW ended their touring career in 1999 opening a double bill arena tour with ZZ Top and Lynyrd Skynyrd.

The band last performed together on October 30, 2004, at 3rd and Lindsley in Nashville, TN.

Following the band's dissolution, Farris has released four solo albums: "Goodnight Sun" (2002), "Salvation In Lights" (2007) on INO Records, "Shine for All the People" (2014) on Compass Records, which won a Grammy for Best Roots Gospel album. He followed that up with "Silver & Stone" (2018) on Compass. The remaining Wheelies continued performing in various combinations. Members of the band have started or joined various side projects which continue to release recordings still. These bands include: molding, Stack, Black Mountain Prophet, Scale Hound and Blackwood.

On April 24, 2022, the band announced that it had reformed for a limited number of performances, initially in Nashville and New York City, and a follow on tour of Spain for its "The Long Goodbye" tour.

In 2023, the SCW participated in the “Ride the Tide” festival (led by Mike Farris) at the Caverns in Pelham, TN.

In 2024, SCW was invited to participate in the BBK Bilbao Music Legends Festival with Deep Purple, Canned Heat and He Pretenders. In 2026, SCW is scheduled to do a tour to celebrate the 30th Anniversary of their album, Magnolia, called “30 years of Magnolia”.

== Discography ==
- The Screamin' Cheetah Wheelies (Atlantic Records, 1993)
- Magnolia (Atlantic Records, 1996)
- Big Wheel (Capricorn, 1998)
- Live Vol. 1 and 2 (Big Top Records, 2000)
- Shakin' the Blues (live) (Dark Reign Records, 2002)
- Ten Miles High EP (2005)

== Charting singles ==
- "Shakin' the Blues" (1993) U.S. Mainstream Rock #9
- "Ride the Tide" (1994) U.S. Mainstream Rock #20
- "Hello from Venus" (1996) U.S. Mainstream Rock #25
- "Magnolia" (1997) U.S. Mainstream Rock #29
- "Boogie King" (1998) U.S. Mainstream Rock #18
