= Haskell Sadler =

American blues musician

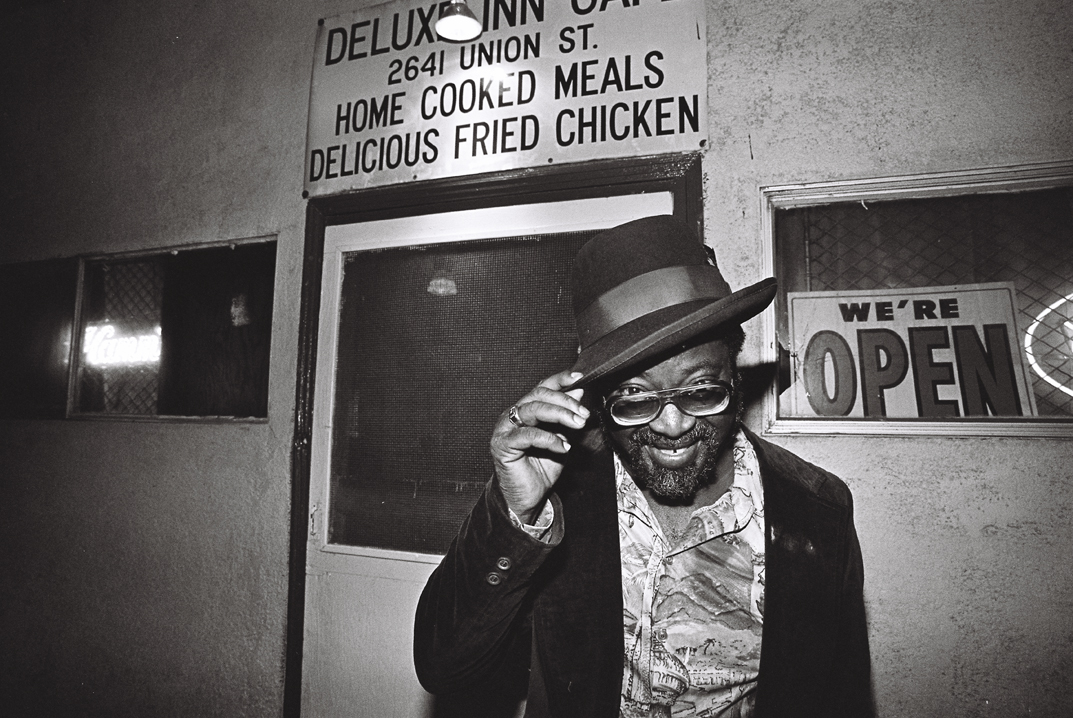
- Photo by Mark Sarfati, taken in 1981, for the East Bay Express, Berkeley, CA

Background information
- Also known as: Cool Papa
- Born: Haskell Robert Sadler; April 16, 1935; Denver, Colorado, United States
- Died: May 6, 1994 (aged 59) Berkeley, California, United States
- Genres: Blues
- Occupation(s): Singer, songwriter, guitarist
- Instrument(s): Human voice, guitar
- Years active: 1960s–1994
- Labels: TJ Records

Haskell Robert "Cool Papa" Sadler (April 16, 1935 – May 6, 1994) was an American blues singer, songwriter, and guitarist.

Born in Denver, Colorado, United States, Sadler moved to California and worked in clubs in the San Francisco Bay Area starting in the 1960s. He played a number of times at the San Francisco Blues Festival. Sadler wrote "747" as recorded by Joe Louis Walker, and "Yesterday" recorded by Tiny Powell. In the 1970s, he recorded as "Cool Papa" for TJ Records. Cool Papa proved to be a guiding hand to Gene "Birdlegg" Pittman, then a new arrival in the Bay Area, and Pittman played alongside Sadler for 13 years.

He developed diabetes, and had a leg amputated in 1990. He died, aged 59, in Berkeley, California, in 1994.

== See also ==
- West Coast blues
