= Mike Farris (musician) =

American musician

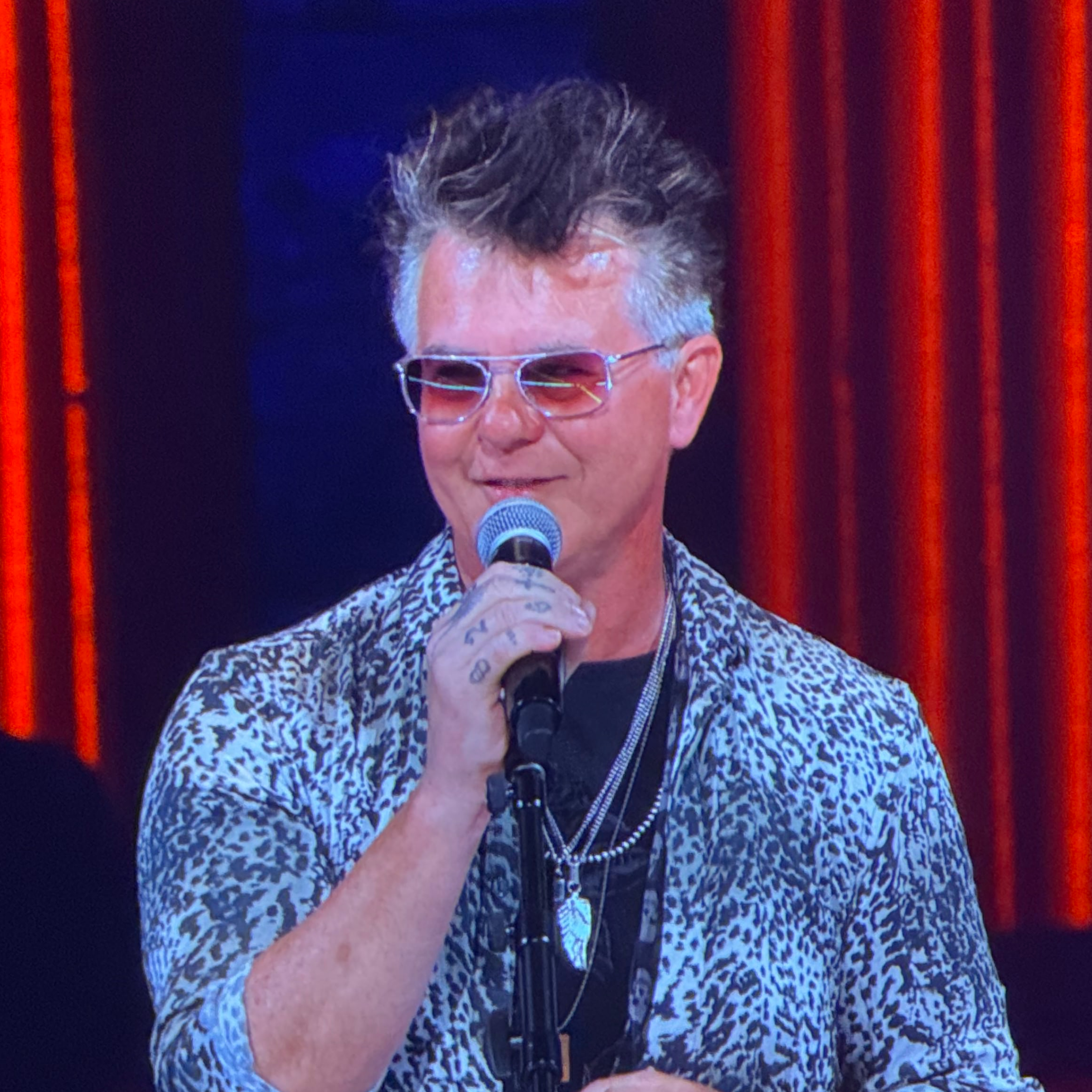
- Mike Farris performing at the Grand Ole Opry in 2025

Background information
- Born: 1968 (age 57–58); Winchester, Tennessee, U.S.
- Genres: Blues rock, gospel
- Occupation: Musician
- Instruments: Guitar, harmonica
- Years active: 1990–present
- Label: Compass Records
- Website: www.mikefarrismusic.com

Mike Farris (born c. 1968 in Winchester, Tennessee) is an American musician. He was the founder and lead singer of Screamin' Cheetah Wheelies but has been a solo act since 2001. He has put out four studio releases as well as a one live record as Mike Farris and the Roseland Rhythm Revue, as well as a charity EP as Mike Farris and the Cumberland Saints. His music is diverse but tends to be rooted in early American gospel and blues. He released the album Silver & Stone (featuring such esteemed musicians as Doug Lancio, Brother Paul Brown, Derrek Phillips, Gene Chrisman, Reese Wynans, and Joe Bonamassa) on September 7, 2018 to critical acclaim.

== Biography ==
Farris's parents divorced when he was eleven years old. He began using drugs and alcohol from an early age, and almost died from an overdose before he was 21 years old. He recovered and went on to form the group Screamin' Cheetah Wheelies in 1990. They released three major-label albums and had sustained success on the U.S. rock charts in the 1990s. After their breakup, Farris sang with SCW, Peaceful Knievel and for a time fronted Double Trouble, the backing band for Stevie Ray Vaughan. Farris became a practicing Christian and rejected drugs and alcohol, and released his first solo album, "Goodnight Sun", in 2002. He released his second solo album in 2007, '"Salvation in Lights'", on INO/Columbia Records. In 2008 Farris performed at SXSW and the Creation Festival. The live album Sunday Night Shout! was recorded at the Station Inn in Nashville, Tennessee, on October 12, 2008, but was a digital only release. On April 14, 2009, Farris released SHOUT! Live, as Mike Farris & the Roseland Rhythm Revue, featuring the McCrary Sisters. The album was recorded over four nights at his Station Inn residency.

In May 2010, after a flood in Nashville, Farris and a group of Nashville musicians recorded a charity EP entitled The Night the Cumberland Came Alive by Mike Farris and the Cumberland Saints. Part of the proceeds were donated to Nashville's Downtown Presbyterian Church where the album was recorded on May 17, 2010. The Cumberland Saints included Sam Bush, Ketch Secor, and Gill Landry of Old Crow Medicine Show; Byron House, Kenny Vaughan, and members of the Roseland Rhythm Revue and the McCrary Sisters.

On February 8, 2015, Farris won the 2014 Grammy Award for Best Roots Gospel Album for Shine for All the People.

On May 1, 2018, Farris began shooting the “golden wings” music video, starring Kingsley Sparrow. The video was shot and directed by Sebastian Smith.

On September 7, 2018 the album Silver & Stone was released. It featured such esteemed musicians as Doug Lancio (John Hiatt), Gene Chrisman (Dusty Springfield, Elvis Presley), Derrek Phillips (Robben Ford, Hank Williams Jr.), Reese Wynans (Joe Bonamassa, Double Trouble), Joe Bonamassa, and long-time Farris collaborator Paul Brown (Waterboys, Ann Peebles). The album has received positive reviews from several magazines and online publications.

Farris performed Deep Purple's version of "Hush" as the opening number at the 2019 Musicians Hall of Fame and Museum Concert and Induction Ceremony.

In July 2022 Farris rejoined his band mates, the Screamin’ Cheetah Wheelies, for seven sold out shows, 3 of which were in Nashville, TN, their original home base.

== Discography ==
- Goodnight Sun (Mean It!, 2002)
- Salvation in Lights (INO, 2007)
- Shout! Live (INO, 2008)
- Live from Westlake Studio B (Independent, 2009)
- The Night the Cumberland Came Alive (Entertainment One, 2010)
- Shine for All the People (Compass, 2014)
- Silver & Stone (Compass Records, 2018)
- The Sound of Muscle Shoals (2025)

== Awards ==
- 2008 Americana Music Award for new and emerging artist
- 2010 GMA Dove Award for Traditional Gospel Album of the Year for SHOUT! Live
- 2014 Grammy Award for Best Roots Gospel Album for Shine For All the People

Awards
Preceded by The Avett Brothers	AMA New/Emerging Artist Of The Year; 2008	Succeeded by Justin Townes Earle
