= Les Cooper =

American doo wop musician (1921–2013)

Les Cooper (March 15, 1921 – August 3, 2013) was an American doo wop musician, best known for his hit rock instrumental "Wiggle Wobble".

Cooper was born in Norfolk, Virginia, United States. He sang in several New York doo wop groups, including The Empires and The Whirlers, and was the manager of the group The Charts. In 1962, he signed to Everlast Records and released the single "Dig Yourself" b/w "Wiggle Wobble", billed with his band as Les Cooper & the Soul Rockers. Both sides were produced by Bobby Robinson. The B-side was an instrumental featuring the saxophone playing of Joe Grier (formerly of The Charts himself); it caught on at radio and became a nationwide hit, peaking at No. 12 on the US Billboard R&B chart in 1962, and No. 22 on the Billboard Hot 100 early in 1963. It was his only hit; one of the follow-up singles was the sonically similar "Let's Do the Boston Monkey", recorded for Enjoy Records.

Cooper died on August 3, 2013, at the VNSNY Haven Hospice Specialty Care Unit in New York, New York.

== See also ==
- List of 1960s one-hit wonders in the United States
