= Fannie Mae (song) =

Single by Buster Brown
- B-side: "Lost in a Dream"
- Released: 1959 (U.S.)
- Recorded: 1959
- Genre: R&B
- Length: 2:57
- Label: Fire Records
- Songwriter: Buster Brown

"Fannie Mae" is a 1959 song, written and performed by the American blues and R&B singer, Buster Brown.

The track made it into the Top 40 of the Billboard Hot 100, and to number one on the US Billboard R&B chart in April 1960. AllMusic's Vladimir Bogdanov called the song "one of the most undiluted blues records to ever make the Top 40."

== Chart performance ==
- US Billboard R&B Chart (number 1)
- US Billboard Hot 100 (number 38)

== In popular culture ==
The song is featured in the film American Graffiti (1973).

== Recorded versions ==
- Joey Dee and the Starliters (1962 - Doin' the Twist - Live at the Peppermint Lounge LP)
- The Rolling Stones
- Robbie Lane and the Disciples (1964)
- The Righteous Brothers (1964)
- The Steve Miller Band (1968)
- Domenic Troiano (1973)
- Gene Summers (1975)
- James Cotton (1975)
- Southside Johnny & The Asbury Jukes (1976)
- Magic Slim (1982)
- Jaco Pastorius (1983)
- Elvin Bishop (1991)
- Canned Heat (1994)
- Carl Weathersby (1996)
- Mel Brown (2001)
- Booker T. & the MG's (2003)
- Gary U. S. Bonds (2004)
- Coco Montoya (2010)
- Playing for Change (Playing for Change Live) (2010) CD
- Jello Biafra (2011)
- Gene "Birdlegg" Pittman (2013)
- Shawn Holt & the Teardrops (2013)
