= Fury Records =

American record label

- Founded: 1957
- Founder: Bobby Robinson
- Country of origin: United States

Fury Records was set up by Bobby Robinson in 1957. In 1959 it had a Billboard Hot 100 number-one hit with "Kansas City", sung by Wilbert Harrison. In the late 1970s, it helped launch Grandmaster Flash.

== See also ==
- List of record labels
- Fury Records artists
