= Wipe Out (instrumental) =

1963 instrumental by the Surfaris

Single by the Surfaris

from the album Wipe Out
- A-side: "Surfer Joe"
- Released: January 1963
- Recorded: 1962
- Studio: Pal Recording Studio, Cucamonga, California
- Genre: Surf rock; instrumental rock
- Length: 2:38 (original); 2:15 (album/single)
- Label: DFS, Princess, Dot
- Songwriters: Bob Berryhill, Pat Connolly, Jim Fuller, Ron Wilson

The Surfaris singles chronology
| "Wipe Out" (1963) | "Point Panic" (1963) |

Audio sample
- "Wipeout": file; help

"Wipe Out" is a surf music instrumental composed by Bob Berryhill, Pat Connolly, Jim Fuller and Ron Wilson. Composed in the form of twelve-bar blues, the tune was first performed and recorded by the Surfaris, who became famous with the single in 1963.

The single was first issued on the independent label DFS in January 1963 and Princess in February, then picked up for national distribution on Dot in April. Dot reissued the single in April 1965. A second version by the Surfaris (with a different B-side) was released in 1966 on Decca and again in 1973 on MCA.

The title of the song is a colloquial surfing term of Southern California. Specifically, a "wipe out" is a fall from a surfboard, especially one that looks painful.

In 2020, the version of the song by the Surfaris was inducted into the Grammy Hall of Fame.

== Background ==
Bob Berryhill, Pat Connolly, Jim Fuller and Ron Wilson wrote "Wipe Out" almost on the spot while at Pal Recording Studio in Cucamonga, California, in late 1962, when they realized they needed a suitable B-side for the intended "Surfer Joe" single. One of the band members suggested introducing the song with a cracking sound, imitating a breaking surfboard, followed by a manic voice babbling, "ha ha ha ha ha, wipe out". The voice was that of the band's manager, Dale Smallin.

== Single reception ==
"Wipe Out" spent four months on the Billboard Hot 100 in the summer of 1963, reaching number 2, behind Little Stevie Wonder's "Fingertips". Meanwhile, the original A-side "Surfer Joe", sung by Ron Wilson, only attracted airplay in the wake of "Wipe Out"'s success, peaking at number 62 during its six-week run. "Wipe Out" returned to the Hot 100 in 1966, reaching number 16 on the Hot 100 (and number 63 for the year), peaking at number 9 on the Cash Box chart, selling approximately 700,000 copies in the U.S. The single spent a grand total of thirty weeks on the Hot 100. Wilson's energetic drum solo for "Wipe Out" helped the song become one of the best-remembered instrumental songs of the period.

== Personnel ==
- Bob Berryhill – rhythm guitar
- Jim Fuller – lead guitar
- Pat Connolly – bass
- Ron Wilson – drums

== Charts ==
| Chart (1963/1966) | Peak position |
|---|---|
| Canadian CHUM Chart (1963) | 11 |
| Canadian CHUM Chart (1966) | 2 |
| Canadian RPM Top Singles (1966) | 5 |
| German Singles Chart | 46 |
| UK Singles Chart | 5 |
| US Billboard Hot 100 | 2 |
| US Cashbox Top 100 | 5 |
| US Hot R&B Singles | 10 |

== In popular culture ==
Following the 2001 death of television personality Morton Downey Jr., news reports, obituaries and Downey's official website incorrectly credited him as the composer of "Wipe Out".

The song lends its title to the 1995 video game Wipeout.

== The Fat Boys and the Beach Boys version ==
"Wipeout!"

Single by the Fat Boys and the Beach Boys

from the album Crushin' and Still Cruisin'
- B-side: "Crushin'"
- Released: July 10, 1987
- Length: 3:50
- Label: Tin Pan Apple; Polydor
- Songwriters: Bob Berryhill; Pat Connolly; Jim Fuller; Ron Wilson
- Producers: Brian Wilson; Albert Cabrera; Tony Moran; the Beach Boys

The Fat Boys and the Beach Boys singles chronology
| "Falling in Love" (1987) | "Wipeout!" (1987) | "The Twist" (1988) |

the Beach Boys singles chronology
| "California Dreamin'" (1986) | "Wipeout!" (1987) | "Happy Endings" (1987) |

In mid-1987, the American hip-hop trio Fat Boys collaborated with the Beach Boys on a version of "Wipe Out", retitled "Wipeout!", that reached number 12 in the United States and number two in the United Kingdom.

=== Music video ===
The Fat Boys load up a car with beach gear and then drive off. The Beach Boys are driving a Jeep Wrangler through the city, transforming the people's clothes into beachwear. Both bands go around the city in the direction of a beach, while they perform the song and draw the city inhabitants to the beach, where one of the Fat Boys tries to lift a heavy weight and is laughed at by some women. The Beach Boys play DJ in the street.

=== Track listings ===
7-inch single

1. "Wipeout!" – 3:50
2. Fat Boys – "Crushin'" – 3:40

12-inch maxi

1. "Wipeout! (Wave I)" – 6:05
2. "Wipeout! (Wave II)" – 5:43
3. Fat Boys – "Crushin'" (12-inch) – 5:38

=== Charts ===
==== Weekly charts ====
| Chart (1987) | Peak position |
|---|---|
| Belgium (Ultratop 50 Flanders) | 17 |
| Europe (Eurochart Hot 100) | 20 |
| Ireland (IRMA) | 3 |
| Italy Airplay (Music & Media) | 18 |
| Netherlands (Dutch Top 40) | 11 |
| Netherlands (Single Top 100) | 13 |
| New Zealand (Recorded Music NZ) | 2 |
| UK Singles (Official Charts) | 2 |
| US Billboard Hot 100 | 12 |
| US Hot R&B/Hip-Hop Songs (Billboard) | 10 |
| West Germany (GfK) | 30 |

==== Year-end charts ====
| Chart (1987) | Position |
|---|---|
| UK Singles (OCC) | 35 |

=== Certifications ===
| Region | Certification | Certified units/sales |
|---|---|---|
| United Kingdom (BPI) | Silver | 250,000^{^} |
^{^} Shipments figures based on certification alone.

== Other cover versions ==
- The Ventures covered "Wipe Out" on their albums Let's Go (1963) and The Ventures on Stage (1965).
- In 1993, Animal from the Muppets covered the song for the album Muppet Beach Party. Released as a single in 1994, it reached number 38 on the UK Singles Chart. A music video was created to promote the single and the album.

== See also ==
- List of one-hit wonders in the United States
