= Ron Wilson (drummer) =

American musician

- Born: Ronald Lee Wilson; June 26, 1944; Los Angeles, California, U.S.
- Died: May 12, 1989 (aged 44) Placer County, California, U.S.
- Genre: Surf music
- Occupation: Musician
- Instrument: Drums

Ronald Lee Wilson (June 26, 1944 – May 12, 1989) was an American musician and recording artist, best known as an original member and drummer of The Surfaris, an early surf music group of the 1960s. Wilson's energetic drum solo on "Wipe Out" (a #2 US/#5 UK hit) made it one of the best-known instrumental songs of the period.

== Biography ==
Ron Wilson's drum riff on "Wipe Out" was so striking that "the yardstick for every aspiring young drummer in the early 60s was to be able to play a drum solo called 'Wipe Out'." Wilson played drums for the Charter Oak Lancers high school band in Covina, California, in 1962. Their parents took them to gigs because none of them was old enough to drive. The members were inspired by the guitarist Dick Dale, but it was the drummer who inspired their biggest hit. Wilson said he had dreamed of a surfer and with the others wrote a song called "Surfer Joe", sung by Wilson. It was recorded at Pal Studios in Cucamonga, California in January 1963.

The band needed a B-side and Wilson played a drummer's practice exercise called a paradiddle. Wilson added stresses to what had been a rhythm he played in his school marching band, and the guitarists followed. According to band member Bob Berryhill, "Ronnie loved Scottish marches and played with our high school Tartan marching band. That came into play coupled with my suggestion of bongo rock-type breaks for an arrangement, a drum-solo type of song with a simple guitar melody. Ronnie started playing the famous Wipe Out solo and in about ten minutes we had the song together." They subsequently toured in various forms for many years and at times invited members of the audience to attempt Wilson's drum riff while the guitarists played the melody.

He is sometimes mistaken for another Ron Wilson that collaborated with the Beach Boys' Brian Wilson for the 1968 songs "We're Together Again" and "I'll Keep On Loving You". They are not related.

Ron Wilson also played drums for the folk singer Tim Morgon during the late 1960s. Morgon was a popular fixture at Bob Stane's Glendale Ice House and later at the Pasadena Ice House.

During the late 1970s and early 1980s, Wilson was the drummer with the Monica Dupont band, which included Mel Brown, Johnny Heartsman, Bobby Forte. and from time to time Bard Dupont. They recorded honky tonk live at the Stony Inn, in Sacramento, California.

Wilson released an album of his songs titled Lost In The Surf on Bennet House Records of Grass Valley, California, which was recorded in June 1987. A very small number of cassettes of this album were produced. Lost in the Surf included a cover of "Louie Louie", complete with Scottish bagpipes.

Wilson died of a brain aneurysm on May 12, 1989, one month short of his 45th birthday.

Wilson and the rest of the Surfaris were inducted into the Musicians Hall of Fame in 2019.
