= Jim Fuller (musician) =

American musician, singer, songwriter, Surf musician

James Evans Fuller (27 June 1947 – 3 March 2017) was the lead guitarist and main songwriter for the 1960s rock band The Surfaris.

Fuller was known as the "Godfather" of surf music, a Californian instrumental music.

He was also a studio musician, and performed on many other artists' such as "The Seeds", rock, folk, and blues songs throughout his career, performing vocals, lead and bass guitar.

Fuller, with his Fender Stratocaster guitar in photographs and its sound on The Surfaris albums, contributed to the popularity of Leo Fender's instruments.

He is featured on "Hollywood's Rock Walk of Fame".

As of 2004 he continued to perform with The Surfaris and his other band, "Jim Fuller & The Beatnik" with a fan base in United States, Europe, and Japan.

He died on 3 March 2017, in Arcadia, California, at the age of 69.

Along with the rest of the Surfaris, Fuller was inducted into the Musicians Hall of Fame in 2019.

== Best known hits ==
- "Wipe Out"
- "Point Panic"
- "Surfer Joe"
- "Waikiki Run...."
