= Random Hero (band) =

American Christian rock band

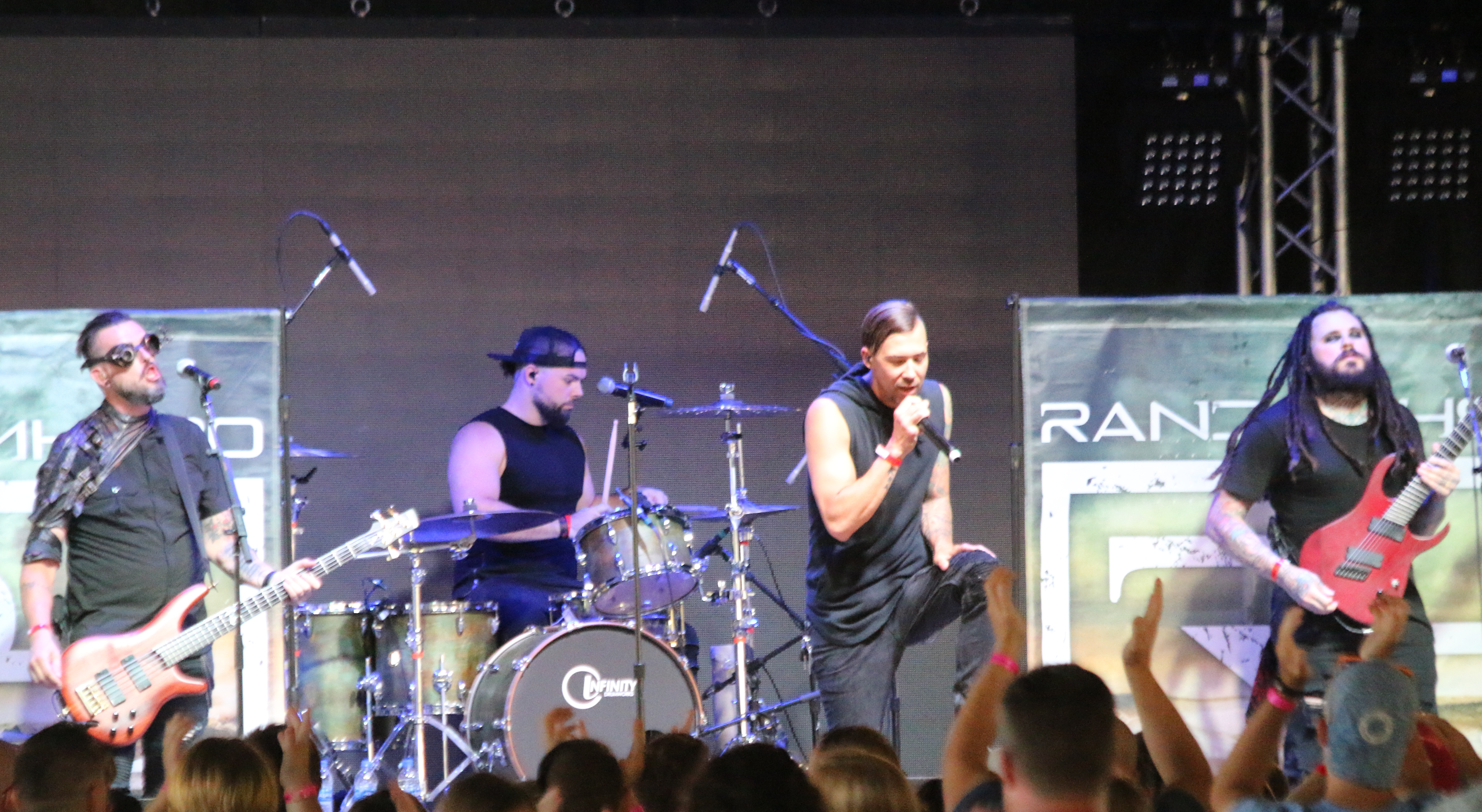
- Random Hero performing at Lifest in 2018

Background information
- Origin: Denver, Colorado, United States
- Genres: Christian rock; Alternative rock
- Years active: 2005–present
- Labels: Skies Fall; Redcord; Rockfest Records
- Members: Aaron Watkins; Rob "Los" McDonough
- Past members: Kat Barnes; Nick Pearson; Robert Higdon; Derek Arosemena; Joshua Bertrand; Josh Tarrant; Alex Salinas; Jon Cornella; Patrick Madsen; Micah Labrosse
- Website: www.randomheromusic.com

Random Hero is an American Christian rock band formed in Denver, Colorado in 2005. The band's current lineup consists of lead vocalist Aaron Watkins and bassist Rob "Los" McDonough. Random Hero has achieved multiple charting placements on the Billboard and National BDS radio airplay charts, including a number-one Christian Rock single with "Tension", which held the top spot for eight consecutive weeks. The band has also earned two Top 25 Billboard Mainstream Rock singles and six Top 5 Billboard Christian Rock singles.

== History ==
=== Formation and early years (2005–2009) ===
Random Hero was formed in 2005 by original members Joshua Bertrand, Derek Arosemena, Robert Higdon, Nick Pearson, and lead vocalist Kat Barnes. In April 2006, Aaron Watkins replaced Barnes as the primary lead vocalist. In August 2007, the group finished in the top three out of several hundred entrants in the "Best Band in Denver" competition hosted by local rock radio station KBPI.

In March 2008, drummer Robert Higdon left the band and was replaced by Josh Tarrant. Throughout the remainder of 2008, the band performed as direct support for various national and international touring acts. In January 2009, the band was approached by MTV to feature on the reality series Made. Guitarist Joshua Bertrand appeared on the show as a coach for a high school student from Estes Park, Colorado, in an episode that broadcast nationally and internationally.

Later that year, the band performed at AgapeFest, the Cornerstone Festival, and the Vans Warped Tour. They were also selected to play at the Elitch Gardens Theme Park "Faith Day" event alongside Relient K. Because drummer Josh Tarrant was an active member of the United States Air Force, the band was commissioned to write a song for the Air Force's Guardian Challenge. The resulting track, "Guardians of Freedom", was chosen as the official theme song for the Buckley Air Force Base entry, leading to performances for military leadership. In December 2009, Random Hero released an autonomous mobile application on the iOS App Store, becoming one of the early independent musical acts to utilize the platform.

=== Independent EPs and Skies Fall contract (2010–2012) ===
The band independently released two conceptual extended plays, the Black EP (2009) and the White EP (2010). Following a performance at Elitch Gardens' "Faith Day" opening for Skillet, the band established a working relationship with Skillet's then-guitarist, Ben Kasica. In September 2010, the band entered tracking sessions at Kasica's Skies Fall Studios in Kenosha, Wisconsin.

In early 2011, the band briefly added a secondary guitarist, Alex Salinas, who departed shortly thereafter. The Kasica-produced Breakdown EP was released in May 2011 through Skies Fall Records, accompanied by a joint publishing agreement with Skies Fall Media Group and performance rights affiliation with SESAC. The title track "Breakdown" peaked at No. 4 on the Christian rock radio charts. In July 2011, Random Hero placed as a top-three finalist in the KBPI Best Band in Denver competition for a second time.

In early 2012, Tarrant took a one-year leave of absence from the band upon his acceptance into the U.S. Air Force entertainment troupe, Tops in Blue. Andrew Whiteman served as a temporary touring replacement before Jon Cornella was formally hired as the new drummer. Shortly after, original bassist Derek Arosemena left the band to pursue other commitments and was succeeded by Rob "Los" McDonough, who had previously designed the band's logos and visual branding assets.

=== Label signings, studio albums, and lineup shifts (2013–2018) ===
In 2013, Random Hero signed with Redcord Records, distributed through Sony Music, to release their debut studio album, Carry Me, Bury Me. The record produced the Billboard Christian Rock Top 5 single "Mercy". Their second studio album, Oceans of Change, followed in 2014 and featured the singles "Not Alone" (which peaked at No. 2) and "Burn Up the Night". During this cycle, Patrick Madsen joined the band as their permanent drummer.

In 2017, the band independently tracked and issued their third album, The Covering, produced by Robert Venable. The release achieved multiple Top 5 positions on the Billboard Christian Rock charts with "Mirror Mirror", "Running", and "Impossible". Both "Running" and "Impossible" crossed over to mainstream rock radio formats, peaking within the Top 30 of the Billboard Mainstream Rock National Airplay Chart.

=== Rockfest Records and Tension (2018–present) ===
In early 2018, Random Hero signed to Rockfest Records, an independent imprint founded by Joseph Rojas of Seventh Day Slumber and distributed through the Capitol Christian Music Group. In mid-2019, long-time guitarist Joshua Bertrand left the band to prioritize family commitments. He was replaced by Micah Labrosse, a former touring session player for Disciple and Spoken.

On August 23, 2019, the band released their fourth studio album, Tension, produced by Kellen McGregor of Memphis May Fire. The project registered the highest first-week commercial positions of the band's career, debuting at No. 13 on the Billboard Christian Album Sales chart, No. 21 on the Billboard Heatseekers Albums chart, and No. 26 on the Nielsen SoundScan Current Hard Music Album Sales chart. The title track reached No. 1 on the Christian rock radio charts, remaining there for eight consecutive weeks. In December 2019, the album received a nomination for the Amp Award (Rock/Alternative Album of the Year) at the 8th Annual We Love Christian Music Awards.

== Members ==
=== Current members ===
- Aaron Watkins – lead vocals (2006–present)
- Rob "Los" McDonough – bass guitar, backing vocals (2012–present)

=== Former members ===
- Kat Barnes – lead vocals (2005–2006)
- Nick Pearson – keyboards (2005–2007)
- Robert Higdon – drums (2005–2008)
- Derek Arosemena – bass guitar (2005–2012)
- Joshua Bertrand – lead guitar, backing vocals (2005–2019)
- Josh Tarrant – drums (2008–2012)
- Alex Salinas – rhythm guitar (2011)
- Jon Cornella – drums (2012–2013)
- Patrick Madsen – drums (2014–2020)
- Micah Labrosse – lead guitar, backing vocals (2019–2020)

== Discography ==
Studio albums

- Carry Me, Bury Me (2013)
- Oceans of Change (2014)
- The Covering (2017)
- Tension (2019)

Extended plays

- The EP (Black) (2009)
- The EP (White) (2010)
- Breakdown EP (2011)
- Tension: Acoustic EP (2020)

== Awards and nominations ==
Year	Award	Category	Nominated Work	Result
2019	We Love Christian Music Awards	The Amp Award (Rock/Alternative Album of the Year)	Tension	Nominated
2020	The Grizzly Awards	Album of the Year: Modern Rock	Tension	Nominated
2020	The Grizzly Awards	Song of the Year: Modern Rock	"Tension"	Nominated
2020	The Grizzly Awards	Music Video of the Year	"Tension"	Nominated
2020	The Grizzly Awards	Best Bass Player	Rob "Los" McDonough	Nominated
2020	The Grizzly Awards	Best Drummer	Patrick Madsen	Nominated
