= Bob Berryhill =

American musician

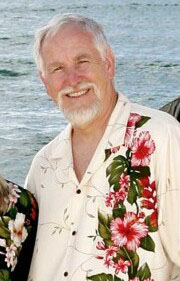

Background information
- Born: December 15, 1947 (age 78)
- Genres: Surf music, instrumentals
- Occupation: Musician
- Instrument: Rhythm guitar
- Formerly of: The Surfaris

Bob Berryhill (born December 15, 1947) is an American musician.

== Biography ==
Berryhill was a member of surf music group The Surfaris and co-writer and recording artist of "Wipe Out" and other Surfaris' hits. In 1960, when Berryhill was 13, he took a trip to the Hawaiian Islands and learned to surf and play ukulele. On returning to California, he began working seriously on guitar and two years later, "Wipe Out" was born. His role of rhythm guitar merged into lead guitar later with his new band, The Surfaris featuring Bob Berryhill.

"Wipe Out" was inducted into the Musicians Hall of Fame and Museum in 2019.
