= DJ Jazzy Jeff & the Fresh Prince discography =

- Studio albums: 5
- Compilation albums: 4
- Singles: 18

The discography of DJ Jazzy Jeff & the Fresh Prince consists of five studio albums, four compilations and 18 singles.

== Albums ==
=== Studio albums ===
List of albums, with selected chart positions
Title	Album details	Peak chart positions								Certifications
Title	Album details	US	US R&B	AUS	CAN	NL	NZ	SWI	UK	Certifications
Rock the House	Released: April 7, 1987; Label: Jive; Format: CD, CS	83	24	—	—	—	—	—	97	RIAA: Gold
He's the DJ, I'm the Rapper	Released: March 29, 1988; Label: Jive; Format: CD, CS, LP	4	5	131	23	—	47	—	68	RIAA: 3× Platinum; MC: Platinum
And in This Corner...	Released: October 31, 1989; Label: Jive; Format: CD, CS	39	19	77	43	—	—	—	—	RIAA: Gold; MC: Gold
Homebase	Released: July 23, 1991; Label: Jive; Format: CD, CS, LP	12	5	110	33	—	43	—	69	RIAA: Platinum; MC: Gold
Code Red	Released: October 12, 1993; Label: Jive; Format: CD, CS	64	39	25	68	54	—	35	50	RIAA: Gold
"—" denotes a recording that did not chart or was not released in that territory.

=== Compilation albums ===
List of albums, with selected chart positions
Title	Album details	Peak chart positions							Certifications
Title	Album details	US	US R&B	AUS	CAN	NL	NZ	UK	Certifications
Greatest Hits	Released: May 19, 1998; Label: Jive; Format: CD, CS	144	93	143	65	38	32	20	BPI: Gold
Before the Willennium	Released: March 7, 2000; Label: Collectables; Format: CD, CS	—	—	—	—	—	—	—	
Platinum & Gold Collection	Released: August 19, 2003; Label: Jive; Format: CD	—	—	—	—	—	—	—	
The Very Best of Jazzy Jeff & the Fresh Prince	Released: June 6, 2006; Label: Jive; Format: CD	—	—	—	—	—	—	—	
"—" denotes a recording that did not chart or was not released in that territory.

== Singles ==
List of singles, with selected chart positions and certifications
Title	Year	Peak chart positions										Certifications	Album
Title	Year	US	US R&B	AUS	CAN	GER	IRE	NED	NZ	SWI	UK	Certifications	Album
"Girls Ain't Nothing but Trouble"	1986	57	81	142	—	—	—	96	—	—	21		Rock the House
"The Magnificent Jazzy Jeff"	1986	—	61	—	—	—	—	—	—	—	93		Rock the House
"A Touch of Jazz"	1987	—	65	—	—	—	—	—	—	—	79		Rock the House
"Brand New Funk"	1987	—	76	—	—	—	—	—	—	—	—		He's the DJ, I'm the Rapper
"Parents Just Don't Understand"	1988	12	10	49	28	—	—	—	13	—	87	RIAA: Gold	He's the DJ, I'm the Rapper
"A Nightmare on My Street"	1988	15	9	—	61	—	—	—	—	—	—		He's the DJ, I'm the Rapper
"I Think I Can Beat Mike Tyson"	1989	58	23	52	—	—	—	—	39	—	94		And in This Corner...
"The Groove"	1990	—	70	—	—	—	—	—	—	—	—		And in This Corner...
"Summertime"	1991	4	1	52	29	12	14	12	5	11	8	RIAA: Platinum; BPI: Platinum	Homebase
"Ring My Bell"	1991	20	22	58	—	—	—	11	6	29	53	RIAA: Gold	Homebase
"The Things That U Do"	1992	—	43	109	—	—	—	21	29	—	—		Homebase
"The Fresh Prince of Bel-Air"	1992	—	—	—	—	—	—	4	—	—	—	BPI: Gold	Non-album single
"I Wanna Rock"	1993	—	—	—	—	—	—	—	—	—	—		Code Red
"Boom! Shake the Room"	1993	13	21	1	—	8	1	18	2	8	1	RIAA: Platinum; ARIA: Platinum; GER: Gold; BPI: Silver	Code Red
"I'm Looking for the One (To Be with Me)"	1993	79	70	48	—	88	21	36	18	—	24		Code Red
"Can't Wait to Be with You"	1994	—	—	—	—	—	—	—	16	—	29		Code Red
"Twinkle Twinkle (I'm Not a Star)"	1994	—	—	—	—	—	—	—	—	—	62		Code Red
"Lovely Daze"	1998	—	—	—	—	—	—	—	—	—	37		Greatest Hits
"—" denotes releases that did not chart or were not released in that territory.
