= Greatest Hits (DJ Jazzy Jeff & the Fresh Prince album) =

Greatest hits album by DJ Jazzy Jeff & the Fresh Prince
- Released: May 19, 1998
- Recorded: 1985–1997
- Genres: Hip-hop; golden age hip-hop
- Labels: Jive; BMG

DJ Jazzy Jeff & the Fresh Prince chronology
Code Red (1993)	Greatest Hits (1998)	Before The Willennium (2000)

Professional ratings
Review scores
Source	Rating
AllMusic	4.5/5 stars
Robert Christgau	(2-star Honorable Mention)

Greatest Hits is the first compilation album by DJ Jazzy Jeff & the Fresh Prince. The album includes several of the duo's biggest hits, including "Girls Ain't Nothing but Trouble", "Parents Just Don't Understand", and "Summertime". This also includes the previously unreleased track "Lovely Daze", and two solo tracks by Will Smith from his major-motion picture film, Men in Black.

== Track listing ==
=== International edition ===
1. "Boom! Shake the Room" (Album Version) – 3:48
2. "Summertime" (Album Version) – 4:31
3. "Men in Black" (Album Version) – 3:45
4. "Girls Ain't Nothing But Trouble" (1988 Extended Remix) – 4:48
5. "Twinkle, Twinkle (I'm Not a Star)" (UK Flavour Radio Edit) – 4:10
6. "The Things That U Do" (Hula Radio Remix) – 4:09
7. "I Think I Can Beat Mike Tyson" (Album Version) – 4:48
8. "Just Cruisin'" (Album Version) – 3:59
9. "Ring My Bell" (Mr. Lee's Radio Mix) – 4:04
10. "I Wanna Rock" (Radio Edit) – 4:18
11. "Parents Just Don't Understand" (Single Edit) – 5:13
12. "I'm Looking for the One (To Be with Me)" (Video Version) – 3:40
13. "A Nightmare on My Street" (Single Version) – 4:53
14. "Can't Wait to Be with You" (Brixton Flavour Radio Mix) – 3:51
15. "Brand New Funk" (Album Version) – 4:04
16. "The Fresh Prince of Bel-Air (Theme)" – 2:56

Bonus tracks (previously unreleased)

17. "Lovely Daze" (Candyhill Mix) – 4:13
18. "Megamix" (Clean Radio Edit) – 3:42

=== American edition ===
1. "Girls Ain't Nothing But Trouble" (1988 Extended Remix) – 4:48
2. "Men in Black" – 3:45
3. "Summertime" – 4:31
4. "Parents Just Don't Understand" (Single Edit) – 5:13
5. "Boom! Shake the Room" – 3:48
6. "Just Cruisin'" – 3:59
7. "Ring My Bell" (Mr. Lee's Radio Mix) – 4:04
8. "Brand New Funk" – 4:04
9. "Lovely Daze" – 4:13
10. "The Fresh Prince of Bel-Air" (Theme) – 2:56
11. "A Nightmare on My Street" (Single Version) – 4:53
12. "A Touch of Jazz" – 3:17
13. "I Think I Can Beat Mike Tyson" – 4:48
14. "The Magnificent Jazzy Jeff" – 5:22
15. "I'm Looking for the One (To Be with Me)" – 3:40
16. "You Saw My Blinker" – 4:12
17. "Summertime '98" (Soulpower Remix) – 4:31
18. "Megamix" (Clean Radio Edit) – 3:42

== Charts ==
Chart performance for Greatest Hits
Chart (1998)	Peak position
Australian Albums (ARIA)	143
Canada Top Albums/CDs (RPM)	65
Dutch Albums (Album Top 100)	38
German Albums (Offizielle Top 100)	69
New Zealand Albums (RMNZ)	32
Norwegian Albums (VG-lista)	10
Scottish Albums (Official Charts)	62
Swedish Albums (Sverigetopplistan)	20
UK Albums (Official Charts)	20
UK R&B Albums (Official Charts)	2
US Billboard 200	144
US Top R&B/Hip-Hop Albums (Billboard)	93

== Certifications ==
Certifications for Greatest Hits
Region	Certification	Certified units/sales
United Kingdom (BPI)	Gold	100,000^{‡}
^{‡} Sales+streaming figures based on certification alone.
