= Boom! Shake the Room =

1993 single by DJ Jazzy Jeff & the Fresh Prince

Single by DJ Jazzy Jeff & the Fresh Prince

from the album Code Red
- B-side: "From da South"
- Released: July 16, 1993
- Genre: Pop hip-hop; swingbeat
- Length: 3:51
- Label: Jive
- Songwriters: Will Smith; Lee Haggard; Wayne Williams; Keith Mayberry; Gregory Webster; Marvin Pierce; Norman Napier; Walter Morrison; Ralph Middlebrooks; Marshall Jones; Leroy Bonner; Andrew Noland
- Producer: Mr. Lee

DJ Jazzy Jeff & the Fresh Prince singles chronology
"I Wanna Rock" (1993)	"Boom! Shake the Room" (1993)	"I'm Looking for the One (To Be with Me)" (1993)

Audio sample
- file; help

Music video
- "Boom! Shake the Room" on YouTube

"Boom! Shake the Room" is a song by American hip-hop duo DJ Jazzy Jeff & the Fresh Prince. The track samples the 1973 song "Funky Worm" by the Ohio Players. Released on July 16, 1993, by Jive Records as the second single from the duo's fifth studio album, Code Red (1993), the single peaked at number 13 on the US Billboard Hot 100 and topped the charts of Australia, Ireland, Spain, and the United Kingdom. Its music video was directed by American film director Scott Kalvert, featuring the duo performing onstage in front of a live crowd.

== Critical reception ==
Larry Flick from Billboard magazine described "Boom! Shake the Room" as a "butt-shaggin' pop/hip-hop romp", remarking that the "highly danceable jam has a shouted, air-punching chorus that should work well in a live environment." Troy J. Augusto from Cash Box felt it "slams harder than any single this duo has so far produced", noting that the "groovin' track boasts sing-a-long chorus that'll make Hammer blush for sure". Dave Sholin from the Gavin Report said, "With the success Will Smith's had as The Fresh Prince of Bel-Air, he and Jazzy Jeff will probably do more than just "shake the room" at some stations. School is out for summer and the duo's latest has potential to light up those request lines." Australian music channel Max included it in their list of "1000 Greatest Songs of All Time" in 2018. Upon the release, Music & Media wrote, "It looks like they're having a party on the border between hip hoponia and the land of swingbeat. Shake it, don't fake it!"

In their review of Code Red, the magazine added, "Like Snoop Doggy Dogg these two rappers know how to shake dancefloors and the airwaves alike. Over the last weeks nobody could resist shouting along with their rhymes. Regardless of age group, everybody knew the magic words: Boom! Shake shake shake the room, tick tick tick tick boom!" James Hamilton from Music Week's RM Dance Update named it a "'Jump Around' type ultra frenetic jaunty rap jiggler". Wendi Cermak from The Network Forty wrote, "Here we have a song that everyone who's anyone is talking about. Currently in heavy rotation in On the Tip, this jam has picked up over 300 plays in its first week!" Simon Williams from NME deemed it "a poor man's 'Shamrocks and Shenanigans (Boom Shalock Lock Boom)' and hence is a waste of a damn good title." Gavin Reeve from Smash Hits gave it a top score of five out of five, named it Best New Single and described it as "power rap". He concluded that "Boom! Shake the Room" "will be exploding on turntables everywhere this summer."

== Commercial performance ==
In North America, "Boom! Shake the Room" peaked at numbers 13 on the US Billboard Hot 100, number 12 on the Cash Box Top 100, number 21 on the Billboard Hot R&B Singles chart, and number six on the Billboard Maxi-Singles Sales chart. In Oceania, it topped Australia's ARIA Singles Chart for one week in January 1994 and peaked at number two in New Zealand for two weeks in November and December 1993.

In Europe, "Boom! Shake the Room" topped the charts of Ireland, Spain, and the UK. In the latter country, it peaked atop the UK Singles Chart on September 19, 1993, during its third week on the chart, becoming Smith's first and Townes' only chart-topping song in Britain. The song spent two weeks at the top and 15 weeks within the UK top 100, including two weeks on the chart again in 1995 (number 40 and 57). It also peaked within the top 10 of the charts in Denmark, Germany, and Switzerland, as well as on the European Hot 100, on which it peaked at number seven in October 1993. It debuted on the chart at number 55 on September 18, after charting in the Netherlands and UK. On the European Dance Radio Chart, it reached number four. Additionally, the single was a top-20 hit in Austria, the Netherlands, and Sweden. The song earned a gold record in Germany and the United States, a silver record in the United Kingdom, and a platinum record in Australia and New Zealand.

== Track listings ==
- UK CD1
1. "Boom! Shake the Room" (LP version) – 3:51
2. "Boom! Shake the Room" (club radio mix) – 3:55
3. "Boom! Shake the Room" (Street remix) – 4:30
4. "Boom! Shake the Room" (Mr. Lee's club mix) – 5:02
5. "Boom! Shake the Room" (Mr. Lee's extended club mix) – 5:55
6. "Boom! Shake the Room" (LP instrumental) – 4:12
7. "Boom! Shake the Room" (Street Remix Bonus Beats) – 4:17
- UK CD2
1. "Boom! Shake the Room" (LP version) - 3:51
2. "Summertime" (7-inch mix) – 3:57
3. "Parents Just Don't Understand" (single remix) – 2:59
4. "Girls Ain't Nothing but Trouble" (shorter single edit) – 3:58
- Cassette single
1. "Boom! Shake the Room" (LP version) – 3:51
2. "Summertime" (7-inch mix) – 3:57
- European single
1. "Boom! Shake the Room" (LP version) – 3:51
2. "From Da South" – 3:14
- UK 1995 re-issue
1. "Boom! Shake the Room" (Hula's tadio temix) – 3:35
2. "Boom! Shake the Room" (LP version) – 3:51
3. "Boom! Shake the Room" (Street remix) – 4:30
4. "Boom! Shake the Room" (Hula's dub) – 5:31
5. "Boom! Shake the Room" (Club radio mix) – 3:55
6. "Boom! Shake the Room" (Mr. Lee's club mix) – 5:02
7. "Boom! Shake the Room" (Hula's extended remix) – 6:09

== Charts ==
=== Weekly charts ===
1993–1994 weekly chart performance for "Boom! Shake the Room"
Charts (1993–1994)	Peak position
Australia (ARIA)	1
Austria (Ö3 Austria Top 40)	17
Belgium (Ultratop 50 Flanders)	36
Denmark (IFPI)	6
Europe (Eurochart Hot 100)	7
Europe (European Dance Radio)	4
Europe (European Hit Radio)	27
France (SNEP)	24
Germany (GfK)	8
Ireland (IRMA)	1
Israel (Israeli Singles Chart)	13
Netherlands (Dutch Top 40)	19
Netherlands (Single Top 100)	18
New Zealand (Recorded Music NZ)	2
Spain (AFYVE)	1
Sweden (Sverigetopplistan)	12
Switzerland (Schweizer Hitparade)	8
UK Singles (Official Charts)	1
UK Airplay (Music Week)	12
UK Dance (Music Week)	1
UK Club Chart (Music Week)	23
US Billboard Hot 100	13
US Dance Club Songs (Billboard)	36
US Dance Singles Sales (Billboard)	6
US Hot R&B/Hip-Hop Songs (Billboard)	21
US Hot Rap Songs (Billboard)	23
US Rhythmic Airplay (Billboard)	23
US Cash Box Top 100	12

1995 weekly chart performance for "Boom! Shake the Room"
Charts (1995)	Peak position
Scotland (Official Charts)	55
UK Singles (Official Charts)	40
UK Dance (OCC)	33
UK Club Chart (Music Week)	66

2013 weekly chart performance for "Boom! Shake the Room"
Charts (2013)	Peak position
UK Hip Hop/R&B Singles (OCC)	25

=== Year-end charts ===
1993 year-end chart performance for "Boom! Shake the Room"
Chart (1993)	Position
Australia (ARIA)	18
Europe (Eurochart Hot 100)	50
Germany (Media Control)	79
Netherlands (Dutch Top 40)	111
Netherlands (Single Top 100)	85
New Zealand (RIANZ)	20
Sweden (Topplistan)	35
UK Singles (OCC)	16
UK Airplay (Music Week)	50
US Billboard Hot 100	75

1994 year-end chart performance for "Boom! Shake the Room"
Chart (1994)	Position
Australia (ARIA)	36
Europe (Eurochart Hot 100)	93

== Certifications ==
Certifications and sales for "Boom! Shake the Room"
Region	Certification	Certified units/sales
Australia (ARIA)	Platinum	70,000^{^}
Germany (BVMI)	Gold	250,000^{^}
New Zealand (RMNZ)	Platinum	10,000^{*}
United Kingdom (BPI)	Silver	200,000^{^}
United States (RIAA)	Gold	600,000
^{*} Sales figures based on certification alone.^{^} Shipments figures based on certification alone.

== Release history ==
Release dates and formats for "Boom! Shake the Room"
Region	Date	Format(s)	Label(s)	Ref.
United States	July 16, 1993	12-inch vinyl; CD; cassette	Jive	
United Kingdom	August 30, 1993	7-inch vinyl; 12-inch vinyl; CD	Jive	
Australia	September 20, 1993	12-inch vinyl; CD; cassette	Jive	
Japan	October 21, 1993	CD	Jive	
