= A Touch of Jazz =

A Touch of Jazz may refer to:

- "A Touch of Jazz (Playin' Kinda Ruff Part II)", 1982 song by Zapp
- "A Touch of Jazz", 1987 song by DJ Jazzy Jeff & The Fresh Prince from the album Rock the House
  - A Touch of Jazz, production company founded DJ Jazzy Jeff
