= Girl Trouble =

Girl Trouble may refer to:

== Film and television ==
- Girl Trouble (1942 film), an American film
- What's Good for the Goose, a 1969 British film also known as Girl Trouble
- "Girl Trouble" (Will & Grace), TV episode

== Music ==
- Girl Trouble (band)
- "Girl Trouble", a song from the 1991 album Why Do Birds Sing? by the Violent Femmes

== Other ==
- Girl Trouble (book)

== See also ==
- "Girls Ain't Nothing but Trouble", song
