= The Things That U Do =

Single by DJ Jazzy Jeff & the Fresh Prince

from the album Homebase
- Released: November 27, 1991
- Recorded: 1991
- Genre: Hip-hop; new jack swing
- Length: 3:56
- Label: Jive; RCA
- Songwriters: Jeffrey Townes; Will Smith
- Producers: Hula & K. Fingers

DJ Jazzy Jeff & the Fresh Prince singles chronology
| "Ring My Bell" (1991) | "The Things That U Do" (1991) | "You Saw My Blinker" (1992) |

Music video
- "The Things That U Do" on YouTube

"The Things That U Do" is a song by American hip-hop duo DJ Jazzy Jeff & the Fresh Prince, released in November 1991, by Jive and RCA Records, as the third single from their fourth studio album, Homebase (1991). It spent a week at number 43 on the US Billboard R&B Chart, though it failed to chart on the Billboard Hot 100.

== Track listing ==
- CD single
1. "The Things That U Do" (Radio Remix) - 3:38
2. "The Things That U Do" (Totally Bumpin' Vocal) - 6:13
3. "The Things That U Do" (House Mix) - 5:30
4. "The Things That U Do" (Underground Mix) - 7:12
- 7" vinyl
1. "The Things That U Do" - 3:56
2. "The Things That U Do" (House Mix) - 5:30
- 12-inch vinyl
1. "The Things That U Do" (Club Mix) - 6:44
2. "The Things That U Do" (Radio Remix) - 3:38
3. "The Things That U Do" (Totally Bumpin' Vocal) - 6:13
4. "The Things That U Do" (LP Version) - 3:56
5. "The Things That U Do" (House Mix) - 5:30
6. "The Things That U Do" (Underground Mix) - 7:12
7. "Vic's Drum Interlude" - 1:03

== Charts ==
| Chart (1992) | Peak position |
|---|---|
| Australia (ARIA) | 109 |
| US Hot R&B Singles (Billboard) | 43 |
