= Dust Yourself Off =

Studio album by Pleasure
- Released: July 1975
- Recorded: October 1974 – February 1975 at Fantasy Studios, Berkeley, California
- Genre: Soul
- Label: Fantasy Records
- Producer: Wayne Henderson

Pleasure chronology
Dust Yourself Off (1975)	Accept No Substitutes (1976)

Professional ratings
Review scores
Source	Rating
Allmusic	3/5 stars

Dust Yourself Off is the debut album by Portland, Oregon-based R&B group Pleasure, released in 1975 and produced by Wayne Henderson of The Crusaders. It also includes a funked-up cover of Maria Muldaur's hit "Midnight at the Oasis". The song "Bouncy Lady" appeared in the video game Grand Theft Auto V, on The Lowdown 91.1, an in-game soul music radio station.

== Track listing ==
1. "Dust Yourself Off" - (Donald Hepburn) 3:50
2. "Reality" - (Malon McClain) 5:00
3. "My Love" - (Marlon McClain) 4:02
4. "Midnight at the Oasis" - (David Nichtern) 3:26
5. "Music is My Life" - (Marlon McClain) 4:10
6. "Plastic People" - (Marlon McClain) 3:58
7. "Bouncy Lady" - (Donald Hepburn) 3:55
8. "What is Slick" - (Dan Brewster) 5:10
9. "Straight Ahead" - (Marlon McClain) 5:32

== Personnel ==
- Marlon "The Magician" McClain - Guitar, Lead Vocals, Backing Vocals
- Sherman Davis - Lead Vocals
- Bruce Carter - Drums
- Nathaniel Phillips - Electric Bass, Backing Vocals
- Dan Brewster - Trombone, Backing Vocals
- Donald Hepburn - Backing Vocals
- Dennis Springer - Tenor Saxophone
- Joe Sample - Piano (Acoustic), Electric Piano (Fender Rhodes), Clavinet, Synthesizer (Arp)
- Dan Mason - Baritone Saxophone
- Bruce Smith - Congas, Bongos, Percussion (Flexitone, P.o. Rhythm Box), Cowbell, Backing Vocals
- Dick Burdell, Thara Memory - Trumpet

== Charts ==
Chart (1975)	Peak position
US Top Soul Albums	54

== Samples ==
- "Bouncy Lady"
  - "Brand New Funk"" by DJ Jazzy Jeff & the Fresh Prince on their He's the DJ, I'm the Rapper album
- "Reality"
  - "Church"" by De La Soul on their The Grind Date album
