= Konee Rok =

- Origin: Chicago, Illinois U.S.
- Genres: Hip hop/Rap Music
- Occupation: Music video director
- Years active: 1999–present
- Website: Official website:

Konee Rok is an American music video and documentary director. He has done film and video work with many popular artists in hip-hop, rap music and break dancing culture.

He has directed music videos, documentaries and commercials featuring Grammy Award winner Rhymefest, Kanye West, Raekwon, rapper Cassidy, Little Jon, DJ Jazzy Jeff of the Fresh Prince and Phife Dawg of A Tribe Called Quest. His documentary on MC Juice tells the story behind the freestyle M.C.'s battle against rapper Eminem. He directed the Chicago street gang film Trust None with Psychodrama and Crucial Conflict.

He also has directed numerous video projects in the underground hip hop and break dancing community. Konee Rok is a member of the b-boy/breakdance crew, Chicago Tribe.

== Recent work ==
On March 17, 2020 Konee Rok collaborated with Adobe to create the animated music video for DJ Aktive's "The City" featuring Common, DJ Jazzy Jeff, Freeway & Bri Steves. Co-produced by Ivan Barias. The video is a vibrant homage to the cities that each musician holds dear to their hearts, specifically Chicago and Philadelphia, including the people, places, and iconic images for which each city is known. Chicago native, Konee Rok completed this cinematic animated video by himself in only two months. Konee's use of animation in a cinematic way is what really makes this project one of a kind. The result is a stunning piece that gives the viewer a glimpse into how each city has helped to mold each artist's journey. For the visual, each MC takes a journey through their hometown. Freeway's journey is inspired by the history of the city and his own highs and lows, including his kidney transplant and an homage to the legendary film character Rocky. Bri Steves takes a long walk through Philly before taking the train to Chicago. In the Windy City, Common gives us the 10 cent tour of all the city's landmarks. Aktive shows where the city has taken him with a short scene of him on tour with Janet Jackson. Finally, the clip ends with the legendary DJ Jazzy Jeff making the earth move like he makes the turntables groove, representing the influence of the city of Philadelphia on the world. "The City video is a great visual with amazing animation that brings the song that Common, DJ Jazzy Jeff, Freeway, Bri-Steves and I created to life." says DJ Aktive. Common shares. "I love how this song and video represents the true culture of Hip-Hop."

On February 11, 2011 Raekwon released the Konee Rok directed music video for "Shaolin vs Wu-Tang," the title track from The Chef's upcoming album of the same name. The video features a hybrid of cartoon martial artistry with live action of Raekwon laying down his vocals.

In late November, 2012 singer Chrisette Michele debuted the Konee Rok directed music video for her song "Can the Cool Be Loved?" featuring Dunson and Bilal. Chrisette Michele gave an explanation about the clip, offering, "A fun lil Audiovisual Presentation Konee Rok and I drummed up. The concept is "Prisoner of a Still Picture" Dunson and I are stuck in the iconic photography of Audrey and the great Sir Davis. We pose in these lyrics, the question, "Can The Cool Be Loved?" From our Art to Yours... Enjoy.".

In early February 2014, Phife Dawg of A Tribe Called Quest premiered the Konee Rok directed music video "Dear Dilla"; produced by Dj Rasta Root. The song which pays homage to legendary Hip Hop producer J Dilla, is Phife's first solo release in 14 years and it is the first single off of his upcoming album MUTTYmorphosis. The clip finds Phife paying homage the best way he knows how, sharing some of his bars, and his memories of the legend, while supplying a nice set of visuals that match each bar specifically. The video tribute gives the sentiment a colorful upgrade as the "5 Footer" shoots his scenes everywhere from Atlanta to Dilla's hometown of Detroit to give the lyrics an organic feel. "Dear Dilla" was filmed in Chicago as well as two days in J. Dilla's hometown of Detroit. The video was #1 on "The Wrap Up: Hip-Hop Wired's Top 10 Videos Of The Week" for the week of February 14, 2014.
