= The Fresh Prince of Bel-Air theme song =

1992 single by DJ Jazzy Jeff & the Fresh Prince

"Yo Home to Bel-Air"
- Artwork for Dutch and German releases

Single by DJ Jazzy Jeff & the Fresh Prince

from the album Greatest Hits
- Released: September 21, 1992
- Recorded: 1990
- Genre: Hip-hop
- Length: 2:58
- Label: Jive
- Songwriters: Willard Smith, Jeffrey Townes
- Producer: DJ Jazzy Jeff

DJ Jazzy Jeff & the Fresh Prince singles chronology
"The Things That U Do" (1992)	"Yo Home to Bel-Air" (1992)	"I Wanna Rock" (1992)

"Yo Home to Bel-Air", alternately titled as "The Fresh Prince of Bel-Air (Theme)" or merely "The Fresh Prince of Bel-Air", is a song by DJ Jazzy Jeff & the Fresh Prince first heard in 1990 as the theme song to the NBC sitcom The Fresh Prince of Bel-Air. The lyrics were composed by rapper and sitcom star Will Smith, performing under his stage name the Fresh Prince, and the song was produced by Jeffrey Townes under his stage name DJ Jazzy Jeff.

After series composer and producer Quincy Jones pitched an early version of the music, Townes suggested that he and Smith could produce the series' theme song. Smith wrote the lyrics after reading scripts from the pilot episode.

The song was released as a single in the Netherlands and Spain by Jive Records in 1992, with "Parents Just Don't Understand" as its B-side, and it was re-released in 2016 by the record label Enjoy the Ride. It peaked at number three in the Netherlands and number two in Spain, and it received a Silver sales certification in the United Kingdom in February 2018. The song appeared on DJ Jazzy Jeff & The Fresh Prince's Greatest Hits album, along with a number of compilation albums. Unlike the version in the sitcom, it samples George Benson's "Give Me the Night".

== Theme ==
Lyrically, the song is storytelling narrative, describing how its protagonist was "born and raised" in West Philadelphia, but after a violent encounter during a streetball game, he was sent to live with family in Bel Air, Los Angeles. As one account maintains, the protagonist "raps about his mother sending him to live with his aunt and uncle because she was afraid that he would fall victim to [his] tough West Philadelphia neighborhood". It has been described as an example of the tendency of rappers to "present pathological perspectives of their own communities". The song "explains how a boy from the ghetto would end up living in Bel-Air", and thereby "ushers in a fantasy" of an implausible scenario in which a poor person escapes to wealth.

== Reception ==
The single was released exclusively in the Netherlands and Spain in 1992. In the former country, it spent 10 weeks on the Dutch Top 40, peaking at number three. In Spain, it debuted at number two, its peak, and stayed in the top 20 for seven weeks. Although it was not released in the United Kingdom, the song earned a Silver sales certification from the British Phonographic Industry in February 2018 for sales and streams of over 200,000.

An article on the MTV.co.uk website stated about the song, "Say what you want, but considering the sitcom wrapped up over 20 years ago and people are still able to start spitting out those lyrics on cue, its lasting appeal is undeniably impressive." Tom Eames of Digital Spy ranked the song 3rd in a list of 25 sitcom theme songs. and Rolling Stone readers ranked the song 6th out of a list of 10 television theme songs.

== Single track listing ==
=== 7" vinyl ===
A-side – "Yo Home to Bel-Air" (7" Radio Mix) – 3:23
B-side – "Parents Just Don't Understand" – 5:12

=== 12" vinyl ===
A-side

1. "Yo Home to Bel Air" (Extended Version) – 5:18
2. "Yo Home to Bel Air" (7" Radio Mix) – 3:23

B-side

1. "Yo Home to Bel Air" (Summertime Mix) – 5:25
2. "The Fresh Prince of Bel-Air" – 2:57

=== CD single ===
1. "Yo Home to Bel Air" (7" Radio Mix) – 3:23
2. "Parents Just Don't Understand" – 5:18

== Charts ==
=== Weekly charts ===
Chart (1992–1994)	Peak position
Netherlands (Dutch Top 40)	3
Netherlands (Single Top 100)	4
Spain (AFYVE)	2

=== Year-end charts ===
Chart (1992)	Position
Netherlands (Dutch Top 40)	34
Netherlands (Single Top 100)	82

== Certifications ==
Region	Certification	Certified units/sales
United Kingdom (BPI)	Gold	400,000^{‡}
^{‡} Sales+streaming figures based on certification alone.
