= Lovely Daze =

Single by DJ Jazzy Jeff & the Fresh Prince

from the album Greatest Hits
- Released: September 1998
- Recorded: 1992
- Genre: Hip-hop
- Length: 3:59
- Label: Jive
- Songwriters: Smith; Townes; Hula; K. Fingers
- Producers: Hula; K. Fingers

DJ Jazzy Jeff & the Fresh Prince singles chronology
"Twinkle Twinkle (I'm Not a Star)" (1994)	"Lovely Daze" (1998)

"Lovely Daze" is the second and final single taken from DJ Jazzy Jeff & the Fresh Prince's sixth album, Greatest Hits. The song was produced by Chicago-based producers Hula & K. Fingers and became the duo's last single, released in September 1998. Background vocals by Lidell "NuNu" Townsell & Anthony Stewart.

== Track listing ==
CD single

1. "Lovely Daze" (T.L.A.C Remix) – 4:23
2. "Summertime '98" (Soul Power Remix) – 4:15
3. "Lovely Daze" (Candyhill Mix) – 3:59
4. "A Touch of Jazz" (Album Version) – 3:40

12" vinyl

1. "Lovely Daze" (T.L.A.C Remix) – 3:40
2. "Lovely Daze" (Candyhill Mix) – 3:59
3. "Summertime '98" (Soul Power Remix) – 4:15
4. "A Touch of Jazz" (Album Version) – 3:40
