= He's the DJ, I'm the Rapper =

Studio album by DJ Jazzy Jeff & the Fresh Prince
- Released: March 29, 1988
- Recorded: 1987
- Studios: Battery, London, UK; Studio 4, Philadelphia
- Genre: Hip-hop
- Length: 72:19 (CD); 85:10 (vinyl and cassette)
- Labels: Jive; RCA
- Producers: DJ Jazzy Jeff; The Fresh Prince; Pete "Q" Harris; Bryan "Chuck" New

DJ Jazzy Jeff & the Fresh Prince chronology
| Rock the House (1987) | He's the DJ, I'm the Rapper (1988) | And in This Corner... (1989) |

Singles from He's the DJ, I'm the Rapper
- 1. "Brand New Funk" Released: December 2, 1987; 2. "Parents Just Don't Understand" Released: February 17, 1988; 3. "A Nightmare on My Street" Released: August 1, 1988

Professional ratings
Review scores
| Source | Rating |
|---|---|
| AllMusic | 5/5 stars |
| Christgau's Consumer Guide | B− |
| Pitchfork | 7.2/10 |
| Sputnikmusic | 4/5 |

He's the DJ, I'm the Rapper (also known as I'm the Rapper, He's the DJ due to the way the title is printed) is the second studio album by the American hip-hop duo DJ Jazzy Jeff & the Fresh Prince. Originally released on March 29, 1988 by Jive Records, it was the first double album in hip-hop, and was the eighth rap album to become a platinum album.

The album was certified triple platinum by the Recording Industry Association of America (RIAA) on February 1, 1995, and is the duo's most successful album. In 1998, the album was selected as one of The Source magazine's 100 Best Rap Albums.

== Singles ==
The album's first single, "Brand New Funk", was only released promotionally and, thus, failed to achieve any commercial success. However, the album's second single, "Parents Just Don't Understand", won the first-ever Grammy Award for Best Rap Performance at the 31st Annual Grammy Awards and reached number 12 on the US Billboard Hot 100. Although the album's third single, "Nightmare on My Street", which reached number 15 on the US Billboard Hot 100, was considered for inclusion in the movie A Nightmare on Elm Street 4: The Dream Master, the producers of the film decided against its inclusion. As a result, later vinyl pressings of the album contain a disclaimer sticker that says, "[This song] is not part of the soundtrack...and is not authorized, licensed, or affiliated with the Nightmare on Elm Street films."

== Track listings ==
=== Original vinyl and cassette release ===
While released as a double album, Sides C and D were labeled as "Bonus Scratch Album."

Side A
| No. | Title | Writer(s) | Length |
|---|---|---|---|
| 1. | "A Nightmare on My Street" | Will Smith; Jeffrey Townes; Pete Harris | 6:08 |
| 2. | "Here We Go Again" | Smith; Townes; Harris | 4:01 |
| 3. | "Brand New Funk" | Smith; Townes | 4:04 |
| 4. | "Time to Chill" | Smith; Townes | 4:25 |
| 5. | "Charlie Mack (First Out of the Limo)" | Smith; Townes | 4:46 |

Side B
| No. | Title | Writer(s) | Length |
|---|---|---|---|
| 6. | "As We Go" | Smith; Townes | 6:00 |
| 7. | "Parents Just Don't Understand" | Smith; Townes; Harris | 5:35 |
| 8. | "Pump Up the Bass" | Smith; Townes | 5:13 |
| 9. | "Let's Get Busy, Baby" | Smith; Townes; Harris | 4:06 |
| 10. | "Another Special Announcement" | Smith; Townes; Harris | 2:12 |

Side C
| No. | Title | Writer(s) | Length |
|---|---|---|---|
| 11. | "Live at Union Square, November 1986 (Live)" | Townes | 4:07 |
| 12. | "D.J. on the Wheels" | Townes | 3:36 |
| 13. | "My Buddy" | Smith; Clarence Holmes | 3:40 |
| 14. | "Rhythm Trax-House Party Style" | Smith; Townes | 4:39 |

Side D
| No. | Title | Writer(s) | Length |
|---|---|---|---|
| 15. | "He's the D.J., I'm the Rapper" | Smith; Townes | 6:10 |
| 16. | "Hip Hop Dancer's Theme" | Townes | 3:48 |
| 17. | "Jazzy's in the House" | Townes | 4:10 |
| 18. | "Human Video Game" | Smith; Townes; Holmes | 5:40 |

=== Original CD release ===
On the original CD, "A Nightmare on My Street", "As We Go", "D.J. on the Wheels", and the final four songs appeared in edited form, and "Another Special Announcement" was omitted. A German edition omitted "Jazzy's in the House" and "Human Video Game" instead. On September 8, 2017, the full vinyl version was finally issued as a double CD set that was released by Real Gone Music under license from Sony Music Entertainment with bonus tracks.

| No. | Title | Length |
|---|---|---|
| 1. | "A Nightmare on My Street" | 4:56 |
| 2. | "Here We Go Again" | 4:01 |
| 3. | "Brand New Funk" | 4:04 |
| 4. | "Time to Chill" | 4:25 |
| 5. | "Charlie Mack (First Out of the Limo)" | 4:46 |
| 6. | "As We Go" | 5:35 |
| 7. | "Parents Just Don't Understand" | 5:15 |
| 8. | "Pump Up the Bass" | 5:13 |
| 9. | "Let's Get Busy, Baby" | 4:06 |
| 10. | "Live at Union Square (November 1986)" | 4:07 |
| 11. | "D.J. on the Wheels" | 2:44 |
| 12. | "My Buddy" | 3:40 |
| 13. | "Rhythm Trax (House Party Style)" | 4:39 |
| 14. | "He's the D.J., I'm the Rapper" | 4:57 |
| 15. | "Hip Hop Dancer's Theme" | 2:55 |
| 16. | "Jazzy's in the House" | 3:01 |
| 17. | "Human Video Game" | 4:14 |
| Total length: | | 72:19 |

== Samples and interpolations ==
"A Nightmare on My Street"

- Theme from A Nightmare on Elm Street by Charles Bernstein

"Here We Go Again"

- "Westchester Lady" by Bob James

"Brand New Funk"

- "Bouncy Lady" by Pleasure
- "Funky President (People It's Bad)" by James Brown
- "I Can't Live Without My Radio" by LL Cool J
- "(Fallin' Like) Dominoes" by Donald Byrd

"As We Go"

- "Impeach the President" by the Honey Drippers

"Parents Just Don't Understand"

- "Won't You Be My Friend" by Peter Frampton

"Pump Up the Bass"

- "Funky Drummer" by James Brown

"Let's Get Busy, Baby"

- "Sir Duke" by Stevie Wonder

"Time To Chill"

- "Breezin'" by George Benson

"He's the D.J., I'm the Rapper"

- "Jungle Love" by Steve Miller Band

"Live at Union Square (November 1986)"

- "Got to Be Real" by Cheryl Lynn
- "Apache" by Incredible Bongo Band
- "Dance to the Drummer's Beat" by Herman Kelly and Life

== Charts ==
=== Weekly charts ===
| Chart (1988) | Peak position |
|---|---|
| Australian Albums (ARIA) | 131 |
| Canadian Albums (RPM) | 97 |
| New Zealand Albums (RMNZ) | 47 |
| UK Albums (Official Charts) | 68 |
| US Billboard 200 | 4 |
| US Top R&B/Hip-Hop Albums (Billboard) | 5 |

=== Year-end charts ===
| Chart (1988) | Position |
|---|---|
| US Billboard 200 | 27 |
| US Top R&B/Hip-Hop Albums (Billboard) | 14 |

== Certifications ==
| Region | Certification | Certified units/sales |
|---|---|---|
| Canada (Music Canada) | Platinum | 100,000^{^} |
| United States (RIAA) | 3× Platinum | 3,000,000^{^} |
^{^} Shipments figures based on certification alone.
