= Joyous =

Studio album by Pleasure
- Released: 1977
- Recorded: 1976
- Genre: Soul; Funk
- Label: Fantasy Records
- Producer: Wayne Henderson

Pleasure chronology
Accept No Substitutes (1976)	Joyous (1977)	Get to the Feeling (1978)

Professional ratings
Review scores
Source	Rating
AllMusic	4.5/5 stars

Joyous is the third album by Portland, Oregon-based R&B group Pleasure. It was released in 1977 and produced by Wayne Henderson of The Crusaders.

== Track listing ==
1. "Joyous" 6:26
2. "Let Me Be The One" 5:11
3. "Only You" 3:20
4. "Can't Turn You Loose" 4:14
5. "Sassafras Girl" 6:46
6. "Tune In" 6:37
7. "Dance to the Music" 4:50
8. "Selim" 3:48

== Personnel ==
- Marlon "The Magician" McClain – Guitar, Backing Vocals
- Sherman Davis – Lead and Backing Vocals
- Bruce Carter – Drums
- Nathaniel Phillips – Bass, Backing Vocals
- Dan Brewster – Trombone
- Donald Hepburn, Michael Hepburn – Keyboards, Backing Vocals
- Dennis Springer – Soprano Saxophone, Tenor Saxophone
- Bruce Smith – Tambourine, Bell Tree, Cowbell, Congas, Cuica, Drums (Flexitone), Backing Vocals
- Mayo Tiano – Trombone
- Dennis Christianson, Steve Madaio – Trumpet
- Robert Carr – Baritone Saxophone
- Herman Riley – Alto Saxophone, Tenor Saxophone, Flute
- Armand Kaproff, Nathan Gershman – Cello
- Paul Shure – Violin, Concertmaster
- Alex Neiman, Allan Harshman, Pamela Goldsmith – Viola
- Betty LaMagna, Bonnie Douglas, Dorothy Wade, Israel Baker, Janet Lakatos, Nathan Kaproff, Nathan Ross, Robert Sushel, Stanley Plummer – Violin

== Charts ==
Chart (1977)	Peak position
Billboard Pop Albums	113
Billboard Top Soul Albums	34

=== Singles ===
Year	Single	Chart positions
Year	Single	US R&B
1977	"Joyous"	35
