= I'm Looking for the One (To Be with Me) =

1993 single by DJ Jazzy Jeff & the Fresh Prince

Single by DJ Jazzy Jeff & the Fresh Prince

from the album Code Red
- Released: November 8, 1993
- Length: 3:40
- Label: Jive
- Songwriters: Will Smith; Martin Smith; Teddy Riley; James Harris III, Terry Lewis
- Producer: Teddy Riley

DJ Jazzy Jeff & the Fresh Prince singles chronology
"Boom! Shake the Room" (1993)	"I'm Looking for the One (To Be with Me)" (1993)	"Can't Wait To Be With You" (1994)

Music video
- "I'm Looking for the One (To Be with Me)" on YouTube

"I'm Looking for the One (To Be with Me)" is a song by American hip-hop duo DJ Jazzy Jeff & the Fresh Prince, released in November 1993 by Jive Records as the third single from the duo's fifth studio album, Code Red (1993). The song was the follow-up to their highly successful hit single "Boom! Shake the Room" and peaked at number 79 on the US Billboard Hot 100. On the UK Singles Chart, it peaked at number 24. It samples "Tell Me If You Still Care", a song sung by the S.O.S. Band, and is written by Jimmy Jam & Terry Lewis, while Teddy Riley produced it.

== Critical reception ==
In his weekly UK chart commentary, James Masterton felt that here, the rappers are "moving back into the more laidback groove that first brought them Top 10 success in 1991 with 'Summertime' and although probably destined not to be as big as the last hit, it stands a chance of becoming Top 20 next week." Alan Jones from Music Week described it as "a slower rap track that samples the S.O.S. Band's 'Tell Me If You Still Care', and includes some nice vocoder work. The more gentle style works well, and the Fresh Prince's rap nicely disses gangsta rap. Not another number one, but strong enough to reach the Top 10."

Pan-European magazine Music & Media wrote that it's "not unlike" 'I Want to Be Your Man' by Roger Troutman. David Quantick from NME constated that the duo return with "a '70s groove", adding that Fresh Prince's pop grooves are the "exact equivalent" of The Fresh Prince of Bel Air. James Hamilton from the Record Mirror Dance Update called it a "Teddy Riley produced languid Zapp-style vocodered sinuous thigh twiner". Alex Kadis from Smash Hits gave "I'm Looking for the One (To Be with Me)" four out of five, writing, "Smoochier than 'Boom', this has precise lyrical rap, funky chunky beats and strong clear vocals. Dead sexy too."

== Track listings ==
- 12-inch vinyl
1. "I'm Looking for the One (To Be with Me)" (12-inch mix) – 5:25
2. "I'm Looking for the One (To Be with Me)" (LP version) – 4:35
3. "I'm Looking for the One (To Be with Me)" (video version) – 3:40
4. "Get Hyped" - 4:38
- US CD single
1. "I'm Looking for the One (To Be with Me)" (video version) – 3:40
2. "I'm Looking for the One (To Be with Me)" (single edit) – 4:05
3. "I'm Looking for the One (To Be with Me)" (LP version) – 4:35
4. "I'm Looking for the One (To Be with Me)" (12-inch mix) – 5:25
5. "I'm Looking for the One (To Be with Me)" (instrumental) – 3:40
6. "I'm Looking for the One (To Be with Me)" (Peracapella) – 5:25
- UK CD single
1. "I'm Looking for the One (To Be with Me)" (video version) – 3:40
2. "I'm Looking for the One (To Be with Me)" (LP version) – 4:35
3. "I'm Looking for the One (To Be with Me)" (12-inch mix) – 5:25
4. "Get Hyped" - 4:38
- European Snap-Pack single and cassette single
1. "I'm Looking for the One (To Be with Me)" (video version) – 3:40
2. "Get Hyped" – 4:38

== Charts ==
Chart (1993–1994)	Peak position
Australia (ARIA)	48
Europe (Eurochart Hot 100)	70
Europe (European Dance Radio)	14
Germany (GfK)	88
Netherlands (Single Top 100)	36
New Zealand (Recorded Music NZ)	18
UK Singles (OCC)	24
UK Airplay (Music Week)	15
UK Dance (Music Week)	11
UK Club Chart (Music Week)	35
US Billboard Hot 100	79
US Dance Singles Sales (Billboard)	43
US Hot R&B/Hip-Hop Songs (Billboard)	51
US Hot Rap Songs (Billboard)	18
US R&B/Hip-Hop Airplay (Billboard)	70

== Release history ==
Region	Date	Format(s)	Label(s)	Ref.
United Kingdom	November 8, 1993	7-inch vinyl; 12-inch vinyl; CD; cassette	Jive	
Australia	January 17, 1994	12-inch vinyl; CD; cassette	Jive	
