= Future Now =

Album by Pleasure

Studio album by Pleasure
- Released: 1979
- Recorded: 1979
- Genre: Funk; soul; funk rock; jazz fusion
- Label: Fantasy Records
- Producer: Pleasure; Marlon McClain; Phil Kaffel

Pleasure chronology
Get to the Feeling (1978)	Future Now (1979)	Special Things (1980)

Professional ratings
Review scores
Source	Rating
AllMusic	4/5 stars

Future Now is the fifth album by Portland, Oregon-based R&B group Pleasure, released in 1979. It includes the top-ten R&B hit "Glide".

== Track listing ==
1. "Departure" – 0:44
2. "Future Now" – 5:34
3. "Universal" – 3:17
4. "Space Is the Place" – 4:10
5. "Strong Love" – 4:42
6. "The Real Thing" – 5:40
7. "Nothin' to It" – 4:07
8. "Thoughts of Old Flames" – 4:11
9. "Glide" – 6:24
10. "Dedication to the Past" – 0:38

== Personnel ==
- Nathaniel Phillips – Electric bass, "Sok" bass, backing vocals
- Michael Hepburn - Keyboards, lead and backing vocals
- Donald Hepburn - Keyboards, backing vocals
- Bruce Carter – Drums
- Larry Williams – Alto saxophone, soprano saxophone
- Sherman Davis – Lead and backing vocals
- Marlon "The Magician" McClain – Electric guitar, acoustic guitar, backing vocals
- Dennis Springer – Soprano saxophone
- Jerry Hey – Trumpet
- Clydene Jackson, Julia Tillman Waters, Maxine Willard Waters, Pat Henderson – Backing vocals

== Charts ==
Chart (1979)	Peak position
Billboard Top LPs & Tape	67
Billboard Top Soul Albums	13
