= Accept No Substitutes =

Studio album by Pleasure
- Released: 1976
- Recorded: 1976
- Studio: Fantasy Studios, Berkeley, California; The Record Plant, Sausalito, California
- Genre: Soul; Funk
- Label: Fantasy
- Producer: Wayne Henderson

Pleasure chronology
Dust Yourself Off (1975)	Accept No Substitutes (1976)	Joyous (1977)

Professional ratings
Review scores
Source	Rating
Allmusic	4/5 stars

Accept No Substitutes is the second album by Portland, Oregon-based R&B group Pleasure. It was released in 1976 and produced by jazz trombonist Wayne Henderson of The Crusaders.

== Track listing ==
1. "Let's Dance" – 5:01
2. "I'm Mad" – 3:10
3. "Pleasure For Your Pleasure" – 3:47
4. "We Have So Much" – 3:29
5. "Jammin' With Pleasure" – 2:26
6. "Ghettos Of The Mind" – 5:05
7. "The Love Of My Life" – 4:05
8. "Theme For The Moonchild" – 5:25
9. "2 For 1" – 4:22

== Personnel ==
- Marlon "The Magician" McClain - guitar, lead and backing vocals
- Sherman Davis - lead and backing vocals
- Bruce Carter - drums
- Nathaniel Phillips - electric bass, backing vocals
- Dan Brewster - trombone
- Donald Hepburn - keyboards, backing vocals
- Dennis Springer - soprano saxophone, tenor saxophone
- Bruce Smith - congas, bell tree, Flexitone drums, cabasa, bells, tambourine, backing vocals, bird call effects
- Jerry Peters - electric piano, Clavinet
- Michael Hepburn - electric piano, string ensemble
- Oscar Brashear - trumpet, flugelhorn
- Augie Johnson, Sylvia Nabors - backing vocals

== Charts ==
Chart (1976)	Peak position
Billboard Pop Albums	162
Billboard Top Soul Albums	32

=== Singles ===
Year	Single	Chart positions
Year	Single	U.S. Billboard Hot 100
1976	"Ghettos Of The Mind"	71
