= Get to the Feeling =

Studio album by Pleasure
- Released: 1978
- Recorded: 1978
- Studio: Total Experience, Hollywood, California; ABC, Los Angeles, California
- Genre: Soul; Funk
- Label: Fantasy Records
- Producer: Wayne Henderson

Pleasure chronology
Joyous (1977)	Get to the Feeling (1978)	Future Now (1979)

Professional ratings
Review scores
Source	Rating
AllMusic	2/5 stars

Get to the Feeling is the fourth album by Portland, Oregon-based R&B group Pleasure, released in 1978. It was produced by jazz legend Wayne Henderson of The Crusaders.

== Track listing ==
1. "Celebrate the Good Things" 3:26
2. "Foxy Lady" 3:30
3. "Ladies' Night Out" 4:38
4. "Happiness" 3:47
5. "Get to the Feeling" 4:21
6. "Farewell, Goodbye" 4:55
7. "Your Love Means Life (Memories)" 5:02
8. "Thanks for Everything" 4:23
9. "No Matter What" 4:55

== Personnel ==
- Marlon "The Magician" McClain - Guitar, backing vocals
- Michael Hepburn - Keyboards, lead and backing vocals
- Donald Hepburn - Keyboards, backing vocals
- Nathaniel Phillips - Bass, backing vocals
- Sherman Davis - Lead vocals
- Bruce Carter - Drums
- Bruce Smith - Percussion
- Dennis Springer - Soprano saxophone, tenor saxophone

== Charts ==
Chart (1978)	Peak position
Billboard Pop Albums	119
Billboard Top Soul Albums	42
