= Merna (singer) =

Palestinian-Canadian singer, songwriter, and producer

- Born: Merna Bishouty
- Origin: Toronto, Canada
- Genres: Soul, R&B, hip-hop, pop
- Occupations: Singer, songwriter, producer
- Years active: 2008–present
- Website: www.theartistmerna.com

Merna Bishouty, professionally known as Merna, is a Palestinian-Canadian singer, songwriter, and producer based in Toronto, Ontario. She is known for her solo work as well as for writing and producing across R&B, hip-hop, and pop. She has also released music under the alias Ayah.

== Songwriting and production career ==
Bishouty was born in Jordan, and after moving around different countries settled in Canada. Initially she released music under the Ayah moniker. This included collaborations with artists such as eLZhi, Robert Strauss, and Slakah the Beatchild. Her 2010 release with DJ Jazzy Jeff, "Xmas Time", was a considered by an NPR review as "refreshing, a modern soulful approach to music of the season". Bishouty subsequently changed her alias to Merna, and released her debut album under that name in 2015. The Calling was reviewed by Claire Ashton in Bitch Magazine as "compelling music".

She has also emerged as a writer, penning songs for artists such as JoJo, Rapsody, Baby Rose, Cory Henry, Khamari, Charlotte Day Wilson, Syd, and Demi Lovato.

In 2025, Merna released the 4 track extended player record "Ours To Keep: Side A". A critical review in the Earmilk webzine stated it was "reminiscent of early-career Aretha Franklin".

== Musical style and themes ==
Merna's solo music is noted for blending soul, R&B, and spiritual undertones, often informed by her heritage and classical piano background.
