= Hip-Hop Forever III =

Compilation album by DJ Jazzy Jeff
- Released: October 16, 2006
- Genre: Hip-hop
- Label: BBE Records
- Producer: DJ Jazzy Jeff; DJ Premier; J-Live; Grap Luva; Jay Dee; Da Beatminerz; Main Source; M. Hall; DJ Spinna; Havoc; Eric B & Rakim; Black Sheep; Rockwilder; Ron Browz; Vinyl Reanimators; Howie Tee; Saukrates

DJ Jazzy Jeff chronology
Hip Hop Forever II (2004)	Hip-Hop Forever III (2006)	The Return Of The Magnificent EP (2007)

Hip-Hop Forever III is the third compilation album in the "Hip-Hop Forever" series by DJ Jazzy Jeff, an American hip-hop producer. The mix is available with or without an accompanying unmixed disc containing the same tracks.

== Track listing ==
=== Disc one: DJ Mix ===
1. "Tear Shit Up"
  - Performed by Biz Markie
  - Featuring DJ Jazzy Jeff
2. "Passing Me By"
  - Performed by Pharcyde
3. "Whatever You Say"
  - Performed by Little Brother
4. "IJusWannaChill"
  - Performed by Large Professor
5. "Top Ten List"
  - Performed by Masta Ace
6. "Visualize"
  - Performed by Mr Complex
7. "Speed"
  - Performed by Little Brother
8. "Ebonics"
  - Performed by Big L
9. "Play Dis [Clean]"
  - Performed by Saukrates
10. "Players"
  - Performed by Slum Village
11. "Runnin'"
  - Performed by Pharcyde
12. "Fuck The Police"
  - Performed by Jay Dee
13. "Eric B. Is President"
  - Performed by Eric B. & Rakim
14. "Droppin' Science"
  - Performed by Marley Marl
15. "The ? Remains"
  - Performed by Gang Starr
16. "Mass Appeal"
  - Performed by Gang Starr
17. "Full Clip"
  - Performed by Gang Starr
18. "Boom"
  - Performed by Royce Da 5'9"
19. "Award Tour"
  - Performed by A Tribe Called Quest
20. "Don't Nobody Care About Us"
  - Performed by Phat Kat
21. "Quiet Storm"
  - Performed by Mobb Deep
22. "Who Got Da Props?"
  - Performed by Black Moon
23. "Let's Get Dirty (I Can't Get In Da Club)"
  - Performed by Redman
  - Featuring DJ Kool
24. "Choice Is Yours"
  - Performed by Black Sheep
25. "Lookin' At The Front Door"
  - Performed by Main Source
26. "Them That Not"
  - Performed by J-Live

=== Disc two: Unmixed Disc ===
1. "Boom"
  - Performed by Royce Da 5'9"
  - Produced by DJ Premier
2. "The Best Part"
  - Performed by J-Live
  - Produced by DJ Premier
3. "Them That's Not"
  - Performed by J-Live
  - Produced by J-Live, Grap Luva
4. "Don't Nobody Care About Us"
  - Performed by Phat Kat
  - Produced by Jay Dee
5. "Who Got The Props"
  - Performed by Black Moon
  - Produced by Da Beatminerz
6. "Looking At The Front Door"
  - Performed by Main Source
  - Produced by Main Source
7. "Top 10 List"
  - Performed by Masta Ace
  - Produced by Saukrates
8. "Tear Shit Up"
  - Performed by Biz Markie
  - Produced by M. Hall
9. "Visualize"
  - Performed by Mr. Complex
  - Produced by DJ Spinna
10. "Quiet Storm"
  - Performed by Mobb Deep
  - Produced by Havoc
11. "Eric B Is President"
  - Performed by Eric B & Rakim
  - Produced by Eric B & Rakim
12. "Choice Is Yours"
  - Performed by Black Sheep
  - Produced by Black Sheep
13. "Let's Get Dirty"
  - Performed by Redman
  - Produced by Rockwilder
14. "Ebonics"
  - Performed by Big L
  - Produced by Ron Browz
15. "Mass Appeal"
  - Performed by Gang Starr
  - Produced by DJ Premier
16. "The ? Remains"
  - Performed by Gang Starr
  - Produced by DJ Premier
17. "Players"
  - Performed by Slum Village
  - Produced by Jay Dee
18. "Too Complex"
  - Performed by L Da Head Toucha
  - Produced by Vinyl Reanimators
19. "Treat 'Em Right"
  - Performed by Chubb Rock
  - Produced by Howie Tee
