= A Nightmare on My Street =

Single by DJ Jazzy Jeff & the Fresh Prince

from the album He's the DJ, I'm the Rapper
- Released: August 1, 1988
- Recorded: 1987
- Genre: Comedy rap, horrorcore, pop rap
- Length: 6:09 (LP/cassette copies of album); 4:53 (45 length/CD copies of album)
- Label: Jive; RCA
- Songwriters: Will Smith, Jeffrey Townes, Pete Harris
- Producers: Smith, Townes, Bryan "Chuck" New, Harris

DJ Jazzy Jeff & the Fresh Prince singles chronology
"Parents Just Don't Understand" (1988)	"A Nightmare on My Street" (1988)	"I Think I Can Beat Mike Tyson" (1989)

Music video
- "A Nightmare on My Street" on YouTube

"A Nightmare on My Street" is the third single from DJ Jazzy Jeff & the Fresh Prince's second studio album, He's the DJ, I'm the Rapper. The song became a crossover hit in the US, reaching #15 on the Hot 100. The song was released as a single in early 1988 on vinyl and cassette tape. The song humorously describes an encounter with the horror film villain Freddy Krueger and was considered for inclusion in the movie A Nightmare on Elm Street 4: The Dream Master, but the producers of the film decided against it.

New Line Cinema, copyright holders of the A Nightmare on Elm Street film franchise, sued DJ Jazzy Jeff & the Fresh Prince's record label for copyright infringement, forcing the label to destroy a music video produced for the song (though a copy of the video did survive and is available online). Both sides eventually settled out of court, but as a result, vinyl pressings of the album He's the DJ, I'm the Rapper contain a disclaimer sticker that says, "[This song] is not part of the soundtrack...and is not authorized, licensed, or affiliated with the Nightmare on Elm Street films." The song samples Charles Bernstein's musical motif from A Nightmare on Elm Street.

== Content ==
The Fresh Prince opens the song by introducing "Fred" (Freddy Krueger), then recounts his encounter with him. One Saturday evening, Prince, DJ Jazzy Jeff, and Ready Rock C get together with their dates to see A Nightmare on Elm Street at a movie theater. Later that night, Prince wakes from a sound sleep, hot and thirsty. He goes downstairs for a drink and notices that his television is on. When he turns it off, he hears Fred's voice behind him, angry that he cut off Late Night with David Letterman. Prince flees the house, but then concludes that he must be dreaming. As he returns home, Fred speaks to him again, this time offering a partnership in which he will possess Prince's body and claim his friends' souls. As Prince declines, Fred slashes his shirt. Prince, feeling the pain and fearful for his life, runs up to bed and hides under his sheets. Fred jumps onto the bed and starts slashing. Prince prays for mercy and suddenly wakes up alone when his morning alarm sounds. He scoffs at what he assumes was a nightmare, but when he sees rips on his sheets, he realizes that what happened was real. He quickly calls Jeff on the phone, warning him to stay awake. Jeff nonchalantly refuses, and is then heard screaming as Fred attacks and apparently slays him, laughing evilly and declaring himself Prince's new DJ.

The spoken-word opening to the music video shows Jeff having survived, albeit in a hospital when his friends arrive to check on him. Jeff wakes from his unconscious state and murmurs the word "Fred" in fear before Prince's lyrics begin.

== Versions ==
The original track as included on the original LP and cassette pressings of the album He's the DJ, I'm the Rapper ran 6:09. However, the entire album could not fit onto compact discs of the time, so for the CD release, many tracks were shortened; the single version "A Nightmare on My Street" was used in place of the original. This version is not simply an edit of the original album cut, as it included different lyrics in certain sections. The version included on DJ Jazzy Jeff & the Fresh Prince's 1998 Greatest Hits album is not the original single version. Although it is labeled "Single Edit" and runs the same length, it is simply an edited version of the original recording and does not include the different lyrics recorded for the single.

== Track listing ==
7" Vinyl

1. "A Nightmare on My Street" - 4:53
2. "A Nightmare on My Street" (Instrumental) - 5:14

12" Vinyl

1. "A Nightmare on My Street" - 4:53
2. "A Nightmare on My Street" (Instrumental) - 5:14

12" Promotional Vinyl

1. "A Nightmare on My Street" (Original Version) - 6:09
2. "A Nightmare on My Street" (Single Version) - 4:53
3. "A Nightmare on My Street" (Instrumental) - 6:08

== Official versions ==
- Original Version - 6:09 (Found on the 12" Vinyl)
- Instrumental - 6:08 (Found on the 7" Vinyl)
- Single Version - 4:16 (Found on the 12" Promotional Vinyl)

== Charts ==
Chart (1988)	Peak position
Canada Top Singles (RPM)	61
U.S. Billboard Hot 100	15
U.S. Billboard Hot Black Singles	9
