= Rock the House (album) =

Studio album by DJ Jazzy Jeff & the Fresh Prince
- Released: April 7, 1987
- Recorded: 1986
- Genre: Pop-rap
- Length: 44:36
- Label: Jive; RCA
- Producer: Dana Goodman; Lawrence Goodman (co.)

DJ Jazzy Jeff & the Fresh Prince chronology
Rock the House (1987)	He's the DJ, I'm the Rapper (1988)

Singles from Rock the House
- 1. "Girls Ain't Nothing but Trouble" Released: 1986; 2. "Just One of Those Days" Released: 1987; 3. "The Magnificent Jazzy Jeff" Released: 1987; 4. "A Touch of Jazz" Released: 1987; 5. "Don't Even Try It" Released: 1988

Rock the House is the debut album from the hip-hop duo DJ Jazzy Jeff & the Fresh Prince. The album was released on April 7, 1987, in Europe and the United States, and was subsequently re-issued in 1988 in Europe. Three tracks from the album were released as singles: "The Magnificent Jazzy Jeff", "A Touch of Jazz" and "Girls Ain't Nothing but Trouble". When the album was released on CD in 1988, the rerecorded version of "Girls Ain't Nothing but Trouble", which was released as a single after He's the DJ, I'm the Rapper ran its course, replaced the original 1986 recording. The art work for the album cover was done by a Philadelphia artist, Charles Gossett.

== Critical reception ==
Professional ratings
Review scores
Source	Rating
AllMusic	4/5 stars
The Rolling Stone Album Guide	2/5 stars

Trouser Press said, "Amid routine boasts and human beat box exhibitions, Rock the House introduces the 17-year-old Smith's friendly singsong delivery and engagingly hapless persona on the PG-rated story, 'Just One of Those Days'".

== Track listing ==
Side one
No.	Title	Writer(s)	Length
1.	"Girls Ain't Nothing but Trouble"	Will Smith, Jeffrey Townes	5:07
2.	"Just One of Those Days"	W. Smith, J. Townes	5:43
3.	"Rock the House" (Live, NY Union Square)	W. Smith, Clarence Holmes	4:21
4.	"Taking It to the Top"	W. Smith, J. Townes	5:21
5.	"The Magnificent Jazzy Jeff"	W. Smith, J. Townes	5:25

Side two
No.	Title	Writer(s)	Length
6.	"Just Rockin'"	W. Smith, J. Townes	5:03
7.	"Guys Ain't Nothing but Trouble" (featuring Ice Cream Tee)	W. Smith, J. Townes, Bettina Clark	4:30
8.	"A Touch of Jazz"	Dana Goodman, Lawrence Goodman	3:16
9.	"Don't Even Try It"	W. Smith, J. Townes	5:24
10.	"Special Announcement"	W. Smith, J. Townes, C. Holmes, D. Goodman	1:46
Total length:			44:36

== Samples ==
Sample credits

"Girls Ain't Nothing but Trouble"

- Theme from I Dream of Jeannie (1985 recording for Television's Greatest Hits: 65 TV Themes! From the 50's and 60's)
- "Catch the Beat" by T-Ski Valley

"Just One of Those Days"

- "Puttin' on the Ritz" by Taco
- "Change the Beat (Female Version)" by Beside

"Rock the House"

- "Ben" by Michael Jackson
- Theme from Sanford and Son
- "Theme from Mahogany (Do You Know Where You're Going To)" by Diana Ross
- "The Big Beat" by Billy Squier

"Takin' It to the Top"

- "Cold Sweat" by James Brown
- "Kool Is Back" by Funk, Inc.

"The Magnificent Jazzy Jeff"

- "Good Times" by Chic
- "Change the Beat (Female Version)" by Beside
- "Def Jam" by Jazzy Jay
- "Get Fly" by T.J. Swann & Company
- "Kool Is Back" by Funk, Inc.
- "Dance to the Drummer's Beat" by Herman Kelly and Life
- "Here We Go" by Run-DMC
- "Punk Rock Rap" by the Cold Crush Brothers
- "Roxanne's Revenge" by Roxanne Shante
- State of the Union speech by Ronald Reagan
- "Girls Ain't Nothing but Trouble" by DJ Jazzy Jeff & the Fresh Prince
- "Death Mix (Part II)" by Afrika Bambaataa
- "The Saga of Roxanne ('It's Fresh')" by Korner Boyz
- "19" by Paul Hardcastle
- "(Nothing Serious) Just Buggin'" by Whistle
- "Funky Drummer" by James Brown
- "The Big Beat" by Billy Squier
- "Shout" by Tears for Fears

"Just Rockin'"

- "Reading the Comics - July, 1945" by Fiorello La Guardia
- "Change the Beat" (Female Version) by Beside
- "Rocket in the Pocket (Live)" by Cerrone

"Guys Ain't Nothing but Trouble"

- Theme from I Dream of Jeannie

"A Touch of Jazz"

- "Westchester Lady" by Bob James
- "'T' Plays It Cool" by Marvin Gaye
- "Harlem River Drive" by Bobbi Humphrey
- "Mr. Magic" by Grover Washington Jr.
- "Change (Makes You Want to Hustle)" by Donald Byrd

== Charts ==
=== Weekly charts ===
Chart (1987)	Peak position
UK Albums Chart	97
US Billboard 200	83
US Top R&B/Hip-Hop Albums (Billboard)	24

== Certifications ==
Region	Certification	Certified units/sales
United States (RIAA)	Gold	500,000^{^}
^{^} Shipments figures based on certification alone.
