= Ring My Bell (DJ Jazzy Jeff & the Fresh Prince song) =

Single by DJ Jazzy Jeff & the Fresh Prince

from the album Homebase
- Released: September 13, 1991
- Recorded: 1991
- Genre: Hip-hop; new jack swing; R&B
- Length: 4:44
- Label: Jive; RCA
- Songwriters: Fredrick Knight; Will Smith; Jeffery Townes

DJ Jazzy Jeff & the Fresh Prince singles chronology
"Summertime" (1991)	"Ring My Bell" (1991)	"The Things That U Do" (1992)

"Ring My Bell" is a song by American hip-hop duo DJ Jazzy Jeff & the Fresh Prince, released in September 1991 by Jive and RCA Records as the second single from their fourth studio album, Homebase (1991). The song samples and shares the same name as Anita Ward's 1979 single, "Ring My Bell", though the original lyrics were replaced by those written by Will Smith. Nevertheless, the song's original writer, Fredrick Knight was sole writer who received writing credits. The song appears on Smith's series, The Fresh Prince of Bel-Air in the closing credits from "The Mother of All Battles" off the season 2 episode.

"Ring My Bell" was the follow-up to the duo's smash hit, "Summertime", which peaked at No. 4 on the US Billboard Hot 100. Though not as successful as "Summertime", "Ring My Bell" also became a top-40 hit, peaking at No. 20 on the Hot 100 and receiving a gold certification from the RIAA on November 26, 1991, for sales of 500,000 copies.

== Critical reception ==
Stephen Dalton from NME referred to "Ring My Bell" as a "chatalong disco cover" and named it as one of the best songs on Homebase (alongside previous single "Summertime") in an otherwise negative review of the album.

== Single track listing ==
=== A-Side ===
1. "Ring My Bell" (Mr. Lee's 12" Mix) – 5:27
2. "Ring My Bell" (Hula And Fingers Club Mix) – 5:56
3. "Ring My Bell" (DJ Jazzy Jeff's Street Mix) – 5:00

=== B-Side ===
1. "Ring My Bell" (Instravibe) – 5:56
2. "Ring My Bell" (DJ Jazzy Jeff's Street Instrumental) – 5:00

== Charts ==
Chart (1991–1992)	Peak position
Australia (ARIA)	58
Europe (European Dance Radio)	5
New Zealand (Recorded Music NZ)	11
Switzerland (Schweizer Hitparade)	29
UK Singles (OCC)	53
UK Dance (Music Week)	15
UK Club Chart (Record Mirror)	15
US Billboard Hot 100	20
US Hot R&B Singles (Billboard)	22
US Cash Box Top 100	55

== Certifications ==
Region	Certification	Certified units/sales
United States (RIAA)	Gold	500,000^{^}
^{^} Shipments figures based on certification alone.
