= Girl Trouble (book) =

2013 book by Carol Dyhouse

Girl Trouble: Panic and Progress in the History of Young Women
- First edition
- Author: Carol Dyhouse
- Language: English
- Subject: Young women
- Published: Zed Books (2013)
- Publication place: United Kingdom
- Pages: 255 pp.
- ISBN: 978-1-7836-0160-8

Girl Trouble: Panic and Progress in the History of Young Women is a book about the media hysteria that accompanied the behavior of young women in the 20th century, written by Carol Dyhouse and published by Zed Books on 14 March 2013. Upon publication the book was positively reviewed by critics.

== Summary ==
The book is divided into 8 chapters entitled 'White slavery and the seduction of innocents', 'Unwomanly types New Women, revolting daughters and rebel girls', 'Brazen flappers, bright young things and 'Miss Modern', 'Good-time girls, baby dolls and teenage brides', 'Coming of age in the 1960s: beat girls and dolly birds', 'Taking liberties: panic over permissiveness and women's liberation', 'Body anxieties, depressives, ladettes and living dolls: what happened to girl power?' and 'Looking back'. The book is prefaced by an introduction.

== Reception ==
In The Guardian, Tessa Hadley detailed some anecdotes from the book and said that 'Part of the usefulness of sociology is separating the hard facts from the moral panic, and Dyhouse gives a sane account of the realities behind the scares.' Hadley contrasted the chapters focussing on the early 20th century with her own lived experience saying that 'As the story gets closer to home, the material seems more opaque and resistant to incisive analysis. Because some of us were there – Jackie magazine; the Brook Advisory Centres; the feminist book, Our Bodies, Ourselves; and Spare Rib magazine – we feel how complicated it all was, and how, in spite of progress, historical time as we experience it individually doesn't feel very often like a clean line leading onwards and upwards. Or, indeed, leading anywhere at all.'
