= Pleasure (Oregon band) =

Band

- Origin: Portland, Oregon, United States
- Genres: R&B, funk, soul, jazz
- Years active: 1972–1982; 2019–present
- Labels: Fantasy Records, RCA Records
- Members: Michael Hepburn; Nathaniel Phillips; Dennis Springer; Doug Lewis; Brian Foxworth; Tiffany Wilson
- Past members: Bruce Carter; Sherman Davis; Brooke Shields; Dan Brewster; Marlon McClain; Bruce Smith; Tony Collins

Pleasure is an American band from Portland, Oregon, United States. Blending soul, funk and jazz with a street edge, it became a cult group on the underground Black-music scene of the late 1970s. Their song "Glide", from the album Future Now, went to #55 on the Billboard Hot 100 and #10 on the Best Selling Soul Singles chart in 1979; it was the band’s biggest hit. The band broke up in 1982.

A new version of the band re-formed in 2019 and released an album titled Now Is the Time.

== History ==
Pleasure was formed in Portland, Oregon, in 1972 as a merger of two local bands: the Franchise, which included drummer Bruce Carter (December 28, 1956 – August 12, 2006), bassist Nathaniel Phillips, and guitarist Marlon McClain; and the Soul Masters, including keyboardist Michael and Donald Hepburn, Saxophonist Dennis Springer, trombonist/guitarist Dan Brewster, vocalist Sherman Davis, and percussionist Bruce Smith. Trumpet player Tony Collins and lead vocalist/guitarist Randy Hall. have been part of the group along the way.

In 1974, Grover Washington, who was a big fan of the band, directed it to seek out the Crusaders' Wayne Henderson. Impressed with what he heard, his enthusiasm led them to a deal with Fantasy Records. This was the beginning of a six-year relationship with the label and a four-year relationship with Wayne Henderson, who, through his own production company At Home Productions, was the band's producer and mentor.

In 1979, the band released the album Future Now, which included the hit "Glide"; it went to #55 on the Billboard Hot 100 and #10 on the Billboard R&B chart.

Pleasure managed to fuse many styles of music including jazz, funk, soul, and rock along the way and achieved national recognition and excellent record sales, along with catching the ear of many hip-hop artists who were inspired to sample much of Pleasure’s material.

This success was visibly evidenced with the now well-established African-American classic cult film House Party, featuring Kid and Play, and recently the comedy film Uncle Drew. Bruce Carter’s drum solo on "Bouncy Lady" along with songs "Let’s Dance" and "Joyous" were used in the Ultimate Breaks and Beats Series.

"Joyous" was also used on Janet Jackson's 1997 release, The Velvet Rope (“Free Xone”), and "Future Now" was used in Will Smith’s 2002 release Born to Reign ("1000 Kisses"). "Celebrate The Good Things", "Thoughts Of Old Flames," and others are still being sampled and used today.

After its breakup in 1982 most members managed to stay active in the music scene one way or another through teaching, producing other acts, songwriting for Disney, and touring with artists such as Kenny G, Herb Alpert, The Crusaders, The Whispers, United We Funk All Stars, the Dazz Band, and Cool’R.

Michael Hepburn (owner of the name and co-founder) is still performing and producing,and is presently working as a Civil Deputy Prosecuting Attorney in the King County Office of the Prosecuting Attorney.

Pleasure now is composed of Michael Hepburn, Nathaniel Phillips, Douglas Lewis, Dennis Springer, Brian Foxworth, and Tiffany Wilson and released an album on Pleasure Records in 2019 called Now Is The Time. The band also released “One More Time” from the current album as the A-side of a 45-rpm vinyl record by Neil Pounds on his UK label Six Nine Records Ltd. The B-side of its 45 is “For Your Pleasure,” which is the introductory selection on the album.

== Discography ==
=== Studio albums ===
Year	Album	Chart positions		Record label
Year	Album	US	US R&B	Record label
1975	Dust Yourself Off	—	54	Fantasy Records
1976	Accept No Substitutes	162	32	Fantasy Records
1977	Joyous	113	34	Fantasy Records
1978	Get to the Feeling	119	42	Fantasy Records
1979	Future Now	67	27	Fantasy Records
1980	Special Things	97	27	Fantasy Records
1982	Give It Up	164	30	RCA
2018	Now Is The Time	164	30	—

=== Singles ===
Year	Single	Chart positions		
Year	Single	US	US R&B	US Dance
1976	"Ghettos of the Mind"	—	71	—
1977	"Joyous"	—	35	—
1979	"Future Now"	—	75	—
1980	"Glide"	55	10	—
1980	"Real Thing"	—	65	—
1980	"Yearnin' Burnin'"	—	30	—
