= Girls Ain't Nothing but Trouble =

Single by DJ Jazzy Jeff & the Fresh Prince

Single by DJ Jazzy Jeff & the Fresh Prince

from the album Rock the House
- B-side: "Guys Ain't Nothing but Trouble"
- Released: November 9, 1986
- Genre: Pop rap
- Length: 5:12
- Label: Word-Up
- Songwriter(s): Will Smith, Jeff Townes

DJ Jazzy Jeff & the Fresh Prince singles chronology
| "Girls Ain't Nothing but Trouble" (1986) | "The Magnificent Jazzy Jeff" (1986) |

"Girls Ain't Nothing but Trouble" is the debut single by DJ Jazzy Jeff and the Fresh Prince, from their 1987 debut album Rock the House released on Philadelphia-based Word Records (Later changed to Word-Up Records). It was released in 1986. The music is built around a sample from the theme tune of the 1960s television series I Dream of Jeannie. It was featured in the eighth episode of The Fresh Prince of Bel-Air where Will and Carlton were battling over a girl. In the song, Will Smith warns his crew to stay away from young women and recounts some unfortunate (but humorous) experiences with them. In the end of the 1988 version, DJ Jazzy Jeff references two of the duo's further singles, "Parents Just Don't Understand" and "Nightmare on My Street." The song was only released on vinyl. The music video was released in 1986.

On April 21, 2016, after the death of Prince, MTV accidentally aired this music video during a Prince marathon.

== Content ==
The Fresh Prince describes several events wherein he encounters females and his misfortunes with them. The first verse details the time when he meets a "lovely lady" who introduces herself as "Exotic Elaine." They go into a restaurant, where Elaine asks the Prince if he has a lust for her. His replay is, "Well, kinda..." after which she goes into a wild, lustful rage on him. He pushes her aside, she yells out, "Rape!" which scares him into running down alleyways until he gets caught by police, and he gets "arrested [and] charged with aggravated assault."

The next verse features the Prince in a bar "one Friday night...maxin' and relaxin'" where he is drinking tequila. He meets a girl named Sheila. She takes him to her house, and he gets ready to "make [his] move" when the door suddenly opens. Sheila's boyfriend sees the Prince lying in bed with her, and proceeds to threaten him with violence. The Prince simply jumps out the window, and has to walk back home in a snowstorm.

The 1988 version adds an extra verse where the Prince calls his girlfriend Betty and tells her he got tickets to the latest Run-DMC concert. He goes up to her house, and Betty's mother answers the door to tell him she's not ready yet. So, he waits for her to be ready, then she opens the door to tell him that she still needs to finish her hair. Eventually, Betty has kept the Prince waiting so long, that by the time Betty is finally ready they missed the show, so he leaves her and drives home. Regardless, the Prince talks with Jazzy Jeff about it and they agree that you "can't live with 'em, can't live without 'em."

== Track listing ==
7" Vinyl

1. "Girls Ain't Nothing but Trouble" – 5:12
2. "Guys Ain't Nothing but Trouble" – 4:34

12" Vinyl #1

1. "Girls Ain't Nothing but Trouble" (Laidley & Oakenfold Remix) – 7:30
2. "Guys Ain't Nothing but Trouble" – 4:34

12" Vinyl #2

1. "Girls Ain't Nothing but Trouble" (1988 Extended Remix) – 4:44
2. "Girls Ain't Nothing but Trouble" (Instrumental) – 4:44
3. "Brand New Funk" (Extended Version) – 4:48
4. "Brand New Funk" (Live Version) – 4:36

American 12" Vinyl

1. "Girls Ain't Nothing but Trouble" (1988 Extended Remix) – 4:44
2. "Girls Ain't Nothing but Trouble" (Live Version At Nassau Col) – 5:28
3. "Girls Ain't Nothing but Trouble" (1988 Single Version) – 4:21
4. "Girls Ain't Nothing but Trouble" (Instrumental) – 4:44

Promotional 12" Vinyl

1. "Girls Ain't Nothing but Trouble" (Original Radio Version) – 5:12
2. "Girls Ain't Nothing but Trouble" (Original Instrumental) – 5:12
3. "Girls Ain't Nothing but Trouble" (Def Def Mix) – 5:02
4. "Girls Ain't Nothing but Trouble" (Def Def Bonus Beats) – 3:00

== Charts ==
| Chart (1986) | Peak position |
|---|---|
| UK Singles (Official Charts Company) | 21 |
| U.S. Billboard Hot 100 | 57 |
| U.S. Billboard Hot R&B/Hip-Hop Songs | 81 |
| Chart (1989) | Peak position |
| Australia (ARIA) | 142 |
