= Homebase (album) =

Studio album by DJ Jazzy Jeff & the Fresh Prince
- Released: July 23, 1991
- Recorded: May 1990–April 1991
- Studios: Battery Studios; Soundtrack Studios (New York City, New York); Warehouse/J.E.M Recording Studios (Philadelphia, Pennsylvania)
- Genres: Hip-hop; new jack swing
- Length: 53:04
- Label: Jive
- Producers: DJ Jazzy Jeff; Hula & K. Fingers; Will Smith

DJ Jazzy Jeff & the Fresh Prince chronology
And in This Corner... (1989)	Homebase (1991)	Code Red (1993)

Singles from Homebase
- 1. "Summertime" Released: May 20, 1991; 2. "Ring My Bell" Released: September 13, 1991; 3. "The Things That U Do" Released: January 20, 1992; 4. "You Saw My Blinker" Released: 1992

Professional ratings
Review scores
Source	Rating
AllMusic	4.5/5 stars
Calgary Herald	B
Entertainment Weekly	B−
Los Angeles Times	(favorable)
NME	4/10
Q	4/5 stars
Rolling Stone	3/5 stars

Homebase is the fourth studio album released by hip-hop duo DJ Jazzy Jeff & the Fresh Prince. The album was released on July 23, 1991, reaching number 12 on the Billboard 200 charts and number 5 on the Top R&B/Hip-Hop Albums chart. It received generally favorable reviews from critics. The album was certified Platinum and won an American Music Award for Favorite Rap/Hip-Hop Album in 1992.

== Album information ==
Four singles were released from the album: "Summertime", "The Things That U Do", "Ring My Bell", and "You Saw My Blinker". The second track on and lead single from the album, "Summertime", earned the duo a second Grammy Award for Best Single in early 1992. Smith admitted that he tried to make his voice sound deeper than usual for this album, as many fans enjoyed the track "Then She Bit Me" from the duo's previous album, And in This Corner..., which was sung in this style, while "You Saw My Blinker" is one of only two instances in which Smith uses obscenities in his music. The single "Ring My Bell" reached number 20 on the Billboard Hot 100 and number 22 on the Hot R&B/Hip Hop Singles chart.

== Track listing ==
No.	Title	Writer(s)	Length
1.	"I'm All That"	W. Smith; Townes; Rick James	3:43
2.	"Summertime"	W. Smith; Townes; Robert Bell; Ronald Bell; George Brown; Robert Mickens; Lamar Hula Mahone; Craig Simpkins; Charles Smith; Alton Taylor; Dennis Thomas; Richard Westfield	4:30
3.	"The Things That U Do"	W. Smith; Townes; Craig King	4:56
4.	"This Boy Is Smooth"	W. Smith; Townes	4:58
5.	"Ring My Bell"	W. Smith; Townes; Frederick Knight	4:44
6.	"A Dog Is a Dog"	W. Smith; Townes	4:29
7.	"Caught in the Middle (Love & Life)"	W. Smith; Townes; King	4:21
8.	"Trapped on the Dance Floor"	W. Smith; Townes	5:19
9.	"Who Stole the D.J."	W. Smith; Townes	4:50
10.	"You Saw My Blinker"	W. Smith; Townes	4:14
11.	"Dumb Dancin'"	W. Smith; Townes	4:55
12.	"Summertime (Reprise)"	W. Smith; Townes; Robert Bell; Ronald Bell; Brown; Mickens; Mahone; Simpkins; C. Smith; Taylor; Thomas; Westfield	2:05
Total length:			53:04

== Charts ==
=== Weekly charts ===
Weekly chart performance for Homebase
Chart (1991)	Peak position
Australian Albums (ARIA)	110
Canada Top Albums/CDs (RPM)	33
New Zealand Albums (RMNZ)	43
UK Albums (Official Charts)	69
US Billboard 200	12
US Top R&B/Hip-Hop Albums (Billboard)	5

=== Year-end charts ===
Year-end chart performance for Homebase
Chart (1991)	Position
US Billboard 200	73
US Top R&B/Hip-Hop Albums (Billboard)	53

=== Singles ===
Chart performance of singles from Homebase
Title	Year	Chart positions	
Title	Year	US Pop	US R&B
"Summertime"	1991	4	1
"Ring My Bell"	1991	20	22
"The Things That U Do"	1992	—	43

== Certifications ==
Certifications for Homebase
Region	Certification	Certified units/sales
Canada (Music Canada)	Gold	50,000^{^}
United States (RIAA)	Platinum	1,000,000^{^}
^{^} Shipments figures based on certification alone.
