= Code Red (DJ Jazzy Jeff & the Fresh Prince album) =

Studio album by DJ Jazzy Jeff & the Fresh Prince
- Released: October 12, 1993
- Recorded: 1992–1993
- Genres: Hip-hop; East Coast hip-hop
- Length: 54:00
- Label: Jive
- Producers: Pete Rock; DJ Jazzy Jeff; the Fresh Prince; Hula; K Fingers; Teddy Riley; Markell Riley; Mr. Lee; Xavier Hargrove; Victor Emanuel Cooke; Dallas Austin

DJ Jazzy Jeff & the Fresh Prince chronology
Homebase (1991)	Code Red (1993)	Greatest Hits (1998)

Singles from Code Red
- 1. "Boom! Shake the Room" Released: July 20, 1993; 2. "I'm Looking for the One (To Be with Me)" Released: November 8, 1993; 3. "Can't Wait to Be with You" Released: February 13, 1994; 4. "Twinkle Twinkle (I'm Not a Star)" Released: June 26, 1994; 5. "I Wanna Rock" Released: July 23, 1994

Professional ratings
Review scores
Source	Rating
AllMusic	3/5 stars
Entertainment Weekly	B
Los Angeles Times	3/4 stars
Music Week	4/5 stars
NME	6/10
The Philadelphia Inquirer	3/4 stars
Q	3/5 stars
Select	1/5 medals
Smash Hits	5/5 stars

Code Red is the fifth and final studio album by the American hip-hop duo DJ Jazzy Jeff & the Fresh Prince, released on October 12, 1993, on Jive Records. The album peaked at number sixty-four on the Billboard 200 and number thirty-nine on the Top R&B/Hip-Hop Albums chart. On January 14, 1994, the Recording Industry Association of America certified the album gold. Four singles reached the Billboard charts; "Boom! Shake the Room", "I'm Looking for the One (To Be with Me)", "I Wanna Rock", and "Can't Wait to Be with You".

== Track listing ==
No.	Title	Writer(s)	Producer(s)	Length
1.	"Somethin' Like Dis"	Will Smith; Peter Phillips	Pete Rock	4:08
2.	"I'm Looking for the One (To Be with Me)"	W. Smith; Menton Smith; Teddy Riley	Teddy Riley; Markell Riley	4:35
3.	"Boom! Shake the Room"	W. Smith; Lee Haggard; Wayne Williams; Keith Mayberry; Gregory Webster; Marvin Pierce; Norman Napier; Walter Morrison; Ralph Middlebrooks; Marshall Jones; Leroy Bonner; Andrew Noland	Mr. Lee	3:49
4.	"Can't Wait to Be with You" (featuring Christopher Williams)	W. Smith; Luther Vandross	Will Smith	3:51
5.	"Twinkle Twinkle (I'm Not a Star)"	W. Smith; Jeffrey Townes	Jeff Townes	5:23
6.	"Code Red"	W. Smith; Phillips	Pete Rock	3:30
7.	"Shadow Dreams"	W. Smith; Lamar Mahone; Craig Simpkins	Hula; K. Fingers	4:05
8.	"Just Kickin' It"	W. Smith; Mahone; Simpkins	Hula; K. Fingers	4:11
9.	"Ain't No Place Like Home"	W. Smith; Xavier Hargrove	Xavier Hargrove	5:08
10.	"I Wanna Rock"	W. Smith; Townes; Rick James	Jeff Townes	6:19
11.	"Scream"	W. Smith; Dallas Austin; Kevin Wales	Dallas Austin	4:31
12.	"Boom! Shake the Room" (Street Remix)	W. Smith; Haggard; W. Williams; Mayberry	Mr. Lee; DJ Jazz (r.); Victor Emanuel Cooke (r.); Jazzy Jeff (r.)	4:30

== Samples ==
Ain't No Place Like Home

- "Melody for Thelma" by Blue Mitchell
- "La Di Da Di" by Doug E. Fresh and Slick Rick

Boom! Shake the Room

- "Funky Worm" by Ohio Players
- "The Jones' (12-inch Surgery Mix)" by the Temptations
- "Jump" by Kris Kross

Can't Wait to Be with You

- "You'll Like It Too" by Funkadelic
- "Never Too Much" by Luther Vandross

Code Red

- "Atomic Dog" by George Clinton
- "Date with the Rain" by Eddie Kendricks

I'm Looking for the One (To Be with Me)

- "Funky President" by James Brown
- "Tell Me if You Still Care" by the S.O.S. Band

I Wanna Rock

- "All Night Long" by Mary Jane Girls
- "I Can't Live Without My Radio" by LL Cool J
- "It Takes Two" by Rob Base & DJ E-Z Rock
- "Think About It" by Lynn Collins

Just Kickin' It

- "Mystic Voyage" by Roy Ayers Ubiquity

Scream

- "School Boy Crush" by Average White Band
- "That's the Way (I Like It)" by KC & the Sunshine Band
- "Jump" by Kris Kross

Somethin' Like Dis

- "Rock Box" by Run-DMC
- "La Di Da Di" by Doug E. Fresh and Slick Rick

Twinkle Twinkle (I'm Not a Star)

- "It's a New Day" by Skull Snaps
- "I Wanna Thank You" by Johnny Guitar Watson
- "Black Steel in the Hour of Chaos" by Public Enemy

Boom! Shake the Room (Street Remix)

- "Superfluous" by Eddie Harris
- "Mama Said Knock You Out" by LL Cool J
- "Come In Out of the Rain" by Parliament
- "Wah Wah Man" by Young-Holt Unlimited
- "Long Red" by Mountain

== Charts ==
Weekly chart performance for Code Red
Chart (1993–1994)	Peak
Australian Albums (ARIA)	25
Canada Top Albums/CDs (RPM)	68
Dutch Albums (Album Top 100)	54
European Albums (European Top 100 Albums)	50
German Albums (Offizielle Top 100)	61
Swiss Albums (Schweizer Hitparade)	35
UK Albums (Official Charts)	50
US Billboard 200	64
US Top R&B/Hip-Hop Albums (Billboard)	39

== Certifications ==
Certifications for Code Red
Region	Certification	Certified units/sales
Spain (Promusicae)	Gold	50,000^{^}
United States (RIAA)	Gold	500,000^{^}
^{^} Shipments figures based on certification alone.
