= Ready Rock C =

American rapper

- Born: Philadelphia, Pennsylvania, U.S.
- Genres: Hip hop
- Occupations: Record producer, beatboxer, rapper

Clarence Holmes, better known as Ready Rock C, is an American hip hop record producer, beatboxer, and rapper. He is best known for his early career with Will Smith and DJ Jazzy Jeff (Jeffrey Townes), then known as DJ Jazzy Jeff & The Fresh Prince. According to Holmes, he left the group in 1990 because Smith "wanted the spotlight all to himself."

Holmes sued Smith and Townes in 1999, claiming he was owed one-third of the group's profits. The case was dismissed because the statute of limitations had expired.
