= Summertime (DJ Jazzy Jeff & the Fresh Prince song) =

1991 single by DJ Jazzy Jeff & the Fresh Prince

Single by DJ Jazzy Jeff & the Fresh Prince

from the album Homebase
- Released: May 17, 1991
- Genre: Hip-hop
- Length: 4:30 (album version); 3:57 (single edit)
- Label: Jive; RCA
- Songwriters: Will Smith; Jeffrey A. Townes; Robert Bell; Ronald Bell; George "Funky" Brown; Robert "Spike" Mickens; Lamar Hula Mahone; Craig Simpkins; Charles Smith; Alton Taylor; Dennis "D.T." Thomas; Richard Westfield
- Producers: K. Fingers (Craig Simpkins); Hula (Lamar Hula Mahone)

DJ Jazzy Jeff & the Fresh Prince singles chronology
| "Yo Home to Bel-Air" (1991) | "Summertime" (1991) | "Ring My Bell" (1991) |

Music video
- "Summertime" on YouTube

"Summertime" is a song by American hip-hop duo DJ Jazzy Jeff & the Fresh Prince, released in May 1991, by Jive and RCA Records, as the lead single from their fourth studio album, Homebase (1991). The song was produced by Chicago-based producers Hula and K. Fingers, and it won a Grammy Award for Best Rap Performance by a Duo or Group at the 1992 Grammy Awards. It spent a week at number one on the US Hot R&B Singles chart, as well as reaching number four on the Billboard Hot 100 (their highest charting single on the latter). It also became the duo's first single to enter the top 10 of the UK Singles Chart, peaking at number eight.

== Background and composition ==
After Will Smith completed recording for the tracks produced by Hula & Fingers in Chicago for the Homebase album and was headed back to Philadelphia, the producers handed Smith the tape that would become "Summertime". Due to a delay in his flight back home, Smith wrote the entire song in one sitting and decided to record it in Chicago. Due to his voice being worn out from a previous night out, he recorded his song in a lower tone than usual, unknowingly bringing out a style similar to rapper Rakim, whom Smith admired as one of his favorite rappers at the time. The song's instrumentation samples "Summer Madness" by Kool & the Gang, particularly the rising F♯ octaves played on an ARP 2600 synthesizer.

== Critical reception ==
Larry Flick from Billboard magazine wrote, "Pop/rap duo returns with this steamy hip-hop jam that is sure to quickly heat up radio airwaves thanks to its catchy chorus and clever wordplay." James Bernard from Entertainment Weekly described the song as "absolutely uplifting". Dennis Hunt from Los Angeles Times viewed it as a "strange cut", saying it's "just a laundry list of summer-is-fun cliches." Alan Jones from Music Week stated that "there is no denying this mellow rap classic captures the feel of summer." David Quantick from NME wrote that the duo "have created a song that is the epitome of pleasantness and, unlike The Fresh Prince of Bel Air, doesn't have any icky 'token children' in it." Another NME editor, Stephen Dalton, named it one of the best songs of the album, declaring it as "smoochy" and "a straight steal from Kool and the Gang". A reviewer from People magazine noted that "the musical backing is more sophisticated", viewing it as "a smooth Gershwin via Kool & the Gang version". Tony Cross from Smash Hits gave it a score of four out of five, writing, "A chorus that sweetly tells you it's time to sit back and unwind while the Prince raps attitude, is a perfect mix."

== Retrospective response ==
Steve Huey from AllMusic said that "Summertime" was "a warm, breezy reminiscence about growing up in Philadelphia and attending barbecues where the whole community showed up to see and be seen." He added, "It had all the good vibes of a typical Fresh Prince number, but it was clearly a more mature effort, and that's Homebase in a nutshell." In 2009, the song was ranked number 86 on Entertainment Weekly's "The 100 Greatest Summer Songs", saying, "Barbecues, girls, cars. Must be summer in Philly again." Rolling Stone magazine ranked it number nine in its 2013 "Best Summer Songs of All Time", writing, "Over a funky laid back beat, a young Will Smith does a fantastic Rakim impression over a sample of Kool & the Gang's "Summer Madness" and drops a sweet ode to hanging out and driving around his native Philly: "Honking at the honey in front of you with the light eyes/ She turn around to see what you beeping at/ It's like the summer's a natural aphrodisiac." It's still hip-hop's finest summer celebration."

== Track listing ==
- 12-inch vinyl (US)
1. "Summertime" (Single Edit) – 3:57
2. "Summertime" (Extended Club Mix) – 5:42
3. "Summertime" (D.J. Jazzy Jeff's Mix) – 5:37
4. "Summertime" (Extended Bass Mix) – 5:33
5. "Summertime" (Street Reclub Mix) – 6:03
6. "Summertime" (D.J. Jazzy Jeff's Instrumental) – 5:47
- 12-inch vinyl (UK)
1. "Summertime" (DJ Jazzy Jeff's Mix) – 5:37
2. "Summertime" (LP Version) – 4:30
3. "Summertime" (Instrumental) – 4:30
4. "Girls Ain't Nothing But Trouble" (Shorter Single Edit) – 3:58
- CD single
1. "Summertime" (Single Edit) – 3:57
2. "Summertime" (DJ Jazzy Jeff's Mix) – 5:37
3. "Summertime" (Street Club Remix) – 6:06
4. "Girls Ain't Nothing But Trouble" (Shorter Single Edit) – 3:58
- US CD single
1. "Summertime" (Single Edit) – 3:57
2. "Summertime" (LP Version) – 4:30
3. "Summertime" (DJ Jazzy Jeff's Mix) – 5:37
4. "Summertime" (Extended Club Mix) – 5:43
5. "Summertime" (Extended Bass Mix) – 5:36
6. "Summertime" (Street Club Remix) – 6:06
7. "Summertime" (DJ Jazzy Jeff's Instrumental) – 5:50
8. "Summertime" (Instrumental) – 4:30
- Summertime '98 CD single and 12-inch vinyl
1. "Summertime '98" (SoulPower Radio Mix) – 4:12
2. "Summertime '98" (SoulPower Hip Hop Mix) – 4:40
3. "Summertime '98" (SoulPower Instrumental) – 4:16
4. "Summertime" (Original Version) – 4:31
- Summertime (DJ Jazzy Jeff's 2007 Remixes)
1. "Summertime" (DJ Jazzy Jeff's Still Summertime Remix) (Radio Edit)
2. "Summertime" (DJ Jazzy Jeff's SoleFul Remix)
3. "Summertime" (DJ Jazzy Jeff's Still Summertime Remix)
4. "Summertime" (Original 1991 Album Version)

== Charts ==
=== Weekly charts ===
| Chart (1991) | Peak position |
|---|---|
| Australia (ARIA) | 52 |
| Canada Top Singles (RPM) | 29 |
| Canada Dance/Urban (RPM) | 6 |
| Europe (European Dance Radio) | 6 |
| Europe (European Hit Radio) | 13 |
| Germany (GfK) | 12 |
| Ireland (IRMA) | 14 |
| Luxembourg (Radio Luxembourg) | 13 |
| Netherlands (Dutch Top 40) | 20 |
| Netherlands (Single Top 100) | 12 |
| New Zealand (Recorded Music NZ) | 5 |
| Sweden (Sverigetopplistan) | 17 |
| Switzerland (Schweizer Hitparade) | 11 |
| UK Singles (Official Charts) | 8 |
| UK Airplay (Music Week) | 23 |
| UK Dance (Music Week) | 1 |
| UK Club Chart (Record Mirror) | 7 |
| US Billboard Hot 100 | 4 |
| US Hot R&B/Hip-Hop Songs (Billboard) | 1 |
| US Hot Rap Songs (Billboard) | 1 |
| US Cash Box Top 100 | 14 |

| Chart (1994) | Peak position |
|---|---|
| UK Singles (Official Charts) | 29 |
| UK Dance (Official Charts) | 13 |
| UK Dance (Music Week) | 13 |
| UK Club Chart (Music Week) | 69 |

| Chart (2013) | Peak position |
|---|---|
| UK Hip Hop/R&B (Official Charts) | 6 |

=== Year-end charts ===
| Chart (1991) | Position |
|---|---|
| Canada Dance/Urban (RPM) | 48 |
| Germany (Media Control) | 84 |
| New Zealand (RIANZ) | 33 |
| Sweden (Topplistan) | 94 |
| UK Singles (OCC) | 83 |
| UK Club Chart (Record Mirror) | 73 |
| US Billboard Hot 100 | 38 |

== Certifications ==
| Region | Certification | Certified units/sales |
|---|---|---|
| United Kingdom (BPI) | Platinum | 600,000^{‡} |
| United States (RIAA) | Platinum | 1,000,000^{^} |
^{^} Shipments figures based on certification alone.^{‡} Sales+streaming figures based on certification alone.

== Release history ==
| Region | Date | Format(s) | Label(s) | Ref. |
|---|---|---|---|---|
| United States | May 17, 1991 | —N/a | Jive; RCA | |
| Australia | July 29, 1991 | 12-inch vinyl | Jive | |
| Australia | August 19, 1991 | Cassette | Jive | |
| Australia | August 26, 1991 | CD | Jive | |

== Film adaptation ==
On September 22, 2021, Smith's production company Westbrook Studios and Davis Entertainment will co-produce the film adaptation with Peter Saji directing from his screenplay for Screen Gems.

== See also ==
- List of number-one R&B singles of 1991 (U.S.)
