= Parents Just Don't Understand =

Single by DJ Jazzy Jeff & the Fresh Prince

from the album He's the DJ, I'm the Rapper
- Released: February 17, 1988
- Recorded: 1987
- Studio: Battery Studios (London)
- Genre: Golden age hip-hop; comedy hip-hop
- Length: 4:13 (Radio edit); 4:43 (Video edit); 5:35 (Album version)
- Label: Jive
- Songwriters: Pete Harris, Will Smith, Jeffrey Townes
- Producers: Harris, Smith, Townes, Bryan "Chuck" New

DJ Jazzy Jeff & the Fresh Prince singles chronology
| "Brand New Funk" (1987) | "Parents Just Don't Understand" (1988) | "A Nightmare on My Street" (1988) |

Audio sample
- file; help

Music video
- "Parents Just Don't Understand" on YouTube

"Parents Just Don't Understand" is the second single from American duo DJ Jazzy Jeff & the Fresh Prince's second studio album, He's the DJ, I'm the Rapper (1988). In the song, the Fresh Prince details his problems with his parents, whom he feels do not understand the challenges of being a teenager.

The song was released as a single in spring 1988 by Jive and peaked at number 12 on the US Billboard Hot 100. It won a Grammy Award for Best Rap Performance at the 1989 Grammy Awards, one of the two songs to do so before the award was discontinued in 1991. The song was referenced several times in the television show The Fresh Prince of Bel-Air and was ranked number 96 on VH1's "100 Greatest Songs of Hip Hop". It was also featured in the movies The Parent Trap (1998), Jimmy Neutron: Boy Genius (2001) Malibu's Most Wanted (2003) and Jersey Girl (2004).

== Lyrics ==
In the first verse, the Prince recalls a trip to the Gallery Mall where his mother picked out embarrassing clothes for the new school year, including bell-bottoms and a butterfly-collared shirt. He tries to fake an illness to avoid wearing them on his first day, but is forced to attend school in the outfits, where he is promptly mocked by his peers.

In the second verse, the Prince recounts taking his parents' Porsche for a joyride while they were on vacation, despite not having a driver's license. He picked up an attractive young girl and took her to McDonald's, but his attempt to demonstrate the car's speed resulted in a police officer pulling him over. The girl was revealed to be a 12 year old runaway; The Prince was arrested and his parents were forced to cut their vacation short to bail him out, and his parents angrily beat him for his actions on the ride home.

== Critical reception ==
Jack Barron from NME wrote, "Over a hip-bone-quaking bass and horns that blow harder than a hurricane The Fresh Prince tells a domestic tale that halfway through turns into a nightmare when his mom buys him zits [sic] for his birthday and dresses him in flares. Mind you he's his own worst enemy, making typical mistakes like stealing his parents' car to impress his girlfriend and striking out until he gets arrested by the police for not having a licence. [...] Wack it up the next time you have an argument with your ma and pa."

== Notable cover versions ==
Lil' Romeo, 3LW, and Nick Cannon recorded a cover for the Jimmy Neutron: Boy Genius soundtrack in 2001. T-Squad covered the song in 2007 on their only album T-Squad.

Leslie Knope (Amy Poehler) sang part of the song in the cold open of season 2 episode 1 of Parks and Recreation, "Pawnee Zoo" in 2009.

== Track listing ==
- 7-inch vinyl
1. "Parents Just Don't Understand" – 4:13
2. "Parents Just Don't Understand" (Instrumental) – 4:06
- 12-inch vinyl
1. "Parents Just Don't Understand" (Danny D Mix) – 6:20
2. "Parents Just Don't Understand" (Original 7" Version) – 5:13
3. "Live at Union Square, November 1986" – 4:03
- American 12-inch vinyl
1. "Parents Just Don't Understand" (Extended Mix) – 5:27
2. "Parents Just Don't Understand" (Single Edit) – 4:13
3. "Parents Just Don't Understand" (Instrumental) – 4:06
4. "Live at Union Square, November 1986" – 4:03

== Charts ==
| Chart (1988) | Peak position |
|---|---|
| Australia (ARIA) | 49 |
| Canada Top Singles (RPM) | 28 |
| New Zealand (Recorded Music NZ) | 13 |
| UK Singles (OCC) | 87 |
| US Billboard Hot 100 | 12 |
| US Hot R&B/Hip-Hop Songs (Billboard) | 10 |

== Certifications ==
| Region | Certification | Certified units/sales |
|---|---|---|
| United States (RIAA) | Gold | 500,000^{^} |
^{^} Shipments figures based on certification alone.
