= DJ Jazzy Jeff =

American DJ, music producer and actor (born 1965)

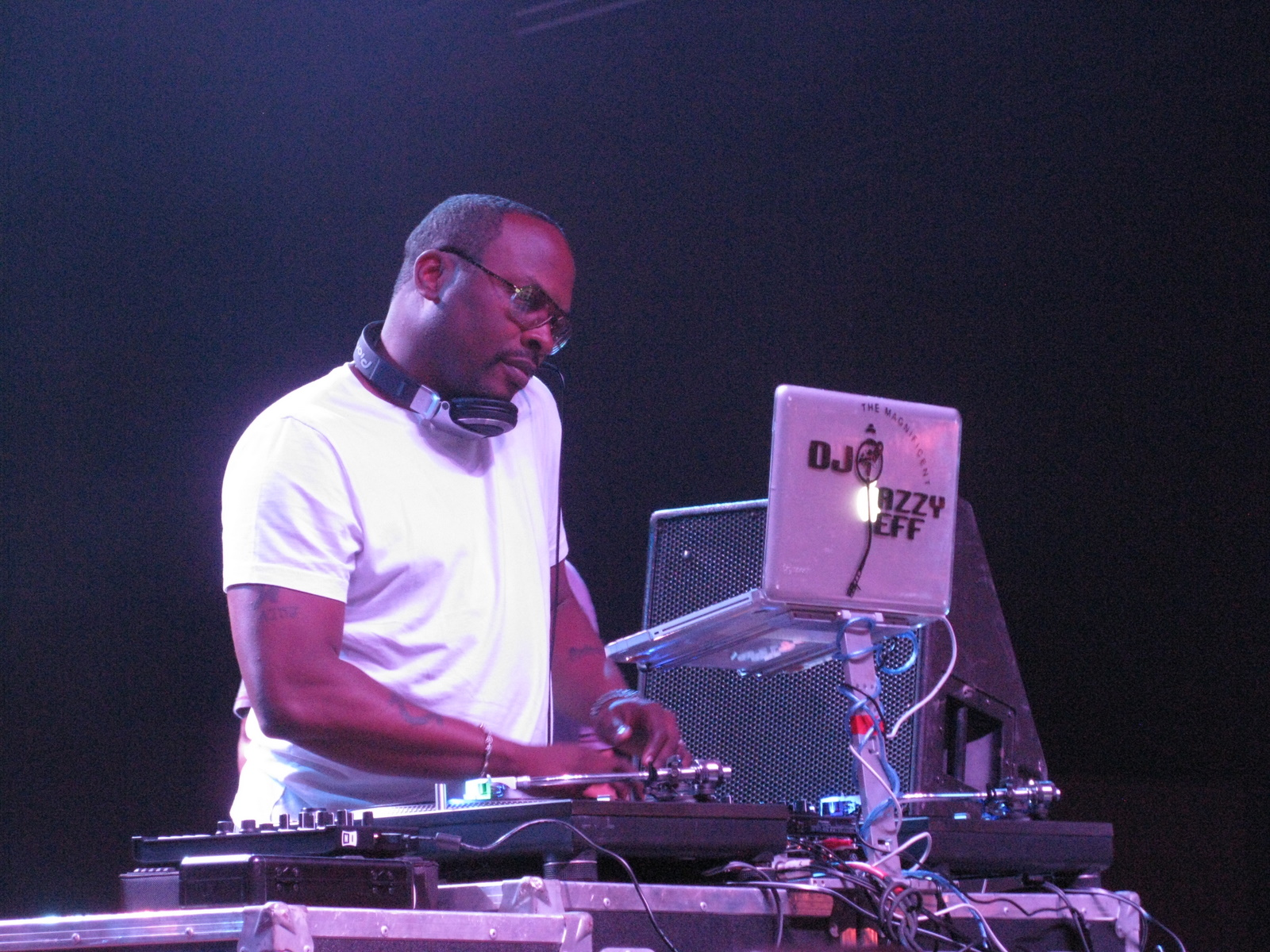
- DJ Jazzy Jeff in 2011

Background information
- Also known as: Jazz; Jazzy Jeff
- Born: Jeffrey Allen Townes; January 22, 1965 (age 61); Philadelphia, Pennsylvania, U.S.
- Genres: Hip-hop; R&B
- Occupations: DJ; record producer; actor
- Years active: 1985–present
- Labels: Rapster; Groovin'; BBE
- Formerly of: DJ Jazzy Jeff & the Fresh Prince
- Website: djjazzyjeff.com

Jeffrey Allen Townes (born January 22, 1965), better known by his stage name DJ Jazzy Jeff (or simply Jazz), is an American DJ, music producer and actor. He was one half of the hip-hop duo DJ Jazzy Jeff & the Fresh Prince, along with Will Smith. He is credited, along with DJ Spinbad and DJ Cash Money, with popularizing the transformer scratch.

== Early life and initial career ==
Townes was born on January 22, 1965, in Philadelphia, Pennsylvania. Raised in the area, Townes developed a reputation and a following as a local school and block party DJ.

He was ten years old when he first became interested in being a DJ. He told author Paul Stenning, "At summer time block parties I wouldn't be the one dancing, I sat where the DJ was set up, watching him. Even when I would go to other block parties in other neighborhoods I was still infatuated with the DJ. He was the guy that played music that everyone in the neighborhood loved. You might not have known his face, you might not have known his name but he was the guy that made everyone move."

He took the stage name DJ Jazzy Jeff. He was one half of the duo DJ Jazzy Jeff & the Fresh Prince, along with Will Smith. The group received the first Grammy Award for Best Rap Performance in 1989 for "Parents Just Don't Understand", though their most successful single was "Summertime" which earned the group their second Grammy and peaked at number 4 on the Billboard Hot 100.

== Career ==
=== Acting ===
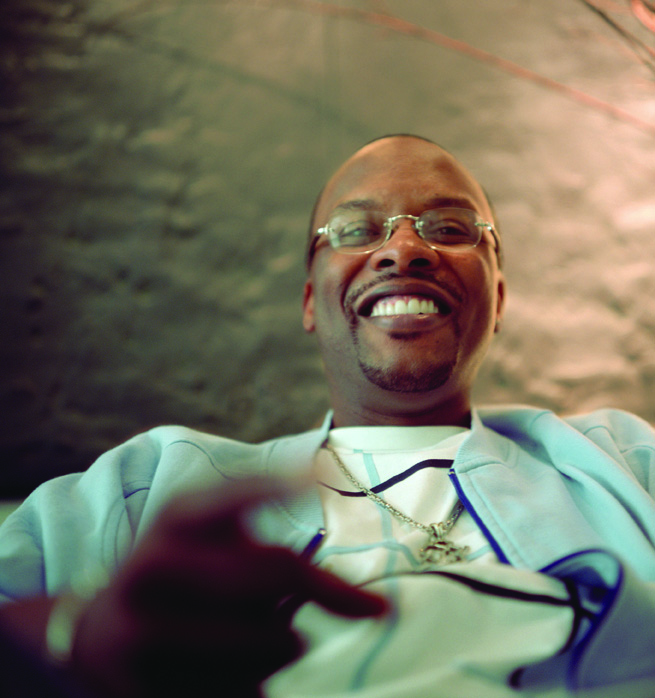
DJ Jazzy Jeff in Hamburg, Germany in 2002

When Smith branched out into television with the sitcom The Fresh Prince of Bel-Air, Jazzy Jeff played a character named Jazz, Smith's best friend on the show. Jazzy Jeff was initially a recurring character in the first season, but became a regular shortly thereafter. In the early seasons, the two characters always greeted each other with their signature handshake (swinging mid-five, point-back, snap with both characters saying "Pssh!"). A running joke throughout the show's run involved the character being physically ejected from the house by Uncle Phil (James Avery) while making a comical guttural scream, most often using the same footage for comedic effect, but sometimes filming new footage instead. Jazz had an unrequited crush on Hillary Banks (played by Karyn Parsons).

=== Music ===
One of the first records DJ Jazzy Jeff ever appeared on was with the Korner Boyz (Street Artz Records) and their songs "Bust the Move" and "The Saga of Roxanne", which featured legendary Philadelphia rappers MC Parry P and Grand Tone. The instrumental was called "Jazzy Jeff Scratch" (1985).

As a duo, DJ Jazzy Jeff & the Fresh Prince had several gold and platinum-selling albums and singles in the late 1980s and early 1990s, earning them the first rap Grammy Award ever presented in 1989 for "Parents Just Don't Understand".

At the time of winning the Grammy Award, DJ Jazzy Jeff came home crying as he had just $500 in the bank.

DJ Jazzy Jeff & the Fresh Prince also won a second Grammy for "Summertime".

After DJ Jazzy Jeff & the Fresh Prince broke up, Townes went on to become a prominent R&B, soul, and neo soul record producer and actor, establishing the A Touch of Jazz production company in his native Philadelphia. Among the artists that Jazzy Jeff has helped develop are Eric Roberson, Jill Scott, Musiq Soulchild, Eminem, the Roots, Raheem DeVaughn, Darius Rucker, Talib Kweli, Floetry, Rhymefest, and many more. Despite separating from Will Smith as a music partner, they remain close friends and occasionally work together.

Some songs by Smith were produced by Townes, and he has performed on some songs by Smith such as "So Fresh" and "Potnas". In addition, he appeared in several of Smith's music videos such as "Will2K" and "Freakin' It". On some occasions, he made appearances with Smith at live concerts, producing DJ scratches. On July 2, 2005, DJ Jazzy Jeff performed with Smith at the Live 8 concert in Philadelphia. Moreover, Smith acknowledges him in his music such as "Comin' to the Stage" from the album Lost and Found and "Potnas" from his album Willennium.

His 2007 release The Return of the Magnificent featured numerous collaborations with old school and new school artists including CL Smooth, Big Daddy Kane, Pos from De La Soul, Method Man, Peedi Peedi (a remake of "Brand New Funk"), Rhymefest, and Raheem DeVaughn. In 2007, he appeared with Rhymefest in a video directed by Konee Rok, in which he makes music in his home recording studio with Rhymefest.

In 2008, Townes performed with Smith at the premiere of the latter's 2008 film Hancock.

In 2009, he made a mixtape titled He's the King...I'm the DJ in honor of the late entertainer Michael Jackson. Townes was featured in the video game DJ Hero as a playable character. He also has some original mixes in the game.

In 2010, DJ Jazzy Jeff and Mick (formerly known as Mick Boogie) teamed up to release the Summertime: The Mixtape series. The mixes are released every summer.

In 2013, DJ Jazzy Jeff performed with Will Smith on The Graham Norton Show. Also that same year, DJ Jazzy Jeff released Vinyl Destination, a web series documenting his hundred plus DJ shows from all around the world. He also appeared as the lead interview in Paul Stenning's book Success – By Those Who've Made It.

In 2015, he performed the scratch overdubs for the film Straight Outta Compton.

In August 2017, DJ Jazzy Jeff and Will Smith performed two shows in Europe: MTV Summerblast Music Festival in Croatia and the Livewire Festival in Blackpool.

In 2024, he went on tour with New Kids on the Block as a supporting act, alongside Paula Abdul, on The Magic Summer Tour (2024).

In 2025, DJ Jazzy Jeff was announced as one of the remixers for the 2026 FIFA World Cup theme, representing Philadelphia.

== Personal life ==
DJ Jazzy Jeff married Lynette C. Jackson in Jamaica on July 31, 2010. He has four children: two sons from a previous relationship, Cory Townes, who is also a DJ and actor/musician Amir Mitchell-Townes, and a son (Pleasant) and daughter (August) with Jackson.

== Discography ==
=== Solo work as DJ Jazzy Jeff ===
- Unreleased album from Sony Records (1998)
- One cut in Battle of DJs
- The Magnificent EP (2002)
- The Magnificent (2002)
- Soulheaven Presents Jazzy Jeff in the House (2004)
- Hip-Hop Forever II (Rapster Records) (2004)
- The Soul Mixtape (Groovin' Records USA) (2005)
- Hip-Hop Forever III (BBE Records) (2006)
- The Return of The Magnificent EP (2007)
- The Return of the Magnificent (2007) No. 55 US (Gold)
- The Return of Hip Hop EP (2007)
- House of Tribes (T's Box) (2009)
- My Faves Volume 1 (mixtape) (2009)
- DJ Jazzy Jeff presents: Jeff's in the House Vol. 1 (mixtape) (2010)
- What Happens in Vegas (mixtape) (2011)
- LRG Life Colors (mixtape) (2012)
- M3 (album) (2018)

=== as DJ Jazzy Jeff & the Fresh Prince ===
- Rock the House (1987) No. 83 US (Gold); No. 97 UK
- He's the DJ, I'm the Rapper (1988) No. 4 US (3× Platinum); No. 68 UK
- And in This Corner... (1989) No. 39 US (Gold)
- Homebase (1991) No. 12 US (Platinum); No. 69 UK
- Code Red (1993) No. 64 US (Gold); No. 50 UK
- Greatest Hits (1998) No. 144 US, No. 20 UK
- Before The Willennium (1999)
- The Very Best of D.J. Jazzy Jeff & The Fresh Prince (2006)

=== Miscellaneous ===
- 1991: "Work It Out" with Monie Love from the soundtrack Boyz n the Hood
- 1991: "Deep, Deep, Trouble" (with The Simpsons) and the remixes from The Simpsons Sing the Blues
- 1997: "Jazzy Jeff's Theme" (from the album Nuyorican Soul)
- 1998: "When to Stand Up" (featuring Eminem)
- 1998: "I Don't Know" – Slum Village (scratches; from the album Fantastic, Vol. 2)
- 1999: "The Next Movement" – The Roots (scratches; from the album Things Fall Apart)
- 2004: "Mirrorball (DJ Jazzy Jeff Full Sole Remix)" (by Everything but the Girl; from the album Adapt or Die: 10 Years of Remixes)
- 2005: "Papa Was a Rollin' Stone (DJ Jazzy Jeff & Pete Kuzma Solefull Mix)" (by the Temptations; from Motown Remixed)
- 2005: Lost & Found (by Will Smith; produced the intro song "Here He Comes" and several DJ scratches on several tracks)
- 2005: "Watch Me" – Little Brother (scratches; from the album The Minstrel Show)
- 2006: "Feel It (Jazzy Jeff Soulful Remix)" (by The Black Eyed Peas; from Renegotiations: The Remixes)
- 2006: "Night in Tunisia (DJ Jazzy Jeff Remix)" (by Duke Jordan)
- 2006: "Foot in the Door" – Oddisee (mixed by DJ Jazzy Jeff)
- 2007: "NY Weather Report" – Talib Kweli (scratches; from the album Eardrum)
- 2007: "A Long Walk" – Jill Scott (made a cameo appearance in the music video)
- 2008: "Get Busy" – The Roots (scratches; from the album Rising Down)
- 2008: "Bring It Back" – Rhymefest (producer; from the album El Che)
- 2009: "Prince in Training" – MaC Renegade (hosted by DJ Jazzy Jeff)
- 2009: "Stay This Way (Jazzy Jeff Remix)" – by Peter Bjorn and John (featuring Big Pooh, Chaundon, and Phil Nash from the mixtape Re-Living Thing with Mick Boogie)
- 2010: Summertime: The Mixtape Vol. 1 – DJ Jazzy Jeff & MICK
- 2011: Back for More – DJ Jazzy Jeff & Ayah
- 2011: Summertime: The Mixtape Vol. 2 – DJ Jazzy Jeff & MICK
- 2011: "Shorti Bomb" – DJ Sat-One (with Chief Kamachi and DJ Jazzy Jeff)
- 2011: "No Strings (DJ Jazzy Jeff Roller Boogie Remix)" – Mayer Hawthorne
- 2012: Summertime: The Mixtape Vol. 3 – DJ Jazzy Jeff & MICK
- 2012: "92 Til Infinity" – Mac Miller
- 2012: "Girl of My Life" – Mint Condition (scratches; from the album Music @ the Speed of Life)
- 2013: Summertime: The Mixtape Vol. 4 – DJ Jazzy Jeff & MICK
- 2013: "Classic" – Shad (co-production with Skratch Bastid; from the EP The Spring Up)
- 2013: "Red Hot Flo (From Kokomo) (DJ Jazzy Jeff Remix)" – from Boardwalk Empire
- 2013: "Be Free (DJ Jazzy Jeff & James Poyser Remix" – Moonchild
- 2014: Summertime: The Mixtape Vol. 5 – DJ Jazzy Jeff & MICK
- 2014: "World is Our Playground (DJ Jazzy Jeff Remix)" – DJ Vice
- 2014: "We Are One (DJ Jazzy Jeff Remix)" – Terry Hunter (featuring Jay Adams)
- 2014: "Room Test" – Dayne Jordan (producer)
- 2014: "All About the Art" – Dayne Jordan and James Poyser (producer)
- 2014: "I Want It All" – Dayne Jordan (producer)
- 2014: "Play Dat!" – DJ Jazzy Jeff featuring Dayne Jordan
- 2014: "Lost" – Dayne Jordan (producer)
- 2014: "Fellow" – Dayne Jordan (producer)
- 2015: Summertime: The Mixtape Vol. 6 – DJ Jazzy Jeff & MICK
- 2016: Summertime: The Mixtape Vol. 7 – DJ Jazzy Jeff & MICK
- 2017: "Chasing Goosebumps" – The PLAYlist (executive producer)
- 2017: Summertime: The Mixtape Vol. 8 – DJ Jazzy Jeff & MICK
- 2020: "Gotta Be Dope" R.A. The Rugged Man feat. A-F-R-O and DJ Jazzy Jeff
