= DJ Jazzy Jeff & the Fresh Prince =

American hip-hop duo

- The Fresh Prince (left) and DJ Jazzy Jeff

Background information
- Origin: Philadelphia, Pennsylvania, U.S.
- Genres: Hip-hop; R&B
- Years active: 1985–1994
- Labels: Word-Up; Jive; RCA; BMG
- Past members: DJ Jazzy Jeff; The Fresh Prince

DJ Jazzy Jeff & the Fresh Prince were an American hip-hop duo from West Philadelphia, Pennsylvania, consisting of the rapper and actor Will Smith (the Fresh Prince) and the turntablist Jeff Townes (DJ Jazzy Jeff).

Active from 1985 to 1994 and occasionally thereafter, they were the third rap group in recording history to receive platinum certification, after Run-DMC and the Beastie Boys. They received the first Grammy Award for Best Rap Performance in 1989 for "Parents Just Don't Understand" (1988). Their most successful single was "Summertime" (1991), which earned them their second Grammy and reached number 4 on the Billboard Hot 100.

DJ Jazzy Jeff & the Fresh Prince have sold over 5.5 million albums in the US. Their most recent performance was in November 2023. Smith and Townes have also made songs under Smith's solo performer credit.

== Career ==
=== 1985–1988: early years and Rock the House ===
Jeff Townes was introduced to Will Smith at a house party during a performance in 1985, and Smith ended up filling in for Townes' missing hype man. They both felt a strong chemistry, and Townes was disappointed when his hype man finally made it to the party.

Soon after, the two decided to join forces. Smith enlisted a friend, Ready Rock C, to join as the beatboxer of the group. He was not officially credited to the duo, only as a support live member. In 1986, Philadelphia-based Word Records (later changed to Word-Up Records) released their first single "Girls Ain't Nothing but Trouble", which sampled the theme song of I Dream of Jeannie. Smith became known for light-hearted story-telling and profanity-free "battle" rhymes. The single became a hit a month before Smith graduated from high school.

Based on this success, the duo was brought to the attention of Jive Records and Russell Simmons. The duo's first album, Rock the House was released on Word Up in 1986 and rereleased on Jive in March 1987. The album sold approximately 300,000 units. That same year, the band embarked on its first major tour with Run-DMC and Public Enemy.

=== 1988–1989: He's the DJ, I'm the Rapper ===
Their 1988 follow-up album, He's the DJ, I'm the Rapper, made them multi-platinum stars. Mostly recorded in the United Kingdom, the album was a double-vinyl LP release; it was also issued as a single cassette and CD. "Parents Just Don't Understand", the lead-off single, made them MTV household names and also gained the honor of the first Grammy for a hip-hop/rap song, which was met with criticism. Nevertheless, the single was a success, launching the group into even more mainstream stardom. The video showed Prince's misadventures of trying to get around his parents' strict rules in a very comical way, much like their first single "Girls Ain't Nothing but Trouble". It gained considerable airplay on TV channels such as MTV, giving the group much attention. The song was played in an episode of The Fresh Prince of Bel-Air ("Someday Your Prince Will Be In Effect (Part 1)"), and referenced in two other episodes of the same series ("The Fresh Prince Project" and "Not With My Pig, You Don't").

Another single, "A Nightmare on My Street", showcased a fictional confrontation with A Nightmare on Elm Street villain Freddy Krueger. The record's release coincided with A Nightmare on Elm Street 4: The Dream Master, which caused legal threats from the movie's distributor New Line Cinema. In response, the corresponding music video was pulled from release and a legal disclaimer was included on later pressings of He's the DJ, I'm the Rapper denying affiliation with the film. The video was released by Jazzy Jeff in 2018.

Jeff reveals on track 19 of Skillz's Infamous Quotes mixtape that New Line Cinema approached Will & Jeff for a role in the movie House Party, which they turned down. The last single, track 3 from He's the DJ, I'm the Rapper, was "Brand New Funk", which sampled and quoted the James Brown funk song "My Thang". In narrative of the song, the Fresh Prince explains how Jeff has brought in a tape described to be startlingly good, which the Fresh Prince raps to, and how much people enjoyed it at the first performance. The song was well received by many hip-hop fans due to its funk sound, lyrical spins, and the fact that it showed off more of the skills of Jazzy Jeff. The video was shot in black and white, showed live performance clips from a concert and featured 2 Damn Hype Dancing.

=== 1989–1990: And in This Corner... ===
The group's third LP, And in This Corner..., was released in 1989. The album was a commercial success, selling over half a million copies and reaching Gold certification by the RIAA, although at this point the duo had decreased in popularity. The crossover style of the group was causing their fanbase to decline, as their initial audience felt they had become too accessible; non-crossover rap acts like Big Daddy Kane and Boogie Down Productions had bigger street followings; meanwhile, pop radio had latched on to new faces like Tone Loc and Young MC, while non-radio followers were more attracted to hardcore acts such as Ice-T and 2 Live Crew. The lead single, "I Think I Can Beat Mike Tyson", was similar to their other lead singles. The track narrates the Fresh Prince claiming he could beat Mike Tyson in a boxing match, and after training, is beaten in the first round. The music video features cameos from Mike Tyson, Chris Rock and Don King.

The next single was "Jazzy's Groove", sampling "Nautilus" in the chorus and bridge. The song features much more of Jazzy Jeff, like in "Brand New Funk"; Jazzy Jeff gives a 'math lesson' by making the sound clips add 1+1, 2+1, and 2+2. Due to a self-admitted spendthrift attitude, Smith felt he had nothing to lose when a producer from NBC and Quincy Jones approached him with an idea for a sitcom, with Townes appearing as a recurring character, named "Jazz". A popular running gag would have Uncle Phil (James Avery) throwing Jazz out of the house; however, this action is not restricted to Uncle Phil, as other characters, even Will himself, have thrown him out in the same manner. Another trademark on the show involved Jazz and Will greeting each other by slapping each other's hand, then swinging back in opposite directions while saying "Pssh!" The Fresh Prince of Bel-Air boosted his profile and his pocketbook. But Smith ended up squandering almost US$2.8m, while failing to pay any of it to the Internal Revenue Service in income taxation. Soon after And in This Corner... was released, Smith was found guilty of income-tax evasion by the IRS, and sentenced to pay this all back. For the first three seasons of The Fresh Prince of Bel-Air, Smith had 25% of his paycheck subjected to IRS garnishment.

In 1990, Ready Rock C decided not to continue as support. He later sued the duo alleging breach of contract, but lost in court.

=== 1991–1994: Homebase, Code Red and split ===
Still having a bit of extra money from starring in the successful sitcom, the duo decided to stage a comeback album in 1991, Homebase. The platinum album featured a more mature sound from the group, with Smith rapping in a deeper, consistent voice and changed their sound to fit the era's trend of hip-hop. Homebase featured the lead-off single "Summertime", which added rap lyrics to the music of the Kool & the Gang instrumental "Summer Madness" and has become one of their most enduring hits. The couple is seen being driven about while perched on a car in the film, which includes scenes from a family gathering in Philadelphia. The pair won their second Grammy for Summertime. "Ring My Bell" and "Things That U Do" were the ensuing singles. Both songs have the typical early 1990s' sound. A different rendition of each song from the one on the LP was featured in the videos.

The final single for the release was "You Saw My Blinker", a song about an old lady that crashed into Prince's new car and his anger at the events that happened thereafter. This is the first (and one of the only) songs where Smith curses, saying the word 'bitch' (To the left lane I tried to switch, then, you saw my blinker, bitch). Prince's voice is a bit deeper than usual, to make it sound like he's agitated, similar to "Then She Bit Me" from And in This Corner... This song reached No. 20 Billboard Hot 100 and No. 22 Hot R&B/Hip-Hop singles. In 1992 for the Barcelona Olympic Games the duo released the song "Higher Baby" as part of the compilation album Barcelona Gold.

Code Red, their last studio LP as a duo, was released in 1993, reaching gold sales. This LP featured a self-admitted harder sound than their other songs, with Jazzy Jeff saying "We wanted to take a new direction. It wasn't that we were concentrating on harder, it was just different", featuring more jazz and soul samples than previous releases. The lead single "Boom! Shake the Room" reached No. 1 in UK, Ireland, Spain and Australia, and featured a harder sound than any of their other songs. Other singles were "I'm Looking For the One (To Be with Me)", which is similar to "Summertime", and "I Wanna Rock", which showed off more of Jazzy Jeff's DJ skills. Shortly afterward, Smith began to pursue acting full-time and the duo split. He and Townes ended up being sued by Jive, who alleged that the duo was still under contract to create more albums.

== Occasional appearances ==
In 1998, the label released the compilation Greatest Hits with the hits and two previously unreleased songs. Years later, Will and Jazzy performed together sometimes in parties for close friends or selected events, but never announced a return as was credited as "DJ Jazzy Jeff & the Fresh Prince". In 2005, Smith and Townes performed together at the Philadelphia leg of Live 8. They performed in Croatia on August 26, 2017, Blackpool on August 27, and on Smith's 51st birthday on September 25, 2019. On November 8, 2023, DJ Jazzy Jeff and the Fresh Prince performed at the YouTube Theater in Inglewood California for “ A Grammy salute to 50 Years of Hip-Hop”

== Discography ==
- Rock the House (1987)
- He's the DJ, I'm the Rapper (1988)
- And in This Corner... (1989)
- Homebase (1991)
- Code Red (1993)

== Awards and nominations ==
=== American Music Awards ===
Year	Nominee / work	Award	Result
1989	DJ Jazzy Jeff & The Fresh Prince	Favorite Rap/Hip-Hop Artist	Won
1989	He's the DJ, I'm the Rapper	Favorite Rap/Hip-Hop Album	Won
1992	DJ Jazzy Jeff & The Fresh Prince	Favorite Soul/R&B Band/Duo/Group	Nominated
1992	DJ Jazzy Jeff & The Fresh Prince	Favorite Rap/Hip-Hop Artist	Nominated
1992	Homebase	Favorite Rap/Hip-Hop Album	Won

=== Grammy Awards ===
Year	Nominee / work	Award	Result
1989	"Parents Just Don't Understand"	Best Rap Performance	Won
1990	"I Think I Can Beat Mike Tyson"	Best Rap Performance	Nominated
1991	"And in This Corner..."	Best Rap Performance by a Duo or Group	Nominated
1992	"Summertime"	Best Rap Performance by a Duo or Group	Won

=== MTV Video Music Awards ===
Year	Nominee / work	Award	Result
1989	"Parents Just Don't Understand"	Best Rap Video	Won
1989	"Parents Just Don't Understand"	Best Direction	Nominated
1989	"Parents Just Don't Understand"	Best Art Direction	Nominated
1991	"Summertime"	Best Rap Video	Nominated

=== Soul Train Music Awards ===
Year	Nominee / work	Award	Result
1989	He's the DJ, I'm the Rapper	Best Rap Album	Won
