= Grandmaster Flash and the Furious Five discography =

- Studio albums: 2
- Compilation albums: 11
- Singles: 12

This is the discography of the American hip hop group Grandmaster Flash and the Furious Five.

== Albums ==
=== Studio albums ===
Year	Title	Chart positions				
Year	Title	US 200	US R&B	AUS	NZ	UK
1982	The Message: Released: October 3, 1982; Label: Sugar Hill Records	53	8	78	14	77
1988	On the Strength: Released: April 12, 1988; Label: Elektra Records	189	—	—	—	—
"—" denotes releases that did not chart or were not released in that territory.

=== Compilation albums ===
Year	Title	Chart positions			
Year	Title	US 200	US R&B	CAN	UK
1983	Grandmaster Flash & the Furious Five: Released: 1983; Label: Sugar Hill Records	—	—	—	—
1984	Greatest Messages: Released: 1984; Label: Sugar Hill Records	—	—	—	41
1993	The Greatest Hits: Released: 1993; Label: Sequel (UK)	—	—	—	—
1994	Message from Beat Street: The Best of Grandmaster Flash, Melle Mel & the Furious Five: Released: April 19, 1994; Label: Rhino Records	—	—	—	—
1996	The Adventures of Grandmaster Flash, Melle Mel & the Furious Five: More of the Best: Released: July 1, 1996; Label: Rhino Records	—	—	—	—
1997	The Greatest Mixes: Released: 1997; Label: Sanctuary	—	—	—	—
1999	Adventures on the Wheels of Steel: Released: 1999; Label: Castle Music	—	—	—	—
1999	The Showdown: The Sugarhill Gang Vs. Grandmaster Flash & The Furious Five: Released: February 2, 1999; Label: Rhino Records / Warner-Elektra-Atlantic	—	—	—	—
2005	Essential Cuts: Released: June 27, 2005; Label: Union Square Music	—	—	—	—
2006	Grandmaster Flash, Melle Mel and the Furious Five: The Definitive Groove Collection: Released: August 8, 2006; Label: Rhino Records	—	—	—	—
2007	The Essential: Released: February 12, 2007; Label: Union Square Music	—	—	—	—
2010	Kings of the Streets: Released: 2010; Label: Sanctuary / Universal	—	—	—	—
"—" denotes releases that did not chart or were not released in that territory.

=== During the disbandment ===
==== Grandmaster Flash ====
Year	Title	Chart positions			
Year	Title	US 200	US R&B	CAN	UK
1985	They Said It Couldn't Be Done: Released: 1985; Label: Elektra Records	—	35	—	95
1986	The Source: Released: 1986; Label: Elektra Records	145	27	—	—
1987	Ba-Dop-Boom-Bang: Released: 1987; Label: Elektra Records	197	43	—	—
"—" denotes releases that did not chart or were not released in that territory.

==== Grandmaster Melle Mel and the Furious Five ====
Year	Title	Chart positions			
Year	Title	US 200	US R&B	CAN	UK
1984	Grandmaster Melle Mel and the Furious Five: Released: 1984; Label: Sugar Hill Records	—	43	—	45
1989	Piano: Released: 1989; Label: New Day Records	—	—	—	—
"—" denotes releases that did not chart or were not released in that territory.

== Singles ==
Year	Single	Peak chart positions							Album
Year	Single	US Hot 100	US R&B	US Club Play	AUS	IRL	NZ	UK	Album
1979	"We Rap More Mellow" (The Younger Generation)	—	—	—	—	—	—	—	N/A
1979	"Flash to the Beat" (live) (credited as Flash and the Furious 5)	—	—	—	—	—	—	—	N/A
1979	"Superappin'"	—	—	—	—	—	—	—	N/A
1980	"Freedom"	—	19	37	—	—	—	—	N/A
1980	"The Birthday Party"	—	36	83	—	—	—	—	N/A
1981	"The Adventures of Grandmaster Flash on the Wheels of Steel"	—	55	—	—	—	—	—	N/A
1981	"Showdown" (credited as The Furious Five meets The Sugarhill Gang)	—	49	—	—	—	—	—	N/A
1981	"It's Nasty (Genius of Love)"	—	22	—	—	—	—	—	The Message
1982	"The Message"	62	4	12	21	14	2	8	The Message
1982	"Scorpio"	—	30	—	—	—	—	77	The Message
1983	"New York New York"	—	17	—	—	—	49	82	Greatest Messages
1988	"Gold"	—	—	—	—	—	—	—	On the Strength
1988	"Magic Carpet Ride" (featuring Steppenwolf)	—	—	—	—	—	—	—	On the Strength
"—" denotes releases that did not chart or were not released in that territory.

=== During the disbandment ===
==== Grandmaster Flash ====
Year	Single	Peak chart positions		Album
Year	Single	US R&B	UK	Album
1984	"Sign of the Times"	55	72	They Said It Couldn't Be Done
1985	"Alternate Groove"	—	—	They Said It Couldn't Be Done
1985	"Girls Love the Way He Spins"	54	—	They Said It Couldn't Be Done
1986	"Behind Closed Doors"	—	—	The Source
1986	"Style (Peter Gunn Theme)"	54	—	The Source
1987	"All Wrapped Up"	—	—	Ba-Dop-Boom-Bang
1987	"U Know What Time It Is"	57	—	Ba-Dop-Boom-Bang
"—" denotes releases that did not chart or were not released in that territory.

==== Grandmaster Melle Mel and the Furious Five ====
Year	Single	Peak chart positions						Certifications	Album
Year	Single	US R&B	US Club Play	AUS	IRL	NZ	UK	Certifications	Album
1982	"Message II (Survival)" (credited as Melle Mel & Duke Bootee)	32	—	—	—	—	74		N/A
1983	"White Lines (Don't Don't Do It)" (credited as Grandmaster & Melle Mel)	47	9	27	22	45	7	BPI: Silver	Grandmaster Melle Mel and the Furious Five
1984	"Beat Street Breakdown"	8	—	48	—	47	42		Beat Street
1984	"Jesse"	73	—	—	—	—	83		N/A
1984	"Step Off"	—	—	—	9	—	8		N/A
1984	"We Don't Work for Free"	—	—	—	—	—	45		Grandmaster Melle Mel and the Furious Five
1985	"King of the Streets"	—	—	—	—	—	—		N/A
1985	"Pump Me Up"	—	—	—	—	—	45		N/A
1985	"World War III"	—	—	—	—	—	97		Grandmaster Melle Mel and the Furious Five
1985	"Vice"	—	—	—	—	—	—		Miami Vice I
"—" denotes releases that did not chart or were not released in that territory.
