= The Essential (Grandmaster Flash and the Furious Five album) =

The Essential Grandmaster Flash

Compilation album by Grandmaster Flash and the Furious Five
- Released: 2007
- Genre: Hip-hop
- Length: 56:25 (CD1); 55:17 (CD2)
- Label: Union Square Music; METRDCD606
- Producer: Joey Robinson Jr, Sylvia Robinson, Larry Johnson, Michael Johnson, Jiggs Chase, E. Fletcher, Melle Mel

Grandmaster Flash and the Furious Five chronology
Grandmaster Flash, Melle Mel and the Furious Five: The Definitive Groove Collection (2006)	The Essential Grandmaster Flash (2007)	The Bridge (Concept of a Culture) (2009)

Professional ratings
Review scores
Source	Rating
Allmusic	4.5/5 stars

The Essential is a 2CD slipcased compilation album by Grandmaster Flash and the Furious Five. It was released in 2007 on the Union Square Music label. Although titled to Grandmaster Flash alone (and containing no photos of the Furious Five), it does not contain any tracks from Flash's later Elektra Records albums and mainly features tracks from The Message era and subsequent singles. The eight-page booklet contains a brief October 2006 essay by Quinton Scott and features pictures of Flash from the photo session originally used for his Essential Mix: Classic Edition album.

The rear slipcase and sleeve notes state that the set contains "all the classics from Grandmaster Flash & The Furious Five in their glorious original versions." Despite this, several tracks are edited and mistakes have been made regarding the group credits and song titles (see notes).

== Track listing ==
CD1

1. "The Birthday Party" (Grandmaster Flash & the Furious Five) – 5:47
2. "Freedom" (Grandmaster Flash & the Furious Five) – 5:07
3. "The Message" (Grandmaster Flash and the Furious Five) – 3:12
4. "New York New York" (Grandmaster Flash & the Furious Five) – 7:21
5. "The Adventures of Grandmaster Flash on the Wheels of Steel" (Grandmaster Flash & the Furious Five) – 7:10
6. "It's Nasty (Genius of Love)" (Grandmaster Flash) – 7:51
7. "Scorpio" (Grandmaster Flash & the Furious Five) – 4:44
8. "She's Fresh" (Grandmaster Flash & the Furious Five) – 4:56
9. "Showdown" (The Furious Five meet Sugarhill Gang) – 5:53
10. "Flash to the Beat (Pt. 1)" (Grandmaster Flash) – 4:22

CD2

1. "White Lines (Don't Do It)" (Grandmaster Flash & Melle Mel) – 4:29
2. "Pump Me Up" (Grandmaster Flash & the Furious Five) – 4:44
3. "Step Off" (The Furious Five Feat. Cowboy, Melle Mel & Scorpio) – 7:08
4. "Beat Street Breakdown" (Grandmaster Flash, Melle Mel & The Furious Five) – 5:11
5. "Jesse" (Grandmaster Flash, Melle Mel & The Furious Five) – 5:07
6. "The Message II (Survival)" (Grandmaster Flash & the Furious Five, Melle Mel & Duke Bootee) – 6:45
7. "Freestyle" (Grandmaster Flash, Melle Mel & The Furious Five) – 4:46
8. "King of the Streets" (Grandmaster Melle Mel) – 5:13
9. "We Don't Work for Free" (Grandmaster Melle Mel & the Furious Five) – 5:01
10. "Internationally Known Pt. 1" (Grandmaster Flash & the Furious Five) – 6:52

== Notes ==
CD1

- "The Birthday Party", "Freedom", and "The Message" are the edited versions.
- "It's Nasty (Genius of Love)" is incorrectly credited. It should be credited to Grandmaster Flash and the Furious Five.
- "Showdown" is incorrectly credited. It should be credited to The Furious Five meets The Sugarhill Gang.
- "Flash to the Beat (Pt. 1)" is mistitled. The correct title is "Flash to the Beat (Part 1)"

CD2

- "White Lines (Don't Do It)" and "Jesse" are the edited versions.
- "White Lines (Don't Do It)" is incorrectly credited. It was originally credited to Grandmaster Flash and the Furious Five and as Grandmaster and Melle Mel but never to Grandmaster Flash and Melle Mel.
- "Pump Me Up" and "Beat Street Breakdown" are incorrectly credited. They should both be credited to Grandmaster Melle Mel and the Furious Five.
- "Jesse" is incorrectly credited. It has been credited to Grandmaster and Melle Mel, Grandmaster Melle Mel and even Grandmaster Flash and Melle Mel but never to Grandmaster Flash, Melle Mel & The Furious Five.
- "The Message II (Survival)" is both mistitled and incorrectly credited. The correct title is simply "Message II (Survival)" and it should be credited to Melle Mel and Duke Bootee.
- "Freestyle" is incorrectly credited. It should be credited to Grandmaster Melle Mel and the Furious Five.
- "Internationally Known Pt. 1" is incorrectly titled and credited. The correct title for the full version is simply "Internationally Known" or "Internationally Known Part 1 & 2" and it should be credited to Grandmaster Melle Mel and the Furious Five.
