= Message from Beat Street: The Best of Grandmaster Flash, Melle Mel & the Furious Five =

1994 album

Greatest hits album by Grandmaster Flash and the Furious Five and Grandmaster Melle Mel
- Released: 19 April 1994
- Recorded: 1980–1985
- Genres: Hip-hop, funk
- Length: 72:23
- Labels: Rhino Entertainment; R2 71606
- Producers: Joey Robinson Jr, Sylvia Robinson, Larry Johnson, Michael Johnson, Jiggs Chase, E. Fletcher, Melle Mel

Grandmaster Flash and the Furious Five and Grandmaster Melle Mel chronology
Greatest Hits (1993)	Message from Beat Street: The Best of Grandmaster Flash, Melle Mel & the Furious Five (1994)	The Adventures of Grandmaster Flash, Melle Mel & the Furious Five: More of the Best (1996)

Professional ratings
Review scores
Source	Rating
The Village Voice	A

Message from Beat Street: The Best of Grandmaster Flash, Melle Mel & the Furious Five is a 1994 CD compilation album released on the Rhino Entertainment record label in the US. It consists of tracks recorded by the various versions of Grandmaster Flash and the Furious Five and Grandmaster Melle Mel. No tracks from the three Grandmaster Flash albums on Elektra Records are included or anything from the 1988 comeback album On the Strength.

The fold-out booklet contains an essay by Shannita Williams, Rap Editor of Hits Magazine. Strangely, it also features two unrelated photos of the later Grandmaster Flash line-up.

In addition, the credits state that all the tracks are taken from the original Sugar Hill Records 12" singles, although in several cases often unnecessary fade edits have been made (see below). These are not present on the future compilation albums Adventures on the Wheels of Steel (1999) or Grandmaster Flash, Melle Mel and the Furious Five: The Definitive Groove Collection (2006). No explanation is provided for this.

The credits also state that the group titles "are authentic to the original 12" labels and illustrate the variations and inconsistencies with regard to artist listings". However, the majority of the original releases do not use ampersands. Finally, Rahiem's name is misspelled throughout as Raheem.

== Track listing ==
1. "Step Off Megamix" (Grandmaster Melle Mel & the Furious Five) – 5:03 (*)
2. "Freedom" (Grandmaster Flash & the Furious Five) – 8:04
3. "The Birthday Party" (Grandmaster Flash & the Furious Five) – 5:47
4. "Showdown" (The Furious Five meets the Sugarhill Gang) – 5:33
5. "It's Nasty (Genius of Love)" (Grand Master Flash and the Furious Five) – 7:39
6. "The Message" (Grandmaster Flash & the Furious Five featuring Melle Mel & Duke Bootee) – 7:03
7. "Scorpio" (Grand Master Flash & the Furious Five) – 4:48
8. "Message II (Survival)" – (Melle Mel & Duke Bootee) – 6:36
9. "New York New York" (Grand Master Flash & the Furious Five) – 7:14
10. "White Lines (Don't Don't Do It)" (Grandmaster & Melle Mel) – 7:27
11. "Beat Street" (Grand Master Melle Mel & the Furious Five with Mr. Ness & Cowboy) – 7:07

== Notes ==
- (*) The credits state that "Step Off Megamix" is a new recording although it was previously released (uncensored) as The Mega-Melle Mix in 1985.
- "The Birthday Party" is edited. The full version runs to 8:21 approximately.
- "Showdown" is slightly edited. The full version runs to 5:55 approximately.
- "It's Nasty (Genius of Love)" is slightly edited. The full version runs to 7:53 approximately.
- "The Message" is edited. The full version runs to 7:13 approximately.
- Message II (Survival)" is slightly edited. The full version runs to 6:50 approximately.
- "New York New York" is slightly edited. The full version runs to 7:21 approximately.
- "White Lines (Don't Do It)" is slightly edited. The full version runs to 7:38 approximately.
