= Adventures on the Wheels of Steel =

1999 Hip-hop compilation album

Compilation album by Grandmaster Flash and the Furious Five and Grandmaster Melle Mel
- Released: 1999
- Genre: Hip-hop
- Length: 74:43 / 71:27 / 64:11
- Labels: Castle Music; NXTCD 305

Grandmaster Flash and the Furious Five and Grandmaster Melle Mel chronology
Flash Is Back (1998)	Adventures on the Wheels of Steel (1999)	The Showdown: The Sugarhill Gang Vs. Grandmaster Flash & The Furious Five (1999)

Professional ratings
Review scores
Source	Rating
Allmusic	4.5/5 stars

Adventures on the Wheels of Steel is a 3CD compilation album by Grandmaster Flash and the Furious Five and Grandmaster Melle Mel. It was released in 1999 on the Castle Music label and is a boxed set containing three CDs in slimline jewel cases together with a fold out insert.

This set contains a mixture of tracks by the various incarnations of Grandmaster Flash and the Furious Five including their debut Super Rappin' No 1 and Grandmaster Melle Mel. Several errors are present with regard to the correct artist. Two previously unreleased tracks are included (*).

The foldout booklet repeats the essay by Lewis Dene (Blues & Soul Magazine) from October 1997 that originally appeared on the album The Greatest Mixes.

== Track listing ==
CD1

1. "Freedom" (Grandmaster Flash and the Furious Five) – 8:18
2. "The Birthday Party" (Grandmaster Flash and the Furious Five) – 8:21
3. "The Adventures of Grandmaster Flash on the Wheels of Steel" (Grandmaster Flash) – 7:13
4. "Showdown" (The Furious Five meets The Sugarhill Gang) – 5:55
5. "It's Nasty (Genius of Love)" (Grandmaster Flash and the Furious Five) – 7:53
6. "Flash to the Beat (Parts 1 & 2)" (Grandmaster Flash) – 10:49
7. "The Message" (Grandmaster Flash and the Furious Five featuring Melle Mel and Duke Bootee) – 7:13
8. "Scorpio" (Grandmaster Flash and the Furious Five) – 4:54
9. "Message II (Survival)" (Melle Mel and Duke Bootee) – 6:54
10. "New York New York" (Grandmaster Flash and the Furious Five) – 7:26

CD2

1. "White Lines (Don't Do It)" (Grandmaster Flash and Melle Mel) – 7:39
2. "Jesse" (Grandmaster Melle Mel) – 6:13
3. "Beat Street" (Grandmaster Melle Mel & the Furious Five with Mr. Ness & Cowboy) – 7:07
4. "We Don't Work for Free" (Grandmaster Melle Mel and the Furious Five) – 5:03
5. "Step Off" (Furious Five featuring Melle Mel & Scorpio) – 7:22
6. "Pump Me Up" (Grandmaster Melle Mel and the Furious Five) – 4:40
7. "Mega-Melle Mix" (Grandmaster Melle Mel) – 5:00
8. "King of the Streets" (Grandmaster Melle Mel) – 5:11
9. "Vice" (Grandmaster Melle Mel) – 5:05
10. "Street Walker" (Mass Production with special guest Grandmaster Melle Mel) – 6:14
11. "Super Rappin' No 1" (Grandmaster Flash and the Furious Five) – 12.03

CD3

1. "Trinidad Spot" (Grandmaster Melle Mel) – 0:39
2. "She's Fresh" (Grandmaster Flash and the Furious Five) – 4:56
3. "It's A Shame (Mt. Airy Groove)" (Grandmaster Flash and the Furious Five) – 4:58
4. "Internationally Known" (Grandmaster Melle Mel and the Furious Five) – 6:50
5. "Hustlers Convention" (Grandmaster Melle Mel and the Furious Five) – 6:15
6. "The Truth" (Grandmaster Melle Mel and the Furious Five) – 4:18
7. "World War III" (Grandmaster Melle Mel and the Furious Five) – 8:48
8. "The New Adventures of Grandmaster" (Grandmaster Melle Mel and the Furious Five) – 5:40
9. "Freestyle" (Grandmaster Melle Mel and the Furious Five) – 4:46
10. "Black Man" (Grandmaster Melle Mel and the Furious Five) – 4:00
11. "Drug Wars" (Grandmaster Melle Mel and the Furious Five) – 4:46
12. "Kick the Knowledge" (Grandmaster Melle Mel and the Furious Five) – 4:18 *
13. "D.C. Cab" (Grandmaster Melle Mel and the Furious Five) – 4:22 *

== Notes ==
- "The Adventures of Grandmaster Flash on the Wheels of Steel" is incorrectly credited. It should be credited to 'Grandmaster Flash and the Furious Five'.
- "White Lines (Don't Do It)" has also been credited to 'Grandmaster Flash and the Furious Five' and as 'Grandmaster and Melle Mel'.
- "Beat Street" was also released in an edited version as Beat Street Breakdown.
- "Step Off" is incorrectly credited. It should be credited to 'Grandmaster Melle Mel and the Furious Five'.
- "Mega-Melle Mix" has also been released as Step Off Megamix.
- "Trinidad Spot" is a radio advert for then upcoming shows in Trinidad on July 8 and 9.
- "Internationally Known" is incorrectly credited. It should be credited to Grandmaster Melle Mel and the Furious Five. It originally appeared on Greatest Messages.
- "Hustlers Convention" has the word 'shit' bleeped out.
- "The Truth" is the slightly edited version. It is also incorrectly credited. It should be credited to 'Grandmaster Melle Mel and the Furious Five'.
- "D.C. Cab" was re-written and released as "Jesse".
