= Essential Cuts =

Compilation album by Grandmaster Flash and the Furious Five
- Released: June 27, 2005
- Recorded: 1980–1984
- Genre: Funk, hip-hop
- Length: 70:40
- Label: Union Square Music; METRCD166
- Producer: Joey Robinson Jr, Sylvia Robinson, Larry Johnson, Michael Johnson, Jiggs Chase, E. Fletcher, Melle Mel

Grandmaster Flash and the Furious Five chronology
Essential Mix: Classic Edition (2002)	Essential Cuts (2005)	Grandmaster Flash, Melle Mel and the Furious Five: The Definitive Groove Collection (2006)

Professional ratings
Review scores
Source	Rating
Allmusic	4.5/5 stars

Essential Cuts is a budget compilation album by Grandmaster Flash and the Furious Five released on CD in 2005. Although titled to Grandmaster Flash alone, it does not contain any tracks from Flash's later Elektra Records albums and mainly features tracks from The Message era.

The fold-out booklet contains a brief but accurate history of the band and track-by-track commentary by Ian McCann. As is common with Grandmaster Flash and the Furious Five compilation releases minor mistakes have been made regarding some song titles (see notes).

== Track listing ==
1. "The Adventures of Grandmaster Flash on the Wheels of Steel" – 7:10
2. "Freedom" – 5:06
3. "The Message" – 3:12
4. "It's Nasty" – 7:50
5. "New York New York" – 7:20
6. "Scorpio" – 4:44
7. "White Lines (Don't Do It)" – 4:28
8. "Dreamin'" – 5:47
9. "The Birthday Party" – 5:46
10. "She's Fresh" – 4:57
11. "It's a Shame (Mt Airy Groove)" – 4:57
12. "Flash to the Beat (Part 1)" – 4:23
13. "You Are" – 4:51

== Notes ==
- "The Adventures of Grandmaster Flash on the Wheels of Steel" is mistitled as simply Adventures on the Wheels of Steel.
- Although sometimes originally subtitled as "It's Nasty" (Genius of Love), it is here mistitled as the (Genius of Love Version). It is also lacks the (with the Furious Five) appellation that is present on the other tracks.
- "New York New York" is mistitled as New York, New York.
- "Flash to the Beat (Part 1)" is mistitled as simply Flash to the Beat.
- "Freedom", "The Message", "Scorpio", "White Lines (Don't Do It)" and "The Birthday Party" are the edited versions.
