= Flash Is Back =

Studio album by Grandmaster Flash
- Released: 1998
- Genre: Hip-hop
- Length: 60:51
- Label: Marlboro Music; 74321 621432
- Producer: Arthur Baker

Grandmaster Flash chronology
| The Greatest Mixes (1997) | Flash Is Back (1998) | Adventures on the Wheels of Steel (1999) |

Flash Is Back is the sixth studio album released in 1998 by Grandmaster Flash. The music was co-written with Arthur Baker with Flash writing all the lyrics. It was his first studio release since On the Strength in 1988 and his first solo album since Ba-Dop-Boom-Bang in 1987. He would not release another studio album until The Bridge (Concept of a Culture) in 2009.

It was released on Marlboro Music in Germany only and was distributed by BMG. A double vinyl LP and a CD version were issued. No singles were released from the album.

== Track listing ==
1. "Groove to Get Down" – 4:14
2. "Gotta Get Busy" – 4:53
3. "Whatever the Hell It's Working" – 5:20
4. "This Is the Way" – 4:30
5. "Sex on the Scratch" – 4:53
6. "Coolcuts" – 4:55
7. "Let's Have Some Action" – 2:56
8. "Brothers Be Fronting" – 2:55
9. "Flashes Theme" – 3:51
10. "Little Bit of Flash" (Midfield General Skint Mix) – 8:04
11. "Flash Is Back" (Danielson for Skint Mix) – 5:27
12. "Dance to the Beat" (Grandmaster Flash vs Stretch & Vern) – 8:50
