= Grandmaster Flash, Melle Mel and the Furious Five: The Definitive Groove Collection =

2006 album

The Definitive Groove Collection

Compilation album by Grandmaster Flash and the Furious Five and Grandmaster Melle Mel
- Released: 2006
- Genre: Hip-hop
- Length: 74:51 / 73:40
- Label: Rhino Records; R2 74081

Grandmaster Flash and the Furious Five and Grandmaster Melle Mel chronology
Essential Cuts (2005)	The Definitive Groove Collection (2006)	The Essential Grandmaster Flash (2007)

Grandmaster Flash, Melle Mel and the Furious Five: The Definitive Groove Collection is a double CD compilation album by Grandmaster Flash and the Furious Five released in 2006 on Rhino Records. It contains original full-length tracks by the various versions (*and their spellings) of both Grandmaster Flash and Grandmaster Melle Mel.

The 16-page booklet contains group photos and an essay on the history of Grandmaster Flash and the Furious Five by Oliver Wang.

== Track listing ==
CD1

1. "Freedom" (Grandmaster Flash & The Furious 5) - 8:18
2. "The Birthday Party" (Grandmaster Flash & The Furious Five) - 8:22
3. "The Adventures of Grandmaster Flash on the Wheels of Steel" (Grandmaster Flash & the Furious Five) - 7:10
4. "Showdown" (The Furious Five meets The Sugarhill Gang) - 5:54
5. "It's Nasty (Genius Of Love)" (Grand Master Flash & The Furious Five) - 7:52
6. "Flash to the Beat (Part 1)" (Grand Master Flash) - 4:28
7. "The Message" (Grand Master Flash & The Furious Five featuring Melle Mel & Duke Bootee) - 7:14
8. "Scorpio" (Grand Master Flash & The Furious Five) - 4:57
9. "Message II (Survival)" (Melle Mel & Duke Bootee) - 6:55
10. "New York New York" (Grand Master Flash & The Furious Five) - 7:26
11. "Jesse" (Grandmaster Melle Mel) - 6:12

CD2

1. "White Lines (Don't Do It)" (Grandmaster & Melle Mel) - 7:40
2. "Beat Street" (Grand Master Melle Mel & The Furious Five, with Mr. Ness & Cowboy) - 7:05
3. "Internationally Known" (Grand Master Melle Mel & The Furious Five, with Mr. Ness & Cowboy) - 6:32
4. "We Don't Work For Free" (Grandmaster Melle Mel & The Furious Five) - 5:00
5. "Step Off" (The Furious Five, featuring Cowboy, Melle Mel & Scorpio) - 7:24
6. "Pump Me Up" (Grandmaster Melle Mel & The Furious Five) - 4:52
7. "World War III" (Melle Mel) - 8:20
8. "Sign Of The Times" (Grandmaster Flash) - 6:11
9. "Girls Love The way He Spins" (Grandmaster Flash) - 6:36
10. "Vice (from Miami Vice)" - (Grandmaster Melle Mel) - 5:03
11. "Style (Peter Gunn Theme)" (Extended Remixed Version) (Grandmaster Flash) - 5:03
12. "U Know What Time It Is" (Extended Scratch Version) (Grandmaster Flash) - 3:52 (**)

== Notes ==
- Group's Official Website
- The Kidd Creole's Official Website

(*) The various group names and their spellings are as listed on the CD sleeve. Various other arrangements are known to exist. For example, White Lines (Don't Do It) was initially released as 'Grandmaster Flash and the Furious Five'. It has also been released as 'Grandmaster Flash and Melle Mel'. Step Off was originally released as 'Grandmaster Melle Mel and the Furious Five'.

(**) Also known as the 'Extended Version'.
