= New York New York (Grandmaster Flash and the Furious Five song) =

Single by Grandmaster Flash and the Furious Five
- Released: 1983
- Genre: Hip-hop
- Length: 7:21
- Label: Sugar Hill
- Songwriters: Edward Fletcher; Melvin Glover; Sylvia Robinson
- Producer: Sylvia Inc.

Grandmaster Flash and the Furious Five singles chronology
| "The Message" (1982) | "New York New York" (1983) | "Gold" (1988) |

"New York New York" is a song by the American hip-hop group Grandmaster Flash and the Furious Five, released as a single in 1983 through Sugar Hill Records. Though it does not feature on any of their studio albums, the song appears on multiple of their compilation albums, including Grandmaster Flash & the Furious Five (1983) and Greatest Messages (1984). Written by Duke Bootee, Melle Mel, and Sylvia Robinson, "New York New York" explores the downsides of living in New York City and the struggles it entails.

One of their most commercially successful singles, "New York New York" charted in multiple countries, reaching No. 17 on the R&B Singles chart, No. 49 on the New Zealand Singles Chart and No. 82 on the UK singles chart.

== Composition and lyrics ==
Lyrically, "New York New York" explores the challenges of living in New York City, highlighting the poverty and crime present in the city. Taking a "realist" perspective on life in the city, it also explores topics such as greed, mental illness, and police brutality. The song's portrayal of New York City has been described as "sarcastic", as it uses the same tone when describing positive aspects of the city.

== Release and reception ==
"New York New York" was released in 1983 as a 12" single via the Sugar Hill Records record label. At the time of its release, the song was one of Grandmaster Flash and the Furious Five's most commercially successful singles, only surpassed by their previous release, "The Message" (1982).

The track has received praise in retrospective reviews by music critics. Andrew Hamilton of AllMusic described "New York New York" as a "sarcastic tribute to New York City", seeing the representation of the city within the song as "unflattering, but rocking". Revolt TV included the song on their list of the best hip hop anthems about New York City, stating that the song "showcases the early days of Hip Hop while offering a raw perspective on the city." They praised the production from Grandmaster Flash, as well as Melle Mel's storytelling throughout, which "highlight the duality of New York: A city of dreams and harsh realities." Billboard included the song on a similar list, calling it a "slice of realist hip-hop", and that despite its dark subject matter, "the funkiness of the track adds a certain allure."

== Track listing ==
12": SH-457

1. "New York New York" (Vocal) – 7:21
2. "New York New York" (Instrumental) – 7:21

== Charts ==
| Chart (1983) | Peak position |
|---|---|
| US Billboard Hot Black Singles | 17 |
| New Zealand Singles Chart | 49 |
| UK Singles Chart | 82 |
