= The Greatest Mixes =

Remix album by Grandmaster Flash and the Furious Five
- Released: 1997
- Genre: Hip hop
- Length: 72:11
- Label: Deepbeat Records/Castle Music

Grandmaster Flash and the Furious Five chronology
Salsoul Jam 2000 (1997)	The Greatest Mixes (1997)	Flash Is Back (1998)

Professional ratings
Review scores
Source	Rating
AllMusic	3/5 stars

The Greatest Mixes is a remix compilation album by Grandmaster Flash and the Furious Five released in 1998 in the UK by Deepbeat Records/Castle Music.

== Overview ==
The Greatest Mixes contains rare unreleased tracks and remixes from both Grandmaster Flash and the Furious Five and Melle Mel. The LP's foldout sleeve also contains a summarised biography of Grandmaster Flash and the Furious Five by Lewis Dene of Blues & Soul. The Greatest Mixes was later reissued in 2002.

== Track listing ==
No.	Title	Length
1.	"White Lines (Don't Do It)" (Cutmaster Swift and Pogo Remix)	4:11
2.	"Step Off" (Extended Mix)	7:36
3.	"Drug Wars" (Extended Mix)	4:46
4.	"Pump Me Up" (Extended Mix)	4:43
5.	"Message II (Survival)" (Richie Rich Mix)	6:19
6.	"Freestyle"	4:46
7.	"New York, New York" (Extended Mix)	7:20
8.	"Beat Street Breakdown" (Extended Mix)	5:11
9.	"The Message" (Cutting Edge's Old School Mix)	9:03
10.	"The Adventures of Grandmaster Flash on the Wheels of Steel" (Extended Mix)	7:06
11.	"Black Man"	3:59
12.	"White Lines (Don't Don't Do It)" (Davidson Ospina Club Mix)	7:09
