= Greatest Messages =

Compilation album by Grandmaster Flash and the Furious Five
- Released: January 1, 1984
- Genre: Hip-hop, funk
- Label: Sugar Hill/MCA Records; SH-9121
- Producer: Sylvia Inc.

Grandmaster Flash and the Furious Five chronology
Grandmaster Flash & the Furious Five (1983)	Greatest Messages (1984)	They Said It Couldn't Be Done (1985)

Professional ratings
Review scores
Source	Rating
Allmusic	4.5/5 stars
The Village Voice	B+
Sounds	3.5/5 stars

Greatest Messages is a compilation album release by Grandmaster Flash and the Furious Five (On the Strength is their official second album). It was released in January 1984, and it is a compilation of their Sugar Hill Records hit singles including "The Message". Over half of the tracks were single-only releases prior to this compilation. Singles from Melle Mel are also on this compilation.

The jacket, labels, and liners of this recording incorrectly pluralize the title as Greatest Message's.

== Track listing ==
=== US and international edition ===
Vinyl LP and Cassette

1. "Freedom" – 8:14
2. "The Birthday Party" – 5:42
3. "Flash to the Beat" – 4:27
4. "It's Nasty (Genius of Love)" – 4:20
5. "The Message" – 4:44
6. "Scorpio" – 4:55
7. "Message II (Survival)" – 6:37
8. "New York, New York" – 7:24

=== UK edition ===
Vinyl LP

1. "The Message"
2. "Survival (Message II)"
3. "Freedom"
4. "Flash to the Beat"
5. "Jesse"
6. "White Lines"
7. "New York, New York"
8. "Internationally Known"
9. "Birthday Party"
10. "Adventures on the Wheels of Steel"

Cassette

1. "The Message"
2. "Survival (Message II)"
3. "Freedom"
4. "Flash to the Beat"
5. "Jesse"
6. "It's Nasty (Genius of Love)"
7. "White Lines"
8. "New York, New York"
9. "Internationally Known"
10. "Birthday Party"
11. "Adventures on the Wheels of Steel"
12. "Scorpio"
