= The Message (Grandmaster Flash and the Furious Five album) =

Studio album by Grandmaster Flash and the Furious Five
- Released: October 3, 1982
- Studio: Sweet Mountain (Englewood, New Jersey)
- Genre: Old-school hip-hop
- Length: 36:58
- Label: Sugar Hill
- Producers: Jigsaw Productions; Sylvia Robinson

Grandmaster Flash and the Furious Five chronology
The Message (1982)	Grandmaster Flash & the Furious Five (1983)

Melle Mel chronology
The Message (1982)	Grandmaster Melle Mel and the Furious Five (1984)

Singles from The Message
- 1. "It's Nasty" Released: 1981; 2. "Scorpio" Released: 1982; 3. "The Message" Released: July 1, 1982

The Message is the debut studio album by American hip-hop group Grandmaster Flash and the Furious Five, released on October 3, 1982, by Sugar Hill Records. It features the influential title track and hip-hop single "The Message".

== Release and critical reception ==
Retrospective professional reviews
Review scores
Source	Rating
AllMusic	4.5/5 stars
Christgau's Record Guide: The '80s	A–
The Encyclopedia of Popular Music	4/5 stars
The New Rolling Stone Album Guide	4/5 stars
Pitchfork	6.4/10
Tom Hull – on the Web	A−
Uncut	3/5 stars

The Message was released in October 1982 by Sugar Hill Records. The album charted at No. 53 in the United States and at No. 77 in the United Kingdom.

Reviewing in December 1982 for The New York Times, Robert Palmer hailed The Message as the year's best album and explained that while the emerging rap genre had often been criticized for confining itself to "bragging and boasting ... The Message is different. It's a gritty, plain-spoken, vividly cinematic portrait of black street life...social realism has rarely worked well in a pop-music context, but The Message is an utterly convincing cry of frustration and despair that cannot be ignored." Robert Christgau ranked it as the 21st best album of 1982 on his list for The Village Voice's annual Pazz & Jop critics' poll. In Christgau's Record Guide: The '80s (1990), he wrote that, although "She's Fresh" is the "only instant killer", each song's attempt to experiment and "touch a lot of bases with a broad demographic ... justifies itself".

According to music journalist Tom Breihan, The Message was a "singles-plus filler cash-in" that proved "a fascinating time capsule of rap's early attempts with the album format" as well as "a full-length artistic breakthrough, a rap album that earned respect on its own terms". In a retrospective review, AllMusic's Ron Wynn called it the "ultimate peak" for Grandmaster Flash and the Furious Five, naming the title track as its highlight. Miles Marshall Lewis, reviewing the album's 2002 British reissue in The New Rolling Stone Album Guide (2004), cited "The Adventures of Grandmaster Flash on the Wheels of Steel" as the "clincher" and "the only prime-period example of Flash's ability to set and shatter moods, with his turntables and faders running through a collage of at least 10 records that sound like hundreds." Mark Richardson from Pitchfork said that The Message featured "two absolutely essential songs"—the title track and "Scorpio," which he dubbed "the greatest early electro track." However, he felt the rest of the songs were inferior. The album was also included in the book 1001 Albums You Must Hear Before You Die (2006).

== Track listing ==
No.	Title	Writer(s)	Length
1.	"She's Fresh"	Milton Edwards	4:57
2.	"It's Nasty"	Tina Weymouth; Christopher Frantz; Steven Stanley; Adrian Belew; Aaron Copland	4:19
3.	"Scorpio"	Melvin Glover; Nathaniel Glover; Eddie Morris; Keith Wiggins; Guy Williams	4:55
4.	"It's a Shame (Mt. Airy Groove)"	Curtis Harmon; James Lloyd; Cedric Napoleon; Lee Garrett; Syreeta Wright; Stevie Wonder	4:57
5.	"Dreamin'"	M. Glover; N. Glover; Wiggins; Morris; Williams; Gary Henry	5:47
6.	"You Are"	Henry	4:51
7.	"The Message"	M. Glover; Edward Fletcher; Sylvia Robinson; Clifton Chase	7:12

1982 UK LP / 2002 European CD reissue
No.	Title	Composer(s)	Length
8.	"The Adventures of Grandmaster Flash on the Wheels of Steel"	Robinson; M. Glover; Gabrielle Jackson; Jiggs Chase; Gwendolyn Chisolm; Cheryl Cook; Michael Wright; Guy O'Brien; John Richard Deacon; Joseph Saddler; Angela Brown	7:06

2010 expanded edition
No.	Title	Composer(s)	Length
8.	"Message II (Survival)"	Robinson; M. Glover	6:46
9.	"New York New York"	Robinson; Fletcher; Reginald Lamar Griffin; M. Glover	7:19
10.	"The Adventures of Grandmaster Himself"	Unknown	5:45
11.	"The Message (Instrumental Version)"	Fletcher; Chase; Robinson; M. Glover	7:11

2019 Record Store Day blue double vinyl expanded edition
No.	Title	Composer(s)	Length
8.	"The Adventures of Grandmaster Flash on the Wheels of Steel"	Robinson; M. Glover; Jackson; Chase; Chisolm; Cook; M. Wright; O'Brien; Deacon; Saddler; Brown	7:06
9.	"The Message (Instrumental Version)"	Fletcher; Chase; Robinson; M. Glover	7:08
10.	"New York New York"	Robinson; Fletcher; Griffin; M. Glover	7:25
11.	"Message II (Survival)"	Robinson; M. Glover	6:46
12.	"The Birthday Party"	Robinson; M. Glover	8:19
13.	"Freedom (Instrumental Version)"	Robinson	8:13

Sample credits

- "She's Fresh" contains samples from "It's Just Begun" by the Jimmy Castor Bunch and "The Lovomaniacs" by Boobie Knight.
- "It's Nasty" contains samples from "Genius of Love" by Tom Tom Club and the opening interpolates Fanfare for the Common Man by Aaron Copland.
- "It's a Shame" contains samples from "Mt. Airy Groove" by Pieces of a Dream.
- "The Adventures of Grandmaster Flash on the Wheels of Steel" contains samples from "Good Times" by Chic, "Apache" by the Incredible Bongo Band, "Rapture" by Blondie, "Another One Bites the Dust" by Queen, "8th Wonder" by the Sugarhill Gang, "Monster Jam" by the Sequence, "Glow of Love" by Change and "Life Story" by the Hellers.

== Personnel ==
Grandmaster Flash and the Furious Five

- Grandmaster Flash (Joseph Saddler) – turntables, drum machine programming, Flashformer transform DJ device, background vocals
- Kidd Creole (Nathaniel Glover Jr.) – lead and background vocals, writer and arranger
- Keef Cowboy (Keith Wiggins) – lead and background vocals, writer and arranger
- Grandmaster Melle Mel (Melvin Glover) – lead and background vocals, writer and arranger
- Scorpio (Eddie Morris) – lead and background vocals, writer and arranger
- Rahiem (Guy Todd Williams) – lead and background vocals, writer and arranger

Additional musicians

- Doug Wimbish – bass
- Skip McDonald – guitar
- Reggie Griffin – Prophet-5
- Jiggs – Prophet-5
- Sylvia Robinson – Prophet-5
- Gary Henry – keyboards
- Dwain Mitchell – keyboards
- Keith LeBlanc – drums
- Ed Fletcher (Duke Bootee) – percussion, co-lead vocals on "The Message"
- Chops Horn Section – brass

== Charts ==
=== Album ===
Chart (1982)	Peak position
New Zealand Albums (RIANZ)	14
UK Albums Chart	77
U.S. Billboard 200	53
U.S. Top Black Albums	8
Chart (1983)	Peak position
Australian (Kent Music Report)	78

=== Singles ===
Year	Single	Peak chart positions					
Year	Single	U.S. Hot 100	U.S. R&B	U.S. Club Play	AUS	NZ	UK
1981	"It's Nasty (Genius of Love)"	—	22	—	—	—	
1981	"Scorpio"	—	30	—	—	77	
1982	"The Message"	62	4	12	21	2	8

== Bibliography ==
- Christgau, Robert (1990). Christgau's Record Guide: The '80s. Pantheon Books. ISBN 067973015X.
- Larkin, Colin (2006). The Encyclopedia of Popular Music: Selected Albums. Bibliographies (4th ed.). Muze. ISBN 0195313739.
- Lewis, Miles Marshall; et al. (2004). Brackett, Nathan; Hoard, Christian (eds.). The New Rolling Stone Album Guide (4th ed.). Simon & Schuster. ISBN 0-7432-0169-8.
- Strong, Martin C. (2004). The Great Rock Discography (7th ed.). Canongate U.S. p. 4. ISBN 1841956155.
