= They Said It Couldn't Be Done =

Studio album by Grandmaster Flash
- Released: 1985
- Genre: Hip hop
- Length: 46:42
- Label: Elektra; 60389
- Producer: Grandmaster Flash, Gavin Christopher

Grandmaster Flash chronology
Greatest Messages (1984)	They Said It Couldn't Be Done (1985)	The Source (1986)

Professional ratings
Review scores
Source	Rating
Pitchfork	4.6/10
Record Mirror	2/5 stars
Smash Hits	4/10
The Village Voice	C+

They Said It Couldn't Be Done is an album by Grandmaster Flash, released in 1985. It is his second overall studio album, and his first album credited solely to him following the breakup of the Furious Five due to the departure of rappers Melle Mel, Scorpio, and Keith Cowboy. For They Said It Couldn't Be Done, Flash signed with Elektra Records and retained the services of Rahiem and The Kidd Creole. New rappers Lavon (Kevin LaVon Dukes), Mr Broadway (Russell Wheeler), and dancer Larry Love (Larry Parker) were added. The album was re-issued on CD in the US for the first time on April 26, 2005 (DBK Works dbk514).

It was the first album the group released on a major label. It was produced by Gavin Christopher and Grandmaster Flash (the group). The album also included "Girls Love the Way He Spins", "Sign of the Times", "Paradise" and "Rock the House (Alternate Groove)". It was the first hip hop album released by Elektra Records.

== Track listing ==
1. "Girls Love the Way He Spins" – 6:34
2. "The Joint Is Jumpin'" – 3:44
3. "Rock the House" – 5:45
4. "Jailbait" – 4:52
5. "Sign of the Times" – 6:09
6. "Larry's Dance Theme" – 3:21
7. "Who's That Lady" – 5:26
8. "Alternate Groove" – 5:26
9. "Paradise" – 5:24

== Personnel ==
- Grandmaster Flash – Arranger, spinner and background vocals
- The Kidd Creole – writer, arranger and background vocals
- Rahiem – Lead and background vocals, rapper, arranger and writer
- La Von Dukes – (Kevin L. Dukes) writer, rapper, arranger, Bass Guitar and background vocals
- Mr. Broadway – Rapper, background vocals
- Larry Love – Dancer, specializing in Electric Boogie, background vocals

== Musicians ==
- Gavin Christopher – drum machine programming, Simmons toms and percussion, OB8 synthesizer bass
- Grandmaster Flash, Dave Ogrin, Paul Pesco – additional drum programming
- Gavin Christopher, Vince Madison, Dave Ogrin, Terry Marshall, Rahiem, Grandmaster Flash – keyboards
- Vince Madison, Gavin Christopher – Oberheim system programming
- Paul Pesco, Richard Davis – guitars
- Michael A. Levine - sampling keyboards
