= The Official Adventures of Grandmaster Flash =

Compilation album (DJ mix) by Grandmaster Flash
- Released: January 29, 2002
- Genre: Rap, electronic music
- Length: 78:00
- Label: Strut; STRUTCD 011
- Producer: Grandmaster Flash

Grandmaster Flash chronology
The Showdown: The Sugarhill Gang Vs. Grandmaster Flash & The Furious Five (1999)	The Official Adventures of Grandmaster Flash (2002)	Essential Mix: Classic Edition (2002)

The Official Adventures of Grandmaster Flash is a DJ mix album by Grandmaster Flash and was released in January 2002. It is a mix album consisting of interview snippets, newly recorded old school hip hop mixes, live Grandmaster Flash and the Furious Five segments and four other tracks by various artists that were popular in Flash's early DJ repertoire.

The enclosed 36-page colour booklet contains an extensive and detailed history of Grandmaster Flash, with many photos and interviews with the characters involved and was written by Frank Broughton and Bill Brewster (authors of Last Night a DJ Saved My Life).

== Music ==
The album is a compilation of music from the late 1970s and early 1980s including DJ mix sets from Grand Master Flash and tracks that influenced classic hip-hop such as Kraftwerk's "Trans-Europe Express" and Babe Ruth's "The Mexican".

== Reception ==
Professional ratings
Review scores
Source	Rating
Allmusic	4.5/5 stars
Muzik	4/5 stars
Rolling Stone Album Guide	4/5 stars

Will Ashon of Muzik awarded the album a four out of five rating, stating that "True b-boys will be appalled by the small silver thing this is housed on. The rest of us can just enjoy a well put together reconstruction of the beautiful crime of hip hop." Noel Dix of Exclaim! stated the highlight of the discs were the mixes by Grandmaster Flash, that "Flash proves that he was creating breaks and juggles that are still emulated by some of hip-hop's most elite DJs to this day." and that "the amount of time and effort that Strut has put into this edition, and the importance of Grandmaster Flash himself, this is a very worthwhile album to look into for not only fans of hip-hop, but for every genre that it's influenced."

In 2003, Spin included the album on their list of "Essential Old-School Hip-Hop". In the 2004 issue of The Rolling Stone Album Guide, a reviewer referred to the album as "rather skimpy" being "padded by brief interview segments and four vintage jams" but declared that the album "becomes nearly essential however, because it contains four restless scratchedelic, funk-filled "turntable mixes" by Flash that are the first and so far only released followups to "Wheels of Steel".

== Track listing ==
1. Intro – "The Turntable Scientist" – 1:17
2. Grandmaster Flash Turntable Mix – "Flash Tears The Roof Off" – 9:32
3. "The Mexican" – Babe Ruth – 5:42
4. "Grandmaster Flash Live At The T-Connection '79" – 0:23
5. Grandmaster Flash Turntable Mix – "Flash Got More Bounce" – 12:04
6. "Trans Europe Express" – Kraftwerk – 7:35
7. Grandmaster Flash Interview – "Females" – 1:19
8. "Do What You Gotta Do" – Eddie Drennon & The BBS Orchestra – 3:51
9. Grandmaster Flash Turntable Mix – "Freestyle Mix" – 12:09
10. "Grandmaster Flash Live at Disco Convention '82" – 0:28
11. "Computer Games" – Yellow Magic Orchestra – 6:29
12. Grandmaster Flash Interview – "Set It Off" – 1:11
13. Grandmaster Flash Turntable Mix – "Get Off Your Horse & Jam!" – 15:13
14. "Untitled" – 0:37
