= Grandmaster Melle Mel and the Furious Five =

1984 Sugarhill Records album, without Grandmaster Flash

Studio album by Grandmaster Melle Mel and the Furious Five
- Released: 1984
- Genre: Hip hop; R&B
- Length: 45:48
- Label: Sugar Hill
- Producer: Arthur Baker

Melle Mel chronology
The Message (Grandmaster Flash and the Furious Five) (1982)	Grandmaster Melle Mel and the Furious Five (1984)	On the Strength (Grandmaster Flash and the Furious Five) (1988)

Professional ratings
Review scores
Source	Rating
The Village Voice	B+

Grandmaster Melle Mel and the Furious Five was released in 1984 by Sugarhill Records after the split between Grandmaster Flash and Melle Mel. For this album, Melle Mel kept the group name 'the Furious Five' (although the line-up had changed) and used the title 'Grandmaster'. Rappers Cowboy and Scorpio left with Melle Mel although Mel's brother Kidd Creole (N. Glover) and Rahiem remained with Flash. New rappers King Lou, Kami Kaze, and Tommy Gunn joined, as did Flash's best friend E. Z. Mike as DJ.

In some territories outside the US, the album had the title Work Party.

The album saw its first reissue on CD in 2005 by Collectors' Choice Music (CCM-582-2).

== Track listing ==
1. "Hustlers Convention" – 6:14
2. "Yesterday" – 4:55
3. "At the Party" – 3:40
4. "White Lines (New Re-mix)" – 4:29
5. "We Don't Work For Free" – 4:07
6. "The Truth" – 5:06
7. "World War III" – 8:11
8. "Can't Keep Running Away" – 4:34
9. "The New Adventures of Grandmaster" – 5:39

== Personnel ==
- Melle Mel – Vocals
- Scorpio – Vocals
- Cowboy – Vocals
- Tommy Gunn – Vocals
- Kami Kaze – Vocals
- King Lou – Vocals
- Clayton Savage – Vocals
- Grandmaster E. Z. Mike – Spinner

== Musicians ==
- Horn section – Sammy Lowe
- Bass – Doug Wimbish
- Guitars – Bernard Alexander
- Keyboards – Clayton Savage and Scorpio
- Drum programming – Scorpio
- Lead singers on Yesterday, At the Party and Can't Keep Running Away – Scorpio and Clayton Savage
- All scratching executed by Leland Robinson (Vicious Lee)

== Credits ==
Produced by Melle Mel, Scorpio and Cowboy with the exception of White Lines and Hustlers Convention.

White Lines and Hustlers Convention produced by Sylvia Robinson and Melle Mel.
