= Right Now (Grandmaster Mele-Mel & Scorpio album) =

Studio album by Grandmaster Mele-Mel & Scorpio
- Released: April 8, 1997
- Recorded: 1996–1997
- Genre: Old-school hip hop Hardcore hip hop East Coast hip hop
- Length: 54:12
- Label: Str8 Game Records
- Producer: Melle Mel; Scorpio; David Chackler

Melle Mel chronology
Piano (1989)	Right Now (1997)	Muscles (2007)

Professional ratings
Review scores
Source	Rating
AllMusic	2/5 stars

Right Now is an album by former Furious Five members, Grandmaster Melle Mel and Scorpio. The album was released on April 8, 1997, for Str8 Game Records and was produced by Melle Mel and Scorpio. The album was a critical and commercial failure and did not make it to the billboard charts. Two singles were released "Mama" and "Mr. Big Stuff" but neither of the two made it the billboard charts either.

The European release had the interview snippets removed and the track listing altered. The front and rear artwork was also reversed.

== Track listing ==
=== US version (Str8 Game Records, STG 1204-2) ===
1. "Intro" – 0:27
2. "On The Down Low" – 3:04
3. "Interview" – 0:28
4. "Mama" – 4:28
5. "Interview" – 0:34
6. "If..." – 5:22
7. "Interview" – 0:26
8. "Right Now" – 4:46
9. "Interview" – 0:35
10. "When You Lose A Child" – 4:51
11. "Interview" – 0:25
12. "China White" – 3:19
13. "Interview" – 0:24
14. "Broke Ass Niggas" – 3:54
15. "Interview" – 0:10
16. "Smackin' Rappers" – 3:31
17. "Interview" – 0:28
18. "New York – L.A." – 4:33
19. "Interview" – 0:29
20. "Stupid Mutha Fuckas" – 3:39
21. "Interview" – 0:25
22. "Sex You..." – 3:52
23. "Interview" – 0:20
24. "Mr. Big Stuff" – 3:32

=== European version (Str8 Game Records / EDEL, 0098862RAP) ===
1. "Stupid Mutha Fuckas" – 3:39
2. "Mama" – 4:28
3. "If..." – 5:22
4. "Right Now" – 4:46
5. "When You Lose A Child" – 4:51
6. "China White" – 3:19
7. "Broke Ass Niggas" – 3:54
8. "Smackin' Rappers" – 3:31
9. "New York – L.A." – 4:33
10. "On The Down Low" – 3:04
11. "Sex You..." – 3:52
12. "Mr. Big Stuff" – 3:32

== Notes ==
- "China White" is a re-recorded version of "White Lines (Don't Do It)."
