= Scorpio (Grandmaster Flash and The Furious Five song) =

Single by Grandmaster Flash and the Furious Five

from the album The Message
- B-side: "It's a Shame (Mt. Airy Groove)"
- Released: 1982
- Recorded: 1981
- Genre: Electro, old-school hip hop
- Length: 3:10; 4:50; 5:10
- Label: Sugar Hill Records; Teldec
- Songwriters: Melvin Glover, Nathaniel Glover Jr, Eddie Morris, Keith Wiggins, Guy Williams
- Producers: Sylvia Inc. Jigsaw Prod.

Grandmaster Flash and the Furious Five singles chronology
"It's Nasty (Genius of Love)" (1981)	"Scorpio" (1982)	"The Message" (1982)

Scorpio is a 1981 song by Grandmaster Flash and the Furious Five, released in 1982 as a single from their album The Message (1982). It reached #30 on the R&B Singles chart and #77 on the UK singles chart. It was dubbed the "greatest early electro track" by Mark Richardson in his album review for Pitchfork Media. The track was named after one of the members of the group, rapper Scorpio (Eddie Morris aka Mr. Ness).

== Track listing ==
Promo version

1. Scorpio – 5:10
2. Scorpio – 5:10

Other versions

1. Scorpio – 3:03 or 4:50 (dependent on version)
2. It's a Shame (Mt. Airy Groove) – 4:58

== Personnel ==
- Producer – Jigsaw Prod., Sylvia Robinson
- Written by – The Furious Five
