= Duke Bootee =

American record producer and rapper (1951–2021)

- Born: Edward Gernel Fletcher; June 6, 1951
- Origin: Elizabeth, New Jersey
- Died: January 13, 2021 (aged 69)
- Genres: Hip-hop
- Occupations: Record producer; rapper
- Instruments: Percussion; vocals
- Years active: 1982–1992
- Label: Sugar Hill

Edward Gernel Fletcher, known by his stage name Duke Bootee (June 6, 1951 – January 13, 2021), was an American record producer and rapper.

Born and raised in Elizabeth, New Jersey, his best known single, "The Message", was written in his basement with Clifton "Jiggs" Chase and was released in 1982 on Sugar Hill Records, featuring rappers Duke Bootee and Melle Mel. The record label marketed the song under the name Grandmaster Flash and the Furious Five. Later, he collaborated again with Melle Mel on the singles "Message II (Survival)", and "New York New York", in which the latter was credited to Grandmaster Flash and the Furious Five.

After concluding his music career in the early 1990s, Duke Bootee acquired teaching certification and became an educator in the Plainfield (NJ) Public School District. Later, Duke Bootee was a professor of English at Montclair State and Savannah State Universities.

He died January 13, 2021, of end-stage congestive heart failure.

== Discography ==
- Bust Me Out (1984)
