= Muscles (album) =

Studio album by Mele Mel
- Released: January 23, 2007
- Recorded: 2006
- Genres: Native American rap Hardcore rap East Coast rap
- Label: Power House Entertainment
- Producers: Melle Mel; Frank G

Mele Mel chronology
Right Now (1997)	Muscles (2007)

Muscles is the debut solo album by hip hop musician Mele Mel. Despite being involved in the hip hop industry since 1978 and having appeared on numerous important singles and songs, Muscles is Mele Mel's first full-length album as a solo performer.

It was released January 23, 2007, on Power House Entertainment and was produced by Mele Mel and Frank G. The album was a commercial failure. One single was released: "M-3: The New Message" on download and 12-inch promo (simply titled "M-3" on the album). Both album and single failed to chart on any list.

== Track listing ==
1. "Ice Cube Intro / Blow" – 2:17
2. "The Clapper" – 4:01
3. "New Truck" – 4:52
4. "M-3" – 4:11
5. "Left, Right, Left" – 4:40
6. "Muscles" – 4:12
7. "One More" – 4:17
8. "Dimelo (featuring Lynx)" – 4:06
9. "Hit List" – 4:11
10. "Move" – 4:22
11. "Another Hot Track" – 4:02
12. "Oh! What a Night" – 3:56
13. "Tha Bushes" – 6:31
14. "Cotton" – 4:30
15. "Crossfire" – 5:15
16. "Sellin' Those Things" – 4:09
