= Melle Mel =

American rapper (born 1961)

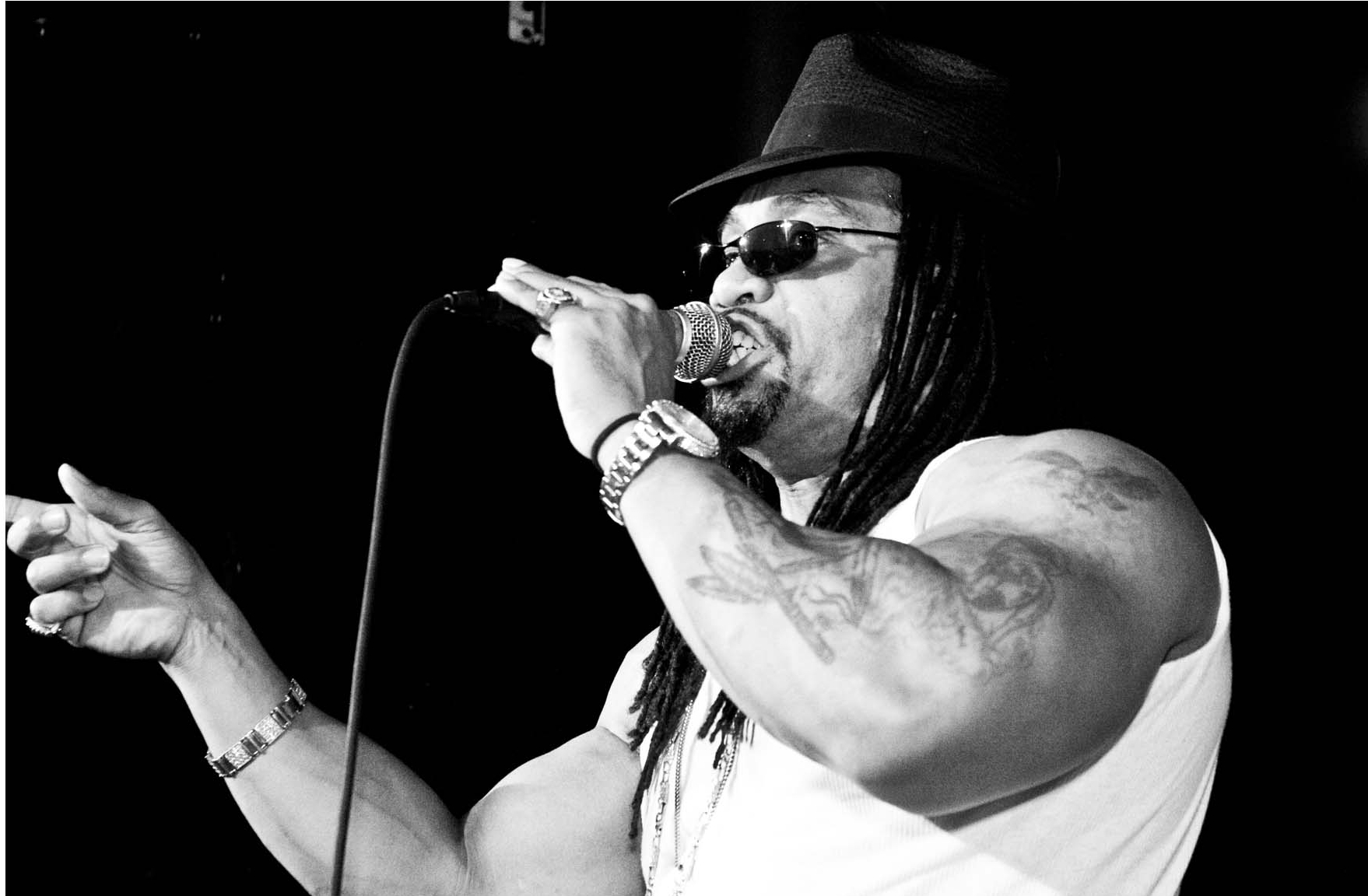
- Mel in 2010

Background information
- Also known as: Grandmaster Melle Mel
- Born: Melvin Glover; May 15, 1961 (age 65); The Bronx, New York City, U.S.
- Genres: Hip-hop; East Coast hip-hop; hardcore hip-hop; old-school hip-hop; G-funk; electro hop
- Occupations: Rapper; songwriter
- Instrument: Vocals
- Years active: 1978–present
- Labels: Enjoy; Sugar Hill
- Formerly of: Grandmaster Flash and the Furious Five

Melvin Glover (born May 15, 1961), better known by his stage name Grandmaster Melle Mel or simply Melle Mel (/ˈmɛli mɛl/), is an American rapper who was the lead vocalist and songwriter of Grandmaster Flash and the Furious Five.

== Career ==
Glover began performing in the late 1970s. He may have been the first rapper to call himself MC (master of ceremonies). Other Furious Five members included his brother Kidd Creole (Nathaniel Glover), Scorpio (Eddie Morris), Rahiem (Guy Todd Williams) and Cowboy (Keith Wiggins). While a member of the group, Cowboy created the term hip-hop while teasing a friend who had just joined the US Army, by scat singing the words "hip/hop/hip/hop" in a way that mimicked the rhythmic cadence of marching soldiers.

Grandmaster Flash and the Furious Five began recording for Enjoy Records and released "Superrappin'" in 1979. They later moved on to Sugar Hill Records and were popular on the R&B charts with party songs like "Freedom" and "The Birthday Party". They released numerous singles, gaining a gold disc for "Freedom", and touring. In 1982 Melle Mel began to turn to more socially-aware subject matter, in particular the Reagan administration's economic (Reaganomics) and drug policies, and their effect on the black community.

The song "The Message" became an instant classic and one of the first examples of conscious hip-hop by exploring personal and social themes. Mel recorded a rap over session musician Duke Bootee's instrumental track "The Jungle". Some of Mel's lyrics on "The Message" were taken directly from "Superrappin'". Other than Melle Mel, no members of Grandmaster Flash and the Furious Five actually appear on the record. Bootee also contributed vocals (Rahiem was to later lip sync Bootee's parts in the music video).

"The Message" would later be the first hip-hop record ever to be added to the United States National Archive of Historic Recordings and the first hip hop record inducted into the Grammy Hall of Fame. Mel would also go on to write songs about struggling life in New York City ("New York, New York"), and making it through life in general ("Survival (The Message 2)"). Grandmaster Flash split from the group after contract disputes between Melle Mel and their promoter Sylvia Robinson in regard to royalties for "The Message". When Flash filed a lawsuit against Sugar Hill Records, the factions of The Furious Five parted.

Mel became known as Grandmaster Melle Mel and the leader of the Furious Five. The group went on to produce the anti-drug song "White Lines (Don't Don't Do It)". An unofficial music video starred up-and-coming actor Laurence Fishburne and was directed by then-unknown film student Spike Lee. The record was falsely credited to "Grandmaster + Melle Mel" by Sugar Hill Records, in order to fool the public into thinking Grandmaster Flash had participated on the record.

Mel gained greater fame and success after appearing in the movie Beat Street, with a song based on the movie's title. He performed a memorable rap on Chaka Khan's smash hit song "I Feel for You", which introduced hip hop to a wider and more mainstream R&B audience. Grandmaster Melle Mel & The Furious Five had further hits with "Step Off", "Pump Me Up", "King of the Streets", "Jesse", and "Vice", the latter being released on the soundtrack to the TV show Miami Vice. "Jesse" was a highly political song which urged people to vote for then presidential candidate Jesse Jackson.

In 1988, after an almost four-year layoff, Mel and Flash reunited and released the album On The Strength, but with up-and-coming new school artists such as Eric B. & Rakim, DJ Jazzy Jeff & the Fresh Prince, Public Enemy, Boogie Down Productions, and Big Daddy Kane dominating the hip-hop market, the album failed miserably. Mel performed with The King Dream Chorus and Holiday Crew on "King Holiday" aimed at having Dr. Martin Luther King Jr.'s birthday declared a national holiday. Mel also performed with Artists United Against Apartheid on the anti-apartheid song "Sun City" which was aimed at discouraging other artists from performing in South Africa until its government ended its policy of apartheid. Mel ended the decade by winning two Grammy Awards for his work on Quincy Jones' Back on the Block and Q – The Autobiography of Quincy Jones albums.

In 1995, Duran Duran did a cover version of "White Lines" featuring performances from Grandmaster Flash and Melle Mel and released it as the second single from their cover album Thank You.

In 1996, Mel contributed vocals to the US edition of Cher's hit "One By One". Their version is only available on the maxi CD format.

In 1997, Melle Mel signed to Straight Game Records and released Right Now, an album which features Scorpio (from the Furious Five) and Rondo. This album took more of a harder rap style. It barely sold at all in the US and the UK.

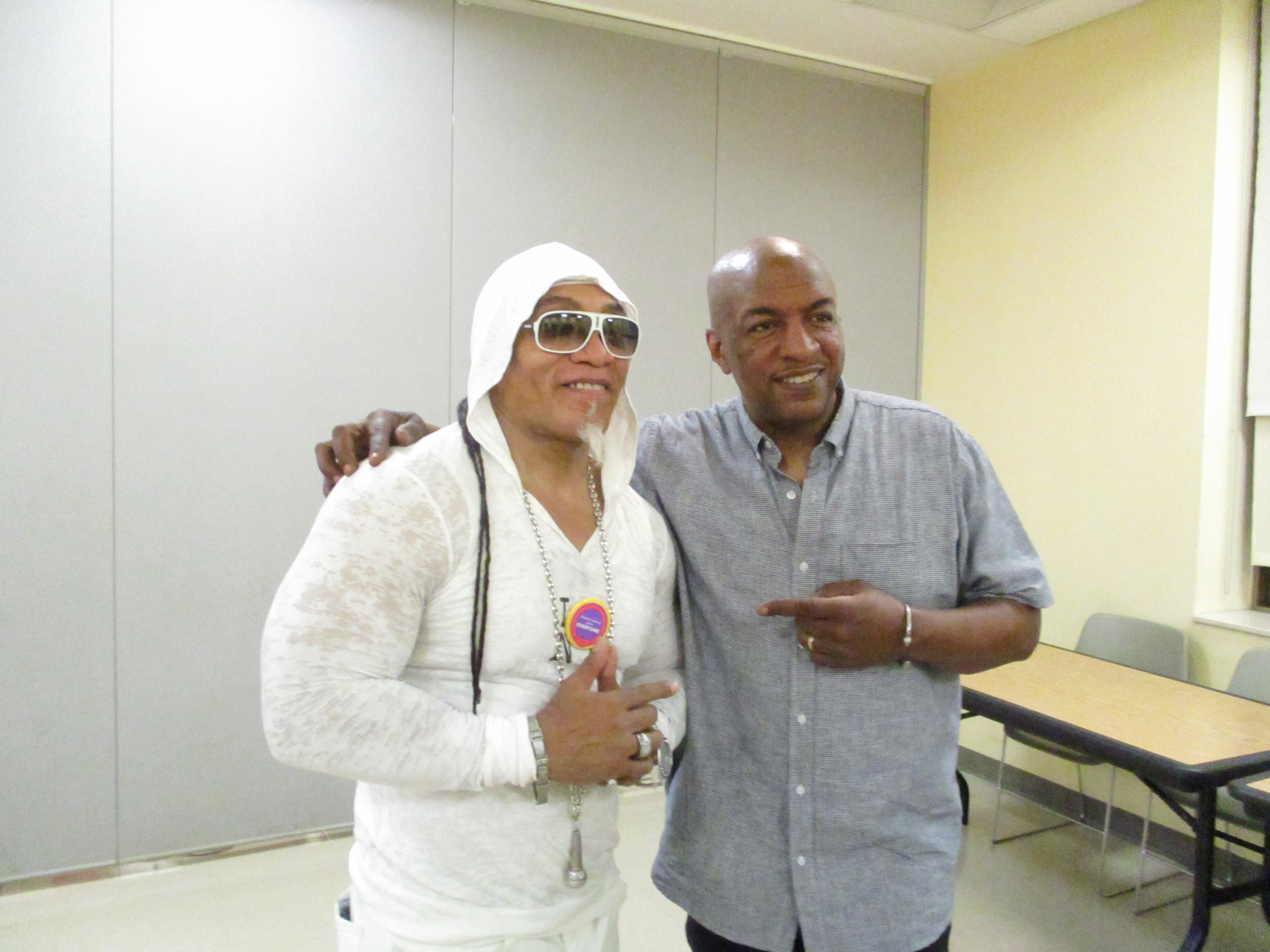
Mel and Ralph McDaniels a.k.a. Uncle Ralph

In 2001, under the name Die Hard, he released the song "On Lock" with Rondo on the soundtrack of the movie Blazin. Die Hard released an album of the same name in 2002 on 7PRecords.

On November 14, 2006, Mel collaborated with author Cricket Casey and released the children's book The Portal in the Park, which comes with a bonus CD of his rapped narration. It also features two songs, "World Family Tree" and "The Fountain of Truth", by a then unknown Lady Gaga performing with Mel. The book was re-released in 2010. Also in 2006, Melle Mel attended professional wrestling school. In 2007 (at age 45), he stated in an interview with allhiphop.com that "I'm going to try to take some of John Cena's money and get with WWE and do my thing".

On January 30, 2007, Mel released his first ever solo album, Muscles. The first single and music video was "M3 – The New Message". On March 12, 2007, Melle Mel and The Furious Five (joined by DJ Grandmaster Flash) became the first rap group ever inducted into the Rock and Roll Hall of Fame. In his acceptance speech, Mel implored the recording industry members in attendance to do more to restore hip hop to the culture of music and art that it once was, rather than the culture of violence that it has become. He added, "I've never been shot, I've never been arrested, and I've been doing hip hop all my life. I can't change things all by myself. We need everybody's help, so let's do it and get this thing done."

On October 10, 2008, Mel appeared on Bronx-based culinary adventure show Bronx Flavor alongside host Baron Ambrosia. In the episode "Night at the Bodega", he appears as a spiritual mentor to sway the Baron from his over-indulgent ways and get him on the right path to success.

In April 2011, it was revealed that he would take part in a new hip hop/pro wrestling collaboration, the Urban Wrestling Federation. Its first bout "First Blood" was recorded in June 2011.

Mel also appeared in Ice-T's 2012 hip hop documentary Something from Nothing: The Art of Rap.

In August 2015, Mel appeared with Kool Moe Dee and Grandmaster Caz in Macklemore and Ryan Lewis's song and music video "Downtown".

In May 2016, Mel and Scorpio, performing as Grandmaster's Furious Five ft. Melle Mel & Scorpio, released their single "Some Kind of Sorry".

In 2025, Mel and Scorpio toured with the Sugar Hill Gang.

In August 2025, Melle Mel and Scorpio announced they are producing a screenplay titled "The Message," which will detail their personal journeys and the rise of Grandmaster Flash and the Furious Five. The film is being produced through their company, Furious 5 Entertainment, with a targeted 2026 release.

Melle Mel's 2026 tour schedule includes a headlining performance at the Soultown festival in the United Kingdom in September 2026.

== Discography ==
=== Studio albums ===
List of albums
Title	Album details
Muscles (as Grandmaster Mele Mel)	Released: January 23, 2007; Label: Big Gunz; Formats: CD, digital download, streaming

=== Group albums ===
List of group albums, with selected chart positions
Title	Album details	Peak chart positions				
Title	Album details	US	US R&B /HH	AUS	NZ	UK
The Message (as part of Grandmaster Flash and the Furious Five)	Released: October 3, 1982; Label: Sugar Hill; Formats: CD, LP, cassette, digital download, streaming	53	8	78	14	77
On the Strength (as part of Grandmaster Flash and the Furious Five)	Released: April 12, 1988; Label: Elektra; Formats: CD, LP, cassette, digital download, streaming	189	—	—	—	—
On Lock (as part of Die Hard)	Released: December 4, 2001; Label: 7P/Crucial; Formats: CD, digital download, streaming	—	—	—	—	—
"—" denotes a recording that did not chart or was not released in that territory.

=== Collaborative albums ===
List of collaborative albums, with selected chart positions.
Title	Album details	Peak chart positions	
Title	Album details	US R&B /HH	UK
Grandmaster Melle Mel and the Furious Five (with the Furious Five)	Released: 1984; Label: Sugar Hill; Formats: CD, LP, cassette, streaming	43	45
Piano (with the Furious Five)	Released: 1989; Label: New Day; Formats: LP, cassette	—	—
Right Now (with Scorpio)	Released: April 8, 1997; Label: Str8 Game; Formats: CD, cassette, digital download	—	—
Portal in the Park (with Cricket Casey)	Released: November 14, 2006; Label: Black Solaris; Formats: CD	—	—
"—" denotes a recording that did not chart or was not released in that territory.

=== Compilations ===
Year	Title	Chart positions			
Year	Title	US 200	US R&B	CAN	UK
1983	Grandmaster Flash & the Furious Five: Released: 1983; Label: Sugar Hill Records	—	—	—	—
1984	Greatest Messages: Released: 1984; Label: Sugar Hill Records	—	—	—	41
1993	The Greatest Hits: Released: 2006; Label: Sequel (UK)	—	—	—	—
1994	Message from Beat Street: The Best of Grandmaster Flash, Melle Mel & the Furious Five: Released: April 19, 1994; Label: Rhino Records	—	—	—	—
1996	The Adventures of Grandmaster Flash, Melle Mel & the Furious Five: More of the Best: Released: July 1, 1996; Label: Rhino Records	—	—	—	—
1997	The Greatest Mixes: Released: 1997; Label: Sanctuary	—	—	—	—
1999	Adventures on the Wheels of Steel: Released: 1999; Label: Castle Music	—	—	—	—
1999	The Showdown: The Sugarhill Gang Vs. Grandmaster Flash & The Furious Five: Released: February 2, 1999; Label: Rhino Records / Warner-Elektra-Atlantic	—	—	—	—
2005	Essential Cuts: Released: June 27, 2005; Label: Union Square Music	—	—	—	—
2006	Grandmaster Flash, Melle Mel and the Furious Five: The Definitive Groove Collection: Released: August 8, 2006; Label: Rhino Records	—	—	—	—
2007	The Essential: Released: February 12, 2007; Label: Union Square Music	—	—	—	—
2010	Kings of the Streets: Released: 2010; Label: Sanctuary / Universal	—	—	—	—
"—" denotes releases that did not chart or were not released in that territory.

=== Singles ===
- 1979 "We Rap More Mellow" (as The Younger Generation)
- 1979 "Flash to the Beat" (as Flash and the Furious 5)
- 1979 "Superrappin'" (as Grandmaster Flash and the Furious Five)
- 1980 "Freedom" (as Grandmaster Flash and the Furious Five)
- 1980 "The Birthday Party" (as Grandmaster Flash and the Furious Five)
- 1981 "Showdown" (as The Furious Five Meets The Sugarhill Gang)
- 1981 "It's Nasty (Genius of Love)" (as Grandmaster Flash and the Furious Five)
- 1981 "Scorpio" (as Grandmaster Flash and the Furious Five)
- 1981 "The Adventures of Grandmaster Flash on the Wheels of Steel" (as Grandmaster Flash and the Furious Five)
- 1982 "The Message" (as Grandmaster Flash and the Furious Five)
- 1982 "Message II (Survival)" (as Melle Mel & Duke Bootee)
- 1983 "New York New York" (as Grandmaster Flash and the Furious Five)
- 1983 "White Lines (Don't Don't Do It)" (as Grandmaster & Melle Mel / Grandmaster Flash and the Furious Five / Grandmaster Flash and Melle Mel)
- 1984 "Continuous White Lines" (remix – as Grandmaster Melle Mel and the Furious Five)
- 1984 "Jesse" (as Grandmaster Melle Mel)
- 1984 "Beat Street Breakdown" a.k.a. "Beat Street" (as Grandmaster Melle Mel and the Furious Five)
- 1984 "Step Off" (as Grandmaster Melle Mel and the Furious Five)
- 1984 "We Don't Work for Free" (as Grandmaster Melle Mel and the Furious Five)
- 1984 "World War III" (as Grandmaster Melle Mel and the Furious Five / Grandmaster Melle Mel)
- 1985 "King Of the Streets" (as Grandmaster Melle Mel)
- 1985 "Pump Me Up" (as Grandmaster Melle Mel and the Furious Five)
- 1985 "Vice" (as Grandmaster Melle Mel)
- 1985 "The Mega-Melle Mix" (as Melle Mel)
- 1988 "Gold" (as Grandmaster Flash and the Furious Five)
- 1988 "Magic Carpet Ride" (as Grandmaster Flash and the Furious Five)
- 1994 "Sun Don't Shine in the Hood" (Split 12" single with "Da Original" as The Furious Five)
- 1995 "The Message 95" (Remix – as Grandmaster Flash and the Furious Five)
- 1997 "The Message" (Remix – as Grandmaster Flash and the Furious Five)
- 1997 "Mama" (as Grandmaster Mele-Mel & Scorpio)
- 1997 "Mr. Big Stuff" (as Grandmaster Mele-Mel & Scorpio)
- 2003 "Where Ya At?" (as Melle Mel)
- 2007 "M-3" (as Grandmaster Mele Mel)
- 2011 "Markus Schulz Presents Dakota feat. Grandmaster Mele Mel & Scorpio" – Sleepwalkers
- 2014 "Don't Shoot" (as Grandmaster Melle Mel)
- 2016 "Some Kind of Sorry" (as Grandmaster's Furious Five Ft. Mele Mel & Scorpio)

=== Collaborations ===
- 1984 "I Feel for You" by Chaka Khan
- 1986 "MC Story" by MC Chill and Emanon (The Baby Beatbox)
- 1986 "Susie" by Emanon
- 1986/87 "Who Do You Think You're Funkin' With" – collaborating with Afrika Bambaataa
- 1988 "R U Tuff Enuff" remix by Rebbie Jackson
- 1989 "What's the Matter with Your World?" (with Van Silk)
- 1995 "White Lines (Don't Do It)" by Duran Duran
- 1996 "What Order" (with Keith LeBlanc)
- 2005 "RSVP" (with Nikkole)
- 2008 "Hip Hop Fantasy" by Chutzpah – for the track "Bizness"
- 2009 "Electro Soul Satisfaction" – collaborating with Mic Murphy of the System
- 2010 "The Movies (2010) [feat. Melle Mel]" by Young Jimmy
- 2015 "Vamp Bikers" with Grandmaster Melle Mel, Caz Grand Puba and Grand Wizard Theodore Directed by Eric Spade Rivas

== Awards and nominations ==
Year	Nominee / work	Award	Result	Ref.
1990	"Back on the Block"	Grammy Award for Best Rap Performance by a Duo or Group	Won	
1996	"Stomp"	Grammy Award for Best R&B Performance by a Duo or Group with Vocals	Nominated	

On September 13, 2025, Melle Mel was one of the primary honorees at the inaugural Hip-Hop Ambassadors Honors and Awards Ceremony held in the Bronx, receiving a Medal of Honor for his role as an architect of the culture.
