= Grandmaster Flash =

American DJ (born 1957)

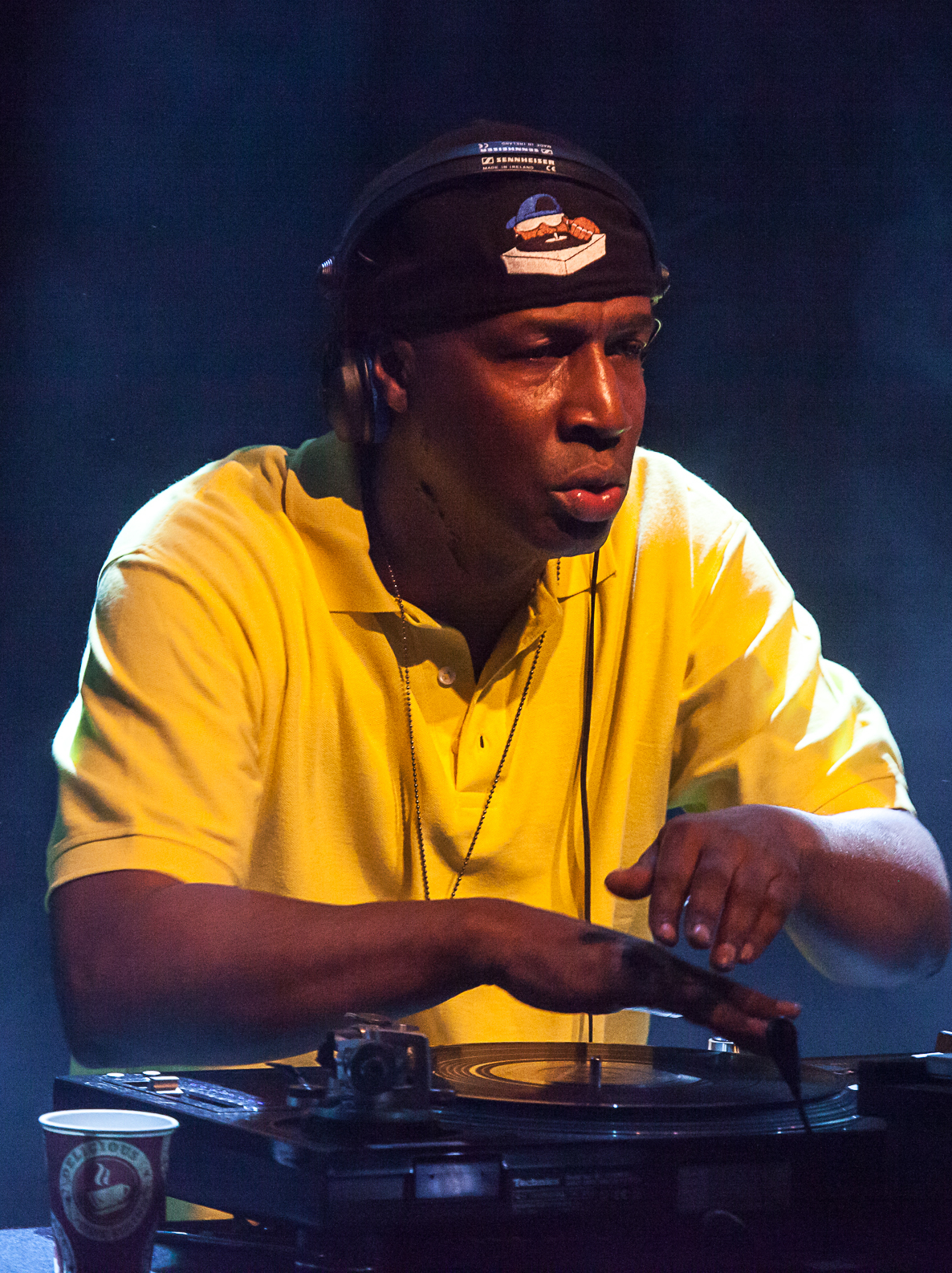
- Grandmaster Flash performing in 2014

Background information
- Born: Joseph Robert Saddler; January 1, 1958 (age 68); New York City, U.S.
- Origin: The Bronx, New York City, U.S.
- Genres: Old-school hip-hop; funk; electro
- Occupations: Disc jockey; record producer
- Years active: 1978–present
- Labels: Sugar Hill; Enjoy; Elektra
- Formerly of: Grandmaster Flash and the Furious Five
- Spouses: Brittany Williams (m. 1999; died 2015) Brittany Silver (m. 2018; div. 2021)
- Website: grandmasterflash.com

Joseph Robert Saddler (born January 1, 1958), known by his stage name Grandmaster Flash, is an American DJ. He is the creator of a DJ technique called the Quick Mix Theory, which elongates a song's drum breaks through the use of switching and looping duplicate vinyl copies. This technique gave rappers and breakdancers an elongated bed of beats to speak over or dance to, respectively, and gave birth to record cutting and scratching. He also invented the slipmat, used on a turntable platter rather than the traditional rubber mat for easier record manipulation.

He is the founder and creator of Grandmaster Flash and the Furious Five, the first rap group to be inducted into the Rock and Roll Hall of Fame in 2007. In 2019 he became the first hip hop artist to be honoured with the Polar Music Prize. On May 21, 2022, he acquired an honorary doctorate in Fine Arts from Buffalo State University. On June 1, 2023, he was awarded an honorary doctorate in music from Lehman College in the Bronx, NY. On August 4, 2023, Saddler was issued a proclamation from the city of New York stating that August 4 is Grandmaster Flash Day.

== Early life, family, and education ==
Saddler was born and raised in the Bronx, New York City. His father, Joseph Saddler Sr., was a track worker for the New York City Transit and his mother, Regina Saddler, was a stay-at-home seamstress.

He attended Samuel Gompers High School, a public vocational school. There, he learned how to repair electronic equipment. Saddler's parents played an important role in his interest in music. His father was a fan of Caribbean and African American recordings.

During his childhood, Saddler was fascinated by his father's record collection. In an interview, he reflected: "My father was a very heavy record collector.... I used to open his closets and just watch all the records he had. I used to get into trouble for touching his records, but I'd go right back and bother them." Saddler's early interest in DJing came from this fascination with his father's record collection as well as his mother's desire for him to educate himself in electronics. After high school, he became involved in the earliest New York DJ scene, attending parties set up by early luminaries like DJ Kool Herc and Disco King Mario.

Saddler's uncle Sandy Saddler was a featherweight boxing champion.

== Innovations ==
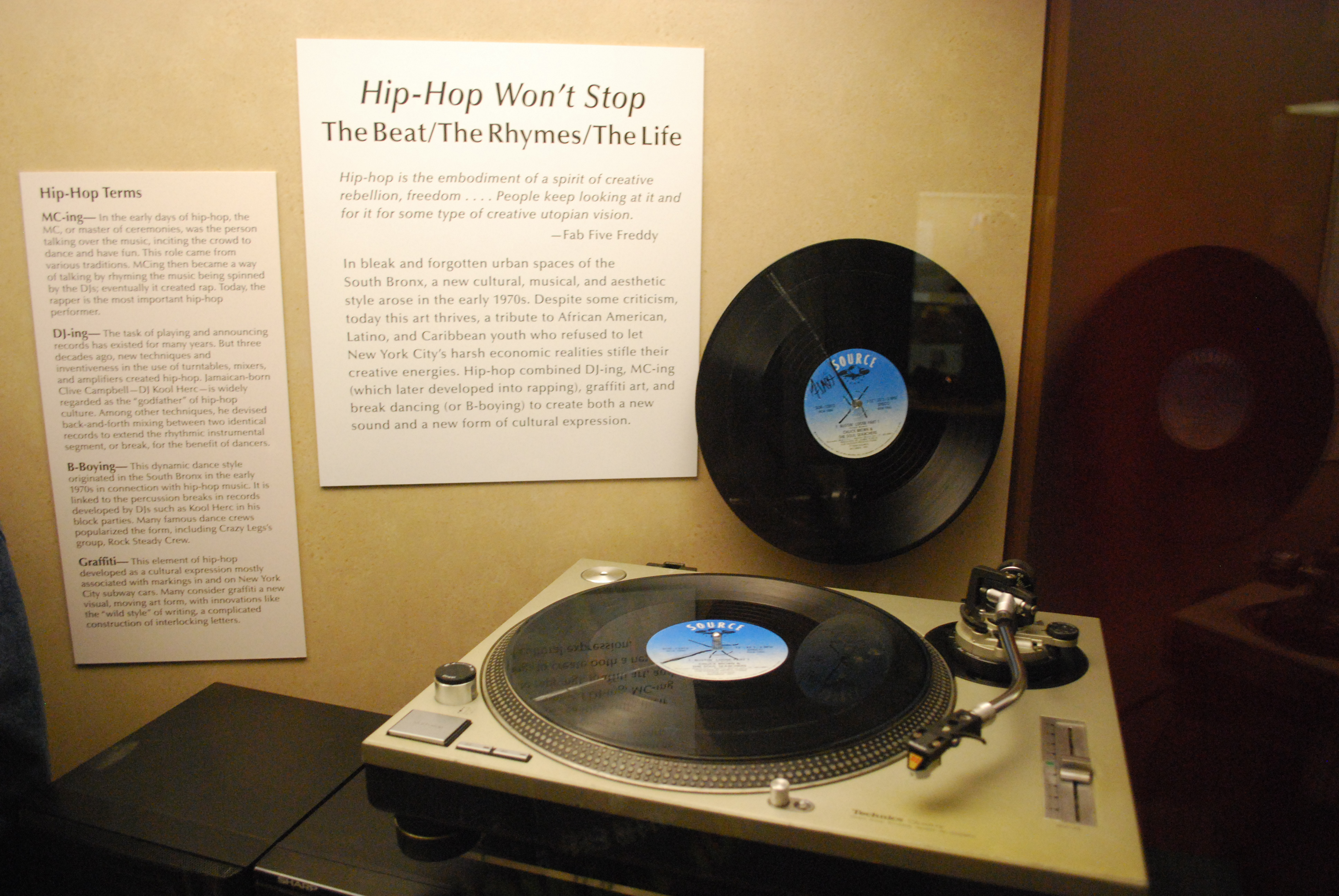
A Technics SL-1200MK2 turntable formerly belonging to Grandmaster Flash is exhibited as a symbol for hip-hop culture in the National Museum of American History.

When observing the differences between the smooth transitions of a disco DJ and the poorly-beat-matched transitions of early DJing, Grandmaster Flash took inspiration from the former to form a fingertip-to-vinyl and crossfader technique called the Quick Mix Theory. This technique was a mathematical way to cut, paste, repeat, and extend a very minuscule piece of an existing composition. This innovation took place in two places in the Bronx. The first location was his parents' house, 2730 Dewey Ave in the Throggs Neck Projects of the Bronx. The completion of the Quick Mix Theory was done at 927 Fox Street in the Hunts Point Area of the Bronx.

The Quick Mix Theory gave birth to techniques such as cutting, scratching, and transforming.

- Backspin technique (or quick-mix theory): Early New York party DJs came to understand that short drum breaks were popular with party audiences. Kool Herc began experimenting with the use of two identical tracks to extend the ‘break’, or instrumental section, resulting in what was known as ‘break-beat’. Grandmaster Flash perfected this technique where he could play the break on one record while searching for the same fragment of music on the other with the aid of his headphones. When the break finished on one turntable, he used his mixer to switch quickly to the other turntable, where the same beat was cued up and ready to play. Using the backspin technique (also referred to as beat juggling), the same short phrase of music could be looped indefinitely.

In addition to Grandmaster Flash's on-time BPM-perfected technique, additional items were needed to pull this off. These items were felt and wax paper. The combination of these two materials cut into the size of a record and placed on the turntable (at that time referred to as a "wafer") allowed the record to move fluidly. The end result of that was the creation of what we today call the slipmat. Another item that played a key role in the successful implementation of the quick mix theory is the needle/stylus.

He realized that the stylus came in two classes: elliptical, which sounded better but would not stay in the groove, and spherical. The spherical needle, although making the song sound worse, would stay inside the groove. This, in turn, allowed Flash to turn the vinyl counterclockwise to re-arrive at the top of the break.

- Punch phrasing (or clock theory): This technique involved isolating very short segments of music, typically horn hits, and rhythmically punching them over the sustained beat using the mixer.
- Scratching: Although the invention of record scratching as a form of adding to the musical entertainment is generally credited to Grand Wizzard Theodore, Grandmaster Flash perfected the technique and brought it to new audiences. Scratching, along with punch phrasing, exhibited a unique aspect of party DJing: instead of passively spinning records, he manipulated them to create new music.

== Grandmaster Flash and the Furious Five ==
=== 1970s ===
Grandmaster Flash played parties and collaborated with rappers such as Kurtis Blow and Lovebug Starski. In the late 1970s, he formed his own group. The original lineup consisted of Cowboy (Keef Cowboy), Melle Mel (Melvin Glover), and Kidd Creole (Nathaniel Glover), and the ensemble went by the name "Grandmaster Flash & the 3 MCs". Cowboy created the term hip hop. He created the term while teasing a friend who had just joined the U.S. Army, by scat singing the words "hip/hop/hip/hop" in a way that mimicked the rhythmic cadence of soldiers marching. Cowboy later worked the "hip hop" cadence into a part of his stage performance.

Mel was the first rapper to call himself "MC" (Master of Ceremony). Two other rappers briefly joined, but they were replaced more permanently by Rahiem (Guy Todd Williams, previously in the Funky Four) and Scorpio (Eddie Morris, a.k.a. Mr. Ness) to make Grandmaster Flash and the Furious Five. Quickly gaining recognition for their skillful raps, Grandmaster Flash and the Furious Five pioneered MCing and freestyle battles. Some of the staple phrases in MCing have their origins in the early shows and recordings of the group. A 1977 documentary film, Simpson Street, includes a hip-hop party on the roof of Casita Maria in the Bronx, with Grandmaster Flash in attendance; this is the earliest known footage of the hip-hop scene. In 1978, the new group began performing regularly at Disco Fever in the Bronx, one of the first times a hip-hop group was given a weekly gig at a well-known venue.

Grandmaster Flash and the Furious Five were signed to Bobby Robinson's Enjoy Records and in 1979 released their first single, "Superrappin'".

=== 1980s ===
In 1980 they signed to Sugar Hill Records and began touring and releasing numerous singles. The seminal "The Adventures of Grandmaster Flash on the Wheels of Steel", released in 1981, is a 7-minute solo showcase of Grandmaster Flash's virtuosic turntable skills, combining elements of Blondie's "Rapture", Michael Viner's Incredible Bongo Band's "Apache", Queen's "Another One Bites the Dust", Chic's "Good Times", and the group's own "Freedom". It is also the first documented appearance of scratching on a record. That year, the group opened for The Clash and were poorly received by an audience unaccustomed to the new style. The group's most significant hit was the electro rap song "The Message" (1982), which was produced by in-house Sugar Hill producer Clifton "Jiggs" Chase and featured session musician Duke Bootee. Unlike earlier rap tunes, "The Message" featured a grim narrative about inner city violence, drugs, and poverty. In 2002, it was one of 50 recordings chosen by the Library of Congress to be added to the National Recording Registry, the first hip hop recording to receive this honor. Critics praised the song's social awareness, calling the chorus "a slow chant seething with desperation and fury."

Other than Melle Mel, no members of the group actually appear in the song. Rahiem lip-synced Duke Bootee's vocal in the music video. The same year, Grandmaster Flash appeared in the movie "Wild Style" and sued Sugar Hill over the non-payment of royalties. Tensions mounted as "The Message" gained in popularity, eventually leading to a rupture between Melle Mel and Grandmaster Flash. Soon the group disintegrated entirely. Grandmaster Flash, Kidd Creole, and Rahiem left Sugar Hill, signed with Elektra Records, and continued on as simply "Grandmaster Flash", while Melle Mel and the others continued on as "Grandmaster Melle Mel & the Furious Five".

Grandmaster Flash was also interviewed in the 1986 cult documentary Big Fun in the Big Town.

Although frequently credited on the records, Grandmaster Flash does not actually appear on "The Message", "Freedom", or many of the other Furious Five songs. Although Grandmaster Flash provided the central element of the group's sound when performing live (in addition to giving the group its name), there was little room for his turntablism in early singles driven by the grooves of live session musicians. Grandmaster Flash and the Furious Five reformed in 1987 for a charity concert, and in 1988 they released a new album. The group reunited again in 1994, although Cowboy died in 1989.

=== 1990s ===
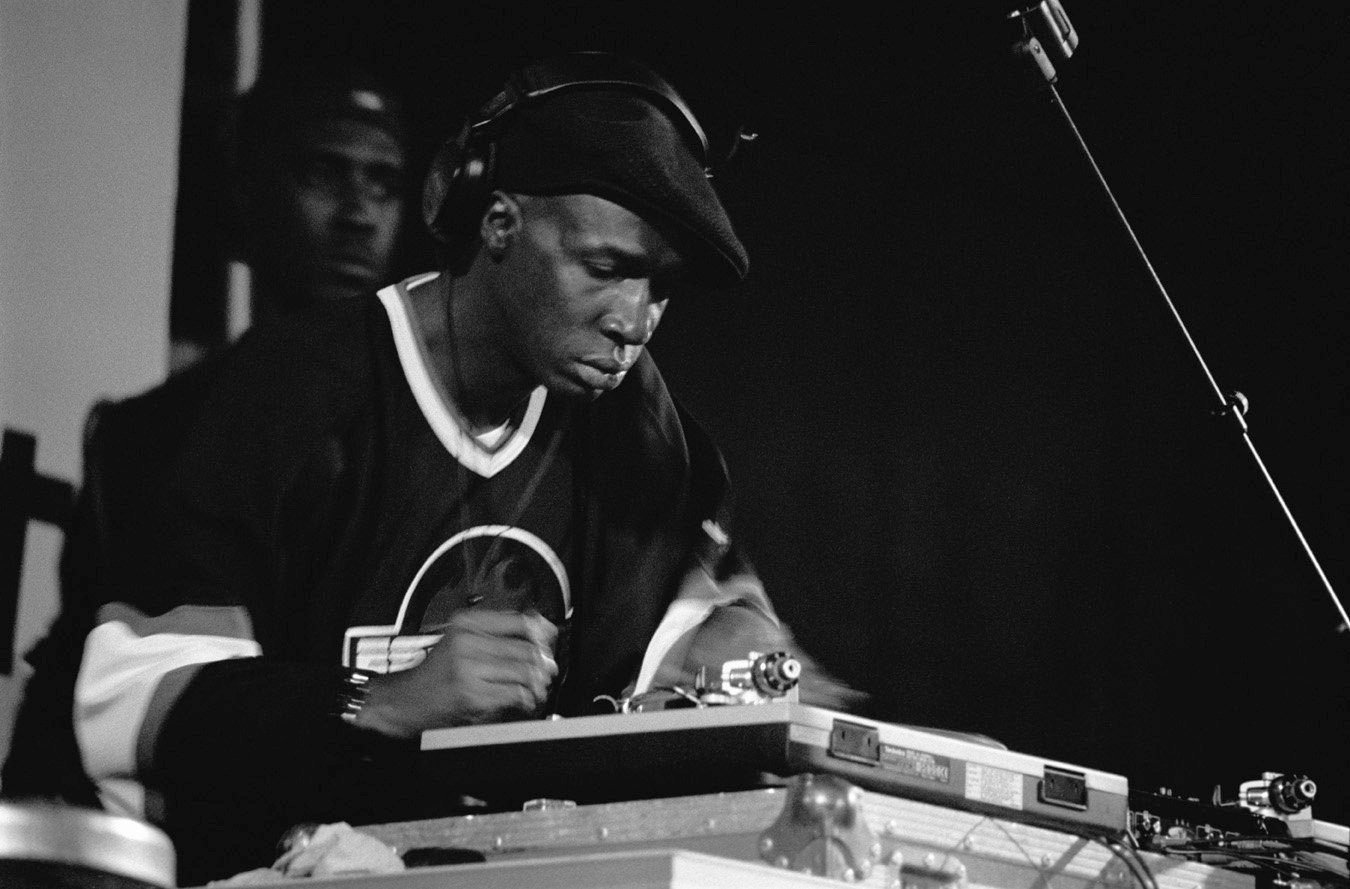
Grandmaster Flash performing in 1999

In 1999, Grandmaster Flash recorded with DJ Tomekk and Flavor Flav the single "1, 2, 3, ... Rhymes Galore". The single stayed for 17 weeks in the TOP ten of the German charts.

=== 2000 and beyond ===
In 2008, he released a memoir, The Adventures of Grandmaster Flash: My Life, My Beats, in which he talks about the origins of his fascination with scratching records and creating new beats. From a young age, Flash talks about how he would sneak into his father's record room to watch the record player spin, and then get punished for touching the records. He found inspiration even from things not associated with music. The spokes of his bicycle caused an interest in how record players create music just by rotating a grooved disc. Flash continued to experiment by taking apart any machine he could get his hands on to figure out how it worked. His early work shows the innovative ways in which his artistic abilities led to what is considered the first evolution of hip hop culture.

He hosted a weekly show on Sirius Satellite Radio (Friday Night Fire with Grandmaster Flash) and was presented with the BET "I Am Hip Hop Icon" award in 2006.

Grandmaster Flash and the Furious Five were the first hip-hop/rap group inducted into the Rock & Roll Hall of Fame on March 12, 2007, by Jay-Z. In 2008, he remixed the single "Into the Galaxy" by the Australian group, Midnight Juggernauts.

It has been said that "his pioneering mixing skills transformed the turntable into a true 'instrument', and his ability to get a crowd moving has made his DJ sets legendary."

Grandmaster Flash appears in the video game DJ Hero as a playable character along with original mixes created for the game.

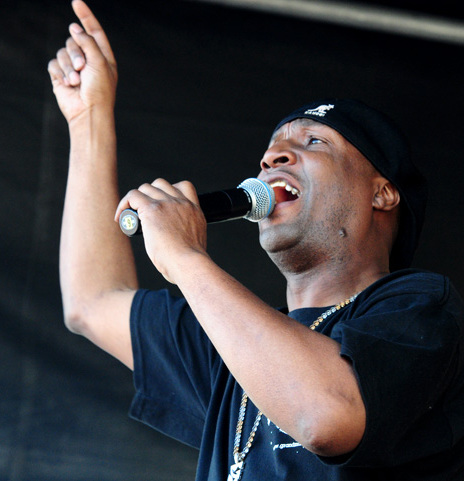
Grandmaster Flash in 2009

In December 2011, Grandmaster Flash was reported to be at work on his 12th album.

Aired in 2016, the Netflix original series The Get Down features a version of Grandmaster Flash that is played by Mamoudou Athie. The series takes place in 1977 New York City and follows the genesis of the DJing, B-boying, graffiti, and emceeing, the four element cultures of hip-hop. After the premiere of The Get Down, Netflix premiered Hip-Hop Evolution, a music documentary discussing the history of hip hop in which Grandmaster Flash talks about the evolution of his art.

In 2023, Grandmaster Flash competed in season nine of The Masked Singer as "Polar Bear". He was eliminated on "New York Night". As part of his encore, some DJ equipment was brought out so that Grandmaster Flash can scratch along to Chic's "Good Times".

Flash released a second memoir, Birth of a Culture, in 2026, with a focus on the origins of hip-hop and his role in it.

== Discography ==
=== Albums ===
Album information
The Message
- Released: 1982
- Last RIAA certification: Platinum
- Singles: "The Message", "It's Nasty"
Greatest Messages
- Released: 1984
- Last RIAA certification:
- Singles:
They Said It Couldn't Be Done
- Released: 1985
- Chart Positions: No. 35 Top R&B/Hip Hop
- Last RIAA certification: Gold
- Singles: "Girls Love the Way He Spins", "Sign of the Times", "Alternate Groove", "Larry's Dance Theme"
The Source
- Released: 1986
- Chart positions: No. 145 US, No. 27 Top R&B/Hip-Hop Albums,
- Last RIAA certification: Gold
- Singles: "Style (Peter Gunn Theme)", "Behind Closed Doors"
Ba-Dop-Boom-Bang
- Released: 1987
- Chart positions: No. 197 US, No. 43 Top R&B/Hip-Hop Albums
- Last RIAA certification: Gold
- Singles: "U Know What Time It Is", "All Wrapped Up"
On the Strength
- Released: 1988
- Chart positions: No. 189 US
- Last RIAA certification: Gold
- Singles: "Gold", "Magic Carpet Ride"
Salsoul Jam 2000
- Released: 1997
- Chart positions: did not chart
- Last RIAA certification:
- Singles: "Spring Rain"
Flash Is Back
- Released: 1998
- Chart Positions: did not chart
- Last RIAA certification:
- Singles:
The Official Adventures of Grandmaster Flash
- Released: January 29, 2002
- Chart positions: did not chart
- Last RIAA certification:
- Singles:
Essential Mix: Classic Edition
- Released: May 7, 2002
- Chart positions: did not chart
- Last RIAA certification:
- Singles:
The Bridge (Concept of a Culture)
- Released: February 24, 2009
- Chart positions:
- U.S. Sales: 2,607
- Last RIAA certification:
- Singles: Swagger feat. Red Cafe, Snoop Dogg & Lynn Carter
- Singles: Shine All Day feat. Q-Tip, Jumz & Kel Spencer

=== Singles ===
- 1979 – Superappin' (Enjoy 6001) Side A – Superappin'; Side B – Superappin' Theme
- 1980 – Freedom (Sugar Hill SH-549) Side A – vocal; Side B – instrumental
- 1981 – The Adventures of Grandmaster Flash on the Wheels of Steel (Sugar Hill SH-557)
- 1981 – Scorpio (Sugar Hill SH 118) Side A – vocal; Side B – instrumental
- 1982 – Flash To The Beat (Sugar Hill SH 574)
- 1984 – Jesse (Sugar Hill SH 133) Side A – vocal; Side B – instrumental
- 1984 – We Don't Work For Free (Sugar Hill SH 136) Side A – vocal; Side B – instrumental
- 1988 – Gold (edit) (Elektra EKR 70)
- 1996 – If U Wanna Party (feat. Carl Murray) (JAM 1002-8)

== Honors and awards ==
Grammys

- Lifetime Achievement Award
- Nominee Special Message

Global Spin Awards

- Lifetime Achievement Award

RIAA

- Hip-hop honoree award - RIAA Lifetime Achievement Award

Grammys

- 2012 Hall of Fame for Grandmaster Flash & The Furious Five single “The Message.”

Urban Music Awards

- 2009, Lifetime Achievement Award

Rock and Roll Hall of Fame

- 2007, Inductee

BET Hip Hop Awards

- 2006, I Am Hip Hop Icon Award

Polar Music Prize

- 2019, awarded Sweden's Polar Music Prize

Honorary Doctorates Degree

- 2022, Buffalo State University

== Filmography ==
Year	Title	Role	Notes
2001	Scratch	Himself	Archive footage; as Grand Master Flash
2017	The Get Down	Played by Mamoudoudou Athie	Fictional portrayal of The Grandmaster of Hip-Hop

== Books ==
- Grandmaster Flash; David Ritz (2008). The Adventures of Grandmaster Flash: My Life, My Beats. Broadway Books. ISBN 978-0-7679-2475-7.
- Grandmaster Flash; Jackson, Robert "Scoop" (September 22, 2026). Birth of a Culture (First hardcover ed.). New York: Amistad Press. ISBN 9780063467583. OCLC 1564982107.
