= The Source (Grandmaster Flash album) =

Studio album by Grandmaster Flash
- Released: March 2, 1986
- Genre: Hip-hop
- Length: 39:52
- Label: Elektra; 60476
- Producer: Grandmaster Flash, Vinnie Castellano

Grandmaster Flash chronology
They Said It Couldn't Be Done (1985)	The Source (1986)	Ba-Dop-Boom-Bang (1987)

The Source is the fourth studio album by Grandmaster Flash, released in 1986. It was reissued in the US on CD for the first time in 2005 (Collectors' Choice Music, CCM-583-2).

Professional ratings
Review scores
Source	Rating
Allmusic	2.5/5 stars
The Village Voice	C

== Track listing ==
1. "Street Scene" – 3:06
2. "Style (Peter Gunn Theme)" – 3:57
3. "Ms. Thang" – 3:55
4. "P.L.U. (Peace, Love and Unity)" – 3:57
5. "Throwin' Down" – 3:45
6. "Behind Closed Doors" – 3:39
7. "Larry's Dance Theme (Part 2)" – 3:31
8. "Lies" – 3:32
9. "Fastest Man Alive" – 5:22
10. "Freelance" – 5:08

== Personnel ==
- Grandmaster Flash (Joseph Saddler) – turntables
- The Kidd Creole (Nathaniel Glover jr) – Lead and background vocals, writer and arranger
- Rahiem (Guy Todd Williams) – Lead and background vocals, writer and arranger
- La Von (Kevin Lavon Dukes) – Lead and background vocals, writer and arranger, bass guitar
- Broadway (Russell Wheeler) – rap vocals
- Larry "Love" (Larry Parker) – Dancer
- Shame (Jesse Dukes) – Flash's assistant

== Musicians ==
- Chuck Kentis – synth
- Guy Williams, Joseph Saddler – drum programming
- Guy Vaughn – bass, synth, drum programming
- Allen Douches – engineer
- Barbara Baker, Vincent Castellano – executive producers
- Joseph Saddler, Vincent Castellano – producer

Recorded and mixed at Grand Slam Studio, West Orange, NJ.
