= Essential Mix: Classic Edition =

Compilation album (DJ mix) by Grandmaster Flash
- Released: May 7, 2002
- Genre: Rap
- Length: 56:12
- Label: Strut; R2-78239

Grandmaster Flash chronology
The Official Adventures Of Grandmaster Flash (2002)	Essential Mix: Classic Edition (2002)	Essential Cuts (2005)

Professional ratings
Review scores
Source	Rating
AllMusic	3/5 stars
HipHopDX.com	3.5/5 stars

Essential Mix: Classic Edition is an album released by Grandmaster Flash. It was released in 2002 and features Grandmaster Flash remixing classic club and dance tunes into a constant megamix.

== Track listing ==
1. "Intro" – Grandmaster Flash – 0:31
2. "I Can't Wait" – Nu Shooz – 1:59
3. "I Found Lovin'" – The Fatback Band – 4:45
4. "Before I Let Go" – Maze featuring Frankie Beverly – 4:27
5. "We Got the Funk" – Positive Force – 1:00
6. "Rapture" – Blondie – 2:56
7. "Last Night a DJ Saved My Life" – Indeep – 3:24
8. "Cavern" – Liquid Liquid – 2:45
9. "I'll Do Anything For You" – Denroy Morgan – 6:02
10. "Bra" – Cymande – 1:50
11. "Walking on Sunshine" – Rockers Revenge – 2:55
12. "Rock Your World" – Weeks & Co. – 3:17
13. "Love Is the Message" – MFSB featuring The Three Degrees – 1:42
14. "Give It Up Or Turnit A Loose" – James Brown – 4:57
15. "It's Just Begun" – Jimmy Castor Bunch – 2:34
16. "You're the One for Me" – D. Train – 4:03
17. "Planet Rock" – Afrika Bambaataa & Soul Sonic Force – 7:11
