= Ba-Dop-Boom-Bang =

Studio album by Grandmaster Flash
- Released: April 7, 1987
- Genre: Hip-hop
- Labels: Elektra; 60723
- Producers: Gordon Anderson; Brian "Chuck" New; Larry Smith

Grandmaster Flash chronology
The Source (1986)	Ba-Dop-Boom-Bang (1987)	On the Strength (1988)

Professional ratings
Review scores
Source	Rating
AllMusic	2/5 stars

Ba-Dop-Boom-Bang is the fifth album released by Grandmaster Flash. It was released in 1987 on Elektra records. The cassette version was titled Ba-Dop-Boom-Bang...And More and the CD version was titled Ba-Dop-Boom-Bang...And Even More – each containing bonus tracks that were not on the original vinyl.

European pressings of the album misprinted the title of the track "All Wrapped Up" as "All Rapped Up".

It was reissued in the US on CD in 2005 by Collectors' Choice Music. This release reverted to the original vinyl track listing and omitted any additional tracks. The booklet also removed the printed credits and lyrics and replaced them with a new essay by Peter Relic. It also repeated the artwork mistake made to the track listing that initially appeared on the European pressings of the original LP and made an additional one (*).

== Track listing ==
=== 1987 vinyl release – Elektra (60723-1) ===
Side 1

1. "Ain't We Funkin' Now" – 0:59
2. "U Know What Time it Is" – 3:23
3. "Underarms" – 3:09
4. "Kid Named Flash" – 3:58
5. "Get Yours" – 3:34
6. "Them Jeans" – 3:16
7. "We Will Rock You" – 2:46

Side 2

1. "All Wrapped Up" – 3:16
2. "Tear the Roof Off" – 2:29
3. "Big Black Caddy" – 4:03
4. "House that Rocked" – 4:00
5. "Bus Dis (Wooo)" – 3:07
6. "I am Somebody" – 3:34
7. "Ain't We Funkin' Now" – 1:20

=== 1987 CD release – Elektra (60723-2) ===
1. "Ain't We Funkin' Now" – 0:59
2. "U Know What Time it Is" – 3:23
3. "Underarms" – 3:09
4. "Kid Named Flash" – 3:58
5. "Get Yours" – 3:34
6. "Them Jeans" – 3:16
7. "We Will Rob You" – 2:46 (**)
8. "All Wrapped Up" – 3:16
9. "Tear the Roof Off" – 2:29
10. "Big Black Caddy" – 4:03
11. "House that Rocked" – 4:00
12. "Bus Dis (Wooo)" – 3:07
13. "I am Somebody" – 3:34
14. "U Know What Time It Is" (Extended Version) – 3:52
15. "Big Black Caddy" (Extended Version) – 4:54
16. "Ain't We Funkin' Now" (Extended Version) – 3:44
17. "All Wrapped Up" (Extended Version) – 5:06
18. "Kid Named Flash" (Extended Version) – 4:58

=== 1987 cassette release – Elektra (60723-4) ===
Side A

1. "Ain't We Funkin' Now"
2. "U Know What Time It Is"
3. "Underarms"
4. "Kid Named Flash"
5. "Get Yours"
6. "Them Jeans"
7. "We Will Rock You"
8. "She's Just A Tease / Ain't We Funkin' Now"

Side B

1. "All Wrapped Up"
2. "Tear The Roof Off"
3. "Big Black Caddy"
4. "House That Rocked"
5. "Bus Dis (Wooo)"
6. "I Am Somebody"
7. "Ain't We Funkin' Now / We Will Rob You"

=== 2005 CD reissue – Collectors' Choice Music (CCM-584-2) ===
1. "Ain't We Funkin' Now" – 0:59
2. "U Know What Time it Is" – 3:23
3. "Underarms" – 3:09
4. "Kid Named Flash" – 3:58
5. "Get Yours" – 3:34
6. "Them Jeans" – 3:16
7. "We Will Rob You" – 2:46 (**)
8. "All Wrapped Up" – 3:16
9. "Tear the Roof Off" – 2:29
10. "Big Black Caddy" – 4:03
11. "House that Rocked" – 4:00
12. "Bus Dis (Wooo)" – 3:07
13. "I am Somebody" – 3:34
14. "Ain't We Funkin' Now" – 1:20

== Notes ==
(*) The rear of the 2005 CD reissue again lists "All Wrapped Up" as "All Rapped Up" and additionally "Bus Dis (Wooo)" as "Bus Dis (Wood)."

(**) The original 1987 CD Ba-Dop-Boom-Bang...And Even More lists the track as We Will Rob You and the writer credits Brian May (from the sampled Queen track). The 2005 reissue incorrectly lists the track as We Will Rock You and the writer credit as J. Saddler [sic] (Grandmaster Flash) just like the original vinyl release. Both tracks are identical.

== Personnel ==
- Grandmaster Flash (Joseph Sadler) – keyboards, emulator on "All Wrapped Up"
- The Kidd Creole (Nathaniel Glover Jr.) – lead and background vocals, writer and arranger
- Rahiem (Guy Todd Williams) – lead and background vocals, writer and arranger
- La Von (Kevin L. Dukes) – lead and background vocals, writer and arranger
- Mr. Broadway (Russell Wheeler) – lead and background vocals
- Larry Love (Larry Parker) – dancer
- Shame (Jesse Dukes) – assistant to the Grandmaster
- Kev "The Dog" Harris – light tech
- Raymond "Sugar Ray" Holloway – assistant technician
- Guy Vaughn - keyboards, drum programming
- Larry Smith - keyboards, drum programming
- Tanna Gardner - vocals on "Underarms"
- Nikki Williams - vocals on "Big Black Caddy"
- Edith R. Simmons - vocals on "Underarms"

All arrangements by J. Sadler, L. Smith, G. Vaughn, N.Glover Jr, G. Williams and K. Dukes
