= On the Strength =

Studio album by Grandmaster Flash and the Furious Five
- Released: April 12, 1988
- Genre: Hip hop
- Length: 44:07
- Label: Elektra; 60769
- Producer: Grandmaster Flash and the Furious Five

Grandmaster Flash chronology
Ba-Dop-Boom-Bang (1987)	On the Strength (1988)	Greatest Hits (1993)

Melle Mel chronology
Grandmaster Melle Mel and the Furious Five (1984)	On the Strength (1988)	Piano (Grandmaster Melle Mel and the Furious Five) (1989)

Professional ratings
Review scores
Source	Rating
Allmusic	1/5 stars
The Village Voice	C+

On the Strength is the second and final studio album by Grandmaster Flash and the Furious Five. Released in 1988, it was the full line-up's last album together. Although contributing to the album itself, Cowboy (Keith Wiggins) was not present for the album or single photo shoots.

The album was reissued in the US on CD in 2005 (Collectors' Choice Music, CCM-585-2) but once again (see Ba-Dop-Boom-Bang) omitted the bonus track (*) that was originally included on both the original CD and cassette versions of the album.

== Track listing ==
1. "Gold" – 4:25
2. "Cold in Effect" – 2:28
3. "Yo Baby" – 4:31
4. "On the Strength" – 4:45
5. "The King" – 3:19
6. "Fly Girl" – 5:13
7. "Magic Carpet Ride" (featuring Steppenwolf) – 4:14
8. "Leave Here" – 3:50
9. "This Is Where You Got It From" – 4:06
10. "The Boy Is Dope" – 3:11
11. "Back in the Old Days of Hip-Hop" – 4:05 (*)

== Notes ==
- "Back in the Days of Hip-Hop" also appeared as the B-side of the UK and US Gold 7-inch single and the Magic Carpet Ride 12" single.

== Personnel ==
- Artist & Repertoire: Raoul Roach
- Grandmaster Flash (Joseph Sadler) – turntables, drum programming, Flashformer transform DJ device, background vocals
- The Kidd Creole (Nathaniel Glover Jr.) – Lead and background vocals, writer and arranger
- Keef Cowboy (Keith Wiggins) – Lead and background vocals, writer and arranger
- Grandmaster Melle Mel (Melvin Glover) – Lead and background vocals, writer and arranger
- Scorpio (Eddie Morris) – Lead and background vocals, writer and arranger
- Rahiem (Guy Todd Williams) – Lead and background vocals, writer and arranger
- Guy Vaughn – keyboards, drum programming, and vocals on The Boy Is Dope
- Afrika Bambaataa (Kevin Donovan) – music and drum-sound consultant
- Jesse Daniels Force MD's – vocals on Fly Girl
- Arthur "Disco B" Hayward – additional scratches and assistant to the Grandmaster
- Ray (Ray Roll) Cortez – vocals on The Boy Is Dope
