= The Adventures of Grandmaster Flash on the Wheels of Steel =

- Side A of the US 12-inch single

Single by Grandmaster Flash
- Released: 1981
- Genre: Hip hop; turntablism; dance; sound collage; megamix; mashup
- Length: 7:12
- Label: Sugar Hill Records
- Songwriters: Clifton "Jiggs" Chase, Melvin Glover, George Jackson, Sylvia Robinson
- Producers: Sylvia Robinson and Joey Robinson Jr.

"The Adventures of Grandmaster Flash on the Wheels of Steel" is a single released by American disc jockey Grandmaster Flash in 1981. It is a live DJ mix recording of Flash scratching and mixing records from various groups using three turntables. The musician employed several DJ techniques in the recording, including crossfading, cutting, rubbing and backspins.

On release, the single was a cult hit and reached number 55 on the Billboard R&B chart. It was also a major critical success, and was ranked at number two among the top ten "Tracks of the Year" for 1981 by NME. Proving crucial in the development of hip-hop, the track was highly influential on many DJs, including rapper Dr. Dre, and an early example of what would eventually be termed turntablism. It was also a pivotal release in the development of sampling, megamixes and mashups. Several critics have included it in their lists of the best or most important singles ever.

== Samples ==
Flash recorded "Wheels of Steel" live over three hours, during a four-day break from touring. It took the producer "two mixers and between 10 and 15 takes to get it right ... And whenever I'd mess up I would just refuse to punch. I would just go back to the beginning." Flash says of the track: "I did that live in the studio, but to get it locked took a day or two. Maybe I'd set the cue down too soon and have to stop and go back all over. Or I might cue in too late. Too late, too soon. If you listen to it, even down to the spaces where there's no music, where it pauses and then comes in, the timing is absolutely perfect."

Along with spoken word vocals from a 1966 album titled The Official Adventures of Flash Gordon, some of the primary records utilized to create the mix included:

- Chic – "Good Times"
- Blondie – "Rapture"
- Queen – "Another One Bites the Dust"
- Sugarhill Gang – "8th Wonder" note: Sugarhill Gang sampled "Daisy Lady" by 7th Wonder
- The Furious Five – "Birthday Party"
- Spoonie Gee – "Monster Jam"
- Michael Viner's Incredible Bongo Band – "Apache"
- Grandmaster Flash and the Furious Five – "Freedom"
- Sugarhill Gang – "Rapper's Delight"
- The Hellers – "Life Story"

The track makes novel use of record scratching; in addition to crossfading between songs, the record features "cutting (creating pauses or skipped riffs from previously recorded materials), rubbing (a lighter technique related to scratching), and Grandmaster Flash's signature backspins (which sound like sweeps)" Tom Cox of The Guardian wrote of the "groundbreaking turntable callisthenics" that, like much early Sugar Hill Records material, it grew from the "ductile roots" of Chic's "Good Times"

in his 2026 autobiography Birth of a Culture, Flash claims the track was completed in only three takes.

== Release and reception ==
Flash later said he did not believe the record was going to be accepted by Sugar Hill Records, saying: "I wouldn't even know how to ask a record label, 'Let me make a record with records'." However, label CEO Sylvia Robinson had seen Flash live; he said: "She'd seen that this turntable artistry caused a frenzy." On the record's release, he said: "I was scared. I didn’t think anyone was gonna get it. I thought, they might understand this. DJs'll probably love it." According to journalist Steven Harvey: "It takes a lot of willpower in a record company situation to do that, for [Flash] to dictate what he wanted to do. Most places, they’re going to go, 'Here's the track' and force you to do what they want." Released in 1981, "The Adventures of Grandmaster Flash at the Wheels of Steel" reached number 55 on the Billboard R&B chart; a chart position that has been considered impressive "for a recording that places turntablism in the foreground", although it did not outperform earlier Flash singles. However, the song was a major club hit both in the US and Europe. It was also a cult hit and received acclaim from music critics.

Among contemporary reviews, NME praised "Wheels of Steel" as an "impossible" and "important" record in their singles column. In an accompanying feature for the magazine, Richard Grabel wrote that Flash's unique and "extraordinary" quick mix technique on turntables, which had made him and the Furious Five "the undisputed champions of the Bronx", was "remarkably captured" on the record. He wrote: "It doesn't work like any ordinary dance record. It's a record to slip into a party tape and amaze the dancers, confound all expectations. It's weird, it's a surprise, with its stops and starts, its stringing together sections of different dance hits, its spin backs and crazy rumblings, all of which never miss a beat." The New York Times writer Robert Hilburn praised the single for being "[a] preposterous but also delightful left-field entry, blending a voice-over rap, catchy disco rhythms and studio shenanigans that'll convince you that your turntable has gone awry." Patrick Goldstein of the same publication noted that the song had been hailed as "rap music's first avant-garde masterpiece" but commented on the "understandable" hostility it received from some casual pop music fans when played at Tower Records in West Hollywood. He wrote: "Compared to the sunny, squeaky-clean rock popular today, rap is an aural dark alley, a seemingly anarchic collage of ghetto patois and jumbled rhythms that could easily disorient a consumer corn-fed on Styx and REO Speedwagon."

In lists of 1981's best singles, "Wheels of Steel" was ranked second by NME and ninth by The New York Times, who commented: "The year's best headphones single ... It's far too offbeat to turn up on pop radio, but it's worth exploring if you're in an adventurous mood." The track also finished third in the Pazz & Jop poll of the year's best singles. The poll's curator, Robert Christgau of The Village Voice, considered it to be "the skeptic's (and aesthete's) 12-inch, is a mix rather than a rap" and "an ur-novelty that struts rap's will to reclaim and redefine popular culture." In 1982, Paolo Hewitt of Melody Maker described the track as "one of the most inventive records of recent times." Reviewing Grandmaster Flash's 1984 compilation Greatest Messages, J.D. Considine of Record was critical of the exclusion of "Wheels of Steel", which he dubbed Flash's "turntable tour de force" and "the first scratch hit."

== Legacy ==
"The Adventures of Grandmaster Flash" proved highly influential in the development of hip-hop music, and according to The Guardian's Andrew Purcell, has "inspired generations of musicians". It was the first rap track to be produced with records and, resultingly, to employ scratching and turntablism. MusicRadar dubbed it "the first record to feature little more than two turntables and a mixer as instruments, stitching together segments from 10 different songs to create one piece of music." According to Angus Batey of Mojo, the track "turned received wisdom on how to make records on its head", deeming it to be "probably the only true approximation of what the original DJ-based hip hop parties sounded and felt like that was ever committed to tape." Similarly, author Todd Souviginier describes the "dazzling sound collage" as a major achievement and "arguably the first real display of modern DJ skills on vinyl", considering it to be a radical postmodern work that was without precedent in pop music for the way it re-purposed an assortment of records.

The record was a major influence on other DJs, with Flash playing a pivotal role in "establishing the concept of sampling and turntablism." In particular, the track sparked interest in turntablism as an art form and "inspired the next wave of turntablists." Souvignier wrote that the track placed the DJ "in the spotlight, as a performer and soloist, on par with any other musician". Martin Aston of Q also describes the track as "the catalyst" for DJs in the British underground, with turntablist Matt Black of Coldcut citing his discovery of Flash as a formative influence. The track was also influential in the development of the megamix. PopMatters writer Kyle Cochrun considers it "the most legendary megamix of all time", adding that as it was recorded live, Flash "essentially invented the megamix in real time. No happy accidents." The manner in which the record cuts and switches between different songs proved to be an influence on further studio-produced megamixes which utilised genuine samples, an example being the 1984 electro funk track "Tommy Boy Megamix", comprising snippets of the most popular songs on hip-hop label Tommy Boy Records.

In his piece on remixing, Kyle Adams cites "Wheels of Steel", alongside Double Dee and Steinski's "Lesson 1-The Payoff Mix" (1983), as "two seminal early remixes", while author Matt Mason wrote Flash and Afrika Bambaataa were historic in the development of the remix as the process 'mutated' on vinyl, describing Flash's record as "[showing] the world this new remix music undiluted." The record has also been described as a mashup, with Treble writer Adam Blyweiss including the track at the start of their 2014 list of "essential mashup milestones". David Dewaele of Soulwax was influenced by the record, have adopted the idea of "[taking] the best bits of the records [Flash] loves and repeats them so people can dance", for Soulwax's mashup side-project 2 Many DJs.

=== Retrospective appraisal ===
Among retrospective appraisals, AllMusic's Jason Ankeny described it as the Furious Five's "first truly landmark recording" and "a stunning sound collage", while Steven Daly of Vanity Fair has dubbed it "a dense and dazzling sound collage that has been described as the sole recorded embodiment of original hip-hop." Mark Dery of The New York Times considers it an "audio collage" that "stands alongside Jimi Hendrix's abstract-expressionist 'Star-Spangled Banner' as one of pop music's most dazzling moments." Cochrun calls it a "seven-minute display of finesse, close-listening, musical knowledge, and all-around turntable mastery". In a history of remixes for Treble, Jeff Terich described recording "the first iconic turntablism mix" as one of several Flash innovations, along with his backspin technique and punch phrasing; he deemed the piece to be "a full night's DJ mix compressed into seven minutes", seamless but "not scratch-free".

In 1987, NME ranked "Wheels of Steel" at number 31 in their list of the top 150 singles of all time. In 1992, The Wire included it in their list of "The 100 Most Important Records Ever Made"; the magazine wrote that in being the first scratch mix, the track remains "the entry point into a new, incredibly creative period of black music mixes", adding that it "laid down a formal gauntlet not taken up until Double Dee and Steinski's three 'Lessons' of 1984/5." In 2001, Uncut ranked it at number 18 in their list of "The 100 Greatest Singles from the Post-Punk Era".

== Track listing ==
=== Vinyl ===
A. "The Adventures of Grandmaster Flash on the Wheels of Steel"
B. "The Birthday Party" (instrumental)

=== CD ===
1. "The Adventures of Grandmaster Flash on the Wheels of Steel"
2. "The Message"
3. "It's Nasty (Genius of Love)"

== Chart positions ==
Chart (1981)	Peak position
U.S. Billboard R&B Singles	55
