= Grandmaster Flash and the Furious Five =

American hip hop group (1978–1988)

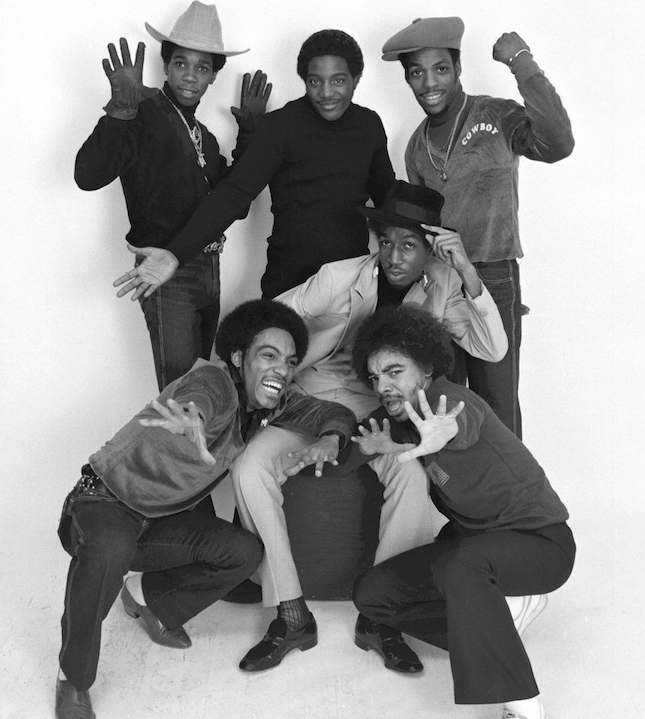
- Grandmaster Flash and the Furious Five in 1982 top: Scorpio, Rahiem and Cowboy bottom: Melle Mel, Grandmaster Flash and Kidd Creole

Background information
- Origin: The Bronx, New York City, U.S.
- Genres: Hip-hop; old school hip-hop; East Coast hip-hop
- Years active: 1978–1983; 1987–1988
- Labels: Sugar Hill; Elektra
- Past members: Grandmaster Flash; Kidd Creole; Keef Cowboy; Melle Mel; Scorpio; Rahiem
- Website: thefurious5.com

Grandmaster Flash and the Furious Five were an American hip-hop group formed in the South Bronx of New York City in 1978. The group's members were Grandmaster Flash, Kidd Creole (not to be confused with Kid Creole), Keef Cowboy, Melle Mel, Scorpio and Rahiem. The group's use of turntablism, breakbeat DJing and conscious lyricism were significant in the early development of hip hop music.

In the late 1970s, Grandmaster Flash and the Furious Five built their reputation and achieved local success by performing at parties and live shows. By 1980, the group had signed with Sugar Hill Records, but it was not until the release of the song "The Message" in 1982 and the album The Message that they achieved mainstream success. The song provided a political and social commentary and went on to become a driving force behind conscious hip-hop.

Grandmaster Flash and the Furious Five split into two separate groups in 1983 until a brief reunion in 1987 led to the release of the original line-up's second album On the Strength. Afterwards, they disbanded permanently. Today, the group's legacy continues as Grandmaster's Furious Five with only Melle Mel and Scorpio as remaining members.

Grandmaster Flash and the Furious Five were inducted into the Rock & Roll Hall of Fame in 2007, the first hip hop group to be inducted. They have been ranked as one of the greatest rap groups of all time by Billboard (2023). In 2002, "The Message" was one of the 50 inaugural recordings chosen by the Library of Congress to be added to the National Recording Registry. Rolling Stone ranked "The Message" number 59 on its list of the 500 Greatest Songs of All Time in 2021.

== History ==
=== Formation and early years (1978–1979) ===
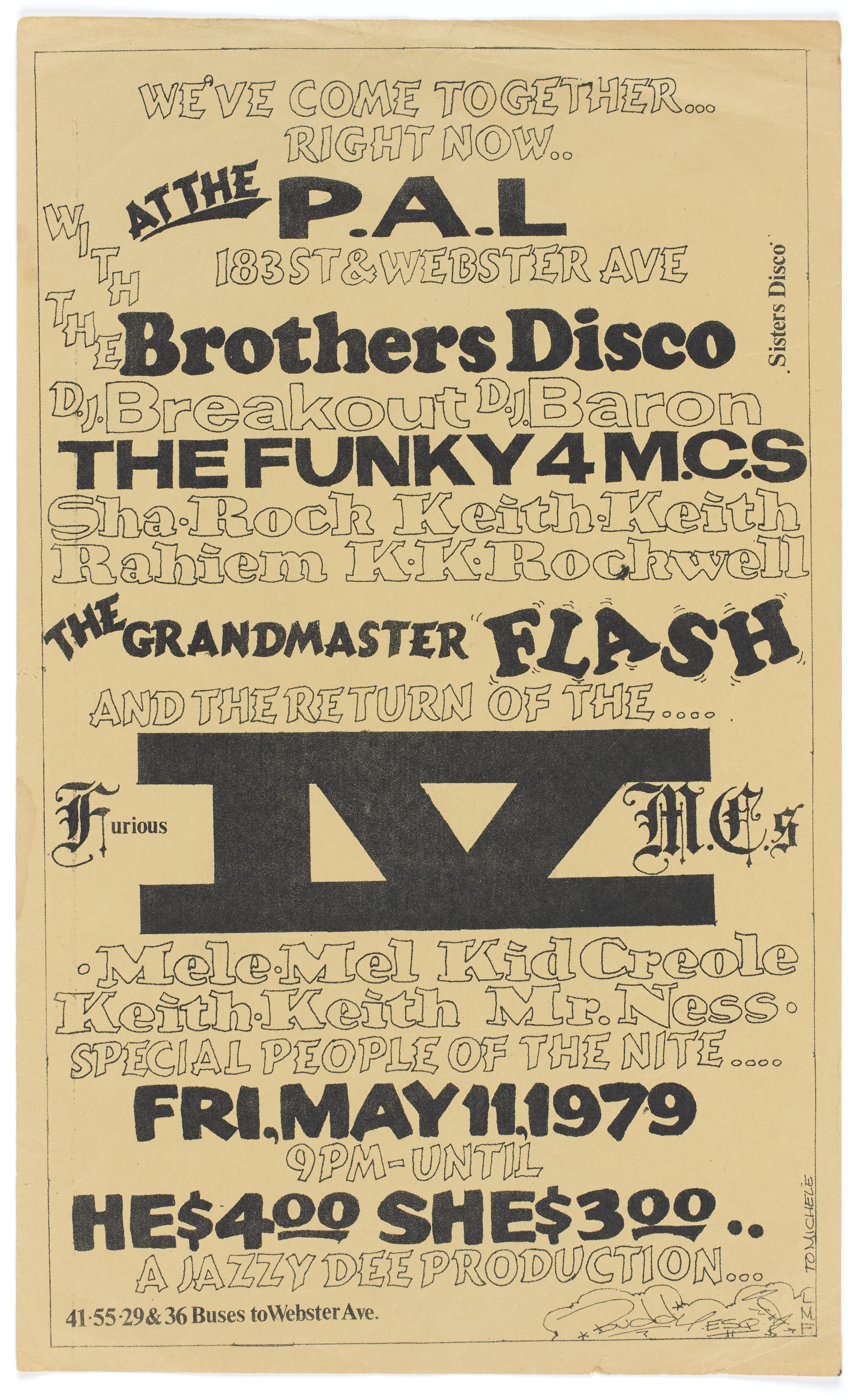
1979 Bronx Rap Battle. Design: Buddy Esquire. Image courtesy of Smithsonian National Museum of African American History and Culture

Prior to the formation of the Furious Five, Grandmaster Flash worked with the "L Brothers", which consisted of "Mean Gene" Livingston, Claudio Livingston and Grand Wizzard Theodore. Flash then recruited his friend Cowboy, Melle Mel and Kidd Creole (Nathaniel Glover). The trio called themselves the Three MC's, forming the first emcee group as it relates to rap as it is known today. Cowboy performed a "scat routine" at a party (at "The Black Door") for a friend who had just joined the U.S. Army. He began scat singing the words "hip/hop/hip/hop" in a way that mimicked the rhythmic cadence of the U.S. Army marching drill. He then worked the "hip hop" cadence into part of his performance. This led to the term "hip hoppers" being used derogatorily by the culture's early detractors, most of whom were from the disco set, to label the music used. This evolved into the term "Hip Hop" and was later adopted by the industry.

Melle Mel and Kidd Creole were the first rappers to call themselves "MCs" (Masters of Ceremonies). The 3 emcees worked with Flash, who went on to bring in Scorpio and Rahiem (Guy Todd Williams). After the formation of the Furious 5, Flash also worked with rapper Kurtis Blow doing parties in Queens. During the time Flash worked with Kurtis Blow, it was mainly due to internal disputes with the emcees, so for a short time prior to the formation of the Cold Crush Brothers in 1979, DJ Charlie Chase was the Furious 5's DJ.

Grandmaster Flash & The Furious 5 were the number one rap group on the streets of New York City before rap music was embraced by the music industry, setting the standard for all other emcee groups who came after them. The first single they released was "We Rap More Mellow", which was registered under the name The Younger Generation. The name change was made by the producer, who considered it better.

The group was popular locally, gaining recognition for their skillful raps and deejaying, but it was not until the Sugarhill Gang's "Rapper's Delight" proved that hip hop music could achieve mainstream success that they began recording. In 1979, they released their first single on Enjoy Records, "Superappin". The group went on to sign with Sylvia Robinson's Sugar Hill Records, following an agreement that they could perform over a then-popular DJ favorite.

=== Mainstream success and The Message (1980–1982) ===
1980 promotional still of Grandmaster Flash and the Furious Five on mainstream success

In 1980, the group released their Sugarhill Records debut, "Freedom", which reached #19 on the R&B chart and sold over 50,000 copies. The follow-up, "Birthday Party" was also a hit. In 1981, Grandmaster Flash released The Adventures of Grandmaster Flash on the Wheels of Steel, which was a multi-deck, live recording of one of his routines that featured Queen's "Another One Bites the Dust" and Chic's "Good Times". The release marked the first time that scratching & turntablism were featured on a record.

In 1982, the group released "The Message", which was produced by Clifton "Jiggs" Chase and Ed "Duke Bootee" Fletcher, the latter of whom wrote the song (Sylvia Robinson added Melle Mel's rhyme from an earlier song to complete the recording). It provided a political and social commentary and went on to become a driving force behind conscious hip-hop. The song peaked at #4 in the R&B chart and #62 in the pop chart, and established hip-hop's credibility in mainstream music. Other than Melle Mel, however, no members of the group (except for background vocals at the end) actually feature on the record.

Their debut album, also named The Message, went on to become a prominent achievement in the history of hip-hop.

=== Breakup (1983–1986) ===
In 1983, Grandmaster Flash, who had never appeared on any of the group's studio recordings, sued Sugar Hill Records for $5 million in unpaid royalties. This resulted in the single "White Lines (Don't Don't Do It)" being credited to "Grandmaster & Melle Mel." The song reached #47 in Billboard's Hot R&B/Hip-Hop Songs chart. Another lawsuit was filed over certain elements of the song being stolen from "Cavern" by Liquid Liquid, from which Sugar Hill Records would never recover.

The royalties dispute split the group. Melle Mel, Scorpio and Cowboy left after "White Lines (Don't Don't Do It)" was a hit. They formed Grandmaster Melle Mel and the Furious Five and released the album Grandmaster Melle Mel and the Furious Five in 1984. Meanwhile, Grandmaster Flash, Kidd Creole and Rahiem left for Elektra Records and added three new members to the group: Kevin "The Lord LaVon" Dukes, Russell "Mr. Broadway" Wheeler and "Larry-Love" Parker. They worked under the name "Grandmaster Flash" on They Said It Couldn't Be Done, The Source and Ba-Dop-Boom-Bang. The additional members The Lord La Von, Larry Love and Mr. Broadway formed the "Furious Five" but they could not use the name as Sugar Hill Records owned the rights.

Grandmaster Flash and his new "Furious Five" had a few hits with their three albums that made it to the top fifty of Billboard's R&B/Hip-Hop Albums chart, whereas Melle Mel and his group fared better. Grandmaster Melle Mel's most notable hit was "Beat Street Breakdown", which peaked at #8 in the R&B chart. Melle Mel also appeared in Chaka Khan's "I Feel for You", which won the Grammy Award for Best Female R&B Vocal Performance in 1985.

=== Reunion and waning popularity (1987–1988) ===
In 1987, the original lineup of Grandmaster Flash and the Furious Five reformed for a performance at a charity concert at Madison Square Garden. They soon reunited for their first studio album in nearly five years, recording On the Strength, which was released in April 1988. Reception of the album was lukewarm, and it failed to achieve the same levels of success as The Message. The group never enjoyed the same success as they did in the early 1980s and permanently broke up afterwards.

=== Permanent disbandment and post-On the Strength (1989–2022) ===
Since disbanding, some members of the group have briefly worked together. Melle Mel, Scorpio and Cowboy released another album as Grandmaster Melle Mel and the Furious Five, Piano, in 1989. Keith "Cowboy" Wiggins died on September 8, 1989.

In 1990, Grandmaster Flash produced Just-Ice's album Masterpiece. He went on to work as musical director for The Chris Rock Show, and later released The Official Adventures of Grandmaster Flash, Essential Mix: Classic Edition and The Bridge (Concept of a Culture). He has also received many accolades, including the DJ Vanguard Award from Bill Gates in 2004, RIAA's Lifetime Achievement Award at the Rock and Roll Hall of Fame and Museum in 2005, and BET's I Am Hip-Hop Icon Award in 2006. His autobiography, The Adventures of Grandmaster Flash: My Life, My Beats, was released in 2008.

In 1985, Melle Mel met Quincy Jones at the Grammys, and they began to collaborate for Back on the Block. This led to Mel being featured in the song "Back on the Block", which won him the Grammy Award for Best Rap Performance by a Duo or Group in 1991. He would pick up an additional Grammy Award for Best Spoken Word Album in 2002 for his contributions in Q: The Autobiography of Quincy Jones. 1997 saw him sign onto Straight Game Records and release Right Now with Mr. Ness/Scorpio. The album also featured Rondo; the two went on to form a group called Die Hard. In 2012, they released an album titled On Lock.

On January 23, 2007, Mel changed his name to Grandmaster Melle Mel and released his first solo studio album, Muscles. The first single and music video was "M3 – The New Message". He has also released the children's book The Portal in the Park, which features a CD on which children can read and rap along with him. This project featured a then-unknown Lady Gaga. She performs with Mel on the songs "World Family Tree" and "The Fountain Of Truth".

When asked of a possible reunion in 2002, Melle Mel responded:

It['s] not a question of whether we could get together or not [...] I just don['t] think that we could get a deal. The record company people just don['t] see a market for us.

However, 2014 saw Melle Mel and Scorpio begin playing shows across the United States, UK and Europe as Grandmaster's Furious Five ft Melle [sic] and Scorpio, culminating in them writing and recording new music. Their first single 'Some Kind of Sorry' was released on May 27, 2016, to coincide with a UK and European tour, which they are undertaking alongside The Sugarhill Gang.

On August 2, 2017, Nathaniel Glover (Kidd Creole) was arrested and charged with the murder of a New York city homeless man. In 2022, Glover was found guilty of manslaughter in relation to the case, and was sentenced to sixteen years in prison.

== Legacy and influence ==
Grandmaster Flash and the Furious Five are a well-respected group in the history of hip-hop music. They have been honored at the VH1 Hip Hop Honors in 2005 and were inducted into the Rock & Roll Hall of Fame in 2007. The Smithsonian National Museum of American History in Washington, D.C. displays in their historical archives the vinyl records and the turntable used by DJ Grandmaster Flash. In 2021, they received their first Grammy Award for lifetime achievement, becoming the second hip-hop act to receive the Grammy after Run-DMC.

They have influenced many musical acts such as Anthony Kiedis, New Order, The Cold Crush Brothers, Run-D.M.C., Whodini, Public Enemy, Boogie Down Productions, KRS-One, EPMD, Stetsasonic, Doug E. Fresh, Salt-n-Pepa, Ultramagnetic MC's, DJ Jazzy Jeff & the Fresh Prince, Eminem, Pharoahe Monch, Busta Rhymes, DJ Quik, Beastie Boys, Hieroglyphics (group), Too Short, Wu-Tang Clan, R.A. the Rugged Man, Digital Underground, Tupac Shakur, The Notorious B.I.G., N.W.A, Snoop Dogg, Ludacris, Heavy D and The Roots, among many others. Ice Cube recorded a song titled "Check Yo Self" with Das EFX, the remix of which sampled the music of "The Message."

== Discography ==
Studio albums

- The Message (1982)
- On the Strength (1988)
