= The Message (Grandmaster Flash and the Furious Five song) =

1982 single by Grandmaster Flash and the Furious Five

- Side A of the US 12-inch single

Single by Grandmaster Flash and the Furious Five

from the album The Message
- B-side: "The Message" (instrumental)
- Released: July 1, 1982
- Recorded: 1982
- Studio: Sweet Mountain (Englewood, New Jersey)
- Genre: Old-school hip-hop; conscious hip-hop; electro; progressive rap
- Length: 7:10
- Label: Sugar Hill
- Songwriters: Edward G. Fletcher; Melle Mel; Clifton "Jiggs" Chase; Sylvia Robinson
- Producers: Edward G. Fletcher; Sylvia Robinson

Grandmaster Flash and the Furious Five singles chronology
"Scorpio" (1981)	"The Message" (1982)	"New York New York" (1983)

Music video
- "The Message" on YouTube

"The Message" is a song by the American hip-hop group Grandmaster Flash and the Furious Five. It was released as a single by Sugar Hill Records on July 1, 1982, and was later featured on the group's debut studio album of the same name. The song was written in 1980 by rappers Duke Bootee and Melle Mel in response to the 1980 New York City transit strike, which is mentioned in the song's lyrics.

"The Message" was an early prominent hip-hop song to provide social commentary. The song's lyrics describe the stress of inner-city poverty. In the final verses, a child born in the ghetto without prospects in life is lured away into a life of crime, for which he is jailed until he commits suicide in his cell. The song ends with a brief skit in which the band members are arrested for no clear reason.

"The Message" took rap music from the house parties of its origin to the social platforms later developed by groups like Public Enemy and KRS-One. Melle Mel said in an interview with NPR: "Our group, like Flash and the Furious Five, we didn't actually want to do 'The Message' because we was used to doing party raps and boasting how good we are and all that."

Commercially, it reached number 62 in the United States and made the year-end charts in the Netherlands and Australia.

== Reception ==
=== Accolades and usage in media ===
The song was ranked as number 1 "Track of the Year" for 1982 by NME.

In 2004, Rolling Stone ranked "The Message" No. 51 in its list of the 500 Greatest Songs of All Time. It had the highest position for any 1980s release and was the highest-ranking hip-hop song on the list. In 2012, the publication named it the greatest hip-hop song of all time. In 2025, the song was ranked number 16 on Rolling Stone's "The 100 Best Protest Songs of All Time" list.

It was voted No. 3 on About.com's Top 100 Rap Songs, after Common's "I Used to Love H.E.R." and the Sugarhill Gang's "Rapper's Delight".

In 2002, its first year of archival, it was one of 50 recordings chosen by the Library of Congress to be added to the National Recording Registry, the first hip hop recording ever to receive this honor.

"The Message" was number 5 on VH1's 100 Greatest Songs of Hip Hop.

"The Message" is number 1 on HipHopGoldenAge's Top 100 Hip Hop Songs of the 1980s".

The song was featured in the soundtrack for the video game Grand Theft Auto: Vice City, on the in-game radio station Wildstyle. It was also featured in the video game Fuser.

=== Music and structure ===
Dan Cairns of The Sunday Times has described "The Message"'s musical innovation: "Where it was inarguably innovative, was in slowing the beat right down, and opening up space in the instrumentation—the music isn't so much hip-hop as noirish, nightmarish slow-funk, stifling and claustrophobic, with electro, dub and disco also jostling for room in the genre mix—and thereby letting the lyrics speak loud and clear". The song utilizes a mix of musical genres, and allows the beat to take a backseat to the stark lyrical content.

=== Critical reception ===
Writing in The Boston Phoenix, Sally Cragin said that the "ominous descending bassline echoes the mood—detached, preoccupied, persistent—and Flash's refrain pinpoints his perilous, repressed rage."

In addition to being widely regarded as an all-time rap anthem, "The Message" has been credited by many critics as the song that catapulted emcees from the background to the forefront of hip hop. The focus was thus shifted from the grandmaster mixing and scratching to the thoughts and lyrics of the emcee. David Hickley wrote in 2004 that "The Message" also crystallized a critical shift within rap itself. It confirmed that emcees, or rappers, had vaulted past the deejays as the stars of the music". In 2022, it was included in the list "The story of NME in 70 (mostly) seminal songs", at number 20: Mark Beaumont wrote that with this song, "the invigorating grooves of this early breakout rap hit laid the foundations for the [...] hip-hop wars to come".

== Charts ==
=== Weekly charts ===
Chart (1982–83)	Peak position
Australia (Kent Music Report)	21
Austria (Ö3 Austria Top 40)	9
Netherlands (Dutch Top 40)	6
Netherlands (Single Top 100)	10
France (IFOP)	87
New Zealand Singles Chart	2
Swiss Singles Chart	11
UK Singles Chart	8
U.S. Billboard Hot 100	62
U.S. Billboard Hot Black Singles	4
U.S. Billboard Hot Dance Club Play	12

=== Year-end charts ===
Chart (1983)	Position
Australia (Kent Music Report)	85
Netherlands (Dutch Top 40)	95

== Uses in popular culture ==
The rhythm track has been sampled in various hip hop songs, including Sinbad's 1990 comedy song "Brain Damaged", the remix for the 1993 song "Check Yo Self" by Ice Cube, the 1997 song "Can't Nobody Hold Me Down" by Puff Daddy, the 2011 song "Teen Pregnancy" by Blank Banshee, and the 2022 song "Players" by Coi Leray.

On the DVD The Genesis Songbook, the band and producer Hugh Padgham revealed that the inspiration for Phil Collins' menacing laugh on their 1983 song "Mama" came from "The Message".

The refrain beginning with "Don't push me 'cuz I'm close to the edge" was referenced in the animated movie Happy Feet.

A line from the song was sampled in "Movement in Still Life" by BT, the title track from his 1999 album Movement in Still Life.

In 2005, a mural inspired by "The Message" was painted in the Newtown neighbourhood of Sydney, Australia by artist Colin Bebe. "It's Like a Jungle Sometimes" depicts the streets of Newtown as a literal jungle, with animals roaming the streets and swinging from poles, as a commentary on the artist's mental health and struggle with suicideality. In September 2017, street art-based advertising agency Apparition Media painted over it with a mural promoting the film Mother!, featuring a giant portrait of Jennifer Lawrence and the caption "#mothermovie." Much public outrage followed, as the mural had become much-loved in the community. Within hours, it had been graffitied by someone who added: "Fuck off! It really is a jungle sometimes. No respect!" Apparition Media apologised and word of the incident also reached Mother!'s director, Darren Aronofsky, who tweeted that he was "embarrassed and furious" and would pay for the mural to be restored. It was restored in December 2017.

A reference to the lyrics was included in the song Cabinet Battle #1 from the 2015 musical Hamilton.

In 2007, the 25th anniversary of "The Message", Melle Mel changed the spelling of his first name to Mele Mel and released "M3 - The New Message" as the first single to his first ever solo album, Muscles. 2007 was also the year that Grandmaster Flash and the Furious Five became the first hip-hop act ever to be inducted into the Rock and Roll Hall of Fame.

A Swedish translation/adaptation of the song, "Budskapet", was released by Timbuktu in May 2013, following the riots in Husby and other suburbs of Stockholm.

== Remixes ==
- "The Message '95" (Die Fantastischen Vier Remix) (1995, East West Records)
- "The Message" – 1997, Deepbeats Records (DEEPCD001)
