= Hype man =

Backup rapper and/or singer

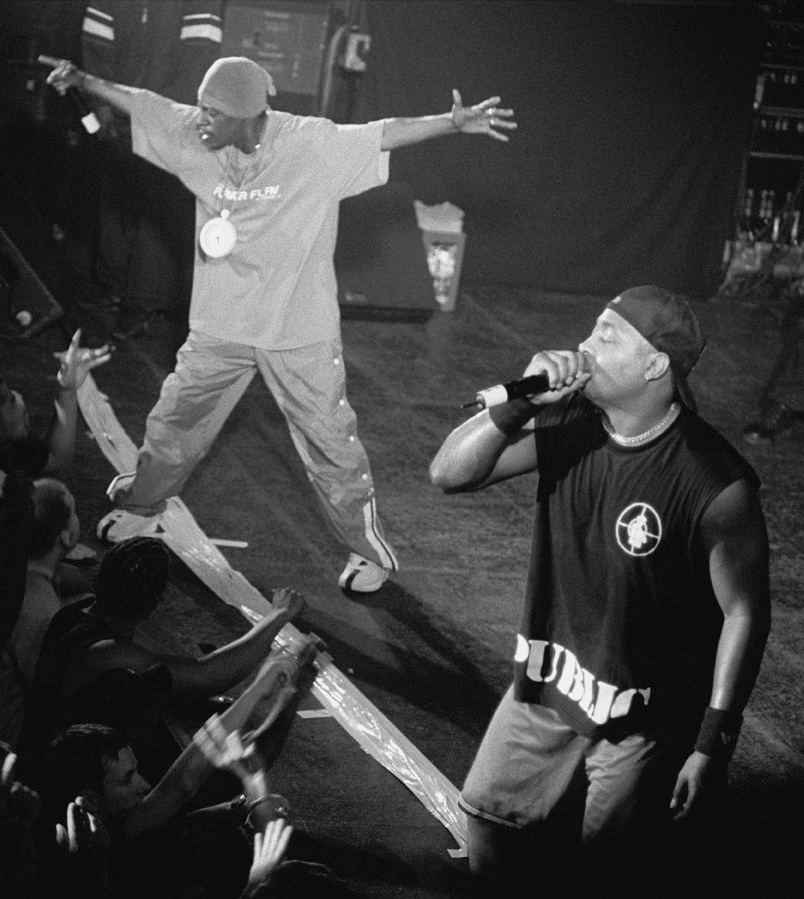
Hype man Flavor Flav (left) exciting the crowd while lead rapper Chuck D performs.

A hype man, typically in hip-hop music, is a backing vocalist who supports the primary performer with exclamations, interjections, or ad-libs in an attempt to increase an audience's excitement or engagement.

== Origins ==
Early hype men included MC Cowboy and Kidd Creole of Grandmaster Flash and the Furious Five. Kool Moe Dee calls Creole "the original hype man".

== Techniques ==
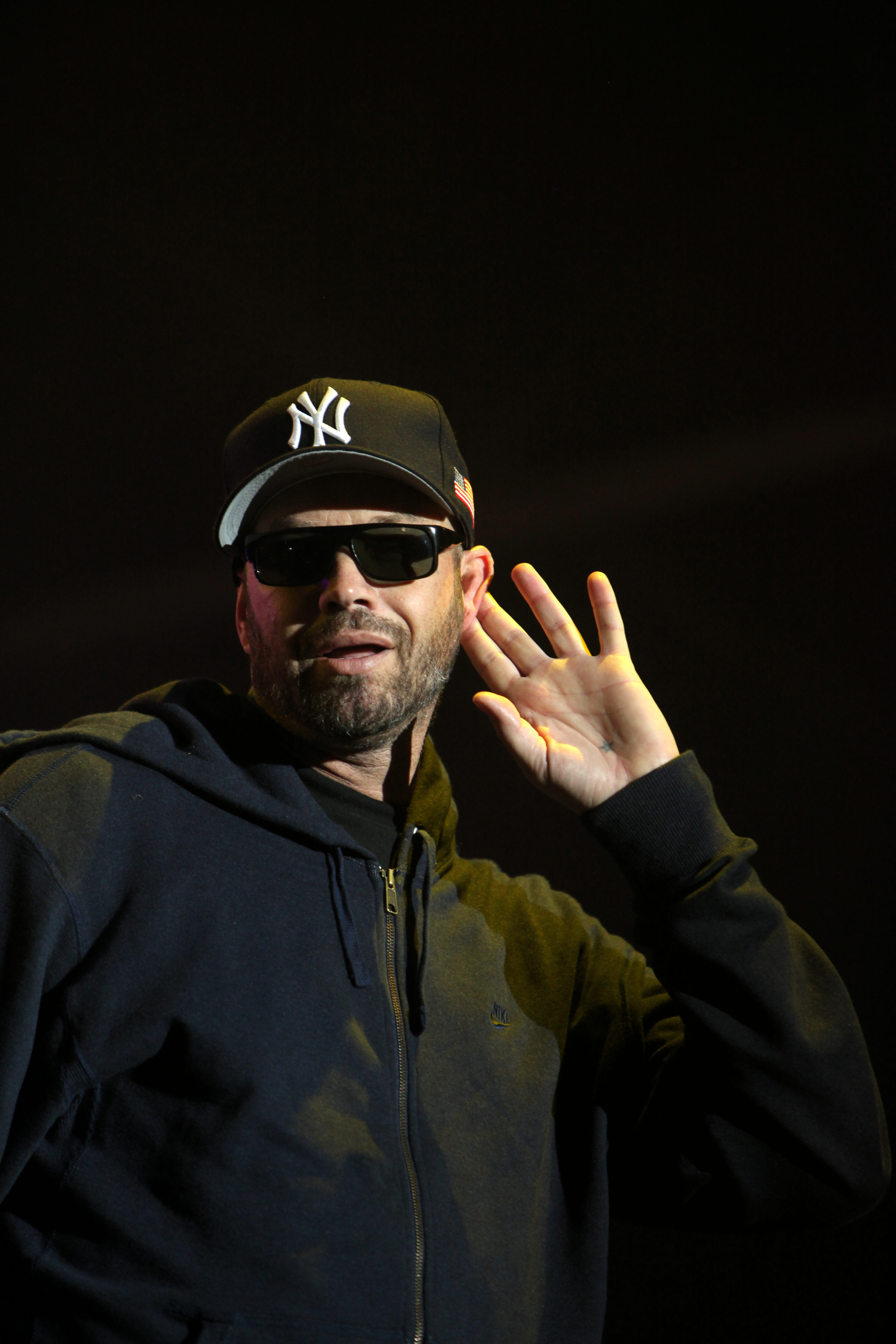
House of Pain's hype man Danny Boy O'Connor doing the call-and-response technique

Often the hype man will use call-and-response chants in order to excite the crowd. For example, they will exhort the crowd to "Throw your hands in the air" and "Everybody say ho!", phrases coined by MC Cowboy.

The hype man's interjections are also planned to give the MC an opportunity to breathe, and give the illusion of an unbroken flow. Music writer Mickey Hess expands the term as follows: "a hype man is a figure who plays a central but supporting role within a group, making his own interventions, generally aimed at hyping up the crowd while also drawing attention to the words of the MC".

Rapper Royce da 5'9" describes how a hype man can contribute to a live performance: "a lot of my verses [can] be so constant with the flow [that] I'd need somebody to help me." Lateef the Truthspeaker has stated, "You're gonna have to have somebody say something somewhere to give you a breath... usually it's just a matter of getting somebody to hit some line or some word in a line—that's all you really need."

== Hype men who became lead rappers and producers ==
Prior to becoming a lead rapper himself, Jay-Z began his career as a hype man for Jaz-O and was later the hype man for Big Daddy Kane.

Icons of Hip Hop also notes that some producers, such as Diddy, Lil Jon, Swizz Beatz, and Jermaine Dupri, "have transitioned from a hype man role to become rappers and stars in their own right".

== Hype men in rock and pop music ==
Occasionally pop or rock groups include a member up front alongside the lead singer who may perform backup vocals or percussion but largely functions to excite the audience through dancing and/or stage patter. Examples include Bob Nastanovich for Pavement, Bez of The Happy Mondays, Beau Beau Butler of Avail, and Guy Picciotto in Fugazi's earliest incarnation.

== List of notable hype men ==
- Danny Boy O'Connor for House of Pain
- Diddy for the Notorious B.I.G.
- Fatman Scoop (for various artists)
- Flavor Flav for Public Enemy
- Freaky Tah of the Lost Boyz
- Joe C. for Kid Rock
- Tony Yayo for 50 Cent and G-Unit
- Kendrick Lamar for Jay Rock
- Luke for the 2 Live Crew
- Memphis Bleek for Jay-Z
- Proof and Mr. Porter of D12 for Eminem
- Schoolboy Q for Kendrick Lamar
- Spliff Star for Busta Rhymes
- John Goblikon (portrayed by Dave Rispoli) for Nekrogoblikon
- Skerrit Bwoy for Major Lazer
- Shai Tsabari for Berry Sakharof

== See also ==
- Master of ceremonies § In music and cultural events
