= The Holy Book of Hip Hop =

The Holy Book of Hip-Hop was a catalogue of musical samples used in hip-hop music, published in 2001 by Black Glove Publishing. The Los Angeles Times has identified its origins as an illicit print version of Blaine Armsterd's "Sampling FAQ", which was itself compiled from Armsterd's own record collection, from liner notes, and from posts to Usenet. The Journal of the Society for American Music has referred to it as a "predecessor" of "websites like WhoSampled".

Shortly after its publication, Vice praised it as "thorough-ass", "a dope and informative tool" and superior to "those Strictly Breaks comp[ilation]s", noting that it goes "from the obvious (...) to the rather obscure", and faulting it only for lacking an index. In 2021, however, Pitchfork noted that "many of its entries turned out to be incorrect".
