= Kidd Creole =

American hip hop artist and convicted killer

- Glover at age 34

Background information
- Born: Nathaniel Glover; February 19, 1960 (age 66); The Bronx, New York City, U.S.
- Genre: Hip-hop
- Occupations: Rapper
- Years active: 1978–2017
- Labels: Enjoy; Sugar Hill; Elektra
- Formerly of: Grandmaster Flash and the Furious Five

Nathaniel Glover (born February 19, 1960), also known as Nate or Danny Glover and better known by the stage name Kidd Creole, is an American former hip-hop recording artist. He was a member of the pioneering old-school hip hop group Grandmaster Flash & the Furious Five with his brother Melle Mel. In August 2017, Glover stabbed a homeless man to death in an altercation in Manhattan in New York City. In May 2022, he was sentenced to 16 years in prison for manslaughter.

== Biography ==
Glover was born in the Bronx, New York in 1960 as the third of five children to a working-class family. In July 1977, Nate and his brother Melvin met Joseph Saddler, a local DJ who went by the name Grandmaster Flash. The brothers and Keef Cowboy (Keith Wiggins) joined Grandmaster Flash's budding group the Three MC's in 1978. Melvin took the name Melle Mel while Nate took the name Kidd Creole, a reference to the Elvis Presley film King Creole.

Two more MCs would join the group: Scorpio (originally Mr. Ness, aka Ed Morris) and Raheim (Guy Williams). The group recorded two singles (one as the Younger Generation and one as Flash & the Five) before they took the name Grandmaster Flash & the Furious Five and recorded the Superappin' EP for Enjoy Records, owned by R&B record producer Bobby Robinson. Kidd Creole participated in the recording of several records with the group between 1980 and 1983. Tensions developed between Nate and his more successful brother Melvin; Melle Mel became the frontman and main songwriter for the band and was the singer in the band's most popular work, the 1982 song "The Message". Melle Mel was also on better terms with the recording label Sugar Hill and its managers, the Robinsons, than Creole. Flash, Rahiem, and Creole left The Furious Five in 1983. They continued to record together for Elektra Records from 1983–1987, later rejoining Melle Mel and the others for a brief reunion in 1987.

The later years of the group and its members were less successful; they produced no hits, and audiences shrank as tastes turned to new groups such as Run DMC in the mid-1980s. Creole disputed with Sugar Hill over a lack of royalty payments on earlier work. Creole eventually was unable to continue a full-time career as a musician, and took various temporary jobs while continuing to do occasional concert tours on the side.

Glover had been arrested for firearm possession in 1982 and 1995, and possession of a knife in 2007. In 2017, Glover was living in the Mount Hope neighborhood of the Bronx and had been working as a handyman and security guard in midtown Manhattan. According to security camera footage, on the night of August 2, 2017, he had a conversation with John Jolly, a local homeless man. The two left the field of view, and Jolly was stabbed to death. Glover admitted that he had stabbed Jolly with a knife he kept on his person, although he claimed he was provoked; in his initial confession, he said he thought that Jolly was making sexual advances on him. Glover was arrested and charged with murder.

At trial, the judge instructed the jury to disregard his legal defense's claims of self-defense, as Jolly was unarmed and thus not capable of posing a deadly threat to Glover by New York law, weakening Glover's case. The jury found Glover guilty of first degree manslaughter on April 6, 2022. On May 4, he was sentenced to 16 years in prison plus 5 years supervision.

== Discography ==
=== Albums ===
- The Message (1982), Sugar Hill
- They Said It Couldn't Be Done (1985), Elektra
- The Source (1986), Elektra
- Ba-Dop-Boom-Bang (1987), Elektra
- On the Strength (1988), Elektra

=== Singles ===
- "Superrappin’" (1979), Enjoy - 12-inch single
- "Freedom" (1980), Sugar Hill
- "Grandmaster Flash on the Wheels of Steel" (1981), Sugar Hill - 12-inch single
