= Hip-hop =

Music genre

- Other names: Hip hop; rap music; rap
- Stylistic origins: Disco; funk; jazz; blues; scat singing; R&B; soul; dub; spoken word; talking blues; performance poetry
- Cultural origins: Early 1970s, the Bronx, New York City, U.S.
- Typical instruments: Voice (rapping, singing); turntable; mixer; drum machine; sampler; sequencer; synthesizer; keyboard
- Derivative forms: Breakbeat; Baltimore club; Beatdown hardcore; Contemporary R&B; Florida breaks; footwork; funk ostentação; ghetto house; ghettotech; glitch hop; grime; illbient; Latin freestyle; wonky; nu metal; funk carioca; reggaeton; alternative reggaeton; mahraganat

Subgenres
- Alternative hip-hop; boom bap; bounce; Brazilian rap geek; Brooklyn drill; Chicano rap; chopper; chopped and screwed; Christian hip-hop; cloud rap; comedy hip-hop; conscious hip-hop; crunk; disco rap; dirty rap; drill; East Coast hip-hop; experimental hip-hop; frat rap; freestyle rap; funk carioca; G-funk; gangsta rap; hardcore hip-hop; hipster hop; horrorcore; hyphy; instrumental hip-hop; jerk; hexD; Jewish hip-hop; jerk rap; Latin hip-hop; Latin trap; lofi hip-hop; lowend; Memphis rap; Miami bass; mumble rap; nerdcore; phonk; plugg (pluggnb); political hip-hop; progressive rap; rage; road rap; scam rap; snap; sigilkore; digicore; Southern hip-hop; tread; trap; turntablism; UK drill; West Coast hip-hop

Fusion genres
- Country rap; electro; chap hop; emo rap; hip-hop soul; neo soul; glitchcore; hip house; crunkcore; industrial hip-hop; jazz rap; new jack swing; psychedelic; pop rap; punk rap (rapcore); ragga hip-hop; rap opera; rap rock (rap metal); trap metal; trip hop

Regional scenes
- African hip-hop; Asian hip-hop; Australian hip-hop; Canadian hip-hop; European hip-hop; Latin hip-hop; Middle Eastern hip-hop

Local scenes
- Midwestern hip-hop; Southern hip-hop; East Coast hip-hop; West Coast hip-hop

Other topics
- African-American music; Old-school hip-hop; New-school hip-hop; Golden age hip-hop; Underground hip-hop; Internet rap; SoundCloud rap

Hip-hop (also known as rap music or simply rap) is a genre of popular music that emerged in the early 1970s alongside an associated subculture in New York City. The musical style is a synthesis of a wide range of techniques, but rapping is frequent enough that it has become a defining characteristic. Other key markers of the genre are the disc jockey (DJ), turntablism, scratching, beatboxing, and instrumental tracks. The hip-hop genre and culture emerged from block parties in the Bronx, with influences from African-American, Afro-Caribbean, and Latino communities.

DJs began expanding the instrumental breaks of popular records when they noticed how excited it would make the crowds. The extended breaks provided a platform for break dancers and rappers. These breakbeats enabled the subsequent evolution of the hip-hop style. Many of the records used were disco due to its popularity at the time. This disco-inflected music was originally known as disco rap and later described as "old-school hip-hop".

In the mid-1980s, hip-hop began to diversify as electro music started to inform the genre's new school. The period between the mid-1980s and mid-1990s became known as hip-hop's "golden age", as the genre earned widespread critical acclaim and generated massive sales. Across the United States, several regional scenes emerged, most notably on the East and West Coasts, as well as in the South, which included the Houston, Atlanta and Memphis rap scenes. This era saw the emergence of popular styles such as G-funk, boom bap and gangsta rap, as well as more experimental genres like alternative hip-hop and jazz rap, which stemmed from the Native Tongues movement, alongside progressive and conscious hip-hop.

In the late 1990s to mid-2000s, the popularity of hip-hop further expanded with the club-oriented "bling era". The late 2000s and early 2010s saw the rise of the "blog era" and Internet rap, with young artists using the Internet to cultivate a following. In the mid-to-late 2010s, trap music and Soundcloud rap surged in popularity, which led to several commercially successful artists. In 2017, hip-hop became the bestselling genre of popular music in the United States and had also developed its own regional variations around the world.

== Etymology ==
"Hip-hop" has been in use since the 17th century to mean a succession of hops. In George Villiers's 1671 play The Rehearsal, Prince Volscius exits a scene awkwardly with one boot on and the other off. The director of the scene exclaims, "to go off hip hop, hip hop, upon this occasion, is a thousand times better than any conclusion in the world".

A common variation on "hip hop" is "hippity hop", which was in wide usage by the 19th century. It appears in works like a poem from 1882 where four children sing, "[h]ippity hop to the candy shop!" It was a common refrain in skipping games.

Many dance steps include a hop. By the 18th century, "hop" began to be used interchangeably with "dance" as both a noun and a verb.

=== Usage ===
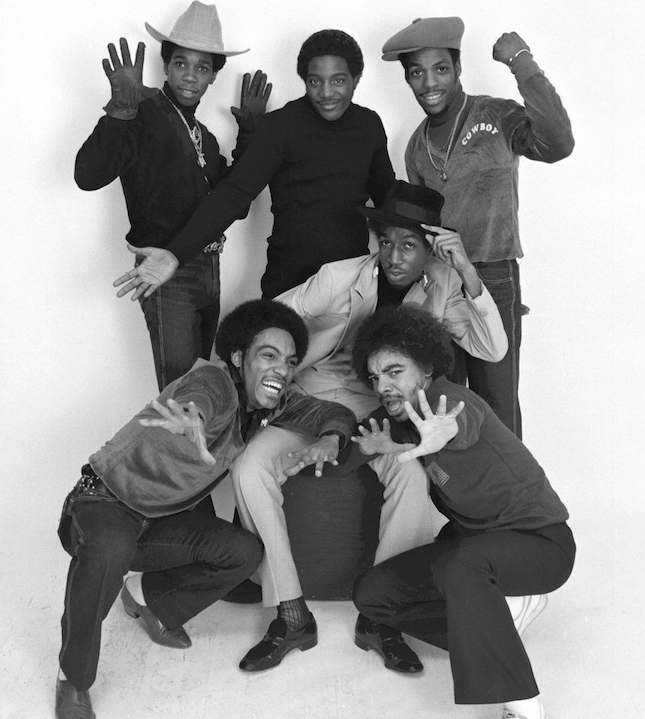
Keef Cowboy (top right) with Grandmaster Flash and the Furious Five in 1982

An early usage of "hip hop" in recorded popular music is found in The Dovells' 1963 dance song "You Can't Sit Down", "...you gotta slop, bop, flip flop, hip hop, never stop". A decade later, Disco disc jockeys would pepper their sets with exhortations to the crowd, which is why the emerging style was originally known as "disco rap". One of DJ Hollywood's chants was "hip hop de hippy hop the body rock". Lovebug Starsky recalls originating the phrase when he messed up the change between records, "I picked up the mic and just started saying 'a hip hop, hip hop, de hibbyhibbyhibbyhibby hop'", claiming credit for inventing the name by 1979.

In another version of Starsky's tale, he coined "hip-hop" with Keef Cowboy from Grandmaster Flash and the Furious Five as they traded jibes at a friend who was going into the Army. Kidd Creole recalls the scene without Lovebug present, "Cowboy was on the mic playin around doing that Army cadence: Hip/Hop/Hip/Hop...Disco was king at the time, and the Disco crowd referred to us as those 'Hip Hoppers', but they used it as a derogatory term. But Cowboy was the first one I heard do that to music, as part of his crowd response."

The phrase was in common usage by the time The Sugarhill Gang recorded "Rapper's Delight" in 1979. The chorus begins, "I said a hip-hop, the hippie, the hippie/To the hip, hip-hop and you don't stop the rockin'".

By the early 1980s, hip-hop's definition had expanded into "the all inclusive tag for the rapping, breaking, graffiti-writing, crew fashion wearing street sub-culture". Afrika Bambaataa was instrumental in turning the term into a positive force through his Universal Zulu Nation. Their social movement was anti-drug and anti-violence.

As rappers began to dominate hip-hop, the terms became synonymous. However, hip-hop's definition has always applied to its entire culture. Its four principal elements include rapping, DJing, breakdancing, and graffiti art. Knowledge is sometimes described as a fifth element, underscoring its role in shaping the values and promoting empowerment and consciousness-raising through music.

KRS-One identified additional elements: self-expression, street fashion, street language, street knowledge, and street entrepreneurialism. He also recognized girls' Double Dutch jump rope as a key stylistic component of breakdancing.

In addition to borrowing from the culture, hip-hop simultaneously comments on it. From its roots in the Bronx to its current global reach, hip-hop has served as a voice for the disenfranchised, shedding light on issues such as racial inequality, poverty, and police brutality.

== Historical background ==
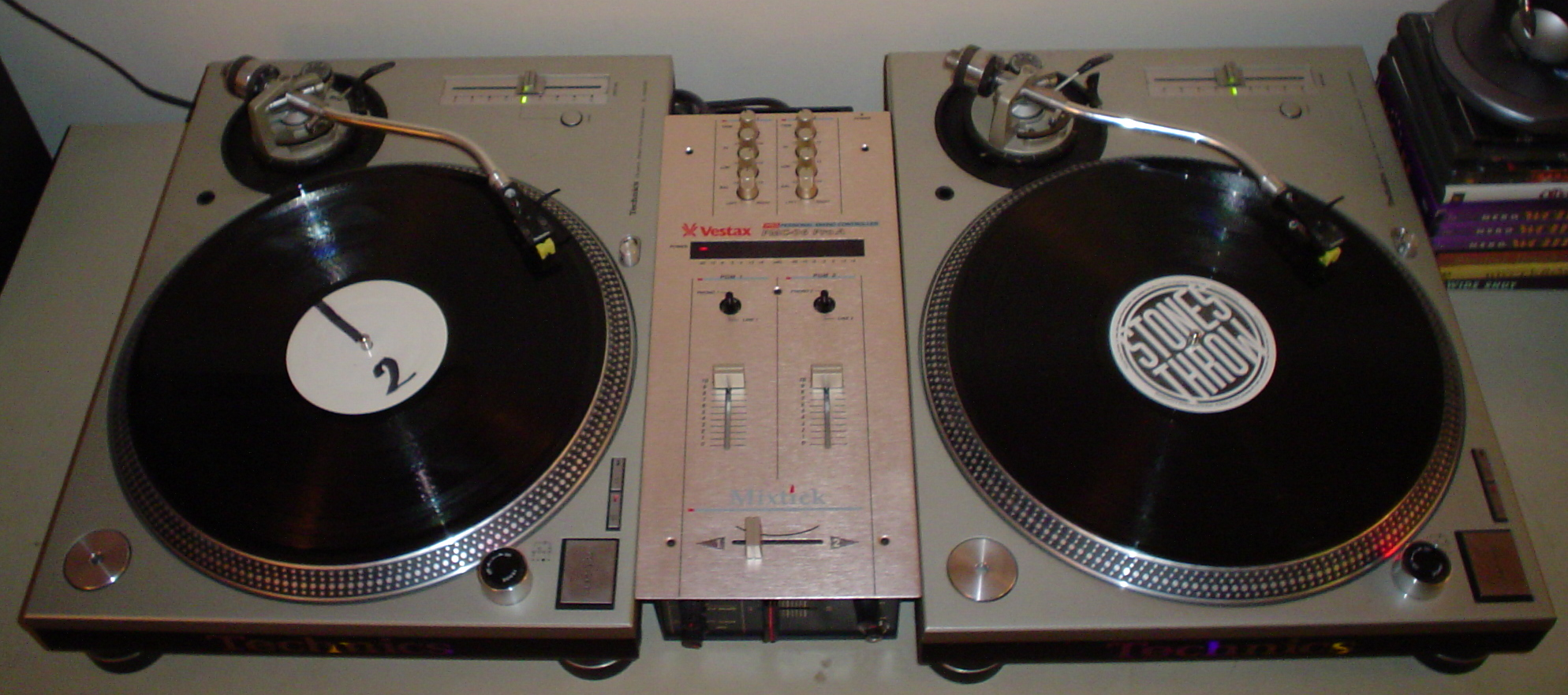
Set of Technics 1200 turntables with a Vestax PMC-06 Pro A mixer

Hip-hop's initial medium was the turntable. Vinyl records were the primary source for DJs who reworked songs into new material for dancing. The process echoed the appropriation of styles that created jazz decades earlier. The genres hip-hop initially assimilated were wide-ranging, but its primary sources were disco and funk records.

Nowhere was this cross-pollination of musics better typified than in the Caribbean island of Jamaica, where AM radio signals from Miami, Florida, were audible. In the late 1950s, the U.S. stations played much more invigorating rhythm and blues music than the staid BBC which was syndicated by the island's only radio channel, Jamaica Broadcasting Corporation. American DJs like Jocko Henderson and Jockey Jack introduced R&B records and jive talking to the island. Local DJs soon began setting up sound systems for outdoor parties. A vibrant music scene emerged. The jive of American DJs transmuted into toasts in Jamaican Patois.

Jive talk popularized black-appeal stations in the post-war era. Its double entendres were a godsend to radio, re-invigorating ratings at flagging outlets. It emerged from traditions like call and response, signifyin', the dozens, capping, and jazz poetry. The transition from oral tradition to the commercial airwaves was exemplified by WDIA disc jockeys like Nat D. and Rufus Thomas. Their on-air jive was honed during their hosting duties at the Palace Theatre's Amateur Night on Beale Street in Memphis, Tennessee. D.J's like Chicago's Al Benson (WJJD), Austin's Doctor Hep Cat (KVET), and Atlanta's Jockey Jack (WERD) spoke the same rhyming, cadence-laden rap style. They might introduce a great musician like, "Here is a guy that will move you in from the outskirts of town because he breathes natural gas...so droop to listening to a real gone cat whose loaded his knowledge box in the house of the righteous, and can lo blow." Many white DJ's like John R Richbourg on Nashville's WLAC emulated the southern 'mushmouth' and jive talk, and switched out swing music for blues and bebop. The jive-talking rappers of 1950s radio inspired musical comedians like Rudy Ray Moore, Pigmeat Markham, and Blowfly, along with soul singer James Brown. They have been called "godfathers" of hip-hop music.

"Here Comes the Judge"
"Here Comes the Judge" (1968) by Pigmeat Markham contains boastful rhyming dialogue over a funky drum beat, symbolizing a precursor to hip-hop.

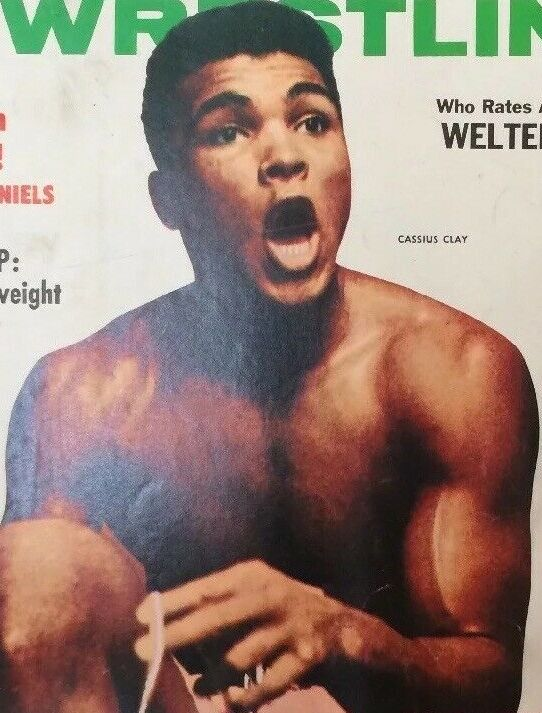
Muhammad Ali, a major influence on hip-hop

The rhythmic speech of rap is an ancient practice, first codified by the Greeks. In 20th-century Western music, it was a widely used practice in everything from sprechstimme to the talking blues. The roots of rapping in African-American music are easily traced to the griots in West African culture. Bo Diddley made several influential talking records, and the gospel group The Jubalaires' 1946 song "Noah" is frequently seen as a forerunner of rap. Other notable talking records were Muhammad Ali's I Am the Greatest (1963) and Pigmeat Markham's "Here Comes the Judge" (1968). Ali's patter was an enormous influence on hip-hop. He was known as a "rhyming trickster" due to the funky delivery of his boasts, trash talk, and indelible phrases. Many of his monologues were freestyle improvisations, which became a vital skill of old-school hip-hop rappers.

In New York City, spoken-word poetry by artists like The Last Poets, Jalal Mansur Nuriddin, and Gil Scott-Heron had a significant impact on the post-civil rights era. They helped establish the cultural environment in which hip-hop music was created.

During these proto-rap years in America, Jamaican music regularly featured talking records like U-Roy and Peter Tosh's "Righteous Ruler" and King Stitt's "Fire Corner" in 1969. Jamaican DJs were also heavily remixing recorded music to generate new sounds. Duke Reid would preside over his sound system, tweaking knobs until the record he was playing became unrecognizable. In the studio, artists like King Tubby would strip the vocals out of records to create a new version. The public appetite for these remixes became so strong that singles were released with the original on one side and the "version" on the other. The eclectic stew of production techniques came to be known as dub music, and it is the strongest artistic precedent for hip-hop.

== 1973–1979: Birth of hip-hop ==
=== Breaking ===
By the 1970s, The Bronx had been cut in half by the Cross Bronx Expressway. The construction accelerated "white flight" from the neighborhood and concentrated lower income African American, Latin American, and Caribbean residents in the southern half of the borough. This massive, multi-ethnic, working class community is where hip-hop was born. The traditions of these ethnicities all informed the emerging genre. As all music does, hip-hop reflected the social, economic, and political realities of its creators, who were sometimes disenfranchised and marginalized.

The dominant genre of the time was disco. Even black radio stations were playing hit disco records as they targeted larger suburban audiences. The way Europe stripped the blackness out of funk and disco and streamlined it became a target for parody in the black community. George Clinton mercilessly lampooned it as "The Placebo Syndrome" in his P-Funk mythology. Even though disco birthed hip-hop, much of the genre's early spirit was a rebellion against its parent. Hip-hop first had to inherit the rich trove of studio and DJ techniques that disco innovated.

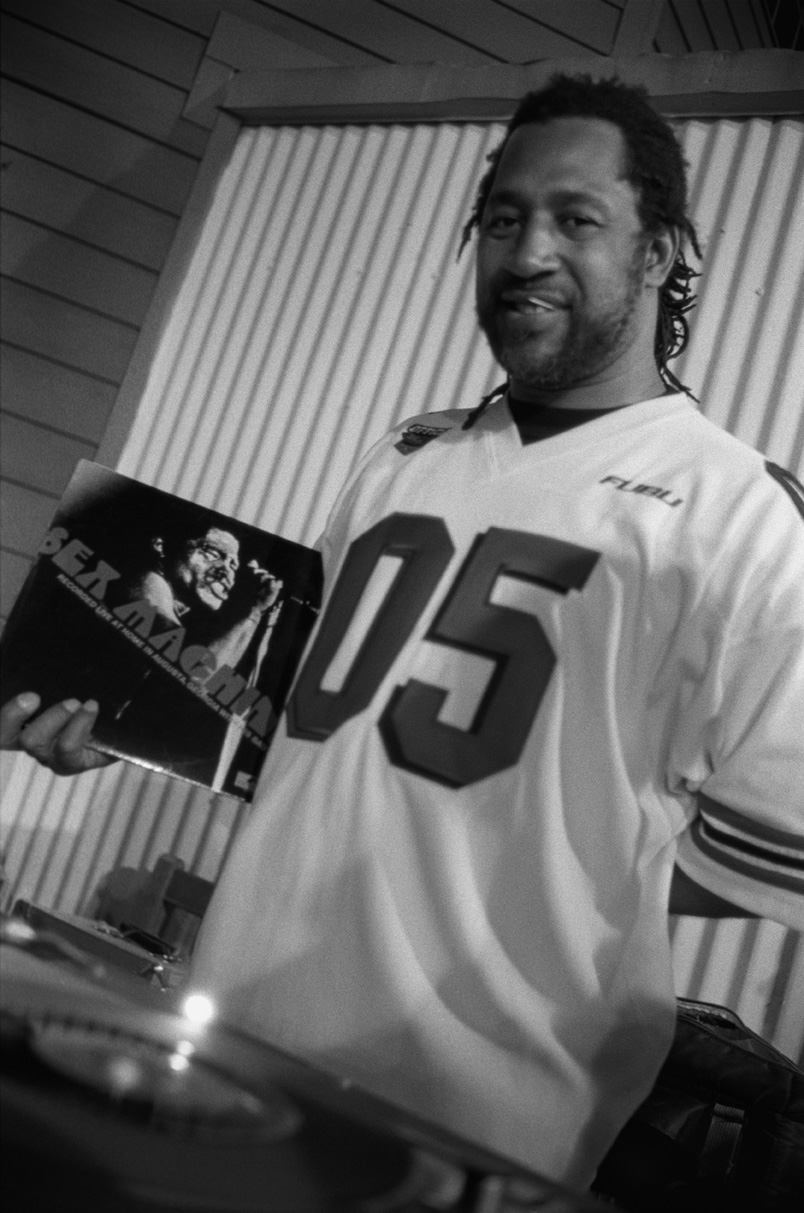
DJ Kool Herc in 1999

It became trendy for dancers to use the instrumental break in a song to show off their best moves. Some would even forego dancing until the break in a record came on. The practice became known as "breakdancing", and it increased demand for breaks that DJs would soon supply. These dancers became known as "B-girls" and "B-boys". "B" could be short for "break", "beat", "battle", or "Bronx" depending on who was using it.

One of the most popular clubs was the Plaza Tunnel in the basement of the Concourse Plaza Hotel where DJ John Brown held sway. To keep people moving, he would mix a wide range of records like Jimmy Castor Bunch's "It's Just Begun", The Isley Brothers' "Get Into Something", Earth, Wind & Fire's "Moment of Truth", Rare Earth's "Get Ready", Redbone's "Maggie", and Chicago's "I'm a Man".

Breakdancers prized originality. They created signature moves that other breakers would only imitate in order to outdo them. The emphasis on creativity extended to DJs who would battle each other. They would even replicate the Jamaican practice of removing record labels to keep their breaks a secret from other DJs. Many early hip-hop DJs were immigrants from the Caribbean. The techniques they used to generate new material from existing vinyl records was familiar to Jamaican dub music. Hip-hop began to develop its own moral code that prized truth and ingenuity over limpid mimicry.

DJs found certain breaks to be extremely popular from records like Baby Huey's "Listen To Me", James Brown's "Give It Up or Turnit a Loose", Dennis Coffey's "Son of Scorpio", Cymande's "Bra", Dynamic Corvettes' "Funky Music Is the Thing", Jeannie Reynolds' "Fruit Song", as well as the Incredible Bongo Band's "Apache" and "Bongo Rock". DJ Kool Herc figured out a way to prolong these breaks by crossfading between two copies of the same record. Herc's initial claim to fame was his sound system which featured a McIntosh Laboratory amplifier and two columns of Shure speakers. He dubbed it "The Herculords", and it earned him a massive following.

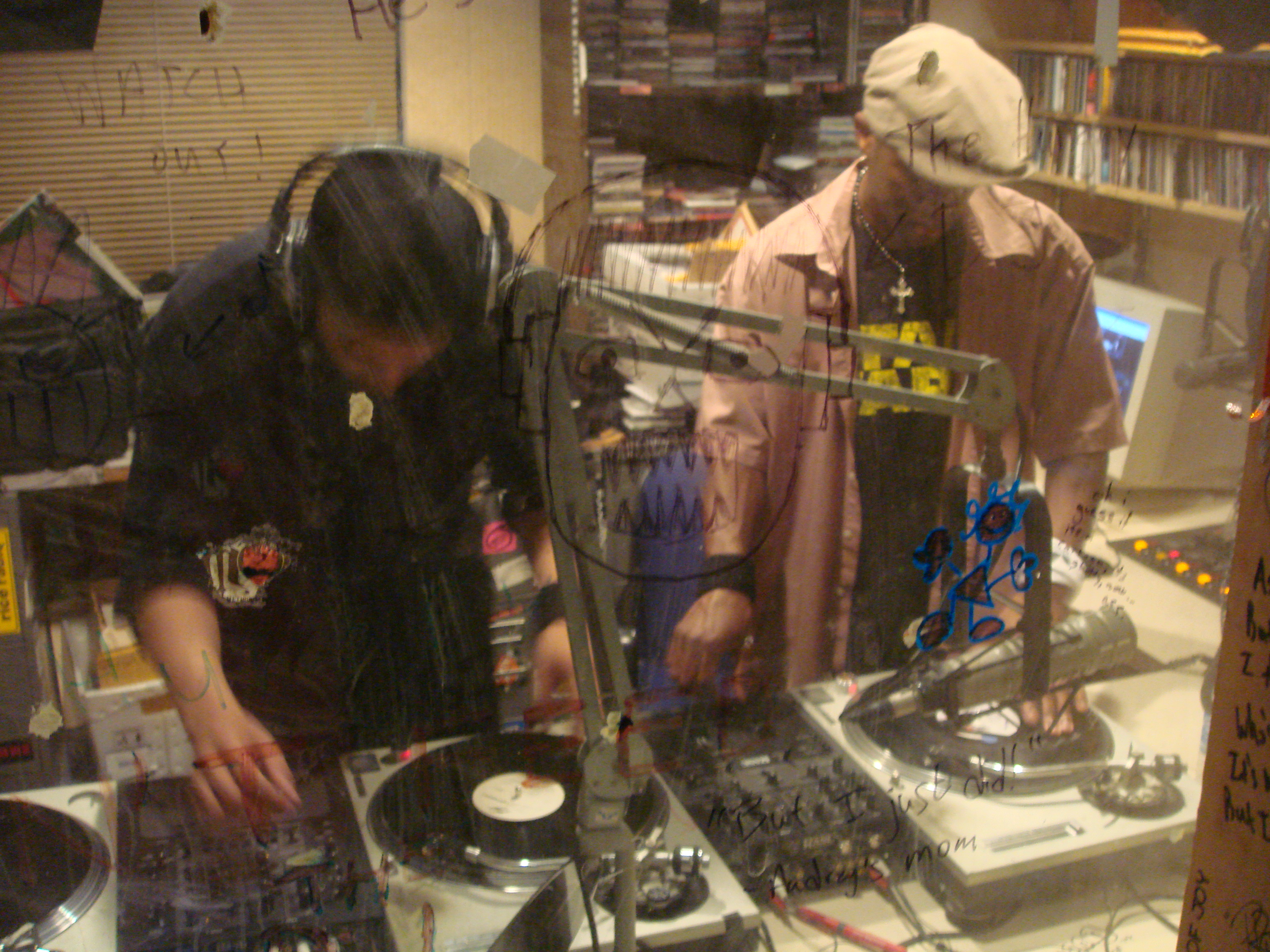
Two DJs work the turntables and mixer

His method of playing breaks was extremely crude, however. Herc would just estimate where the break was as he tried to extend it. Often, he would have to talk over the transition as the breaks did not match up. It was DJs like Grand Wizzard Theodore, Jazzy Jay, and Grandmaster Flash who perfected the trick. They developed a technique known as needle dropping by precisely cuing up the breaks in headphones in order to create a perfect transition between the two phonographs. As the first break finished, they would crossfade to the second turntable which was cued up at the beginning of the break. While the second record played, they would spin the first record backwards to the beginning of the break and crossfade into it when the second break was over. This method allowed a break to be prolonged indefinitely. These extended breaks became known as a "breakbeat". When a playing record is reversed, the sound is distorted. The effect became trendy and eventually evolved into the hip-hop technique known as "scratching".

=== Block parties ===
Outside of the dance clubs, the biggest incubator of hip-hop was the block party. DJs would hook their sound systems up to the street lights. One prominent host of these parties in the early 1970s was Disco King Mario. As a leader of the Black Spades from the Bronxdale Houses, Mario relied on the gang to protect his events.

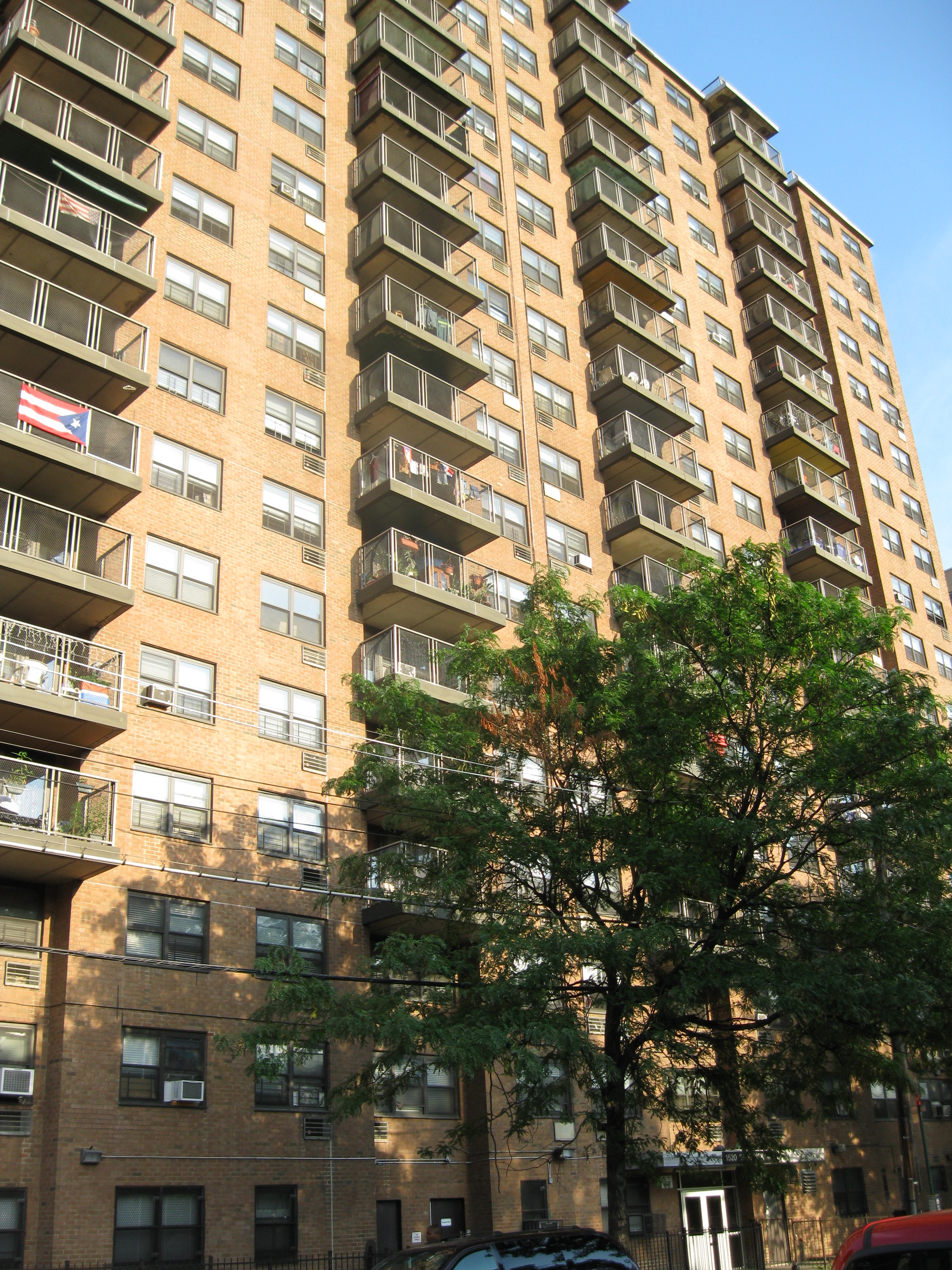
1520 Sedgwick Avenue in the Bronx, site of Cindy Campbell's party

Kool Herc first began extending breaks at a back-to-school rent party his sister Cindy Campbell hosted in the recreation room of their building at 1520 Sedgwick Avenue on the southwest side of the Bronx. The date of the party, August 11, 1973, has been aggressively marketed as the "Birth of Hip-Hop". The Campbells emigrated from Jamaica when Herc was 12. Herc himself denies there being any direct connections between the Jamaican music scene and his work, stating that, even in Jamaica, his biggest influences came from American music and artists such as James Brown, whom he says hip-hop originates from. However, his sister Cyndi Campbell wants others to acknowledge the contributions that people of Jamaican heritage have made to hip-hop over the years.

Kool Herc's style attracted a following that outgrew the rec room, and he joined the thriving block party scene. These parties were an outlet for teenagers, where "instead of getting into trouble on the streets, teens now had a place to expend their pent-up energy." Tony Tone, a member of the Cold Crush Brothers, stated that "hip hop saved a lot of lives". For inner-city youth, participating in hip-hop culture became a way of dealing with the hardships of life as minorities within America, and an outlet to deal with the risk of violence and the rise of gang culture. MC Kid Lucky mentions that "people used to break-dance against each other instead of fighting". A 1977 documentary film, Simpson Street, includes a hip-hop party on the roof of Casita Maria in the Bronx, with Grandmaster Flash in attendance; this is the earliest known film footage of the hip-hop scene.

A typical hip-hop event was a triple bill featuring the DJ, MC, and breakdancers. Graffiti artists would decorate the stage and design flyers and posters. Much of the graffiti, rapping, and b-boying at these parties were artistic variations on the one-upmanship of street gangs. Sensing that gang members' often violent urges could be turned into creative ones, Afrika Bambaataa founded the Zulu Nation, a loose confederation of street-dance crews, graffiti artists, and rap musicians. Rock Steady Crew were a group of breakdancers which included members from Puerto Rico.

During the New York City blackout of 1977, DJ equipment was heavily looted due to the popularity of the emerging genre. Kool Herc recalls, "The next day there were a thousand new D.J.'s." By 1978, Billboard magazine was taking notice of the popularity of "B-beats" in the Bronx.

=== Rapping ===
Hip-Hop evolved without rap as a requirement of the genre, but the two terms became functionally synonymous. Hip-hop DJs continued the disco DJ practice of intermittently rapping with the crowd. As their duties became more complex, a Master of ceremonies (MC) was often present to introduce the DJ and hype the crowd.

Kool Herc found Jamaican toasts did not resonate with dancers. He and Coke La Rock developed an influential rapping style over their funk breaks. MCs relied on call and response chants and eventually developed more sophisticated routines. As with other practitioners of hip-hop, MCs strove to set themselves apart with their creativity and competitiveness.

Just as many of the best breakdancers were women, the birth of hip-hop included female rappers like the Funky 4 + 1's MC Sha-Rock. Mercedes Ladies, formed in the Bronx in 1976, were the first all-female group with a DJ. Sugar Hill Records signed The Sequence, a trio that included Angie Stone. Their single "Funk You Up" was the first hip-hop hit by an all-female group.

Often these were collaborations between former gangs, such as Afrikaa Bambaataa's Universal Zulu Nation—now an international organization. Melle Mel, a rapper with the Furious Five is often credited with being the first rap lyricist to call himself an "MC".

Although there were some early MCs that recorded solo projects of note, such as DJ Hollywood, Kurtis Blow, and Spoonie Gee, the frequency of solo artists did not increase until later with the rise of soloists with stage presence and drama, such as LL Cool J. Most early hip-hop was dominated by groups where collaboration between the members was integral to the show. The first hip-hop artist to appear on national television were the group Funky 4 + 1, who appeared on Saturday Night Live in 1981.

=== Early recordings ===
Hip-hop was a live music genre for its first several years. By 1977, bootleg tapes made from the soundboards of hip-hop DJs were being circulated beyond New York City. The first dub recording, also known as a "mixed plate", was released by DJ Disco Wiz and Grandmaster Caz.

== 1979–1983: End of old-school ==
=== First commercial recordings ===
The period from 1973 to 1983 is referred to as "old-school hip-hop". Towards the end of this period, the genre began rising in popularity. In March 1979, Fatback Band released "You're My Candy Sweet" as a single. The B-side was called "King Tim III (Personality Jock)", and it is generally considered the first commercially released rap song.

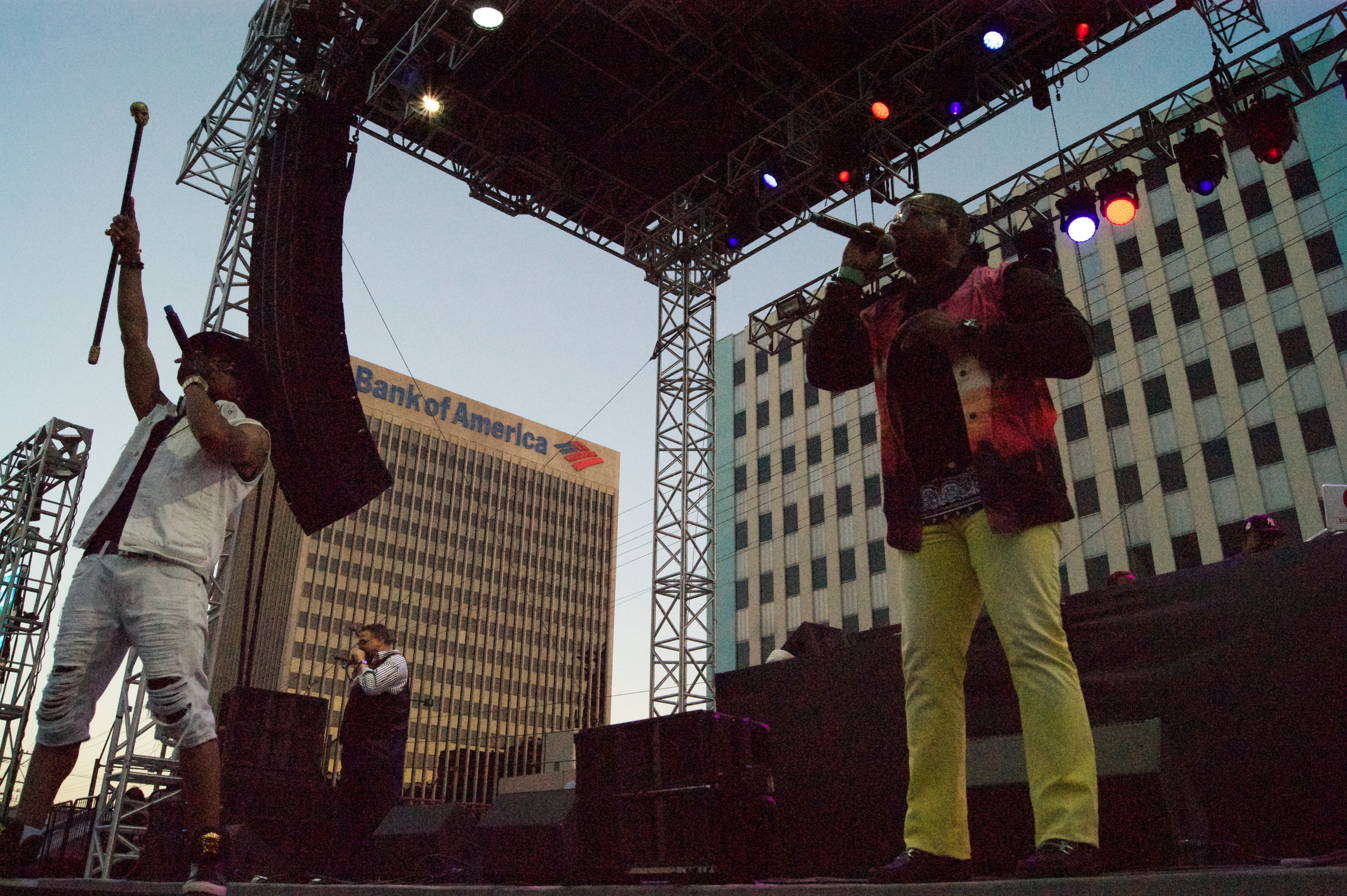
The Sugarhill Gang, 2016

Three months later, Chic released "Good Times". It became a number one single on August 18. The track quickly became a favorite for rappers. As it climbed the pop charts on August 2, Sylvia Robinson, the singer and owner of Sugar Hill Records, hired a band to recreate "Good Times" in the studio. Looking to cash in on the hip-hop trend, Robinson assembled The Sugarhill Gang to rap over the instrumental. They recycled phrases from other rappers like The Cold Crush Brothers. The track, released as "Rapper's Delight", was a Top 40 single, and what had become passé in the Bronx exploded in popularity around the country. The arrival of mainstream hip-hop recordings has been described as "The First Death of Hip-Hop".

Another early rap record, from an artist in the disco scene, was Joe Bataan's 1979 track "Rap-O Clap-O." Bataan had already achieved popularity within the Latin community thanks to his unique blend of boogaloo, salsa, and soul, and the song became a hit in Europe.

One of the composers of "Good Times", Nile Rodgers had been exposed to hip-hop in 1978 when Debbie Harry and Chris Stein from Blondie took him to a show. Rodgers and his co-writer Bernard Edwards sued Sugar Hill Records for copyright infringement and won songwriting credit on "Rapper's Delight".

In 1971, one city councilman had dubbed Philadelphia "The Graffiti Capital of the World". It was one of the first hip-hop centers outside of New York, and by 1979, hip-hop recordings such as Jocko Henderson's "Rhythm Talk" and Lady B's "To the Beat, Y'all" were emerging from the city.

Mercury Records was the first major label to sign a rapper. In 1979, they released Kurtis Blow's "Christmas Rappin'" which sold 400,000 copies. The song peaked at number 30 on the UK singles chart on December 15 that year and went on to become a holiday classic. In 1980, Blow's "The Breaks" (1980) was the first hip-hop single certified gold.

=== Diversification of styles ===
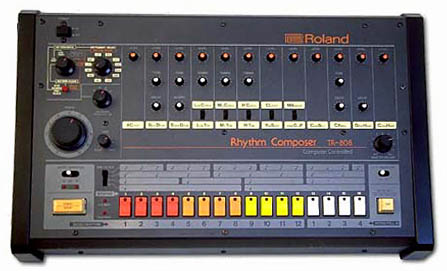
The Roland TR-808 Rhythm Composer

As hip-hop became mainstream, it also grew vastly eclectic. Part of this evolution was enabled by technology. The 1980s saw the miniaturization of recording technology, making samplers, synthesizers, and drum machines affordable. Devices like the Akai MPC 2000, Linn 9000, and Roland TR-808 drum machine became beloved tools for hip-hop creators.

In 1980, the Roland Corporation launched the TR-808 Rhythm Composer. It was one of the earliest programmable drum machines, with which users could create their own rhythms rather than having to use preset patterns. Though it was a commercial failure, over the course of the decade the 808 attracted a cult following among underground musicians for its affordability on the used market, ease of use, and idiosyncratic sounds, particularly its deep, "booming" bass drum. Popularized by hits like Marvin Gaye's "Sexual Healing", it became a cornerstone of the emerging electronic, dance, and hip-hop genres. The 808 was eventually used on more hit records than any other drum machine. Its popularity with hip-hop in particular has made it one of the most influential inventions in popular music, comparable to the Fender Stratocaster's influence on rock.

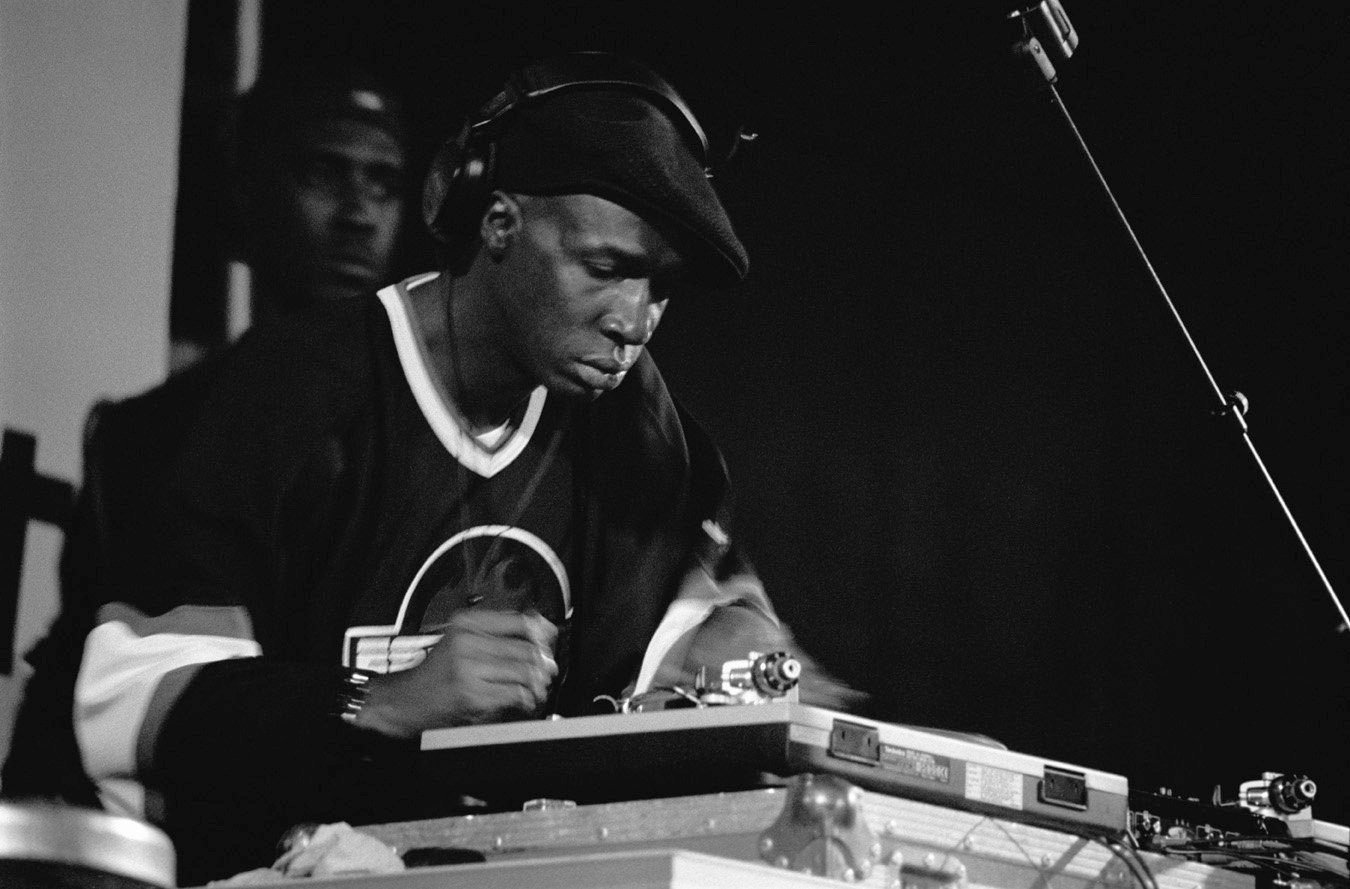
Grandmaster Flash

Grandmaster Flash's "The Adventures of Grandmaster Flash on the Wheels of Steel" (1981) typified the diversification of hip-hop in the new decade. The single consists entirely of sampled tracks. Hip-hop and electronic dance music were fused in songs like Afrika Bambaataa & Soulsonic Force's "Planet Rock" (1982). Bambaataa was inspired by Ryuichi Sakamoto's "Riot in Lagos". He incorporated elements from Kraftwerk's "Trans-Europe Express" and "Numbers". "Planet Rock" helped spawn electro music, which included songs like Planet Patrol's "Play at Your Own Risk" (1982), and C Bank's "One More Shot" (1982). This fusion would often overlap with Afrofuturism in songs like "Nunk" and "Light Years Away" by Warp 9. Electro helped spread hip-hop beyond America, when UK DJs like Greg Wilson started spinning records like "Planet Rock", Extra T's "ET Boogie", and Man Parrish's "Hip Hop, Be Bop (Don't Stop)".

As rap matured, metaphorical lyrics about a wider range of subjects moved the style beyond the boasts and chants of old school. The influential single "The Message" (1982) by Grandmaster Flash and the Furious Five, with its focus on the misery in housing projects, was a pioneering force for politically conscious rap. Hip-hop continued in the tradition of rock and roll by outraging conservatives who feared romanticizing violence and law-breaking.

Independent record labels like Tommy Boy, Prism Records and Profile Records became successful in the early 1980s, releasing records at a furious pace in response to the demand generated by local radio stations and club DJs. Producers like Arthur Baker, John Robie, Lotti Golden and Richard Scher pushed the genre in new directions. Some rappers eventually became mainstream pop performers. The 1981 songs "Rapture" by Blondie and "Christmas Wrapping" by the new wave band the Waitresses were among the first pop songs to use rap.

Breakdancing remained the vanguard of hip-hop worldwide. Breakdance crews like Black Noise and Prophets of Da City in South Africa helped spread the genre. They recognized the connections in the African diaspora between practices like breakdancing and capoeira. Musician and presenter Sidney became France's first black TV presenter with his 1984 show H.I.P. H.O.P. on TF1. Radio Nova helped launch other French hip-hop stars including Dee Nasty. Along with his radio show, his Rapattitude compilations and 1984 album Paname City Rappin' popularized hip-hop in the country. By 1982, hip-hop had reached Japan, as DJs like Hiroshi Fujiwara had begun playing hip-hop records in Tokyo's nightclubs.

== 1983–1986: Rise of the new-school ==
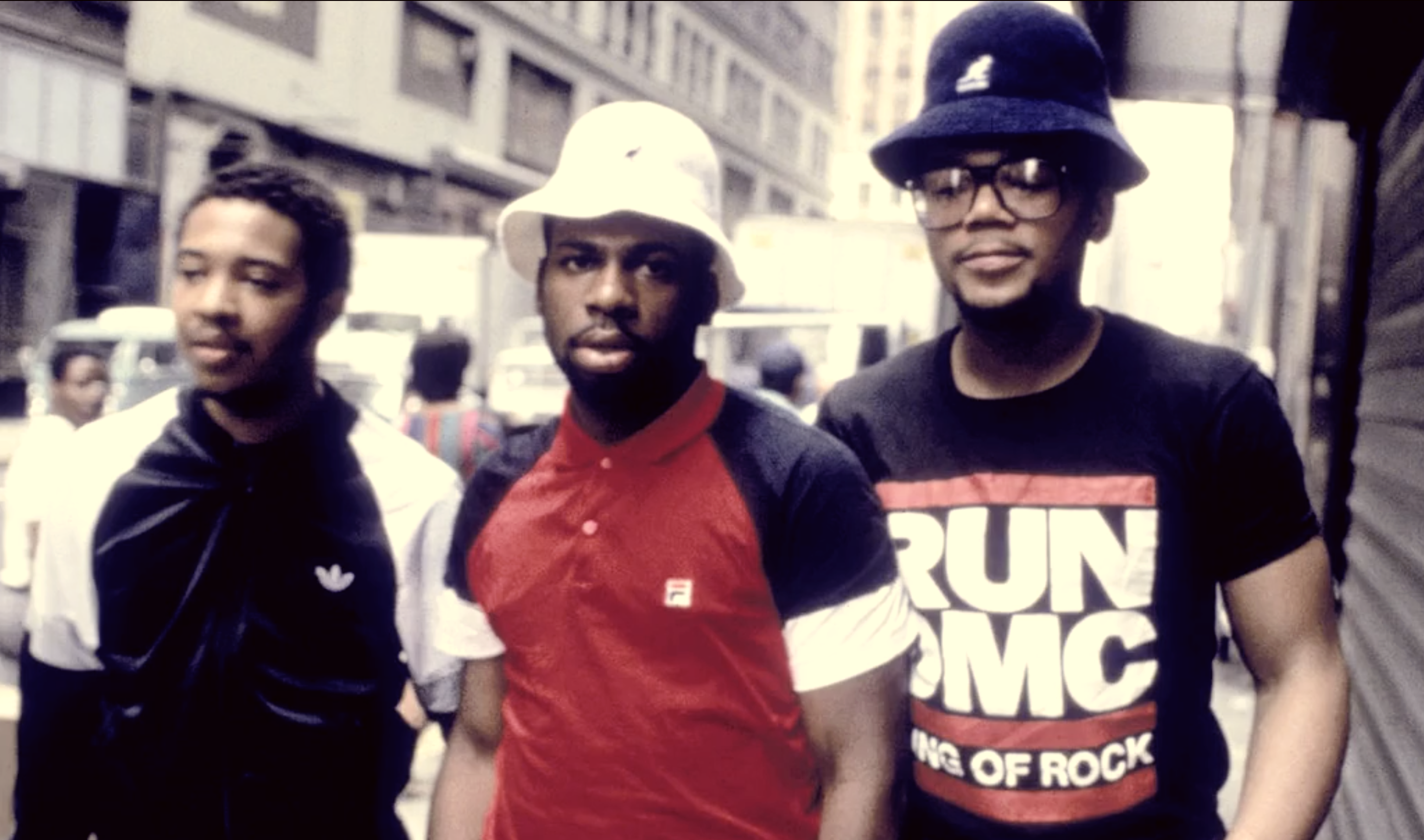
Run-DMC, from left: Joseph "Run" Simmons, Jason "Jam Master Jay" Mizell, and Darryl "D.M.C." McDaniels

The second wave of hip-hop began around 1983–4 and became known as new school. New York artists like Run-DMC and LL Cool J typified new school, with more aggressive boasting and taunting than that of the old school. Drum machine minimalism was typical for the new school, in contrast to old school's funk and disco breaks. New-school artists also made shorter, radio-friendly songs and more cohesive LP albums that became fixtures of mainstream music.

Run-DMC's third album, Raising Hell, was the first in the genre to be certified platinum on July 15, 1986. It also featured the massive hit collaboration with Aerosmith on "Walk This Way". The same year, rap notched its first No. 1 album with Beastie Boys' Licensed to Ill. Rap was getting so marketable that it was being used in national advertising. Sprite hired Kurtis Blow to appear in one of their commercials in 1986. Other soft drink companies would soon follow.

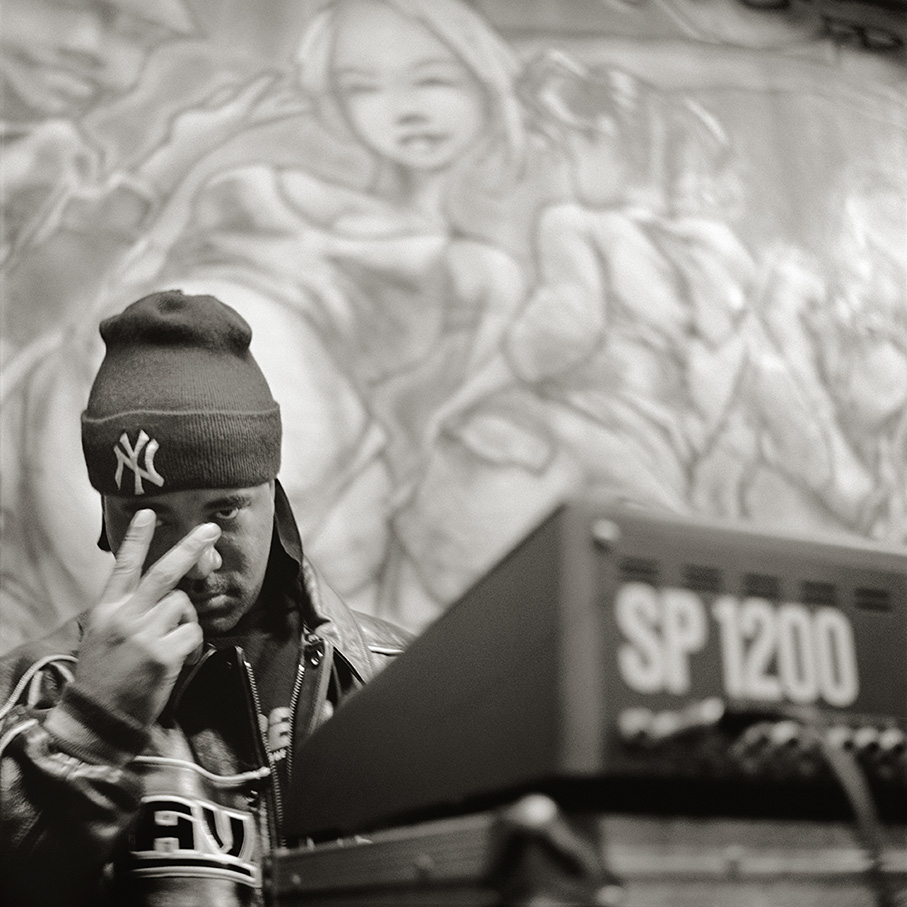
Marley Marl

New school rappers often established themselves by simultaneously honoring and battling their old school forebearers. LL Cool J relished sparring with Kool Moe Dee. The feud boosted sales for both artists. The cover of Kool Moe Dee's 1987 album, How Ya Like Me Now, featured LL Cool J's Kangol hat under the wheel of Moe Dee's Jeep Wrangler. LL's response was the vicious B-side "Jack the Ripper".

Samplers like the AKAI S900 and E-mu SP-1200 empowered creativity through greater processing power. Breakbeats were no longer reliant on a DJ and two turntables. They could be made in seconds with a sampler. Marley Marl used samples in combination with drum machines to create more variegated grooves.

== 1986–1997: Golden age ==
=== Innovation and artistry ===
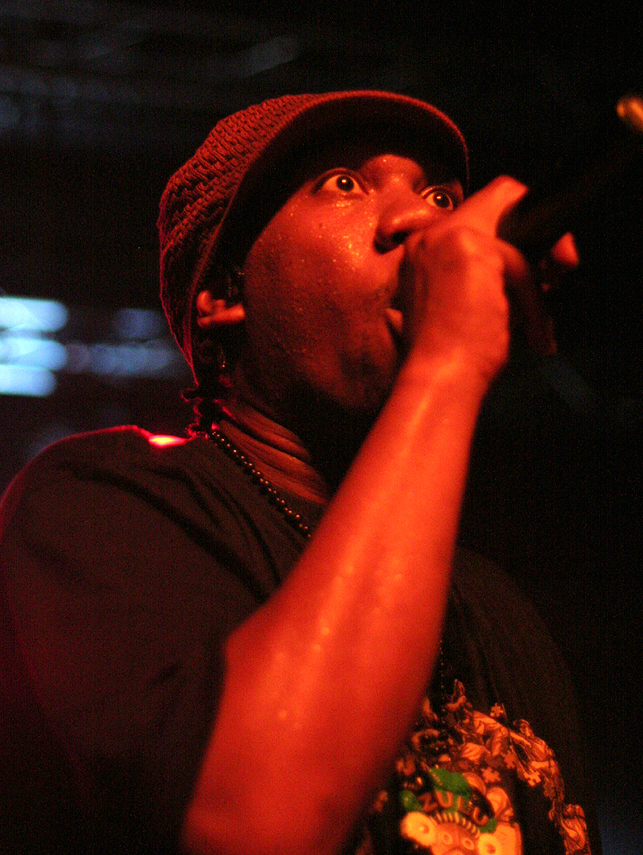
KRS-One

The period after hip-hop became mainstream in 1986 until the mid-1990s is considered its "golden age". The era is marked by increased diversity and innovation and the vast expansion of hip-hop's influence. Rolling Stone described the fecund era as one where "it seemed that every new single reinvented the genre".

There were strong themes of Afrocentrism and political militancy in golden age hip-hop lyrics. The music was experimental and the sampling drew on eclectic sources. There was often a strong jazz influence in the music. Notable golden age artists include Public Enemy, KRS-One, Boogie Down Productions, Eric B. & Rakim, Brand Nubian, De La Soul, A Tribe Called Quest, Gang Starr, Big Daddy Kane, Digable Planets, and the Jungle Brothers.

Albums became an important artistic marker during this period. 1987 alone produced landmark albums like Boogie Down Productions' Criminal Minded, Public Enemy's Yo! Bum Rush the Show, and Eric B. & Rakim's Paid in Full. The sustained artistic statement of an album became the genre's measuring stick. In 1989, 19-year-old Queen Latifah released her debut album All Hail the Queen, becoming one of the most notable female rappers.

=== Rise of gangsta rap ===
Gangsta rap is a subgenre of hip-hop that reflects the violent environment of inner-city American black youths. Gangsta rap commingled stories of crime and street life with political and social commentary. In 1985, Schoolly D released "P.S.K. What Does It Mean?", which is often regarded as the first gangsta rap song. His lyrics reflected the street vernacular, including the word "nigga". Ice-T's "jaw dropped" when he first heard the song, and it inspired his 1986 track "6 in the Mornin'". Boogie Down Productions Criminal Minded (1987) set a precedent by featuring guns on its cover. On their 1988 follow-up By All Means Necessary, KRS-One is holding an uzi, but the album also sees the emergence of his anti-violence persona "The Teacher".

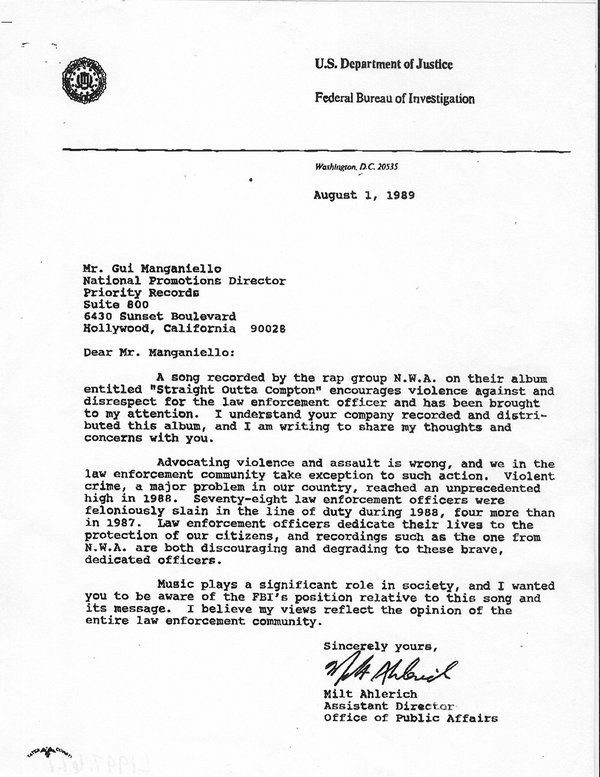
FBI letter to Priority Records about N.W.A.

N.W.A is the group most frequently associated with gangsta rap. Their lyrics were incessantly profane and more violent, sexually explicit, and openly confrontational than their peers. These lyrics were placed over rough, rock guitar-driven beats, contributing to the music's hard-edged feel. Their blockbuster 1989 album Straight Outta Compton established Los Angeles as a legitimate rival to hip-hop's capital New York City. It also sparked the first major controversy regarding hip-hop lyrics, largely due to the song "Fuck tha Police". FBI Assistant Director Milt Ahlerich wrote a letter to Priority Records lamenting the album's "discouraging and degrading" impact on law enforcement.

Ice-T encountered censorship even during his live performances, much like Jim Morrison. In reaction to Parents Music Resource Center's new "Parental Advisory" stickers, he rapped, "that sticker makes 'em sell gold." His 1992 heavy metal song "Cop Killer" prompted so much backlash that Time Warner Music balked at releasing his next hip-hop album Home Invasion.

Both U.S. presidents George H. W. Bush and Bill Clinton criticized gangsta rap. Sister Souljah argued, "The reason why rap is under attack is because it exposes all the contradictions of American culture ...What started out as an underground art form has become a vehicle to expose a lot of critical issues that are not usually discussed in...a political system that never intends to deal with inner city urban chaos".

Dr. Dre's The Chronic was released in 1992, popularizing the G-funk style of gangsta rap and being certified 3× platinum. Snoop Dogg's album Doggystyle followed in 1993, and was certified 4× platinum. Cypress Hill was formed in 1988 in the suburb of South Gate outside Los Angeles. Brothers Senen Reyes and Ulpiano Sergio (Mellow Man Ace) moved from Havana, Cuba to South Gate with their family in 1971. They teamed up with Lawrence Muggerud (DJ Muggs) and Louis Freese (B-Real), a Mexican/Cuban-American native of Los Angeles. After the departure of "Ace" to begin his solo career, the group adopted the name of Cypress Hill named after a street running through a neighborhood nearby in South Los Angeles.

=== Mainstream breakthrough ===
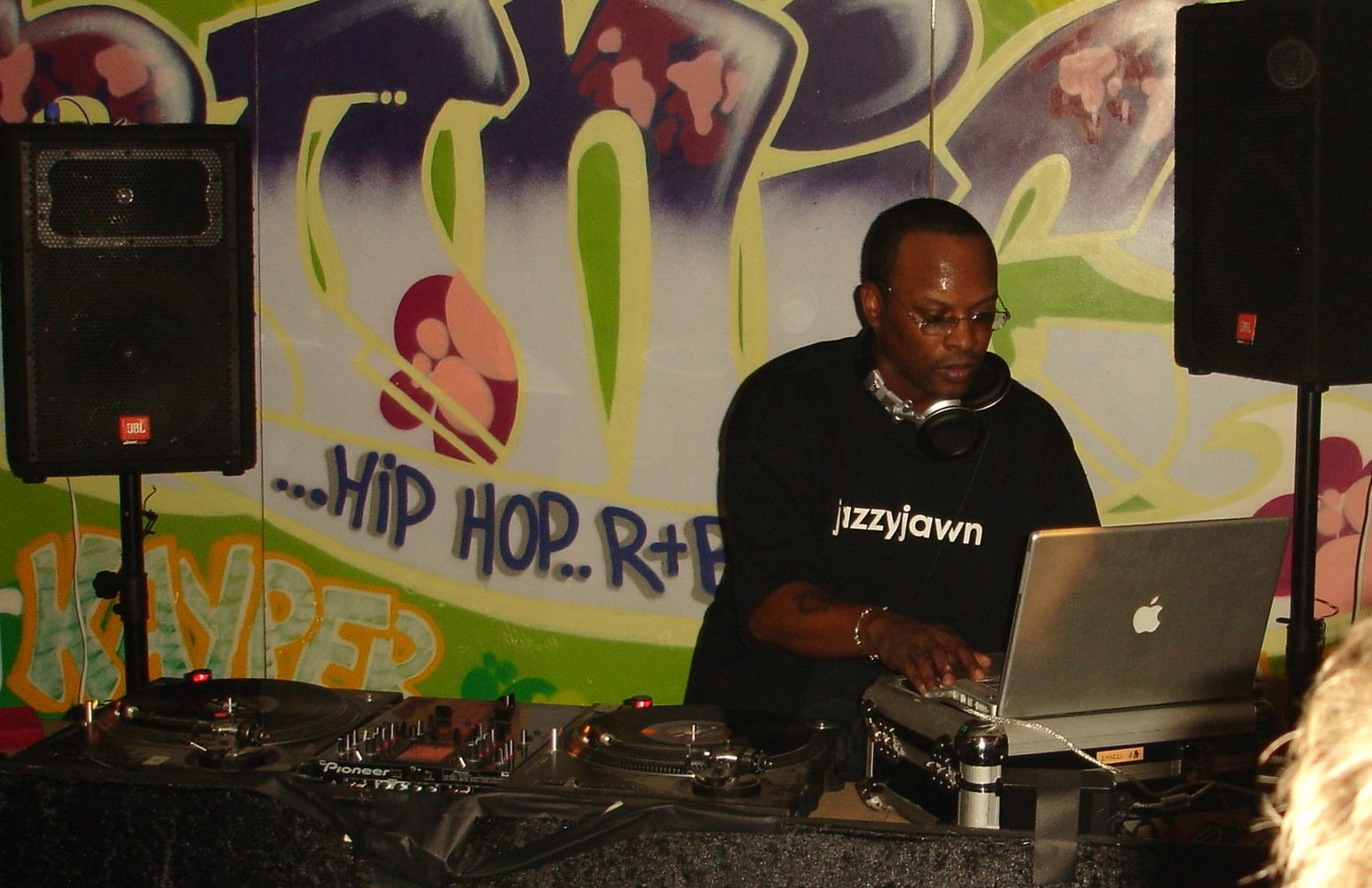
DJ Jazzy Jeff

In 1989, the National Academy of Recording Arts & Sciences decided to create a Grammy Award for Best Rap Performance. The inaugural statue was given in 1989 to DJ Jazzy Jeff & the Fresh Prince for "Parents Just Don't Understand".

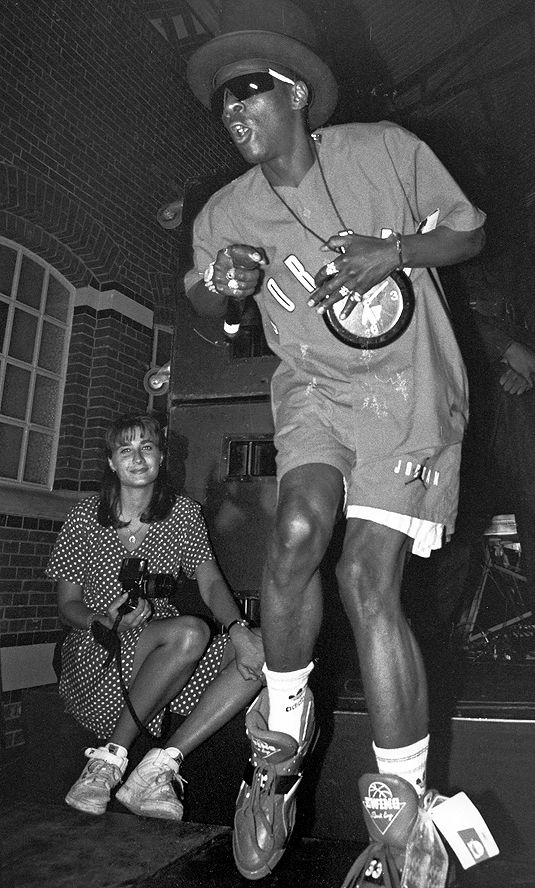
Flavor Flav of Public Enemy performing in 1991

1990 was "the year that rap exploded". Public Enemy released Fear of a Black Planet, which was a critical and commercial hit. The Los Angeles Times declared, "an explosion of energy and imagination in the late 1980s leaves rap today as arguably the most vital new street-oriented sound in pop since the birth of rock in the 1950s". Time concurred, "Rap is the rock 'n' roll of the day. Rock 'n' roll was about attitude, rebellion, a big beat, sex and, sometimes, social comment." Rap had the best-selling single of the previous year, Tone Lōc's "Wild Thing". By February 1990, nearly a third of the songs on the Billboard Hot 100 were hip-hop.

MC Hammer's third album, Please Hammer, Don't Hurt 'Em, was a monster smash. It hit number 1 on the album chart. Its lead single, "U Can't Touch This", became a global phenomenon after it was released in May 1990. It reached the Top Ten in the U.S. and number 1 in several countries. MC Hammer was one of the first rappers to become a household name. Please Hammer, Don't Hurt 'Em was the first hip-hop album certified diamond by the RIAA for sales of over ten million. By 1996, it sold 18 million units. In November, Vanilla Ice's "Ice Ice Baby" became the first hip-hop single to hit number 1 on the Billboard charts.

Dr. Dre's The Chronic was released in 1992, going triple platinum. Snoop Dogg's 1993 album Doggystyle helped the genre continue to dominate the charts, but black radio stations kept hip-hop at a distance. Russell Simmons felt, "Black radio hated rap from the start and there's still a lot of resistance to it". Despite the lack of support from some black radio stations, hip-hop became a best-selling music genre in the mid-1990s and the top-selling music genre by 1999, with 81 million CDs sold.

During the golden age, elements of hip-hop continued to be assimilated into other genres of popular music. The first waves of rap rock, rapcore, and rap metal went mainstream. Run-DMC, the Beastie Boys, and Rage Against the Machine were among the most well-known bands in these fields. New jack swing (Bobby Brown) and R&B (TLC) artists incorporated hip-hop influences in their music, while artists like the Fugees combined hip-hop with soul music to create hip-hop soul. In Hawaii, bands like Sudden Rush created the na mele paleoleo style which fused hip-hop with Hawaiian language and sovereignty issues.

=== Emergence of local scenes ===
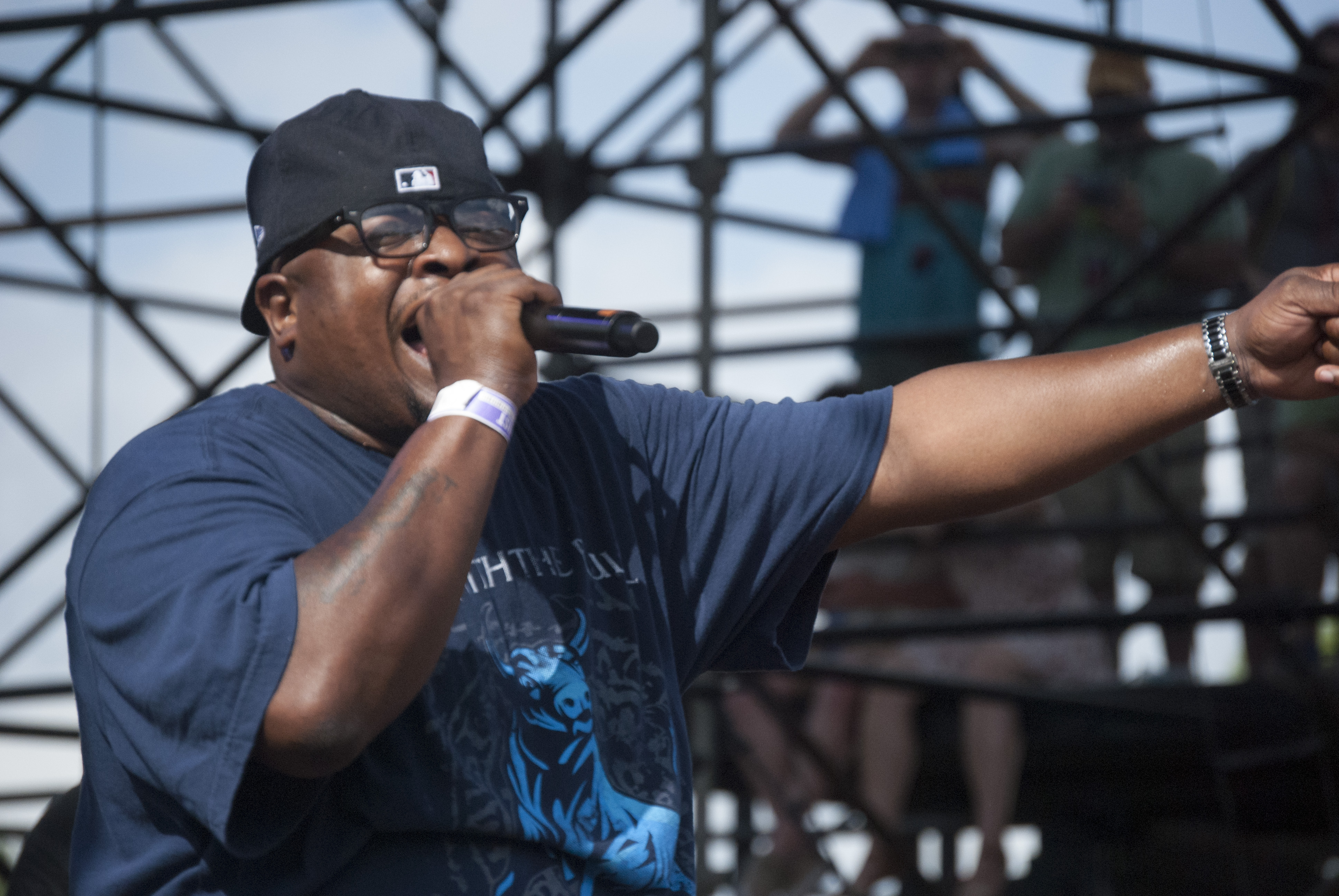
Rapper Scarface from Geto Boys

Southern rap first became popular in the early 1990s. Record labels based out of Atlanta, Memphis, and New Orleans gained fame for their local scenes. The first Southern rappers to gain national attention were the Geto Boys out of Houston, Texas. Southern rap's roots can be traced to the success of Geto Boy's early albums. The group's strongest member was Scarface who later went solo.

Atlanta hip-hop artists were key in further expanding rap music and bringing southern hip-hop into the mainstream. Releases such as Arrested Development's 3 Years, 5 Months and 2 Days in the Life Of... (1992), Goodie Mob's Soul Food (1995), and Outkast's ATLiens (1996) were all critically acclaimed. When Outkast won the Best New Rap Group at the 1995 Source Awards, it signaled a power shift in Atlanta's direction. The Midwest also had its own rap scene, in cities like Chicago, Detroit, Cleveland, and St. Louis. It was known for fast vocal styles from artists (sometimes called "choppers") such as Bone Thugs-n-Harmony, Tech N9ne, and Twista.

=== East Coast–West Coast rivalry ===
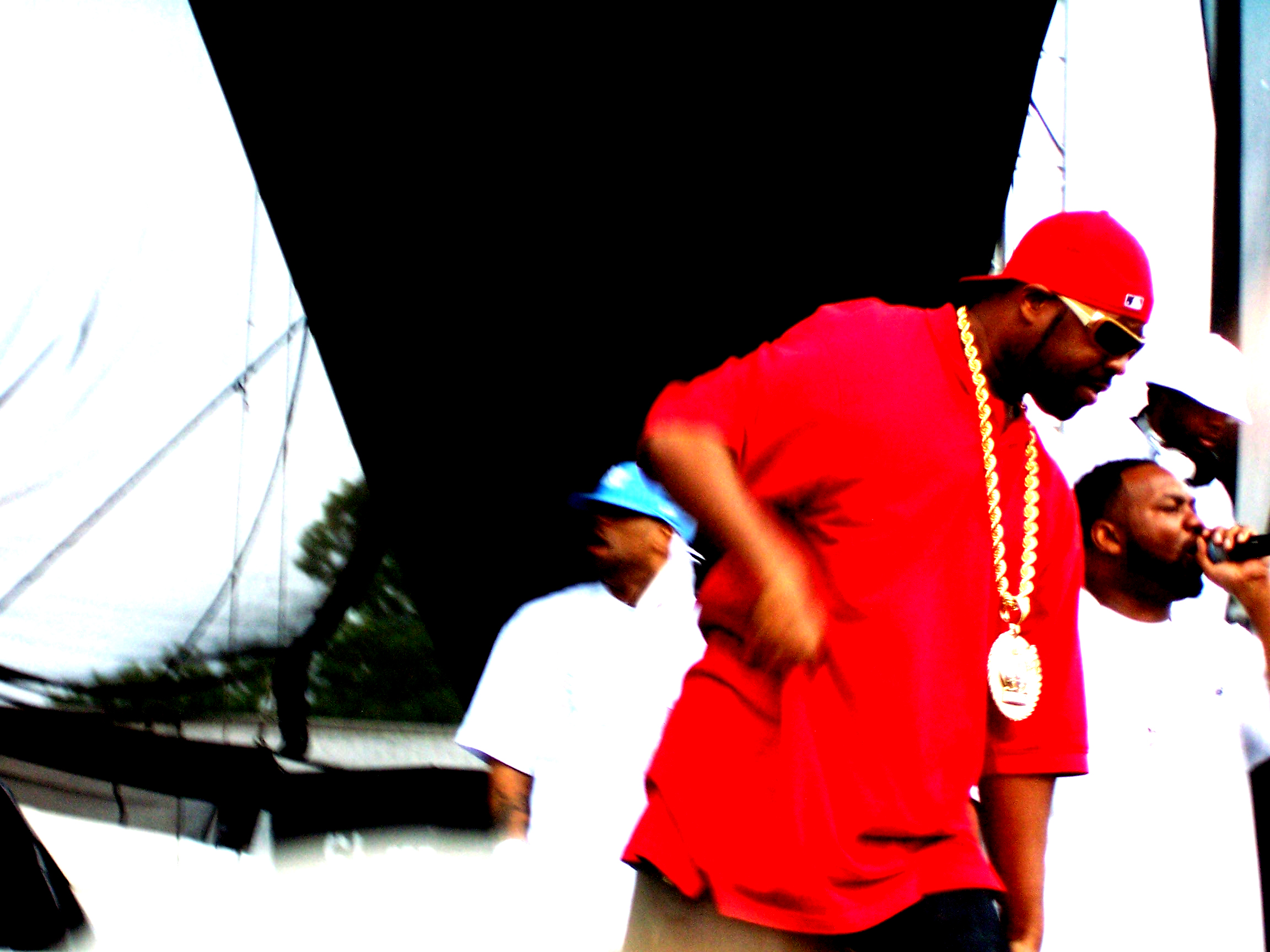
Wu-Tang Clan at the Virgin Festival in 2007

In the early 1990s, east coast hip-hop was dominated by the Native Tongues posse, which was loosely composed of De La Soul, Prince Paul, A Tribe Called Quest, the Jungle Brothers, 3rd Bass, Main Source, and Black Sheep and KMD. Although originally a "daisy age" conception stressing the positive aspects of life, darker material soon crept in. In 1993, Wu-Tang Clan's Enter the Wu-Tang (36 Chambers) pioneered a hardcore rap response to the west coast's gangsta.

New York hip-hop experienced a renaissance the following year with the release of two landmark albums: Nas' Illmatic and the Notorious B.I.G.'s Ready to Die. The 10-member Wu-Tang Clan also started creating a hip-hop universe of solo albums that served as advertisements for each other. Some of the standout titles were Raekwon's Only Built 4 Cuban Linx..., Ghostface Killah's Ironman, and GZA's Liquid Swords. RZA had a hand in producing most of their efforts, and his style became massively influential. Prominent producers during this period were DJ Premier (Gang Starr, Jeru the Damaja), Pete Rock (CL Smooth), Buckwild, Large Professor, Diamond D, and Q-Tip. Nas' Illmatic, O.C.'s Word...Life, and Jay-Z's Reasonable Doubt all relied on this talent pool.

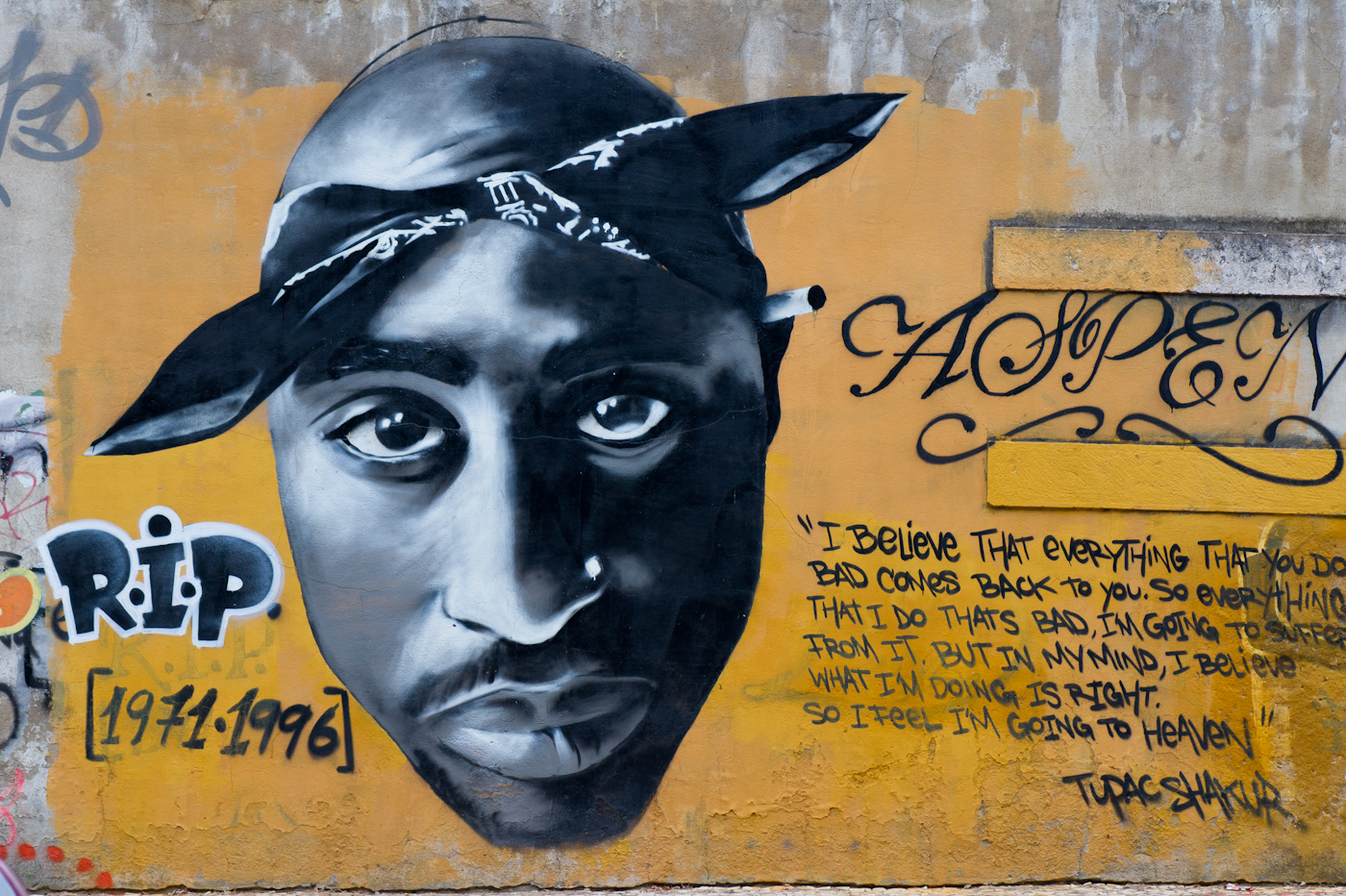
Tribute to Tupac Shakur

A lazy media narrative emerged that rappers on the coasts were feuding with each other. As Kool Moe Dee and LL Cool J had previously found, playing into a rivalry was good for sales. It became fashionable to emphasize the east coast versus west Coast beef, but it did not remain a lyrical battle. On November 30, 1994, in New York City, Tupac Shakur was shot five times. He blamed the attack on a cohort that included Sean Combs and the Notorious B.I.G.

Shakur left Interscope Records for Suge Knight and Dr. Dre's Death Row Records on the west coast. Shakur's February 1996 debut for the label, All Eyez on Me, was promoted by relentlessly highlighting his grievances with east coast personalities. The ploy was successful and led to monster sales. On September 7, 1996, Shakur was killed in Las Vegas. On March 9, 1997, the Notorious B.I.G. was killed in Los Angeles. Though the coastal feud involved dozens of people in countless imbroglios, the twin tragedies of Shakur and the Notorious B.I.G. are at the core of the episode. Their deaths are used as markers for the end of hip-hop's golden age.

== 1997–2007: Bling era ==
=== Crossover success and new directions ===
Now a mainstream genre and dominating the charts, hip-hop became commercially oriented in the late 1990s. The musical approach was typified by Sean "Puff Daddy" Combs, who ruled the 1997 charts by repurposing old hits into new ones. Diana Ross' "I'm Coming Out" became "Mo Money Mo Problems". Herb Alpert's "Rise" became "Hypnotize". The Police's "Every Breath You Take" became "I'll Be Missing You". The shiny suits he and his protege Mase wore became a signature for the period, dubbed the "shiny suit era". The same year, Will Smith's single "Gettin' Jiggy wit It" gave a catchier name for the era, the "jiggy era". In 1998, hardcore rapper DMX released his album It's Dark and Hell Is Hot, seen by some as bringing hip-hop "back to the streets".

New producers such as Swizz Beatz, Timbaland, and the Neptunes emerged in this period, creating a futuristic sound for artists like Aaliyah and Missy Elliott. During the bling era, it became commonplace to pair an R&B singer with a rapper. Either the rapper would appear in a remix of the singer's hit, or the singer would perform the hook on a rapper's song. Pairings included Ashanti and Ja Rule, Beyoncé, and Jay-Z, and Mariah Carey alongside rappers like Mystikal, Cam'ron, and Busta Rhymes.

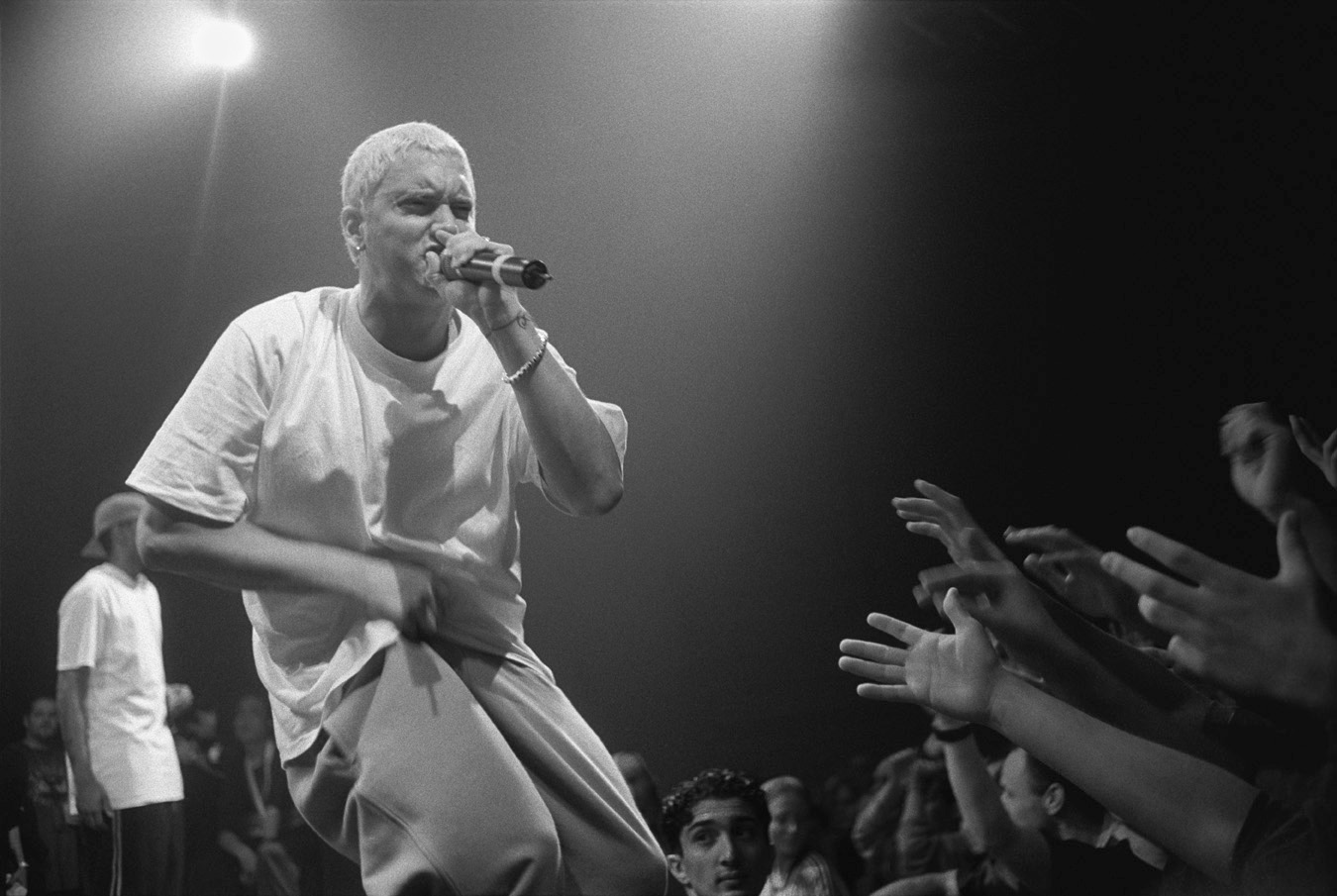
Eminem

Dr. Dre began 1999 by producing Eminem's debut The Slim Shady LP which went quadruple platinum. In November, he released his 6× platinum album 2001. Dre also produced Eminem's second album and 50 Cent's Get Rich or Die Tryin', which debuted in 2003 at number one on the U.S. Billboard 200 charts. Jay-Z became culturally dominant with his record label, clothing line, and various business interests. His albums consistently charted at number 1, and with the release of The Blueprint 3 in 2009, he broke Elvis Presley's record for most number one albums by a solo artist.

=== Rise of the South ===
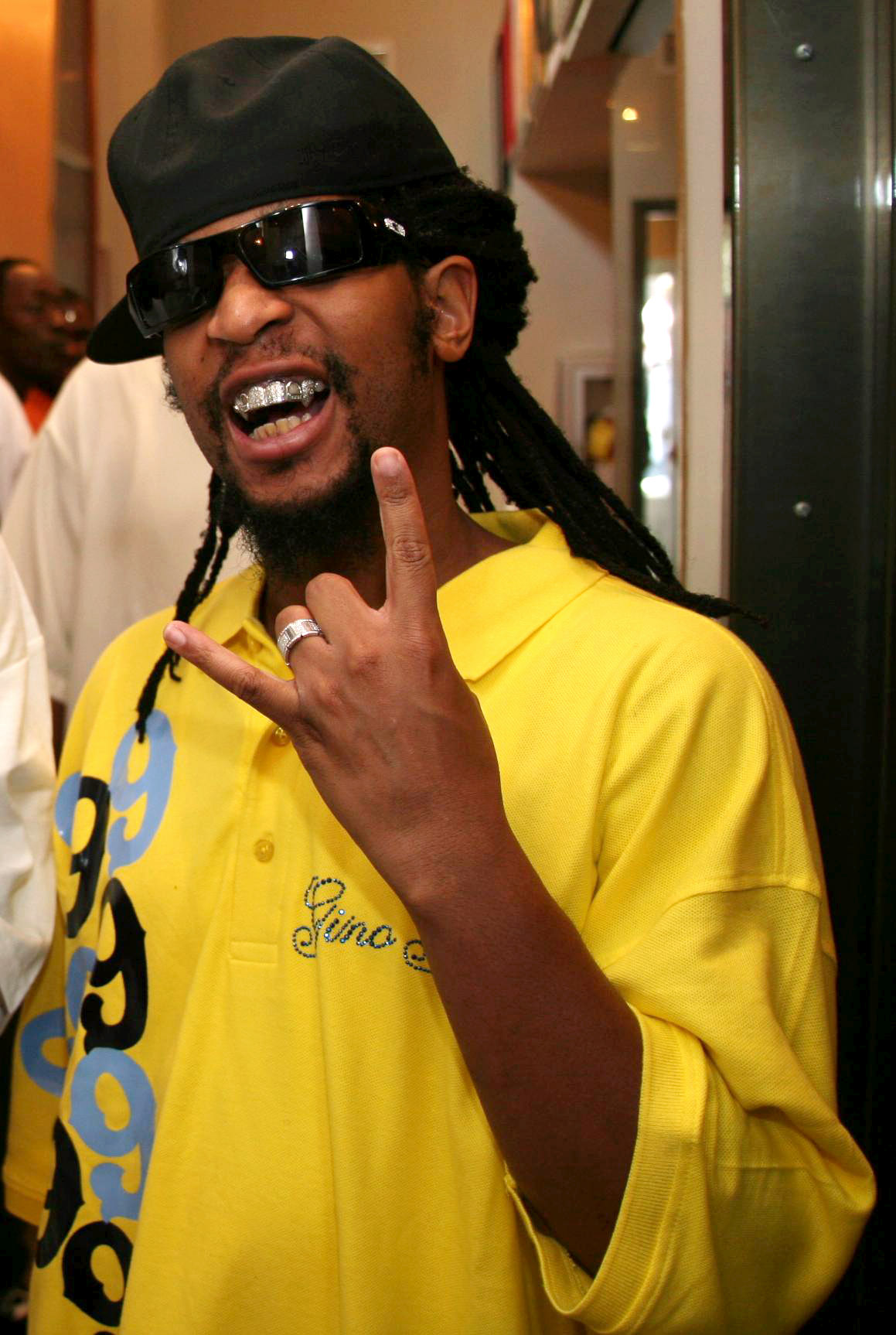
Lil Jon

In New Orleans, two upstart labels came to prominence. Master P built No Limit Records into a multimillion-dollar enterprise. Cash Money Records supercharged its sales by signing a distribution deal with Universal in 1998. Their roster included Birdman, Lil Wayne, B.G., and Juvenile. In 1999, the slick consumerism of the jiggy era was indelibly rechristened by B.G. in his song "Bling Bling". The slang resonated, and the "bling era" label stuck.

The subgenre known as crunk exploded in the early-mid 2000s when songs by Lil Jon and Ying Yang Twins became huge hits. It originated in Tennessee in the southern United States in the 1990s, influenced by Miami bass. Crunk is almost exclusively "party music", favoring call and response hip-hop slogans in lieu of more lyrical approaches. An Atlanta variant of crunk known as snap music became similarly popular in the mid-late 2000s.

=== Rise of alternative hip-hop ===
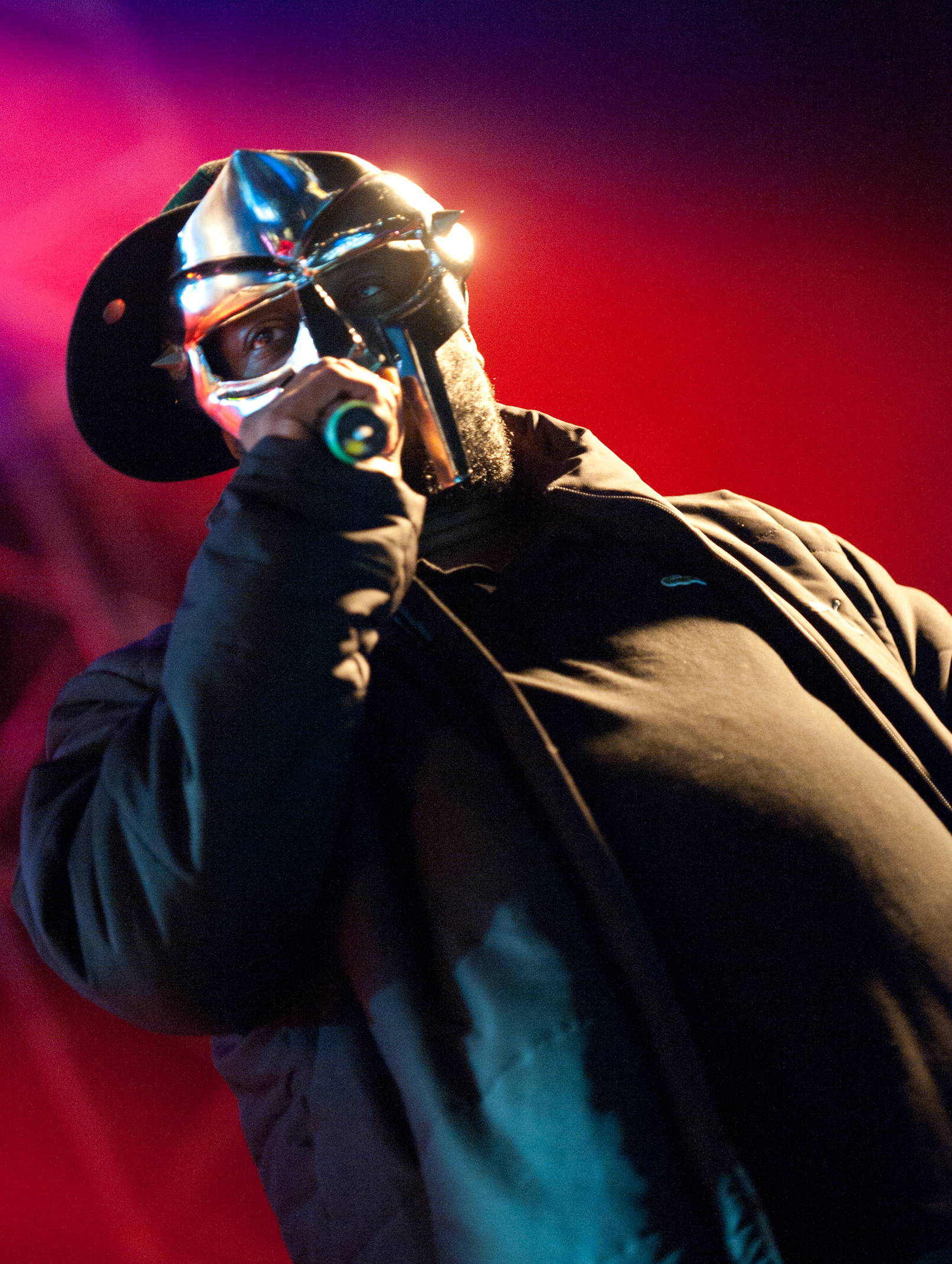
MF Doom

Alternative hip-hop artists such as MF Doom, the Roots, Mos Def, Dilated Peoples, Gnarls Barkley, and Aesop Rock began to achieve significant recognition at this time. Other alternative artists like Outkast, Kanye West, and Gnarls Barkley also began to earn mainstream sales. Outkast's 2003 album Speakerboxxx/The Love Below won Grammy Award for Album of the Year at the 46th Annual Grammy Awards and has been certified 13× platinum. West's 2004 debut album The College Dropout attracted audience and media attention, being certified 4× platinum. Its introspective lyrics contrasted to the more braggadocios sounds of rap's mainstream.

Glitch hop is a fusion genre of hip-hop and glitch music that originated in the early to mid-2000s in the United States and Europe. Musically, it is based on irregular, chaotic breakbeats, glitchy basslines and other typical sound effects used in glitch music, like skips. Glitch hop artists include Prefuse 73, Dabrye and Flying Lotus. Wonky is a subgenre of hip-hop that originated around 2008. It differs from glitch hop with more melodic material and unstable synths. Scottish artists like Hudson Mohawke and Rustie are prominent in the genre.

== 2007–2014: Blog era ==
=== Decline in sales ===
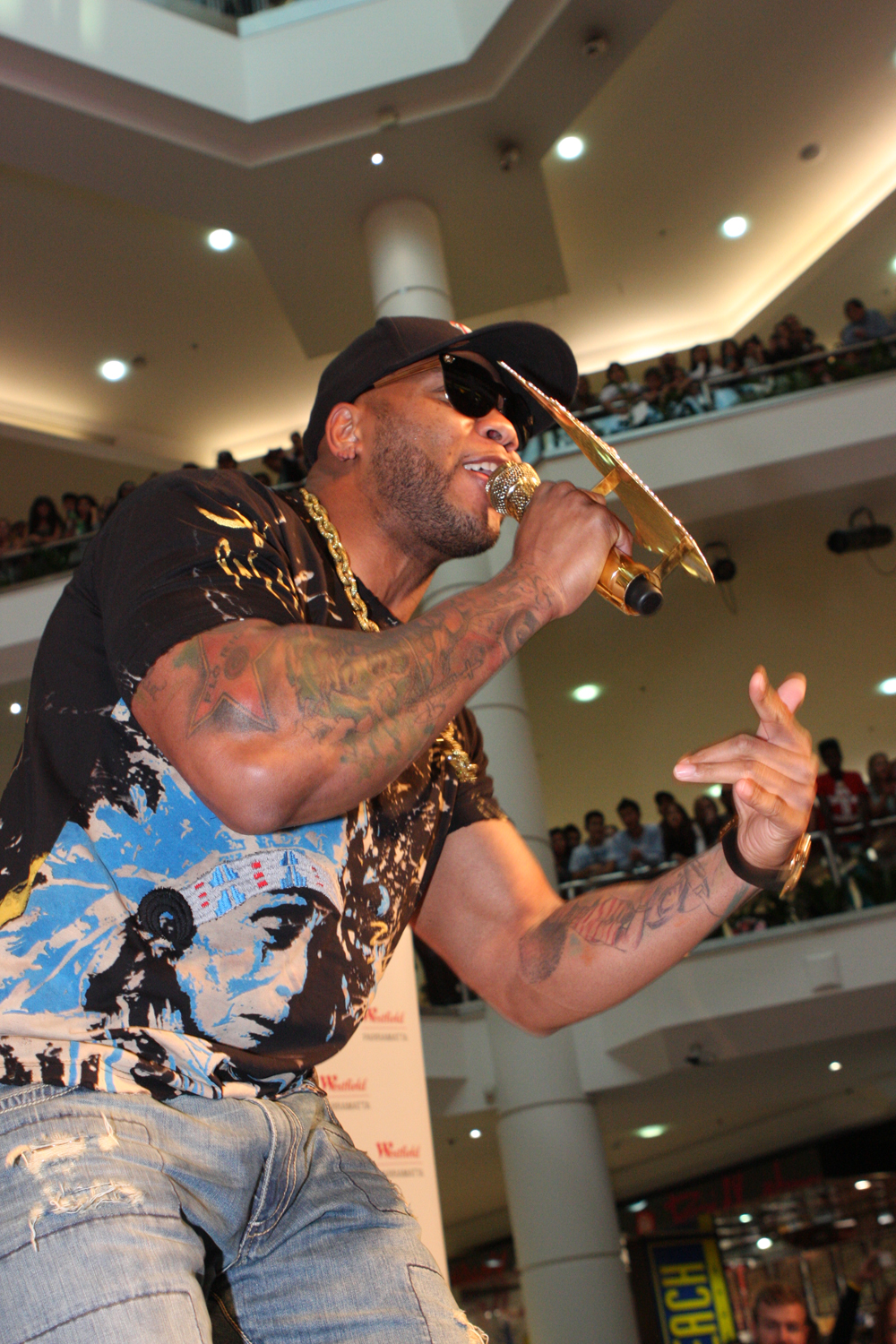
Flo Rida

Social media led to the decline of fans purchasing physical media like CDs and vinyl. Starting in 2005, hip-hop sales plummeted, prompting concerns that the genre might be dying. While all music sales declined, hip-hop's losses were greater, totaling a 21% decrease from 2005 to 2006. 2006 was the first time in five years that the top ten albums did not include hip-hop.

Peer-to-peer file sharing also wreaked havoc with record sales. Digital downloads returned singles to the forefront of music sales. Downloads of individual tracks from Flo Rida's 2009 album R.O.O.T.S. totaled in the millions, while the album itself did not even go gold.

Despite the fall in record sales throughout the music industry, hip-hop artists still regularly topped the Billboard 200 charts. In 2009, Rick Ross, Black Eyed Peas, and Fabolous all had No. 1 albums. Eminem's album Relapse was one of the fastest selling albums of 2009.

=== Revitalization and influence of the Internet ===
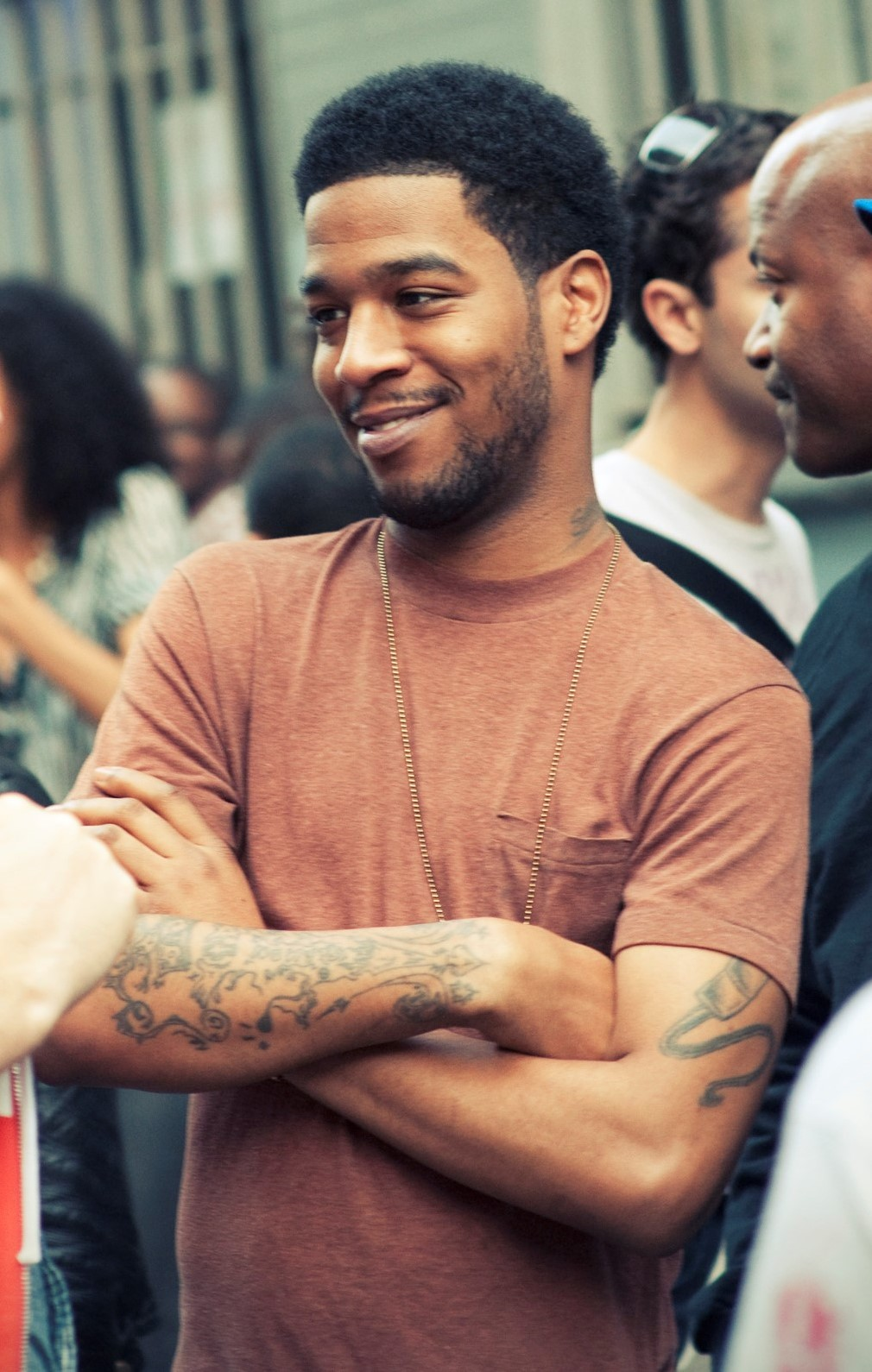
Kid Cudi

The dawn of social media in the mid-to-late 2000s began to influence the genre, as artists like Soulja Boy started uploading their music directly to sites like YouTube and MySpace. The Internet corroded music sales but democratized distribution. Audiences started to find artists directly through music blogs and social media, in what has been retroactively called the "blog era". Emerging artists like Kid Cudi, Wale, Odd Future (led by Tyler, the Creator), Mac Miller, Lil B, Kendrick Lamar, J. Cole, Lupe Fiasco, the Cool Kids, Jay Electronica, and B.o.B also possessed a sensitivity and vulnerability that had been little-explored in the bling era.

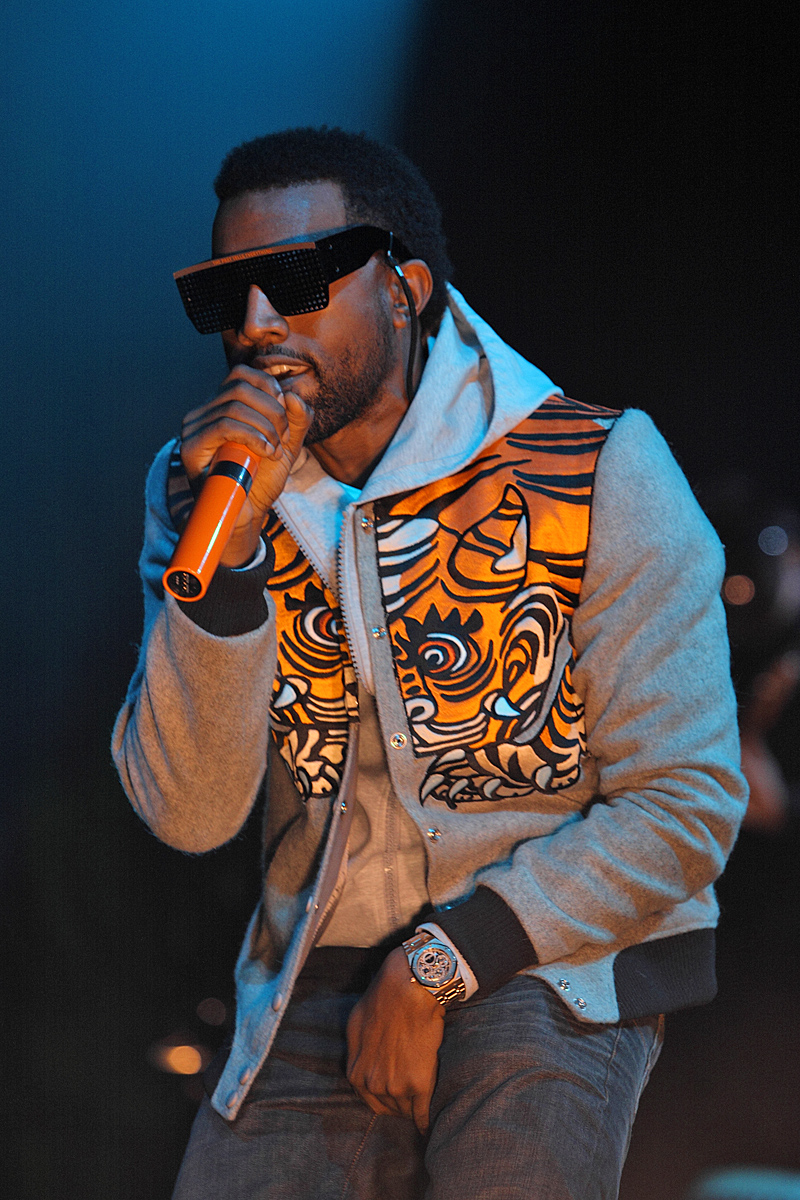
Kanye West

When Kanye West's Graduation and 50 Cent's Curtis were both released on September 11, 2007, West's idiosyncratic album sold quicker. West's next album, 808s & Heartbreak, was even quirkier and established a rush towards more creative hip-hop productions. West borrowed the Auto-Tune vocal effect that rapper T-Pain had popularized. T-Pain cites new jack swing producer Teddy Riley and funk artist Roger Troutman's use of the talk box as inspirations for his use of the technique. Even Jay-Z considered making an alternative album, inspired by indie rock artists like Grizzly Bear.

The alternative hip-hop movement was not limited only to the United States, as rappers such as Somali-Canadian poet K'naan, Japanese rapper Shing02, and Sri Lankan British artist M.I.A. achieved considerable worldwide recognition. In 2009, Time magazine placed M.I.A in the Time 100 list of "World's Most Influential people" for having "global influence across many genres." Global-themed movements have also sprung out of the international hip-hop scene with microgenres like "Islamic Eco-Rap" addressing issues of worldwide importance through traditionally disenfranchised voices.

== 2014–present: Streaming era ==
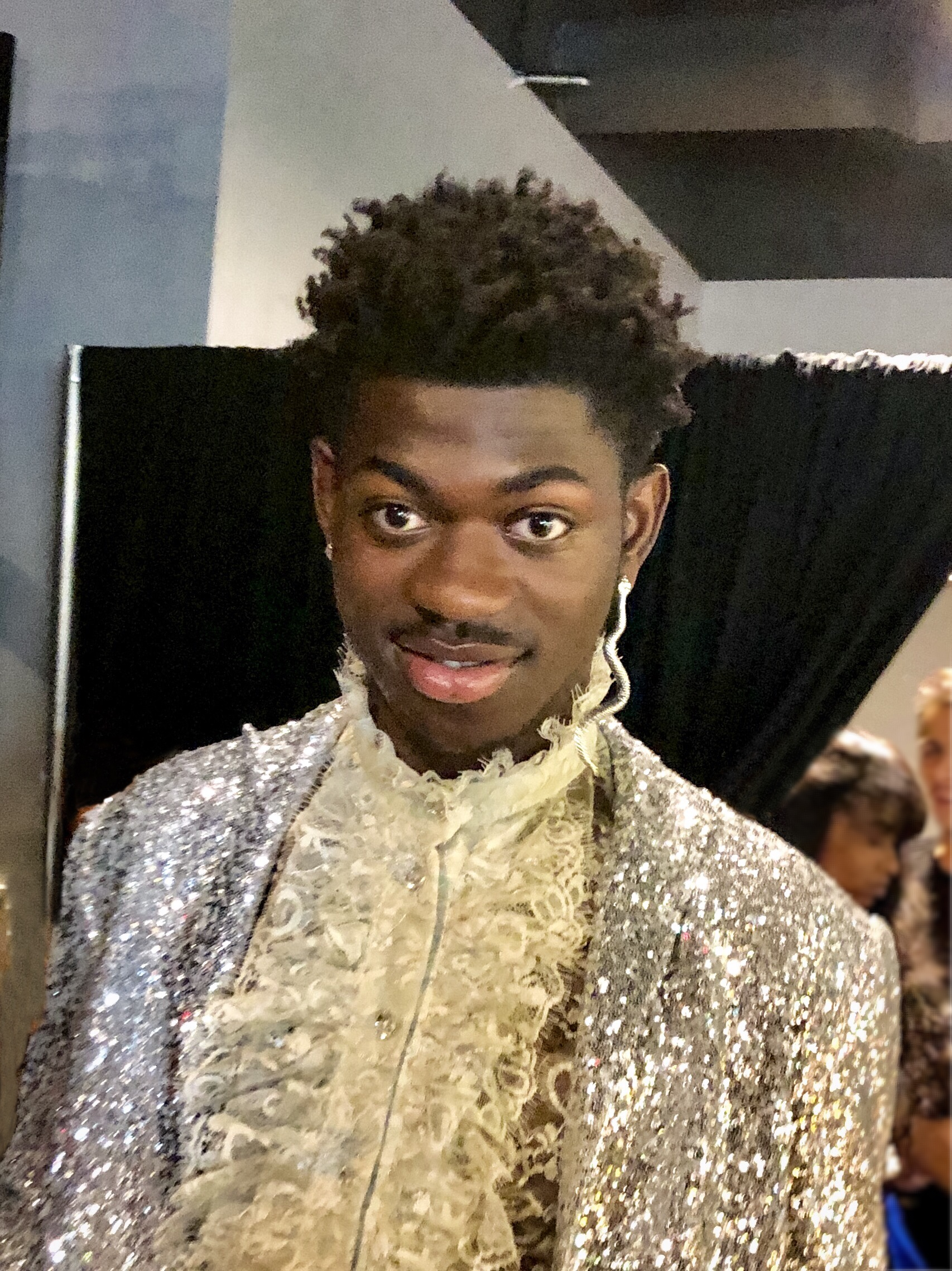
Lil Nas X

Atlanta hip-hop dominated the charts during the 2010s, particularly trap music. Trap first became a mainstream sensation in the 2000s, and started topping the charts in the mid-to-late 2010s. It is typified by double or triple-time sub-divided hi-hats, heavy kick drums from the Roland TR-808 drum machine, layered synthesizers and an overall dark, ominous or bleak atmosphere.

Major trap artists include Future, Chief Keef, Migos, Fetty Wap, Young Thug, Travis Scott, Cardi B, Megan Thee Stallion, DaBaby, and Lil Nas X. Major trap producers included Metro Boomin, Pi'erre Bourne, London on da Track, and Mike Will Made-It. Many of these artists relied on SoundCloud to freely distribute their music without a record label. Post Malone, Lil Uzi Vert, XXXTentacion, and others started their careers on SoundCloud. Some trap was dismissed as "mumble rap" because of its often garbled diction. Snoop Dogg noted that he could not tell artists apart, and Black Thought lamented trap's lack of lyricism.

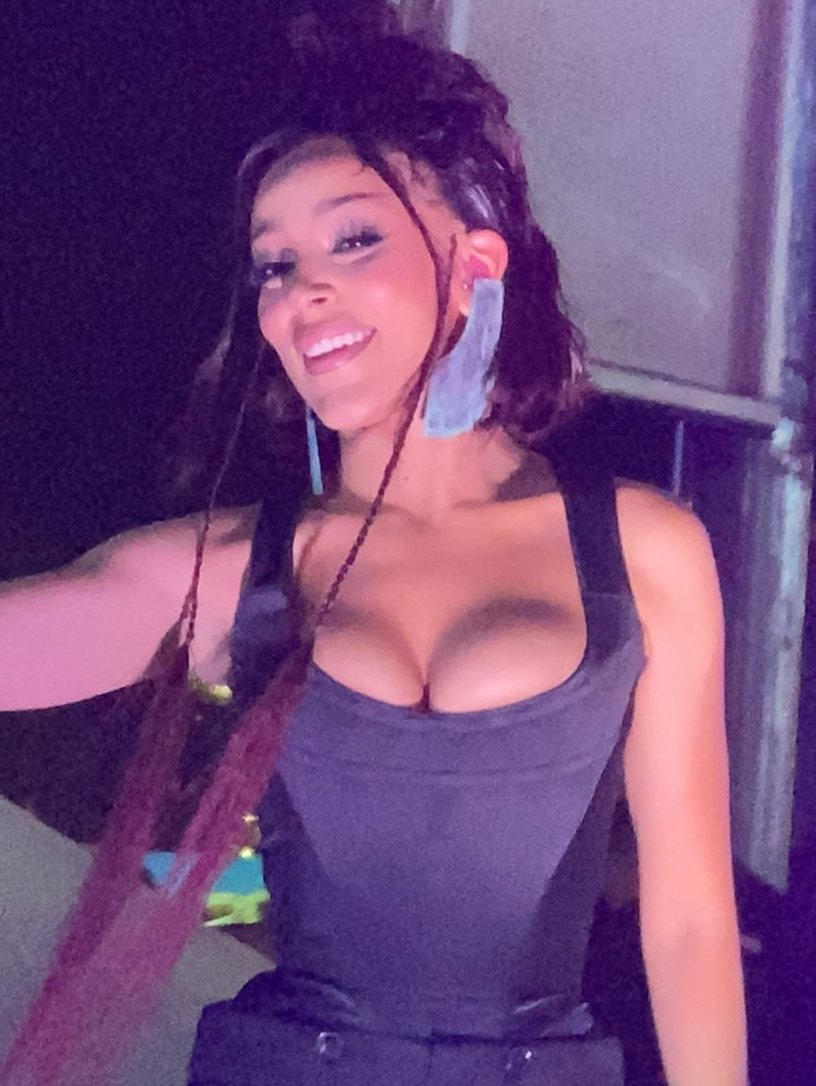
Doja Cat

Streaming platforms like Spotify and Apple Music became the dominant music distributors in the 2010s. The 2017 Grammy Award for Best Rap Album went to a streaming album for the first time, Chance the Rapper's Coloring Book. Artists like Kanye West and Drake started to eschew physical releases as well. On July 17, 2017, Forbes reported that hip-hop/R&B had usurped rock as the most consumed musical genre, becoming the most popular genre in music for the first time in U.S. history. The most streamed rap album of all-time on Spotify is XXXTentacion's second album, ? (2018).

In the 2020s, sites such as TikTok and Instagram were artists' preferred method of online distribution, with many hip-hop songs going viral. The 2020s decade began with Roddy Ricch as the first rapper to have a Billboard Hot 100 number-one entry. In 2021, Pop Smoke's posthumous album popularized Brooklyn drill. That year, the most streamed rappers were Doja Cat and Lil Nas X.

== World hip-hop music ==
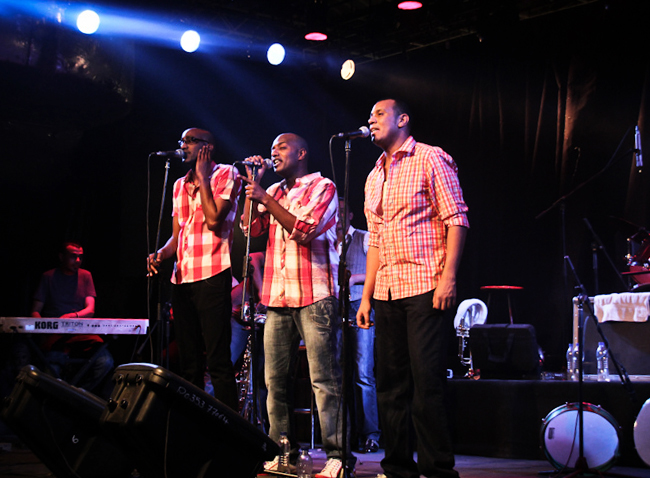
Black Theama

Hip-hop spread from the Bronx to the world, being reinvented across the planet. Many hip-hop artists worldwide acknowledge their debt to the Black and Latino people in New York who are credited with launching the global movement.

In many Latin American countries, as in the U.S., hip-hop has been a tool with which marginalized people can articulate their struggle. Cuban hip-hop grew steadily during the Special Period that came with the fall of the Soviet Union.

Brazilian hip-hop is heavily associated with racial and economic issues in the country, where a lot of Afro-Brazilians live in economically disadvantaged favelas.

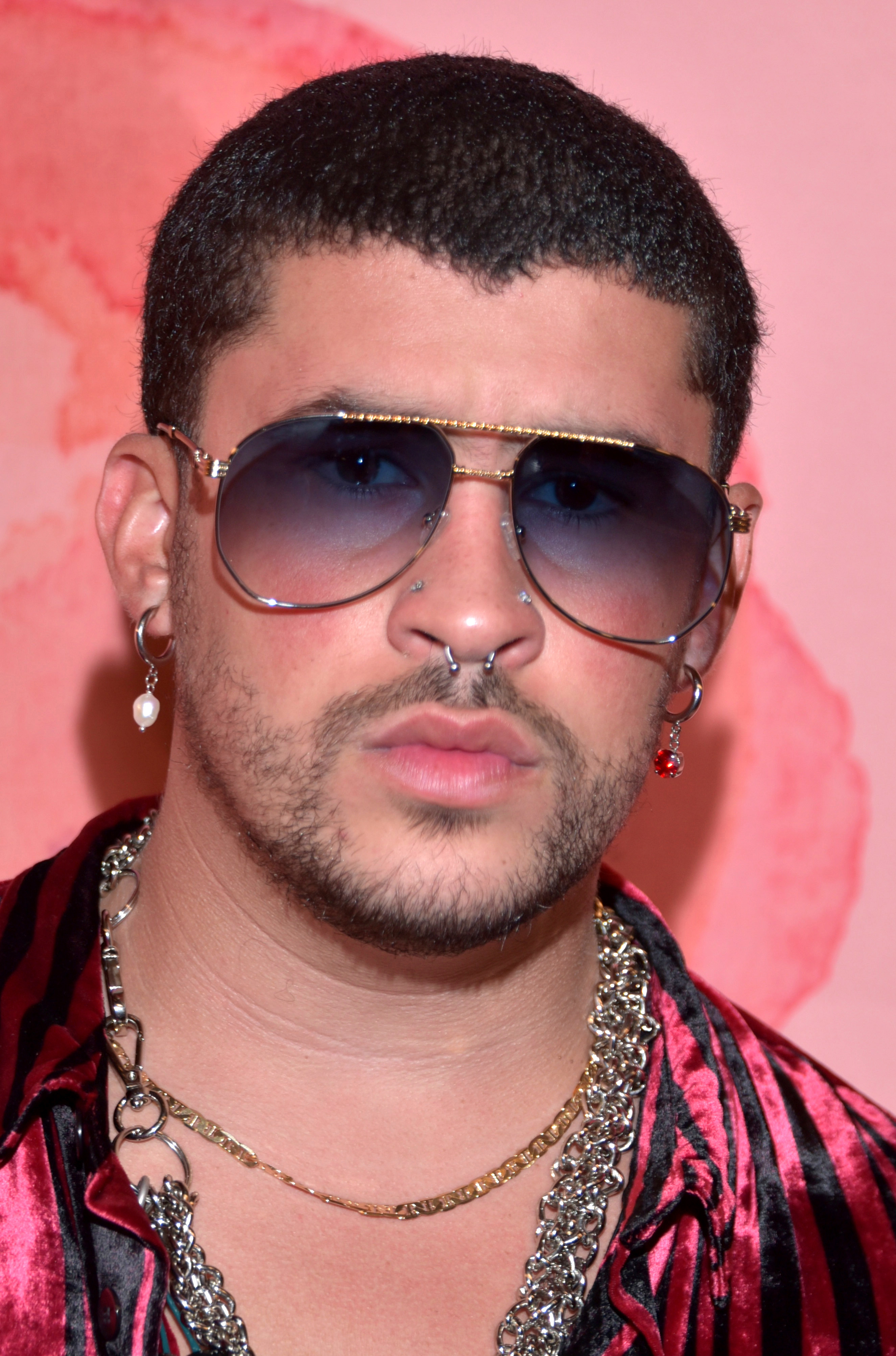
Bad Bunny, Puerto Rican Reggaeton artist

Puerto Rican reggaeton evolved from several genres, particularly Jamaican Dancehall and hip-hop.

Venezuelan rappers generally modeled their music after gangsta rap, embracing and attempting to redefine negative stereotypes about poor and black youth as dangerous and materialistic and incorporating socially conscious critique of Venezuela's criminalization of young, poor, Afro-descended people into their music.

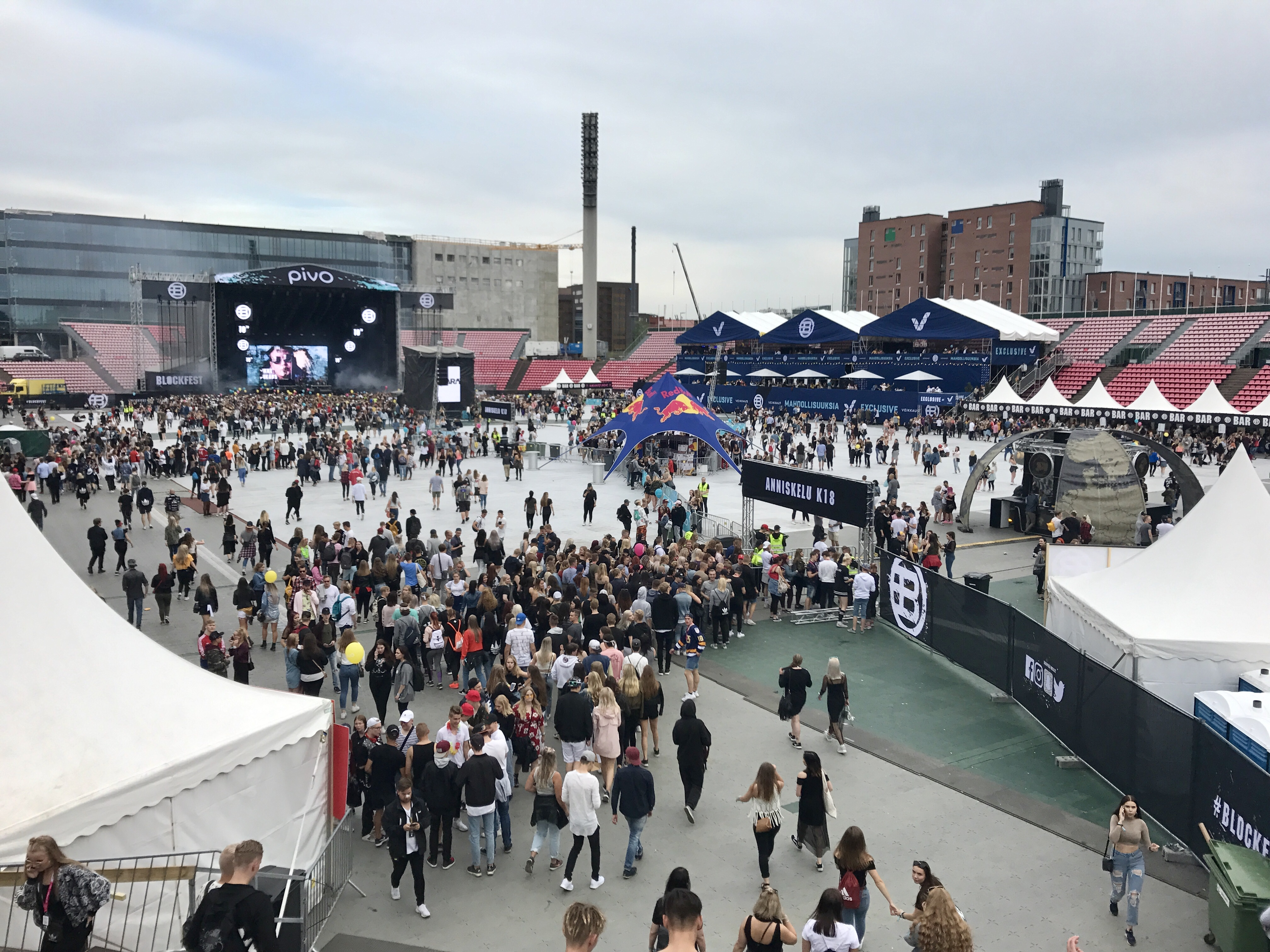
Blockfest

Haitian hip-hop developed in the early 1980s. Master Dji and his songs "Vakans" and "Politik Pa m" popularized the style. What later became known as "Rap Kreyòl" grew in popularity in the late 1990s with King Posse and Original Rap Stuff. Due to cheaper recording technology and flows of equipment to Haiti, more Rap Kreyòl is growing.

French hip-hop also developed in the 1980s. The annual Blockfest in Tampere, Finland is the largest hip-hop music event in the Nordic countries.

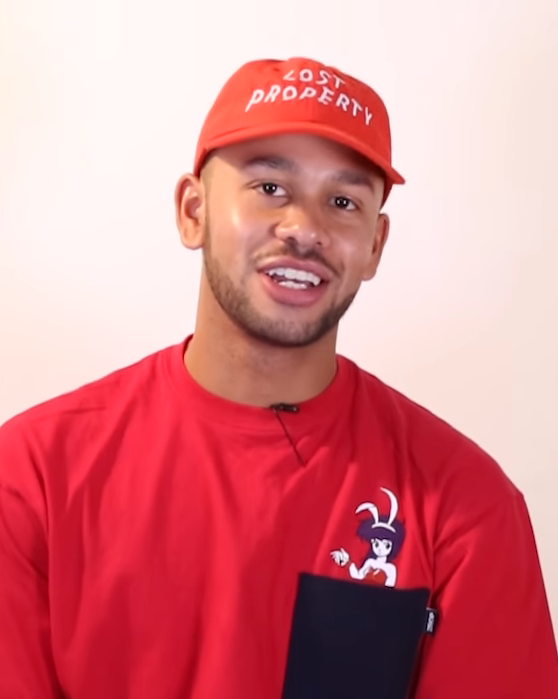
YoungstaCPT

Nigerian hip-hop gained popularity in the 1980s to 2000s through artists like The Remedies, JJC Skillz, M.I Abaga and Sound Sultan, encompassing the incorporation of local languages and traditional hip-hop beats. In the 2010s and 2020s it developed further with rappers like Naeto C, Reminisce, Olamide, Phyno, Blaqbonez and Odumodublvck.

South African hip-hop overlaps with kwaito, a music genre that emphasizes African culture and social issues. Rappers such as Pope Troy have harnessed the use of socio-economic issues plaguing the political spheres of South Africa and hip-hop as a whole whilst balancing his lingual approach in order to communicate with the masses about the technical aspects that are creating the issues, South African hip-hop has evolved into a prominent presence in mainstream South African music. Between the 1990s and 2010s, it had transcended its origins as a form of political expression in Cape Town to produce artists like HHP, Riky Rick and AKA. Prominent South African rappers include Stogie T, Reason, Da L.E.S, Cassper Nyovest, Emtee, Fifi Cooper, A-Reece, Shane Eagle, Nasty C, K.O, YoungstaCPT and Big Zulu.

In the 2010s, hip-hop became popular in Canada particularly in Toronto, which has a large Afro-Caribbean and African population. The city expressed a new sub-genre called Toronto sound. After Drake achieved mainstream success, the Toronto sound began with works by producers T-Minus and Boi-1da.

Hip-hop emerged in South Korea during the 1990s, as groups such as Seo Taiji and Boys and Deux introduced rap into mainstream Korean dance music. By the mid-to-late 1990s, Korean hip-hop had developed into a distinct music scene, with artists incorporating Korean-language lyrics and local cultural influences.

Illslick

Thai hip-hop emerged in the 1980s and gained mainstream popularity during the 1990s. The group Technical Knock Out (TKO) released Original Thai Rap in 1993, while Joey Boy helped popularize the genre with his self-titled album in 1995. During the 2000s, artists and groups such as Dajim, F.Hero, Thaitanium, and Buddha Bless, helped expand the genre's popularity. In the following years, Chiang Mai-based independent rapper Illslick contributed to its continued growth. He became one of Thailand's most popular and successful hip-hop artists and influenced a younger generation of rappers, including Youngohm, OG-ANIC, and Diamond MQT.

== See also ==
- Hip-hop and social injustice
- LGBTQ representation in hip-hop
- The Holy Book of Hip Hop
- List of hip-hop festivals
- List of hip-hop genres
- List of hip-hop musicians
- List of murdered hip-hop musicians
- Misogyny in rap music
- Music of the United States
- Video vixen
