= Sugar Hill Records (hip-hop label) discography =

The following is a list of albums released by now-defunct hip-hop record label Sugar Hill Records.

== 1980 ==
- Blood Brothers — Blood Brothers
- Brother to Brother — Brother 2 Brother
- First Class — First Class
- Positive Force — Positive Force
- The Sequence — Sugarhill Presents the Sequence
- The Sugarhill Gang — Sugarhill Gang
- Various artists — The Great Rap Hits
- Wood, Brass & Steel — Hard & Heavy

== 1981 ==
- Jack McDuff — Kisses
- The Sugarhill Gang — 8th Wonder
- Various artists — Greatest Rap Hits Vol. 2
- West Street Mob — West Street Mob
- The Mean Machine - Disco Dream

== 1982 ==
- Grandmaster Flash and the Furious Five — The Message
- Jack McDuff — Having a Good Time
- Harry Ray — It's Good to Be Home
- The Sequence — The Sequence
- Candi Staton — Nightlites
- Trouble Funk — Drop the Bomb
- Various artists — Rapped Uptight

== 1983 ==
- Grandmaster Flash and the Furious Five — Grandmaster Flash & the Furious Five
- The Sequence — The Sequence Party
- The Sugarhill Gang — Greatest Hits
- The Sugarhill Gang — Rappin' Down Town
- Treacherous Three — Whip It
- Various artists — Sugar Hill Express (The Best Of Rap & Funk)
- West Street Mob — Break Dance (Electric Boogie)

== 1984 ==
- Crash Crew — The Crash Crew
- Grandmaster Flash and the Furious Five — Greatest Messages
- Grandmaster Melle Mel and the Furious Five — Grandmaster Melle Mel and the Furious Five
- Jack McDuff — Live It Up
- New Guys On The Block — The New Guys On The Block
- The Sugarhill Gang — Livin' in the Fast Lane
- Joey Travolta — Hold On
- Treacherous Three — The Treacherous Three
- Various artists — Street Beats
- Philippé Wynne — Philippé Wynne

== 1985 ==
- Grandmaster Melle Mel and the Furious Five — Stepping Off
