= The Sugar Hill Records Story =

Compilation album by Various Artists
- Released: February 4, 1997
- Length: 396:45
- Label: Rhino
- Producers: Chris Clarke, Steve Greenberg

The Sugar Hill Records Story is a 1997 compilation album compiling singles released by the Sugar Hill Records label. It was released by Rhino Records who had purchased the North American rights to the labels catalogue in 1995. On its release, it received positive reviews from Vibe, Spin and AllMusic.

== Background and development ==
Rhino Records purchased the rights to the Sugar Hill Records catalogue in June 1995. The set was at one point announce for release in January 21, 1997. Each cover of the CD in the set featured different cover art based on Sugar Hill logos over the years. The record contains two previously unreleased tracks: "Scratching" by The Cash Crew and "Here Comes the Bride" by The Sequence.

The compilation is a five-disc set and consisted of 56 tracks which were all digitally remastered. The tracks were selected by Rhino's R&B staff with the help of some hip-hop historians according to Quincy Newell of Rhino.

== Release ==
The album was released on February 4, 1997. Initial releases of the album included limited edition 12-inch vinyl insert of "The Message" by Grandmaster Flash and the Furious Five. On its release, Rhino held a record release party in Los Angeles around the release date.

== Reception ==
Professional ratings
Review scores
Source	Rating
AllMusic	5/5 stars
Spin	(8/10)

From contemporary reviews, Chairman Mao of Vibe praised certain tracks such as Grand Master Flash and the Furious Five's "Freedom" and "It's Nasty (Genius of Love)" along with Funky 4+1's "That's the Joint" as well as Spoonie G's "Monster Jam" and "The Adventures of Grandmaster Flash on the Wheels of Steel" Mao noted that Treacherous Three's tracks such as "Whip It", and Sugarhill Gang's "The Lover in You" and "Girls" would have better been replaced with "such glaring omissions as " Treacherous superior "Action" and Trouble Funk's "Pump Me Up". The review concluded that "despite its excesses [the album] assembles enough moments to merit the attention to the uninitiated and those want to reminisce over consummate party grooves past."

Barry Walters of Spin noted the essays included noting that the Sugar Hill Records sound was instrumental for approximating how DJ's deconstructed disco grooves and concluded that it was "striking how fresh most of this stuff still sounds. The hotel/motel/Holiday Inn rhymes of the early cuts may be fluff, but its uplifting fluff with a sense of discovery." Stephen Thomas Erlewine of AllMusic gave the compilation a five-star review, noting that Sugar Hill Records music "remaining out of print during the rise of the hip-hop during the late '80s and '90s. The five-disc Sugar Hill Records Story remedies this situation" but that the "true revelation of the box set is how strong largely forgotten cuts by Spoonie Gee, the Funky 4 + 1, Trouble Funk, the Sequence, Super Wolf, and West Street Mob are -- these are supremely funky, infectious and inventive cuts, which have been made familiar through samples and quotations on modern rap records." Erlewine noted that "There is the occasional dull spot or oddity (check out the bizarre B-52's rip-off "At the Ice Arcade" by the Chilly Kids) that interrupts the flow, but the music is consistently strong, even on the fifth disc."

== Track listing ==
CD 1

1. The Sugarhill Gang - "Rapper's Delight"
2. The Sequence - "Funk You Up"
3. The Sugarhill Gang - "Rapper's Reprise (Jam-Jam)"
4. Super-Wolf - "Super-Wolf Can Do It"
5. The Sugarhill Gang - "Hot Hot Summer Day"
6. The Sequence - "And You Know That"
7. Grandmaster Flash - "Freedom"
8. Spoonie Gee - "Monster Jam"
9. The Moments - "Baby Let's Rap Now, Pt. 2"
10. Positive Force - "People Get on Up"

CD 2

1. The Sugarhill Gang - "8th Wonder"
2. Funky 4 + 1 - "That's the Joint"
3. Grandmaster Flash - "The Birthday Party"
4. Wayne & Charlie (The Rapping Dummy) - "Check It Out"
5. Grandmaster Flash - "The Adventures of Grandmaster Flash on the Wheels of Steel"
6. Grandmaster Flash and the Furious Five - "Showdown"
7. West Street Mob - "Let's Dance (Make Your Body Move)"
8. Spoonie Gee - "Spoonie is Back"
9. The Sugarhill Gang - "Apache"
10. Grandmaster Flash and the Furious Five - "It's Nasty (Genius of Love)"

CD 3

1. Trouble Funk - "Hey Fellas"
2. West Street Mob - "Sing a Simple Song"
3. Sylvia Robinson - "It's Good to Be the Queen"
4. The Sugarhill Gang - "The Lover in You"
5. Grandmaster Flash and the Furious Five - "The Message"
6. Treacherous Three - "Whip It"
7. Crash Crew - "Scratching"
8. West Street Mob - "Ooh Baby"
9. Grandmaster Flash - "Scorpio"
10. Busy Bee - "Making Cash Money"
11. The Sequence - "Here Comes the Bride"

CD 4

1. Melle Mel & The Furious 5 - "Message II (Survival)"
2. Crash Crew - "Braking Bells (Take Me to the Mardi Gras)"
3. Treacherous Three - "Yes We Can-Can"
4. The Sugarhill Gang - "The Word is Out"
5. Grandmaster Flash and the Furious Five - "New York New York"
6. The Sugarhill Gang - "Girls"
7. The Sugarhill Gang - "Kick It Live from 9 to 5"
8. West Street Mob - "Break Dancin' (Electric Boogie)"
9. Kevie Kev - "All Night Long (Waterbed)"
10. Chilly Kids - "At the Ice Arcade"
11. Melle Mel & The Furious 5 - "White Lines (Don't Don't Do It)"
12. Crash Crew - "We Are Known as Emcees (We Turn Party's Out)"

CD 5

1. Grandmaster Melle Mel - "Jesse"
2. Grandmaster Melle Mel - "Beat Street"
3. The Sugarhill Gang - "Livin' in the Fast Lane"
4. Melle Mel & The Furious 5 - "We Don't Work for Free"
5. The Furious Five feat. Cowboy, Melle Mel & Scorpio - "Step Off"
6. Treacherous Three - "Xmas Rap"
7. Busy Bee - "Busy Bee's Groove"
8. Treacherous Three - Turn It Up
9. The Sugarhill Gang - The Down Beat
10. Grandmaster Melle Mel - Vice (from Miami Vice)
11. Miracle Mike & the Ladies of the 80s's - "Outta Control"
12. Mass Production - "Street Walker"
13. Grandmaster Flash and the Furious Five feat. Melle Mel & Duke Bootee - "The Message ('97 Dungeon Mix)"
