= Rappin' Down Town =

Studio album by The Sugarhill Gang
- Released: 1983
- Recorded: 1982–1983
- Genre: Old school hip hop, hip hop
- Length: 38:53
- Label: Sugar Hill

The Sugarhill Gang chronology
| 8th Wonder (1982) | Rappin' Down Town (1983) | Livin' in the Fast Lane (1984) |

Rappin' Down Town is the third album from New York City-based rap/hip hop group The Sugarhill Gang. Released in 1983, this album includes the minor R&B hits "The Lover in You" and "The Word is Out."

The final three tracks on the album would also appear on the band's next album, Livin' in the Fast Lane, the following year, with "Kick it Live" becoming a moderate hit.

== Background ==
The Sugarhill Gang's debut single "Rapper's Delight" has been said to popularize rap music and bring the genre into mainstream music in America. Rappin' Down Town was the third album the group recorded.

== Track listing ==
1. "The Lover in You" (Pete Wingfield, Sylvia Robinson) (6:52)
2. "The Word is Out" (Bernard Alexander, Doug Wimbish, Guy O'Brien, Henry Jackson, Michael Wright, Robinson) (5:40)
3. "Winner Is" (Wimbish, Skip McDonald) (6:48)
4. "Kick It Live from 9 to 5 (Michael Hepburn, Pleasure) (6:25)
5. "Space Race" (Wimbish, Ed Fletcher, McDonald) (7:41)
6. "Girls" (Al Goodman, Harry Ray, Wright, O'Brien, Venus Dodson) (5:37)
