= Jump On It! =

Studio album by the Sugarhill Gang
- Released: July 6, 1999
- Genres: Children's music; old-school hip-hop
- Length: 31:29
- Language: English
- Label: Kid Rhino
- Producers: Joey Robinson, Jr.; Leland Robinson; Jonathan Williams; Wonder Mike

The Sugarhill Gang chronology
Livin' in the Fast Lane (1984)	Jump On It! (1999)

Jump On It! is the fifth and final studio album by American old-school hip-hop group the Sugarhill Gang. Rather than adapt to urban contemporary music, the group recorded children's music in their classic sound, making it among the first hip-hop albums for kids. The album was the only one released after the trio: Big Bank Hank, Master Gee, and Wonder Mike, reunited in the 1990s. It was promoted by a jump rope contest for children in coordination with the Boys & Girls Clubs of America, who received a portion of the proceeds from album sales.

The album was devised by Rhino Records executive Richard Foos and was intended to be paired with a line of children's clothing, educational videos, and television programming, but this never came to fruition.

== Reception ==
Editors at AllMusic rated this album 3 out of 5 stars, with critic Keith Farley writing that "as fun and educational as Jump on It! is for kids, though, this album is a non-starter for hip-hop fans" due to the simplistic rhymes. A brief overview of the group's work in B.E.T. Weekend gave this release 3.5 out of 5 stars for being able to teach children.

== Track listing ==
1. "Jump on It" (Joey Robinson, Jr. and Michael Wright) – 3:28
2. "Kick a Rhyme with Dr. Seuss" (traditional) – 3:56
3. "ABC's" (Big Bank Hank, J. Robinson, and Wright) – 2:30
4. "It's Like a Dream Sometimes" (Wright) – 2:43
5. "The Vowels" (Jonathan Williams and Wright) – 3:05
6. "Fireworks" (Lynn Ahrens) – 2:39
7. "Last Day of School" (Big Bank Hank, J. Robinson, and Wright) – 3:11
8. "Kid's Rapper's Delight (Kid's Rap-Along)" (Bernard Edwards, J. Robinson, Sylvia Robinson, Nile Rodgers, and Wright) – 5:08
9. "Sugar Hill Groove" (J. Robinson and Wright) – 3:06
10. "My Little Playmate" (J. Robinson, S. Robinson, and Wright) – 1:43

== Personnel ==
The Sugarhill Gang

- Big Bank Hank – rapping, engineering
- Master Gee – rapping, arrangement, engineering, mixing, production, artwork, executive production
- Wonder Mike – rapping, arrangement, engineering, mixing, production, artwork

Additional personnel

- Hugh Brown – photography
- Melvin Glover – artwork
- Grandmaster Melle Mel – rapping on "It's Like a Dream Sometimes"
- Nancy L. Hopkins – design
- Matt Oppenheimer – executive in charge of music
- Positive Force – performance on "Kid's Rapper's Delight (Kid's Rap-Along)"
- Leland Robinson – production, artwork, executive production
- Doug Schwartz – mastering
- Sugar Hill House Band
- Jonathan Williams – performance on "The Vowels" and "My Little Playmate", mixing, production, artwork

== See also ==
- List of 1999 albums
