= That's the Joint =

1980 single by Funky 4 + 1

"That's The Joint"

Single by Funky 4 + 1
- Released: 1980
- Genre: Old school hip hop, funk, jazz, disco
- Length: 9:05; 9:24 (UK version)
- Label: Sugar Hill Records
- Songwriter(s): Clifton "Jiggs" Chase, Sylvia Robinson, Keith Caesar, Sharon Green, Jeffrey Myree, Kevin Smith, Rodney Stone
- Producer(s): Jigsaw Inc., Sylvia Robinson

Funky 4 + 1 singles chronology
"Rappin and Rockin the House" (1979)	"That's The Joint" (1980)	"Do You Want to Rock (Before I Let Go)" (1982)

"That's The Joint" is a song by rap group Funky 4 + 1 released as their second single.

The single became Funky 4 + 1's signature song and is frequently cited as influential early hip hop record borrowing from disco, funk and jazz. It was arranged by jazz organist Clifton "Jiggs" Chase and includes dance rhythms (it was performed live with dance routines). It features rapping from all group's members and many parts sung together. The instrumental includes a sample of "Rescue Me" by A Taste of Honey.

Rolling Stone listed "That's the Joint" at number 288 on their updated list of the 500 Greatest Songs of All Time in September 2021. It was also listed on The Pitchfork 500 and as 47th best hip hop song of all time by Rolling Stone. It was named the best song of the 1980s by music critic Robert Christgau. In his initial review Christgau gave it 'A' rating and wrote: "The instrumental track, carried by Sugarhill bassist Doug Wimbish, is so compelling that for a while I listened to it alone on its B-side version. And the rapping is the peak of the form, not verbally—the debut has funnier words—but rhythmically. Quick tradeoffs and clamorous breaks vary the steady-flow rhyming of the individual MCs, and when it comes to Sha-Rock, Miss Plus One herself, who needs variation?".

The song has been sampled many times in hip-hop production since its release, including on the song "Say No Go" by De La Soul on their album 3 Feet High and Rising, and by Beastie Boys on the songs "Shake Your Rump" and "Shadrach" on their album Paul's Boutique.

== Track listing ==
Side A

1. That's The Joint (Vocal) – 9:05

Side B

1. That's The Joint (Instrumental) – 9:05
