= 8th Wonder (song) =

Single by the Sugarhill Gang

from the album 8th Wonder
- B-side: "Sugar Hill Groove"
- Released: 1980
- Genre: Old-school hip hop
- Length: 3:56 (Album & 7" Version); 7:21 (12" Version)
- Label: Sugar Hill
- Songwriters: Cheryl Cook; Ronald LaPread
- Producers: Joey Robinson; Sylvia Robinson

The Sugarhill Gang singles chronology
"Rapper's Reprise (Jam Jam)" (1980)	"8th Wonder" (1980)	"Apache" (1981)

"8th Wonder" is a 1980 single by the American hip hop trio the Sugarhill Gang, originally released on Sugar Hill. It was later included in the 1981 album 8th Wonder.

== Chart performance ==
The song charted at #82 on the Billboard Hot 100 in the United States.

Chart (1981)	Peak position
U.S. Billboard Hot 100	82
U.S. Billboard Disco Top 100	38
U.S. Billboard Hot Soul Singles	15

== In popular culture ==
- A slowed down version of the music from this song is used in the DVD menus for the series Trailer Park Boys, as the backing of a song performed by the character of Tyrone.
- The song was also featured in the 1983 PBS documentary Style Wars.

== Sampling ==
=== Samples Used ===
The song sampled two others:

- "Ever Ready" by Johnnie Taylor (1978)
- "Daisy Lady" by 7th Wonder (1979)

=== Samples taken ===
The song, in turn, has been sampled over twenty times, including in:

- "The Adventures of Grandmaster Flash on the Wheels of Steel" by Grandmaster Flash and the Furious Five (1981)
- "Public Enemy No.1" by Public Enemy (1987)
- "Shake Your Rump" by Beastie Boys (1989)
- "Rap Promoter" by A Tribe Called Quest (1991)
- "Back Up Off Me!" by Dr. Dre and Ed Lover feat. T-Money (1994)
- "Woo Hah!! Got You All in Check" by Busta Rhymes (1996)
- "Never Mind" by 112 (1998)
- "Gangster Trippin'" by Fatboy Slim (1998)
- "K.O.B.E." by Kobe Bryant ft Tyra Banks (2000)
- "I'm Gonna Be Alright" by Jennifer Lopez (2001)
