= Master Gee (musician) =

American hip hop artist and DJ

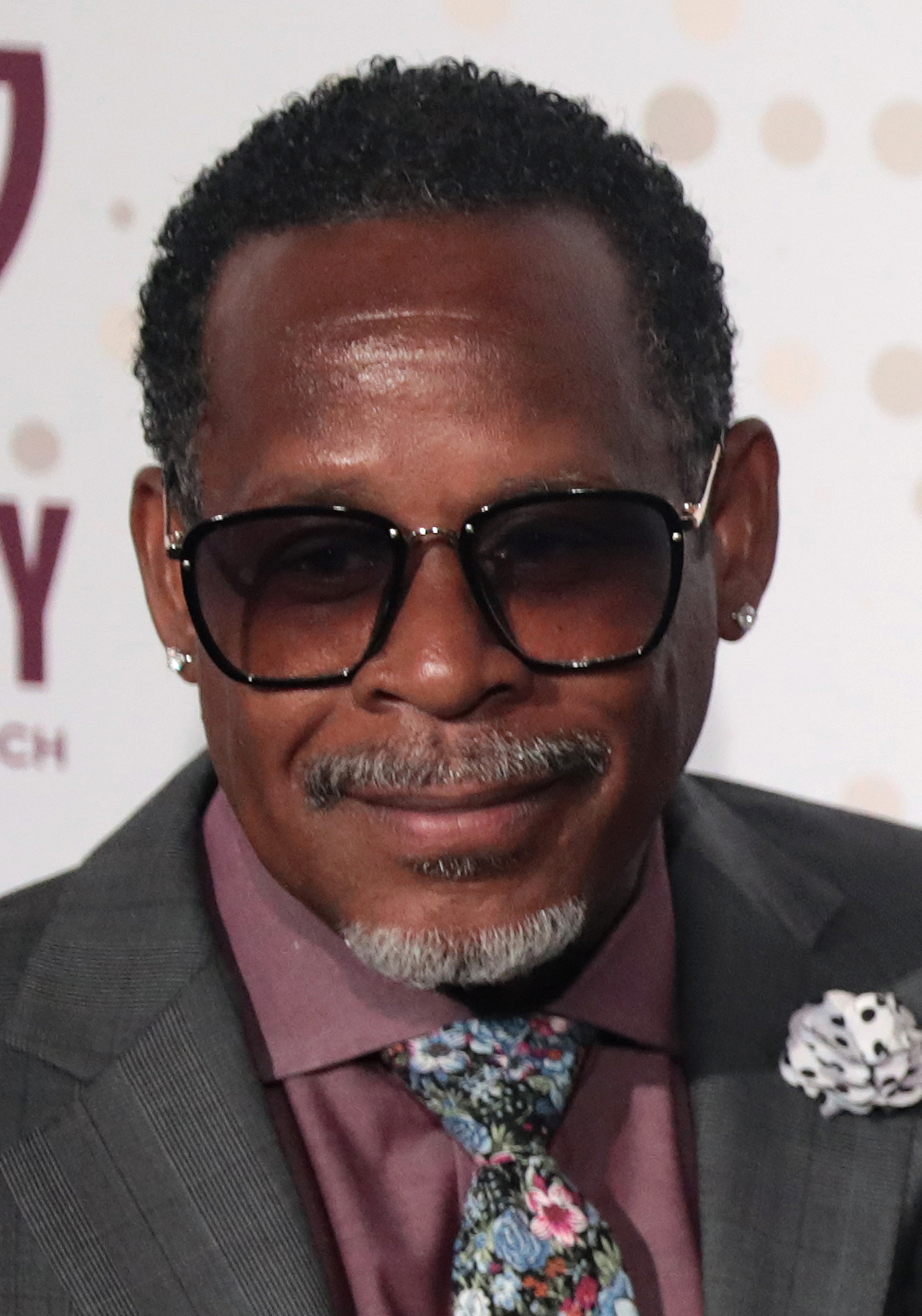
- Master Gee in 2023

Background information
- Born: Guy Anthony O'Brien; January 9, 1962 (age 64)
- Origin: Teaneck, New Jersey
- Genres: Hip hop
- Occupations: Rapper; DJ
- Years active: 1979–present
- Labels: Kid Rhino; Sugar Hill
- Member of: The Sugarhill Gang

Guy Anthony O'Brien (born January 9, 1962), known by his stage name Master Gee, is an American hip hop recording artist and DJ. He is a founding member of the hip hop group the Sugarhill Gang. On the band's signature song, "Rapper's Delight", he raps, "I said M-A-S-T-E-R, a G with a double E, I said I go by the unforgettable name of the man they call the Master Gee". He was 17 at the time of recording the song, alluded to by the lyric, "I guess by now you can take a hunch, and find that I am the baby of the bunch".

== Biography ==
O'Brien grew up in Teaneck, New Jersey, where at an early age he was exposed to a steady stream of doo wop and rhythm and blues, and established himself as an energetic emcee in the pioneering Phase 2 hip-hop crew. During the early infancy of the commercial hip-hop movement in 1979, Master Gee, Big Bank Hank and Wonder Mike were discovered by producer Sylvia Robinson and brought together to form The Sugarhill Gang. He is the older brother of Leo O'Brien, who portrayed "Richie Green" in The Last Dragon.

O'Brien stepped away from Sugar Hill Records in 1984, and established himself as a successful entrepreneur in the magazine industry. During the group's departure from the label, Joey Robinson Jr., son of Sugar Hill producer Sylvia Robinson, used the stage name Master Gee. O'Brien and Wonder Mike went to court over the use of the group's name and stage names as documented in the film, I Want My Name Back. In 2014, name usage was amicably resolved, and Master Gee has since re-emerged as a mainstay in the hip hop community and music industry.

O'Brien appeared on GQ's Most Expensivest, hosted by 2 Chainz in 2023.

He currently lives in the Washington, D.C. area, and actively performs worldwide with The Sugarhill Gang and as a solo DJ.
