= 8th Wonder (album) =

Studio album by the Sugarhill Gang
- Released: June 25, 1981
- Recorded: 1980–1981
- Genres: Rap; dance music
- Length: 44:24
- Label: Sugar Hill
- Producers: Sylvia Robinson; James Cullimore

The Sugarhill Gang chronology
Sugarhill Gang (1980)	8th Wonder (1981)	Rappin' Down Town (1983)

Singles from 8th Wonder
- 1. "8th Wonder" Released: 1980; 2. "Apache" Released: November 1981

8th Wonder is the second album by the American rap group the Sugarhill Gang. The album was released in 1981 for Sugar Hill Records and was again produced by Sylvia Robinson and James Cullimore. Though not as successful as the group's previous album, the album did feature the minor hits "8th Wonder" and "Apache" and featured an appearance by another Sugar Hill Records rap group, Grandmaster Flash and the Furious Five on "Showdown".

== Commercial performance ==
The album debuted at number 66 on Billboard's Soul LPs chart on January 16, 1982.

== Critical reception ==
Professional ratings
Review scores
Source	Rating
AllMusic	3/5 stars
Robert Christgau	B

The Globe and Mail advised: "Don't expect anything new—there's still a lot of stuff about how great it is to be a member of The Sugarhill Gang and how the ladies fall for it." Robert Christgau noted that "professional is as good as they get, and in the absence of vaguely interesting words the singing tracks are funktional dance music at best."

== Track listing ==
No.	Title	Length
1.	"Funk Box"	8:05
2.	"On the Money"	5:25
3.	"8th Wonder"	3:56
4.	"Apache"	6:09
5.	"Showdown" (with Grandmaster Flash and the Furious Five)	5:41
6.	"Giggalo"	3:51
7.	"Hot Hot Summer Day"	3:27

== Charts ==
Chart (1982)	Peak position
US Billboard 200	50
US Top R&B/Hip-Hop Albums (Billboard)	15
