= Livin' in the Fast Lane =

Studio album by The Sugarhill Gang
- Released: June 27, 1984
- Recorded: 1983–1984
- Genre: Hip hop
- Length: 42:59
- Label: Sugar Hill

The Sugarhill Gang chronology
Rappin' Down Town (1983)	Livin' in the Fast Lane (1984)	Jump on It! (1999)

Professional ratings
Review scores
Source	Rating
AXS.tv	negative

Livin' in the Fast Lane is the fourth studio album by the American hip hop group The Sugarhill Gang, released in 1984 on Sugar Hill Records.

== Track listing ==
No.	Title	Length
1.	"Girls"	5:36
2.	"Fast Lane"	5:08
3.	"I Like What You're Doing"	5:25
4.	"Kick It Live"	6:23
5.	"Troy"	6:32
6.	"Real Funky"	6:05
7.	"Space Race"	7:40

Samples and notes

- "Troy" samples "Mosquito", by West Street Mob
