= Funky 4 + 1 =

American hip hop group

- Also known as: Funky 4 + 1 More; Funky Four Plus One; Funky Four Plus One More; Funky Four
- Origin: Bronx, New York City
- Genre: Hip hop
- Years active: 1977–1983
- Labels: Enjoy Records; Sugar Hill Records
- Past members: Keith Keith; Sha-Rock; DJ Breakout; Jazzy Jeff; Rahiem; K.K. Rockwell; Li'l Rodney C!; DJ Baron

Funky 4 + 1 was an American hip hop group from The Bronx, New York, composed of Jazzy Jeff, Sha-Rock (b. Sharon Green), D.J. Breakout, Guy Williams, Keith Keith, The Voice of K.K., and Rodney Cee (Stone). The group originally started with K.K Rockwell, Keith Caesar, Rahiem and Sha Rock, the rest of the members joined at later times. The latter two members also performed together as the duo Double Trouble, notably in the film Wild Style. They were the first hip hop group to receive a record deal, as well as the first to perform live on national television. The group was also the first to start selling their records commercially. The group was also notable for being the first to have a woman MC, Sha-Rock.

== History ==
"That's the Joint" was interpolated from A Taste of Honey's "Rescue Me". Music critic Robert Christgau of The Village Voice named it the best song of the 1980s. In his 1981 review of the single, Christgau gave it an A rating and wrote of its musical significance:

The instrumental track, carried by Sugarhill bassist Doug Wimbish, is so compelling that for a while I listened to it alone on its B-side version. And the rapping is the peak of the form, not verbally—the debut has funnier words—but rhythmically. Quick tradeoffs and clamorous breaks vary the steady-flow rhyming of the individual MCs, and when it comes to Sha-Rock, Miss Plus One herself, who needs variation?"

Funky 4 + 1 was the first hip hop group to appear on a national television show; on February 14 (Valentine's Day) 1981 they performed on Saturday Night Live hosted by Blondie's Debbie Harry.

The group was subsequently asked by Harry to open up for Blondie on tour, but were forbidden to do so by Sugarhill Records' CEO, Sylvia Robinson.

In 2008, "That's the Joint" was ranked number 41 on VH1's 100 Greatest Songs of Hip Hop.

Keith Keith died on August 21, 2026, at the age of 64.

== Discography ==
=== Compilation albums ===
List of compilation albums
Title	Album details
Crash Crew Meets Funky Four (Note: Also recopilates works of Crash Crew.)	Released: 1983; Label: Vogue/Sugar Hill; Formats: LP
That's the Joint	Released: 1989; Label: P-Vine; Formats: LP, CD
Back to the Old School 2: That's the Joint	Released: 2000; Label: Sequel; Formats: CD, digital download

=== Promotional singles ===
List of singles, showing year released and album name
Title	Year	Album
"Rappin' and Rocking the House" (Note: Released as "Funky Four Plus One More".)	1979	Non-album single
"That's the Joint"	1980	Crash Crew Meets Funky Four
"Do You Want to Rock (Before I Let Go)" (Note: Released as "Funky Four".)	1982	Crash Crew Meets Funky Four
"Feel It (The Mexican)"	1983	Crash Crew Meets Funky Four

== Members ==
- The Voice of K.K. aka K.K. Rockwell (Kevin Smith) (1977–1981)
- Keith Keith (Keith Caesar) (1977–1983; died 2026)
- Sha Rock (Sharon Green) (1977–1983)
- Rahiem (Guy Todd Williams) (1977–1979)
- Lil' Rodney C! (Rodney Stone) (1979–1981)
- Jazzy Jeff (Jeff Miree) (1979–1983)
- D.J. Breakout (Keith Williams) (1977–1983)
- D.J. Baron (Baron Chappell) (1977–1980)
