= Jump on It =

Jump on It may refer to:

- Jump on It (Montrose album), 1976 album by hard rock band Montrose
- "Jump On It!", 1981 song by rap group the Sugarhill Gang
- "Jump on It", a song from Sir Mix-a-Lot's 1996 album Return of the Bumpasaurus
- Jump on It, 2023 album by Bill Orcutt
