= Big Bank Hank =

American hip hop artist (1956–2014)

Background information
- Born: Henry Lee Jackson; January 11, 1956; The Bronx, New York City, U.S.
- Died: November 11, 2014 (aged 58) Englewood, New Jersey, U.S.
- Genres: Hip hop; old school hip hop
- Occupations: Rapper; manager
- Years active: 1973–2014
- Label: Sugar Hill
- Formerly of: The Sugarhill Gang

Henry Lee Jackson (January 11, 1956 – November 11, 2014), known by his stage name Big Bank Hank, was an American hip hop recording artist and manager. Also known as Imp the Dimp, he was a member of the trio the Sugarhill Gang, the first hip hop act to have a hit with the cross-over single "Rapper's Delight" on the pop charts in 1979. He contributed to many documentaries based on the rap music industry. Lyrics to his verse from "Rapper's Delight" were allegedly plagiarized from rhymes written by Grandmaster Caz.

== Biography ==
Hank was born as Henry Lee Jackson on January 11, 1956. He grew up in the Bronx, New York City, near DJ Kool Herc and Coke La Rock, as well as other rap performers. He won several championships in wrestling at Bronx Community College, where he graduated with an A.S. degree in oceanography. Unable to attain a position in oceanography, he worked the doors of a Bronx nightclub called The Sparkle, where he became a music manager for Grandmaster Caz and his group the Mighty Force MC's.

While working at a pizzeria, Jackson did his job so well that when the owner of the shop expanded his business to Englewood, New Jersey, he brought Jackson over to head the Crispy Crust store. While managing for a local hip hop group, the Mighty Force MC's (including Grandmaster Caz), Jackson was discovered by Sylvia Robinson. She was out trying to find an act for the new hip-hop trend she had discovered through her son and she heard Jackson rapping some of Grandmaster Caz's rhymes by chance when she visited Crispy Crust Pizza in Englewood. According to a 2014 New York Post article, when Robinson asked him to join the group she was forming, Jackson went to Grandmaster Caz of the Cold Crush Brothers for rhymes, and Caz gladly gave him his notebook, hoping to eventually get something in return. However, since the Sugarhill Gang's inception, stated again in a 2014 interview, Caz has disputed this story, saying that Jackson did not ask him for permission to use his rhymes until after the record had been made. Jackson, now called "Big Bank Hank," was 24 years old at the time the Sugarhill Gang's self-titled album was released.

In his New York Times obituary of Hank, Jon Caramanica quotes Wonder Mike: "He was boisterous — he filled the room. Ralph Kramden-type stuff."

== Death ==
A resident of Tenafly, New Jersey, Hank died at the age of 58 at Englewood Hospital and Medical Center in nearby Englewood on November 11, 2014, from cancer.
