= The Crash Crew =

Crash Crew

Studio album by Crash Crew
- Released: 1984
- Recorded: 1981–84
- Studio: Sweet Mountain Studios (Englewood, New Jersey)
- Genre: Hip hop
- Label: Sugar Hill
- Producer: Sylvia Robinson

Singles from Crash Crew
- 1. "We Want To Rock" Released: 1981; 2. "Breaking Bells (Take Me To The Mardi Gras)" Released: 1982; 3. "On The Radio" Released: 1983; 4. "We Are Known As Emcees (We Turn Party's Out)" Released: 1983

Professional ratings
Review scores
Source	Rating
AllMusic	4/5 stars

Crash Crew is the self-titled debut studio album by American hip hop group Crash Crew. It was released in 1984 through Sugar Hill Records. The album was never properly finished due to Sugar Hill's financial difficulties.

== Track listing ==
No.	Title	Writer(s)	Length
1.	"Breaking Bells"	Paul Simon	7:22
2.	"On the Radio"	George Belton, Jr.; Michael Fleming; Darryl Calloway; Reginald Payne; Larry Miller; Barry Bailey	5:43
3.	"We Are Known As Emcees (We Turn Party's Out)"	Belton, Jr.; Fleming; Calloway; Payne; Miller; Bailey	5:33
4.	"We Want to Rock"	Belton, Jr.; Fleming; Calloway; Payne; Miller; Bailey; Sylvia Robinson; Clifton Chase	6:09
5.	"Scratching"	Belton, Jr.; Fleming; Calloway; Payne; Miller; Bailey	5:37
