= Sugarhill Gang (album) =

Studio album by the Sugarhill Gang
- Released: February 7, 1980
- Recorded: 1979
- Genres: Old-school hip hop; disco; soul
- Length: 39:17
- Label: Sugarhill
- Producer: Sylvia Robinson

The Sugarhill Gang chronology
Sugarhill Gang (1980)	8th Wonder (1981)

Singles from Sugarhill Gang
- 1. "Rapper's Delight" Released: September 16, 1979; 2. "Rapper's Reprise" Released: 1980; 3. "Hot Hot Summer Day" Released: 1980; 4. "Here I Am" Released: 1980

Sugarhill Gang is the self-titled debut album by the rap group the Sugarhill Gang. It is considered to be the first hip hop studio album, leading to more studio albums by other rappers.

== Reception ==
Professional ratings
Review scores
Source	Rating
AllMusic	4/5 stars
Smash Hits	5/10
Uncut	4/5 stars

The album was released in 1980 for Sugarhill Records and was produced by Sylvia Robinson. The single "Rapper's Delight" was the first rap single to become a top-40 hit on the Billboard Hot 100, reaching number 36 on the U.S. pop chart and number 4 on the R&B chart. Although "Rapper's Delight" was the only charting single, the album also included the minor hit, "Rapper's Reprise". Aside from the two singles and "Sugarhill Groove", the remainder of the LP consists of several down-tempo soul tracks and a disco instrumental, as Sylvia Robinson did not believe an album consisting entirely of hip hop music would be commercially viable in 1980.

== Track listing ==
No.	Title	Writer(s)	Length
1.	"Here I Am"	Craig Derry, Nate Edmonds	5:09
2.	"Rapper's Reprise (Jam-Jam) (featuring the Sequence)"	Sylvia Robinson	7:40
3.	"Bad News (Don't Bother Me)"	Guy O'Brien, Henry Jackson, Michael Wright	6:45
4.	"Sugarhill Groove"	Guy O'Brien, Henry Jackson, Michael Wright, Sylvia Robinson	9:52
5.	"Passion Play"	Brenda Reynolds, Nate Edmonds, Ray Smith	5:10
6.	"Rapper's Delight"	Bernard Edwards, Nile Rodgers	14:37 [4:55 – shortened single version]

Notes

- "Rapper's Delight" contains interpolations of "Good Times", written by Bernard Edwards and Nile Rodgers and performed by Chic, and "Here Comes That Sound Again", written by Alan Hawkshaw and performed by Love De-Luxe.

== Personnel ==
- Rappers – Big Bank Hank, Wonder Mike, Master Gee (The Sugarhill Gang)
- Backing vocals, and rhythm arrangements – Positive Force (tracks 3, 5, 6)
- Bass – Bernard Rowland (tracks 3, 5, 6), Doug Wimbish, possibly Chip Shearin (track 6)
- Drums – Bryan Horton (tracks 3, 5, 6), Keith LeBlanc
- Guitar – Albert Pittman (tracks 3, 5, 6), Skip McDonald, possibly Brian Morgan (track 6)
- Keyboards – Nate Edmonds, Skitch Smith
- Percussion – Craig Derry, Harry Reyes, John Stump
- Vibraphone, backing vocals – Sylvia Robinson
- Special guest appearance – Tito Puente
- Special effects – Billy Jones, Nate Edmonds
- Producer, engineer, mixing – Billy Jones, Nate Edmonds, Sylvia Robinson

== Charts ==
Chart performance for Sugarhill Gang
Chart (1980)	Peak position
Australian Albums (Kent Music Report)	92
Dutch Albums (Album Top 100)	17
US Top R&B/Hip-Hop Albums (Billboard)	32
