= The Quartermaster's Store =

Traditional song

"The Quartermaster's Store" is a traditional song from England. It is Roud Folk Song Index no. 10508. The origins of both tune and words are uncertain. It was sung by British and ANZAC soldiers during World War I, but may be an older song of the prewar British regular army. In those World War I armies, the quartermaster's department was responsible for stores and supplies. The song lists its supposed characteristics, many of them slovenly or unhygienic. The song was known in the United States by the 1930s; it was sung by the Lincoln Battalion, a unit of American volunteers who fought on the republican side in the Spanish Civil War (1936-39). During World War II, the song was popular in the RAF as well as the Army. The song is also known as "The Quartermaster Corps" or "The Quartermaster's Corps".

The song has gained wide popularity outside the military sphere, particularly as a campfire song in the Scouting and Guiding movements. The Barmy Army, supporters of the England cricket team, have been known to sing about England international cricketers Stuart Broad and his father Chris to the tune of "The Quartermaster's Store".

As is common in oral tradition, the words vary widely; and it being a list song, there have been many verses. The military versions are often earthier than those intended for children or teenagers. Two typical military verses are:

There were rats, rats, big as bloody cats,
In the store, in the store.
There were rats, rats, big as bloody cats,
In the Quartermaster's store.

[Chorus:] My eyes are dim, I cannot see,
I have not brought my specs with me,
I have not brought my specs with me.

There was beer, beer, to bring us all good cheer,
In the store, in the store.
There was beer, beer, to bring us all good cheer,
In the Quartermaster's store.

Other popular lines include:

There were snakes, snakes, snakes, as long as garden rakes

There were chips, chips, as big as battleships

and

There was gravy, gravy, enough to float the Navy

The song has been recorded several times:

- c. 1939 – Murgatroyd and Winterbottom (Tommy Handley and Ronald Frankau), British comedians, as a novelty song
- 1940s – Pete Seeger, American folksinger
- 1959? – Les Cleveland and the D-Day Dodgers, New Zealand
- 1960 – The Shadows, British instrumental band, as the B-side of the No. 1 single "Apache"; Columbia DB4484
- 1964 – Burl Ives, American singer, on the album Scouting Along with Burl Ives
- 1979 – Raffi, Canadian singer-lyricist, on the album The Corner Grocery Store, as "The Corner Grocery Store"
- 1985 – The Band of the Royal Corps of Signals, as an item in a musical medley
- Other recordings have been made
