= Apache (instrumental) =

1960 instrumental composed by Jerry Lordan

- A-side of UK single

Single by Bert Weedon
- B-side: "Lonely Guitar"
- Released: July 1960
- Recorded: Early 1960
- Genre: Instrumental rock
- Length: 2:37
- Label: Top Rank JAR-415
- Composer: Jerry Lordan

Bert Weedon singles chronology
| "Twelfth Street Rag" (1960) | "Apache" (1960) | "Sorry Robbie" (1960) |

"Apache" is a song written by English songwriter Jerry Lordan and first recorded by English guitarist Bert Weedon. Lordan played the song on ukulele for English instrumental rock group the Shadows while on tour and, liking the song, the group released their own version which topped the UK Singles Chart for five weeks in mid-1960. The Shadows' guitarist Hank Marvin developed the song's distinctive echo and vibrato sound. After hearing the Shadows' version, Danish guitarist Jørgen Ingmann released a cover of the song in November 1960 which peaked at number 2 on the Billboard Hot 100 in the US.

A 1973 version by the Incredible Bongo Band has been called "hip-hop's national anthem". Although this version was not a hit on release, its long percussion break has been sampled countless times on hip hop and dance tracks since the 1980s. In March 2005, Q magazine placed "Apache" by the Shadows at number 96 on its list of the 100 Greatest Guitar Tracks.

== Composition and original recording ==
English songwriter and composer Jerry Lordan came up with the tune in the late 1950s. Lordan was inspired to write the song after watching the 1954 American western film Apache, saying that he "wanted something noble and dramatic, reflecting the courage and savagery of the Indian Apache warrior Massai, played by Burt Lancaster.

It was originally recorded by British guitarist Bert Weedon in early 1960, but remained unreleased for several months due to promotion and release problems. However, Lordan did not like Weedon's version of the song, as he thought it was too jaunty. For this reason, whilst on tour with Cliff Richard and the Shadows, Lordan played the song on his ukulele to the Shadows, who liked the song and recorded it in June, quickly releasing it in July 1960.

Around the same time as the Shadows' release of "Apache", Weedon's record label Top Rank finally released his version. Reviewing for Disc, Don Nicholl wrote that Weedon "gets the right mood and atmosphere as he works with drums on this Indian item. There's a flute in the background, too – to give the idea for the raiding party's whoops maybe. A dark noise". The single peaked at number 24 on the UK Singles Chart. After the success of the Shadows' version, Hank Marvin and Bruce Welch wrote "Mr. Guitar" for Weedon as a recompense for overshadowing his version of the song.

=== Track listing ===
- 7": Top Rank / JAR-415
1. "Apache" – 2:37
2. "Lonely Guitar" – 2:10

=== Charts ===
| Chart (1960) | Peak position |
|---|---|
| UK Singles (Official Charts) | 24 |

== The Shadows version ==
"Apache"
- Cover of the single released in Germany

Single by The Shadows
- B-side: "Quatermasster's Stores"
- Released: 8 July 1960
- Recorded: 17 June 1960
- Studio: EMI Studios, London
- Genre: Instrumental rock
- Length: 2:56
- Label: Columbia DB 4484
- Composer: Jerry Lordan
- Producer: Norrie Paramor

The Shadows singles chronology
| "Saturday Dance" (1959) | "Apache" (1960) | "Man of Mystery" (1960) |

Alternative release
- One of A-side labels of UK single

=== Recording ===
The recording was done at the EMI Abbey Road Studios in London. Singer and guitarist Joe Brown had bought an Italian-built tape echo unit that he did not like, and gave it to The Shadows' guitarist Hank Marvin, who developed a distinctive sound using it and the whammy bar of his Fender Stratocaster. Bruce Welch borrowed an acoustic Gibson J-200 guitar from Cliff Richard, the heavy melodic bass was performed by Jet Harris, and drums by Tony Meehan. Richard himself played a Chinese drum at the beginning and end to provide an atmosphere of stereotypically Native American music.

=== Release and reception ===
"Apache" was released with the B-side being an instrumental version of the traditional army song "The Quartermaster's Store". The band humorously renamed the song "Quatermasster’s Stores" in reference to the television serial Quatermass and it was arranged by Bill Shepherd.

Record producer and A&R man Norrie Paramor preferred "Quatermasster’s Stores" over "Apache" and wanted it to be released as the A-side. However, he changed his mind after his daughter preferred "Apache".

By 1963 Apache had sold over a million copies in the UK.

It has been cited by a generation of guitarists as inspirational and is considered one of the most influential British rock 45s of the pre-Beatles era. In a 1963 NME article, The Shadows said, "What's the most distinctive sound of our group? We often wondered what it is ourselves. Really, it is the sound we had when we recorded 'Apache' – that kind of Hawaiian sounding lead guitar ... plus the beat".

In March 2005, Q magazine placed "Apache" by the Shadows at number 96 on its list of the 100 Greatest Guitar Tracks.

The Shadows' version of "Apache" was issued as a single in the US in August 1960, but -- as was the case with all Shadows singles -- received minimal attention and did not chart in the US at all. Jorgen Ingmann's version of "Apache" (see below), issued a few months later in both the US and Canada, became the hit version of "Apache" in North America.

=== UK chart history ===
The Shadows' "Apache" entered the UK top 40 on 21 July 1960 at number 35, climbing into the top 20 the following week. A fortnight later, the song rose twelve places to number 3 and, on 25 August, deposed "Please Don't Tease" – on which The Shadows backed Cliff Richard – to begin a five-week run at number 1.

On 29 September, "Apache" dropped to number 2, replaced by "Tell Laura I Love Her" by Ricky Valance. The Shadows version proved to be an enduring hit, enjoying a 19-week run in the top 40 which concluded on 24 November, reappearing for one more week on 8 December. During this run, the group's follow-up single "Man of Mystery"/"The Stranger" peaked at number 5, alongside the number 3 success of "Nine Times Out of Ten" (backing Cliff Richard).

According to the UK Official Charts Company, "Apache" was the 28th best-selling single of the 1960s.

=== Track listing ===
- 7": Columbia / DB 4484
1. "Apache" – 2:56
2. "Quatermasster's Stores" – 2:20

=== Personnel ===
- Hank Marvin – lead guitar
- Bruce Welch – acoustic guitar
- Jet Harris – bass guitar
- Tony Meehan – percussion
- Cliff Richard – Chinese drum

=== Charts ===
| Chart (1960) | Peak position |
|---|---|
| Australia (Kent Music Report) | 4 |
| Austria | 22 |
| Belgium (Ultratop 50 Flanders) | 6 |
| Belgium (Ultratop 50 Wallonia) | 2 |
| France (SNEP) | 2 |
| Ireland (Evening Herald) | 1 |
| Italy (Musica e dischi) | 14 |
| Netherlands (Single Top 100) | 11 |
| New Zealand (Lever Hit Parade) | 1 |
| Spain (Promusicae) | 8 |
| UK Singles (Official Charts) | 1 |
| West Germany (GfK) | 6 |

== Jørgen Ingmann version ==
"Apache"
- Cover of the single released in Denmark

Single by Jørgen Ingmann

from the album Apache
- B-side: "Echo Boogie"
- Released: 1 November 1960
- Recorded: October 1960
- Studio: Metronome Studio, Copenhagen, Denmark
- Genre: Instrumental rock; Space age pop
- Length: 3:00
- Label: Metronome B 1445; ATCO 6184
- Composer: Jerry Lordan
- Producer: Jørgen Ingmann

Jørgen Ingmann singles chronology
| "Gingando" (1960) | "Apache" (1960) | "Pepe" (1961) |

Danish guitarist Jørgen Ingmann recorded a cover of "Apache" in October 1960 after hearing the Shadows' version, which had recently been released in Denmark. Ingmann had been looking for a B-side to his self-penned song "Echo Boogie" and decided that "Apache" would work. He played all instruments on both tracks, as well as mixing and producing them.

=== Release and reception ===
Released in Denmark at the beginning of November by Metronome Records, it was quickly released in the US by ATCO along with a big advertising campaign, where the single was credited as 'Jorgen Ingmann and His Guitar'.

The single entered the US Billboard Hot 100 in the final week of January 1961 and peaked at number two ten weeks later at the beginning of April for two weeks behind "Blue Moon" by the Marcels. In Canada, "Apache" topped the CHUM Chart for two weeks in March 1961. Ingmann would go on to have a smaller hit in North America with "Anna", which peaked at number 54 in the US and number 34 in Canada June 1961.

Cliff Richard has said that "Ingmann put in a few tricky bits, but essentially it was a cover job. If the Shads had made the charts there [in the US] with 'Apache', things might have been very different for us".

=== Track listing ===
- 7": ATCO / 6184 (US and Canada)
1. "Apache" – 3:00
2. "Echo Boogie" – 3:13

=== Charts ===
| Chart (1961) | Peak position |
|---|---|
| Canada (CHUM) | 1 |
| Chile | 2 |
| Finland (Suomen virallinen lista) | 2 |
| US Billboard Hot 100 | 2 |
| US Hot R&B Singles (Billboard) | 9 |
| US Cash Box Top 100 | 4 |
| US R&B Top 50 (Cash Box) | 9 |
| West Germany (GfK) | 6 |

== Incredible Bongo Band version ==
"Apache"

Song by Incredible Bongo Band

from the album Bongo Rock
- Released: June 1973
- Recorded: 1973
- Studio: Can-Base Studios, Vancouver, Canada
- Genre: Funk
- Length: 4:54
- Label: Pride (MGM)
- Composer: Jerry Lordan
- Producers: Michael Viner; Perry Botkin Jr.

A 1973 version by Michael Viner and a funk group called the Incredible Bongo Band added a bongo drum introduction and included more percussion. The drum break was played by Jim Gordon. Although this version was not a hit on its initial release, it became heavily sampled in early hip hop music, including by Afrika Bambaataa, who cited its influence. It has been sampled by hip hop performers such as The Sugarhill Gang, L.L. Cool J, The Roots and Nas, techno performers The Future Sound of London and Moby, and drum and bass acts J Majik and Goldie.

The 2013 documentary Sample This, directed by Dan Forrer and narrated by Gene Simmons, recounts the story of The Incredible Bongo Band and its recording of "Apache". In 2022, Rolling Stone ranked Incredible Bongo Band's version of the song number 31 in their list of the "200 Greatest Dance Songs of All Time".

=== The Sugarhill Gang version ===
"Apache"
- German 12" single

Single by The Sugarhill Gang

from the album 8th Wonder
- B-side: "Rapper's Delight"
- Released: November 1981
- Recorded: 1981
- Studio: Sweet Mountain Studios, Englewood, New Jersey
- Genre: Old-school hip hop; electro
- Length: 3:57 (single); 6:09 (album)
- Label: Sugar Hill
- Songwriters: Jerry Lordan; Sylvia Robinson; Cheryl Cook; Michael Wright
- Producer: Sylvia Robinson

The Sugarhill Gang singles chronology
| "Showdown" (1981) | "Apache" (1981) | "The Lover in You" (1982) |

In 1981, the American rap group known as the Sugarhill Gang covered the Incredible Bongo Band's version of the song on its second album, 8th Wonder (1981). In 1982, this version peaked at No. 53 on the US Billboard Hot 100, No. 51 on the Billboard Dance chart, and No. 13 on the US R&B chart.

== Notable cover versions ==
- In February 1961, Sonny James released a vocal music version, which was produced in Nashville by Chet Atkins and was review-rated as a Spotlight Winner in Billboard. It peaked at number 87 on the Billboard Hot 100 and number 23 on the retrospective Australian Kent Music Report.
- Dave Allan and the Arrows released a cover as "Apache '65". It peaked at number 64 on the Billboard Hot 100.
- In November 1970, English rock group the Edgar Broughton Band released a single "Apache Drop Out", which combined "Apache" with a version of Captain Beefheart's "Drop Out Boogie". The highly unorthodox single reached number 33 on the UK Singles Chart and number 42 in Germany.
- In October 1972, the Moog-based band of session musicians Hot Butter released a cover version of "Apache" as follow-up to their hit "Popcorn". It peaked at number 51 on the UK Singles Chart and number 37 in Germany.
- In 1987, Dutch band Janse Bagge Bend released a version titled "Awpatsje (Apache)", which peaked at number 83 on the Dutch Single Top 100 chart.
- In 2005, the German band Scooter covered this song as an instrumental for the album Who's Got The Last Laugh Now? in a techno version. Later that year, a single was released which combined elements of "Apache" and "Rock Bottom" from the same album, known as "Apache Rocks the Bottom!". This later appeared on the second disc of the UK edition of its 2008 album Jumping All Over the World. The single was a top-five hit in Denmark and Finland and a top-thirty hit in Germany and Austria.

== Interpolations ==
- David Bowie borrowed part of the melody of Apache for the chorus of the song "How Does the Grass Grow?" from his 2013 album The Next Day.

== Soundtrack appearances ==
- Various versions are used in commercials for Jardiance.

== Minnesota Lynx ==
The Minnesota Lynx of the WNBA adopted "Apache" as the unofficial team anthem in 2007. Following victories, the team would dance to the song at center court. For the first home game of the team's first WNBA Finals appearance, the team brought in the Sugarhill Gang to perform the song at halftime.
