= Scouting Along with Burl Ives =

- 1964 LP album cover

Studio album by Burl Ives
- Released: 1964
- Genre: Folk
- Length: 30:08
- Label: Columbia

Professional ratings
Review scores
Source	Rating
Allmusic	2/5 stars

Scouting Along with Burl Ives is a 1964 album, subtitled The Official Boy Scout Album. Ives was commissioned by the Boy Scouts of America to make this album, which is now available on CD at ScoutStuff.org. Ives is accompanied by a choir of boys and an orchestra directed by Sid Bass. Greg Adams of Allmusic writes, "Scouting Along With Burl Ives is essentially a work-for-hire children's album made for the Boy Scouts and is therefore of limited appeal, but the professionalism and enthusiasm Ives and Bass exhibit are admirable." The album features folk and other songs that might be sung around a campfire. The album is unique in that it also provided a short bio of Ives and his early affiliation with professional football.

Ives had a long-standing relationship with the Boy Scouts of America. He was a Lone Scout before that group merged with the Boy Scouts of America in 1924. The collection of his papers at the New York Library for the Performing Arts includes a photograph of Ives being "inducted" into the Boy Scouts in 1966. Ives received the organization's Silver Buffalo Award, its highest honor. The certificate for the award is hanging on the wall of the Scouting Museum in Valley Forge, Pennsylvania. Ives often performed at the quadrennial Boy Scouts of America jamboree, including the 1981 jamboree at Fort A.P. Hill in Virginia, where he shared the stage with the Oak Ridge Boys. There is a 1977 sound recording of Ives being interviewed by Boy Scouts at the National Jamboree at Moraine State Park, Pennsylvania; on this tape he also sings and talks about Scouting, teaching, etc. Ives is also the narrator of a 28-minute film about the 1977 National Jamboree. In the film, which was produced by the Boy Scouts of America, Ives "shows the many ways in which Scouting provides opportunities for young people to develop character and expand their horizons."

== Track listing ==
1. "Boy Scouts of America" - 1:44
2. "The Quartermaster's Store" - 1:59
3. "The Herdsman" - 1:13
4. "I Points to Mineself" - 3:19
5. "Campfire Medley" - 1:48
6. "I'm Happy When I'm Hiking" - 1:31
7. "Three Jolly Fisherman" - 1:31
8. "Now the Day Is Over" - 2:18
9. "We're All Together Again" - 1:15
10. "On My Honor" - 2:28
11. "Ham and Eggs" - 2:07
12. "Hi Ho! Nobody Home" - 1:25
13. "Camp Menu Song" - 1:59
14. "Clementine" - 1:52
15. "She'll Be Comin' Round the Mountain" - 1:53
16. "Taps" - 1:46

== See also ==
- Scouting in popular culture
