= Sha-Rock =

American rapper

MC Sha-Rock
- Born: Sharon Green; October 25, 1962 (age 64); Wilmington, North Carolina, U.S.
- Origin: The Bronx, New York, U.S.
- Genre: Hip hop
- Occupation: Rapper
- Years active: 1977–present
- Label: Enjoy Records Sugar Hill Records
- Website: MCShaRockOnline.com

Sharon Green (born October 25, 1962), also known as MC Sha-Rock, is considered the "first female rapper" or emcee. Born in Wilmington, North Carolina, she grew up in the South Bronx, New York City during the earliest years of hip hop culture and rap music. Within the hip-hop community she has been referred to as the "Mother of the Mic". As a member of the Funky 4 + 1, one of the first hip-hop crews to appear on national television, her style influenced notable rappers like MC Lyte and DMC (born Darryl McDaniels) of Run-DMC.

== Career ==
Sha-Rock began as a local b-girl, or breakdancer, in the early days of South Bronx hip hop scene and culture in the late 1970s. The Funky 4 + 1, Sha-Rock being the plus one, had their first hit with the 12-inch "Rapping and Rocking the House" on Sugarhill Records (1979), which was followed by "That's the Joint" (1980). As a pioneer affiliated with the Zulu Nation, MC Sha-Rock inspired a style of rapping made famous by Run DMC and called the "echo chamber".

In 2010, Green published a book about her experiences titled “The Story of the Beginning and End of the First Hip Hop Female MC: Luminary Icon Sha-Rock.” The book recounts her experiences and challenges of becoming an emcee and her time as a member of The Funky 4 + 1.

On August 4, 2009, Sha-Rock was presented an award for "Women in Hip Hop All Female Rapathon and All Pioneer Luminary MC Award" presented by the Hip Hop cultural center of Harlem. At the ceremony Sha-Rock said "that everyone please embrace the culture and make sure that you really understand that Hip Hop is really not just about rap and profit, it's about peace, unity and having fun. Listening to music, enjoying one another and being safe".

== Legacy ==
Of all members of the Funky 4 + 1, pop critic Robert Christgau reserved special praise for Green in his review of "That's the Joint", "Quick tradeoffs and clamorous breaks vary the steady-flow rhyming of the individual MCs, and when it comes to Sha-Rock, Miss Plus One herself, who needs variation?"

On February 14, 1981, The Funky 4 + 1 were introduced as New York City "street rappers" from the Bronx along with headlining musical guests Blondie with its lead singer Debbie Harry on Saturday Night Live. The Funky 4 + 1's appearance reflected a local connection that introduced the uptown musical youth of the Bronx and Harlem to the downtown Lower East Side scenes of graffiti art and music that was represented with the original hip-hop artists playing themselves in the 1983 film Wild Style by Charlie Ahearn.

This creative link between various youthful artists was boosted by Fab Five Freddy and Ruza Blue, nicknamed "Kool Lady Blue", who curated acts at the Roxy NYC nightclub, which featured early hip-hop DJs and breakdancers. Sha-Rock has received the honorary award from the Council of the City of New York.

== Personal life ==
Sha-Rock was inducted as an honorary member of Sigma Gamma Rho on July 24, 2026, during the sorority's 61st Biennial Boule in Tampa, Florida.
