= West Street Mob =

American boogie and electro band

- Origin: United States
- Genres: Hip-hop; boogie; funk; electro
- Instruments: Vocoders; vocals
- Years active: 1981–1984
- Label: Sugar Hill
- Past members: Joey Robinson, Jr. (deceased); Warren Moore; Sabrina Gillison

West Street Mob were an American boogie and electro band, active between 1981 and 1984, best known for their 1983 song "Break Dance — Electric Boogie." The band comprised Joey Robinson, Jr., Warren Moore and singer Sabrina Gillison.

== History ==
In 1981, West Street Mob recorded their eponymous album, which peaked at No. 57 on the Billboard Black Albums chart. The single "Let's Dance" peaked at No. 18 on the Black Singles chart and No. 22 on the Dance chart.

In 1983. the band released its second album, Break Dance – Electric Boogie. The title track contains a sample of Incredible Bongo Band's 1973 recording of "Apache," written by Jerry Lordan.

West Street Mob also recorded two singles that were not included on either of their two albums, "Ooh Baby" and "Sing a Simple Song."

The band is well known for "Break Dance – Electric Boogie" being featured in the first of Judson Laipply's Evolution of Dance videos.

Joseph "Joey" Robinson Jr., son of Sugar Hill Records founder Sylvia Robinson, died of cancer on July 11, 2015, in Tenafly, New Jersey, at the age of 53.

== Discography ==
=== Studio albums ===
Year	Album	Record label	Chart positions		
Year	Album	Record label	US	US R&B	UK
1981	West Street Mob	Sugar Hill	—	No. 56	—
1983	Break Dance – Electric Boogie	Sugar Hill	—	—	—

- "—" denotes the single failed to chart

=== Singles ===
Year	Single	Record label	Chart positions			
Year	Single	Record label	US	US R&B	US Dance	UK
1981	"Let's Dance (Make Your Body Move)" ^{C}	Sugar Hill	88	18	22	—
1981	"Got To Give It Up"	Sugar Hill	—	—	—	—
1982	"Ooh Baby"	Sugar Hill	—	55	—	—
1982	"Sing a Simple Song"	Sugar Hill	89	44	—	—
1983	"Break Dance – Electric Boogie"	Sugar Hill	—	37	52	64
1983	"Mosquito"	Sugar Hill	—	—	—	—

- "—" denotes the single failed to chart
- ^{C} also peaked at No. 95 on the Cashbox pop chart.
