= Crash Crew =

American hip hop group

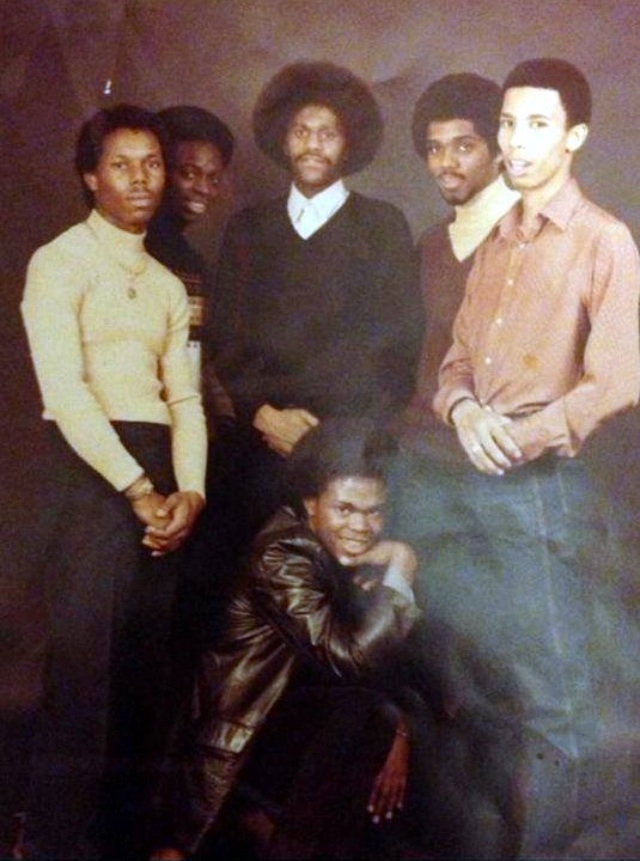
- Crash Crew

Background information
- Origin: New York City, New York, United States
- Genres: Hip hop
- Years active: 1977–present
- Label: Sugar Hill
- Members: G. Man; La Shubee; Barry B-Stro; Ek Mike C. Reggie Reg
- Past members: DJ Daryll C (deceased)

Crash Crew is an American early hip-hop group who recorded for Mike and Dave Records in 1980 and then signed to Sugar Hill Records. The group, based in Harlem, Lincoln Projects New York City, consisted of members DJ Daryll C. (who died in 1999 due to diabetes), G. Man, La Shubee, Barry B-Stro, Michael EK Shahid (Ek Mike C), and Reggie Reg. Later in their career, they were briefly managed by Jimmy Spice, who also briefly managed Jesse D (Force MDs).

The Crash Crew were some of the first Emcees to sing on records and during live performances. The group has performed with some of the biggest names in Hip Hop. According to JayQuan.com, the six grew up in the surroundings of Lincoln projects (in Harlem, New York), and in 1977 the group was created.

In 1980, they recorded their first single under the moniker "Disco Dave and the Force of the 5 MC's". The single, "High Powered Rap", was released on Mike & Dave Records. That same year, the group signed to Sugar Hill Records and released several singles including "We Wanna Rock", "Breaking Bells (Take Me to the Mardi Gras)", and "On the Radio". 1982's "Breaking Bells (Take Me to the Mardi Gras)" was created around the sampled drum break from Bob James's instrumental cover of Paul Simon's "Take Me to the Mardi Gras".

LL Cool J's "Rock The Bells" radio station, dedicated a section of its website to the Crash Crew for their historic hip hop accomplishments.

== Discography ==
=== Albums ===
- The Crash Crew (1984)
- High Powered Rappers (1996)
- Back to the Old School 2 – We Are Emcees (2001)

=== Singles ===
- "High Power Rap" (as Disco Dave and the Force of 5 MC's) (1980)
- "We Want To Rock" (1981)
- "Breaking Bells (Take Me To the Mardi Gras)" (1982)
- "On the Radio" (1983)
- "We Are Known As Emcees (We Turn Party's Out)" (1983)
- "Here We Are (Waiting For You)" (1984)
- "2-4-6-8" / "Here We Are" (1985)
- "The Crash Crew Is Back" / "Summer Fun" (1995)
- "The Real Hip Hop" / "Champagne Flights" (1996)
- "High Powered Rappers" (1980)
