= The Sugarhill Gang =

American old-school hip-hop group

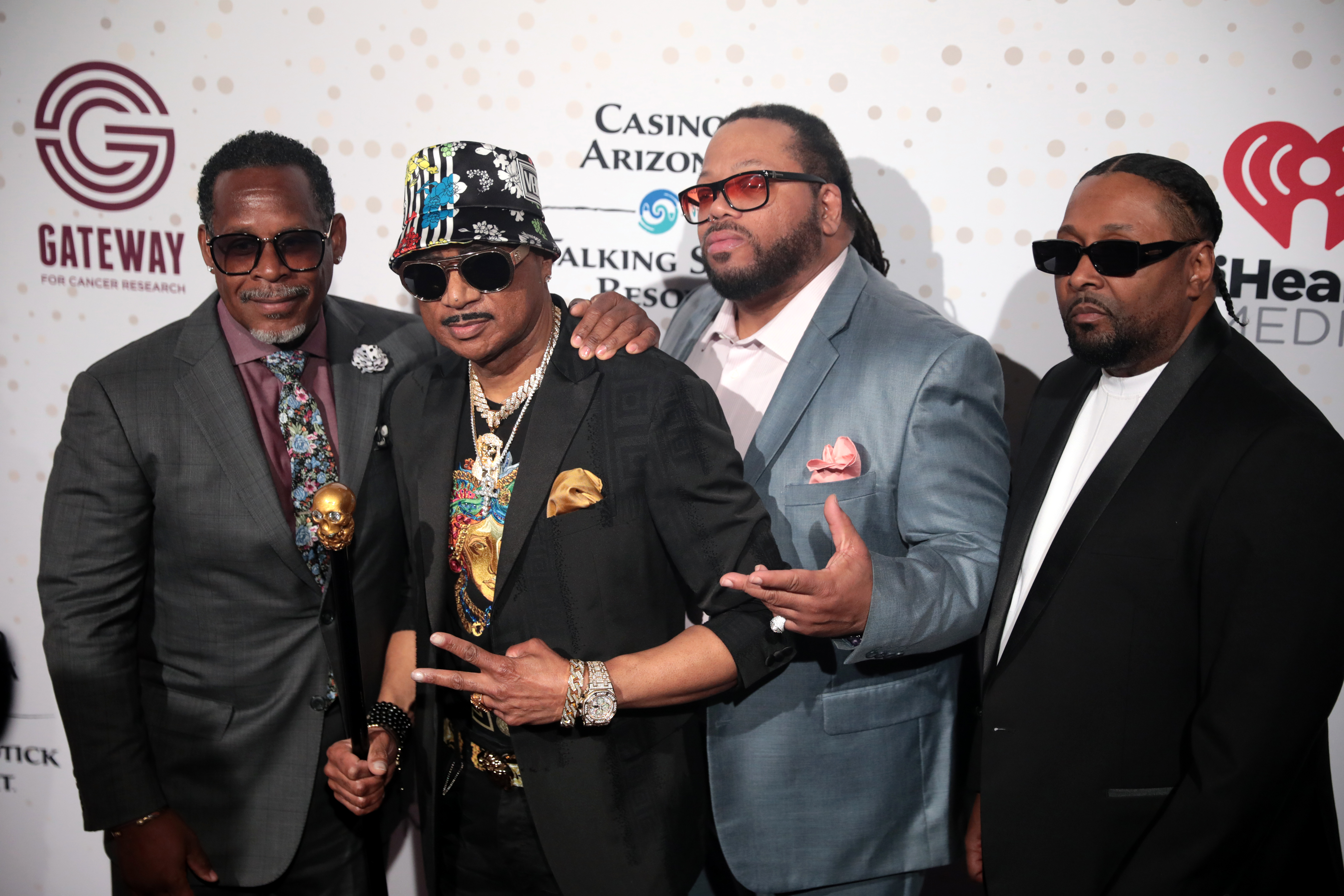
- The Sugarhill Gang in 2023

Background information
- Origin: Englewood, New Jersey, U.S.
- Genre: Old-school hip-hop
- Years active: 1979–1985; 1994–present
- Labels: Kid Rhino; Sugar Hill
- Members: Wonder Mike; Master Gee; Hen Dogg; DJ T-Dynasty; Ethiopian King
- Past members: Big Bank Hank

The Sugarhill Gang is an American old-school hip-hop group formed in Englewood, New Jersey, in 1979. Their hit "Rapper's Delight", released the same year they were formed, was the first rap single to become a top 40 hit on the Billboard Hot 100, reaching a peak position of number 36 on January 12, 1980. This was the trio's only U.S. hit, though they would have further success in Europe until the mid-1980s. The trio reformed in 1994 and embarked on a world tour in 2016.

The group are considered hip-hop pioneers. Their old-school hip-hop sound combined rapping with samples from disco, funk and soul. This paved the way for electro and East Coast hip-hop.

== History ==
=== Formation and early years ===
The members, all from Englewood, New Jersey, consisted of Henry "Big Bank Hank" Jackson, Michael "Wonder Mike" Wright and Guy "Master Gee" O'Brien. The three were assembled into a group by producer Sylvia Robinson, who founded Sugar Hill Records with her husband, record producer Joe Robinson. The group and the record company were named after the Sugar Hill, Harlem, neighborhood.

Their 1979 hit "Rapper's Delight" was the first rap single to become a top 40 hit on the Billboard Hot 100. "Rapper's Delight" is now considered one of the most important rap songs of all time. The group never had another top 40 U.S. hit, though it had multiple European hits, such as "Apache", "8th Wonder" (which was performed on the American music show Soul Train in 1981), "Rapper's Reprise (Jam Jam)", and "Showdown" (with the Furious Five). The trio wound down over the next five years and disbanded in 1985.

=== Later years ===
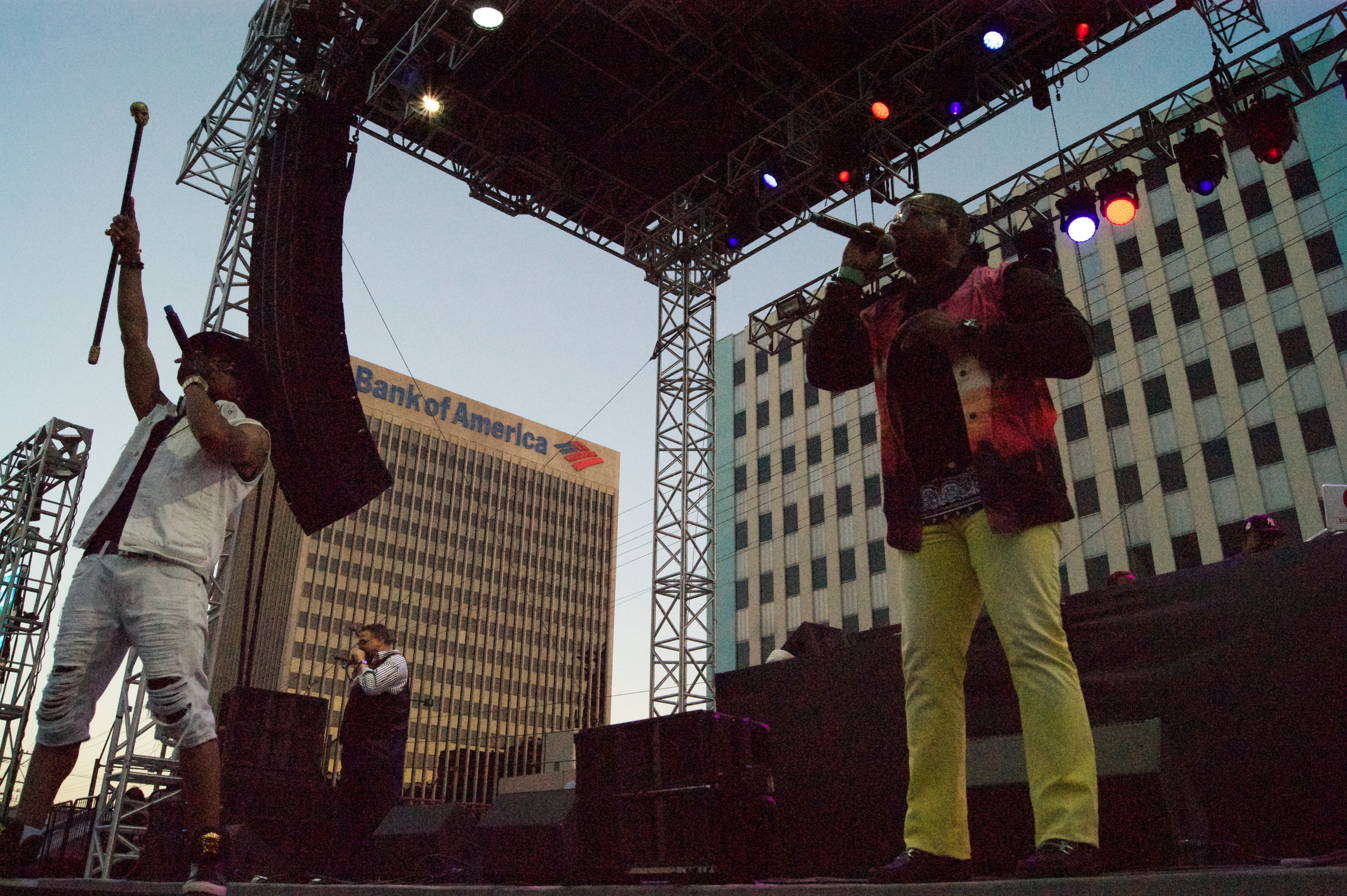
The Sugarhill Gang on Tour, 2016

In 1990, the group briefly reunited to perform during the "RapMania: The Roots of Rap" concert at the Apollo Theater in New York City.

Joey Robinson, Sylvia Robinson's son, reformed the Sugarhill Gang in 1994. The group recorded Jump On It!, a hip-hop children's album, in 1999. O'Brien had not rejoined the group, and at some point, Robinson started performing under O'Brien's stage name "Master Gee". This frustrated O'Brien and Wright, the latter of whom—as Robinson's bandmate—had tried to convince Robinson not to use the name. Later, Robinson trademarked both the names "Master Gee" and "Wonder Mike". O'Brien and Wright went to court to retrieve the rights to their names.

Wright left Sugar Hill Records in 2005, along with his colleague, producer Henry "Hen Dogg" Williams. The two reunited with O'Brien and started performing as "Rapper's Delight Featuring Wonder Mike and Master Gee". This was due to Joey Robinson's performing with Jackson under the name "Sugarhill Gang" simultaneously, and Sugar Hill Records claiming copyright to that name.

Having reacquired the rights to the name "Sugarhill Gang", the group released "Lala Song" with French record producer and DJ Bob Sinclar in 2009.

On November 11, 2014, Jackson died at the age of 58 after a long battle with cancer.

In 2016, Wright, O'Brien and Williams embarked on their first world tour in over a decade under the name the Sugarhill Gang. During this time they performed as the Sugarhill Gang for the Art of Rap festival tour and at V Festival in Hylands Park and Weston Park in the UK. Other places included the Clockenflap Festival in Hong Kong on November 27, 2016, and they headlined at the Depot in the Park Festival in Cardiff, United Kingdom on August 5, 2017. In July 2019, they played the North Nibley Festival in England.

In 2019, the Sugarhill Gang celebrated the 40th anniversary of the release of "Rapper's Delight" and the group's formation. They went on a worldwide tour called Rapper's Delight 40th Anniversary World Tour. The gang made new music in early 2019. The tour lasted from May 24 to July 26, 2019. On October 25, 2019, the group performed "Rapper's Delight" on Jimmy Kimmel Live!.

As of 2024, the group consists of Wright, O'Brien, Williams, DJ T-Dynasty and Bar Shon "Ethiopian King". Since 2025, Wright has been unable to travel and therefore no longer tours with the group.

== Discography ==
The Sugarhill Gang discography
- Studio albums: 5
- Compilation albums: 9
- Singles: 15

The discography of the Sugarhill Gang includes five studio albums, nine compilations and fifteen singles.

=== Studio albums ===
Title	Album details	Peak chart positions				
Title	Album details	US	US R&B	AUS	NLD	NZ
Sugarhill Gang	Released: 1980; Label: Sugar Hill	—	32	92	17	—
8th Wonder	Released: 1981; Label: Sugar Hill	50	15	—	—	44
Rappin' Down Town	Released: 1983; Label: Sugar Hill	—	—	—	—	—
Livin' in the Fast Lane	Released: 1984; Label: Sugar Hill	—	—	—	—	—
Jump On It!	Released: 1999; Label: Kid Rhino	—	—	—	—	—
"—" denotes releases that did not chart.

=== Compilation albums ===
- Sugarhill Gang Greatest Hits (1984)
- Boyz from Da Hill (1994)
- Ain't Nothin' but a Party (1998)
- Hip Hop Anniversary Europe Tour: Sugarhill Gang Live (2008)

=== Singles ===
Title	Year	Peak chart positions										Certifications	Album
Title	Year	US	US R&B	AUS	BEL (FL)	CAN	GER	NLD	NZ	SWI	UK	Certifications	Album
"Rapper's Delight"	1979	36	4	37	2	1	3	2	18	2	3	BPI: Platinum	Sugarhill Gang
"Rapper's Reprise"	1980	—	—	—	—	—	—	—	—	—	—		Sugarhill Gang
"8th Wonder"	1980	82	15	—	—	—	—	—	—	—	—		8th Wonder
"Apache"	1981	53	13	—	33	—	—	—	—	—	—		8th Wonder
"Showdown" (credited as The Furious Five meets The Sugarhill Gang)	1981	—	49	—	—	—	—	—	—	—	—		8th Wonder
"The Lover in You"	1982	—	55	—	—	—	—	—	—	—	54		Rappin' Down Town
"The Word Is Out"	1983	—	71	—	—	—	—	—	—	—	—		Rappin' Down Town
"Be a Winner"	1983	—	—	—	—	—	—	—	—	—	—		Rappin' Down Town
"Kick It Live from 9 to 5"	1983	—	50	—	—	—	—	—	—	—	—		Rappin' Down Town
"Livin' in the Fast Lane"	1984	—	78	—	—	—	—	—	—	—	—		Livin' in the Fast Lane
"Troy" / "Girls"	1984	—	—	—	—	—	—	—	—	—	—		Livin' in the Fast Lane
"The Down Beat"	1985	—	—	—	—	—	—	—	—	—	—		Non-album singles
"Work, Work the Body"	1985	—	—	—	—	—	—	—	—	—	—		Non-album singles
"Lala Song" (credited as Bob Sinclar featuring The Sugarhill Gang)	2009	—	—	—	9	—	55	7	—	68	—		Born in 69
"—" denotes releases that did not chart.

== See also ==
- List of 1970s one-hit wonders in the United States
