= Rapper's Delight =

1979 single by The Sugarhill Gang

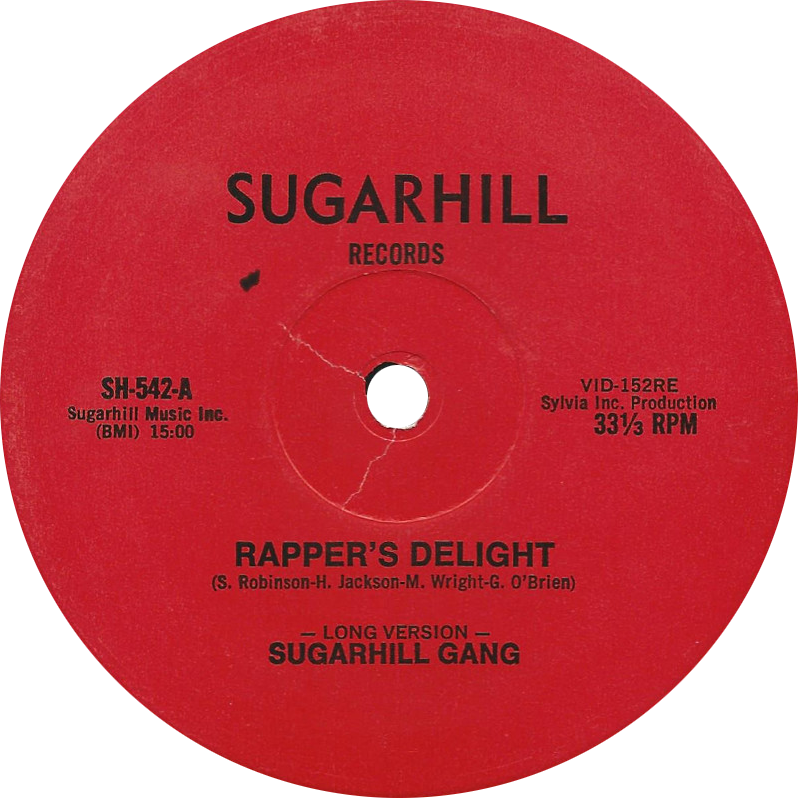
- Red side-A label variant of the 1979 US 12-inch single not crediting Chic's song

Single by the Sugarhill Gang

from the album Sugarhill Gang
- Released: September 16, 1979
- Recorded: August 2, 1979
- Genre: Disco-rap; disco; funk
- Length: 3:55 (single version); 4:55 (album version); 5:05 (7" single version); 6:30 (12" short version); 7:07 (long single version); 14:37 (12" long version)
- Label: Sugar Hill
- Songwriters: Bernard Edwards; Nile Rodgers; Sylvia Robinson (uncredited); Henry Jackson (uncredited); Michael Wright (uncredited); Guy O'Brien (uncredited); Curtis Brown (uncredited); Alan Hawkshaw (uncredited)
- Producer: Sylvia Robinson

The Sugarhill Gang singles chronology
"Rapper's Delight" (1979)	"Rapper's Reprise" (1980)

Music video
- "Rapper's Delight" on YouTube

"Rapper's Delight" is a 1979 rap song that serves as the debut single of American hip-hop trio the Sugarhill Gang, produced by Sylvia Robinson. Although it was shortly preceded by the Fatback Band's "King Tim III (Personality Jock)", "Rapper's Delight" is credited for introducing rap music to a wide audience, reaching the top 40 in the United States, as well as the top three in the United Kingdom and number one in Canada. It was a prototype for various types of rap music. The track interpolates Chic's "Good Times", resulting in Chic's Nile Rodgers and Bernard Edwards threatening to sue Sugar Hill Records for copyright infringement; a settlement was reached that gave the two songwriting credits. It also interpolates Love De-Luxe's "Here Comes That Sound Again". The track was recorded in a single take. There are five mixes of the song.

"Rapper's Delight" was ranked at number 251 on Rolling Stone magazine's list of the "500 Greatest Songs of All Time" in 2010, and number two on both VH1's "100 Greatest Rap Songs" and Rolling Stone's "100 Greatest Hip-Hop Songs of All Time" lists. It is also included on NPR's list of the 100 most important American musical works of the 20th century. It was preserved in the National Recording Registry by the Library of Congress in 2011 for being "culturally, historically, or aesthetically significant".

"Rapper's Delight" is considered by many to be the first commercial rap song in history. In 2014, the record was inducted into the Grammy Hall of Fame.

== Background ==
In late 1978, Debbie Harry suggested that Chic's Nile Rodgers join her and Chris Stein at a hip-hop event, which at the time was a communal space taken over by teenagers with boombox stereos playing various pieces of music that performers would break dance to. Rodgers experienced this event the first time himself at a high school in the Bronx. On September 20 and 21, 1979, Blondie and Chic were playing concerts with the Clash in New York at the Palladium. When Chic started playing "Good Times", rapper Fab Five Freddy and the members of the Sugarhill Gang ("Big Bank Hank" Jackson, "Wonder Mike" Wright, and "Master Gee" O'Brien), jumped up on stage and started freestyling with the band. A few weeks later, Rodgers was on the dance floor of New York club Leviticus and heard the DJ play a song which opened with Bernard Edwards' bass line from Chic's "Good Times". Rodgers approached the DJ who said he was playing a record he had just bought that day in Harlem. The song turned out to be an early version of "Rapper's Delight", which also included a scratched version of the song's string section. Rodgers and Edwards immediately threatened legal action over copyright, which resulted in a settlement and their being credited as co-writers. Rodgers claims that this is the first and only time ever he resisted one of his records from being sampled. He admitted that he was originally upset with the song but later declared it to be "one of his favorite songs of all time" and his favorite of all the tracks that sampled (or in this instance interpolated) Chic. He also stated: "As innovative and important as 'Good Times' was, 'Rapper's Delight' was just as much, if not more so." Rodgers would sometimes rap sections of "Rapper's Delight" when playing "Good Times" live with Chic.

A substantial portion of the early stanzas of the song's lyrics was borrowed by Jackson from Grandmaster Caz (Curtis Brown) who had loaned his 'book' to him—these include a namecheck for "Casanova Fly", which was Caz's full stage name. According to Wonder Mike, he had heard the phrase "hip-hop" from a cousin, leading to the opening line of "Hip-hop, hippie to the hippie, to the hip-hip-hop and you don't stop", while he described "To the bang-bang boogie, say up jump the boogie to the rhythm of the boogie, the beat" as "basically a spoken drum roll. I liked the percussive sound of the letter B". The line "Now what you hear is not a test, I'm rappin' to the beat", was inspired by the introduction to The Outer Limits ("There is nothing wrong with your television set. Do not attempt to adjust the picture"). Before the "Good Times" background starts, the intro to the recording is an interpolation of "Here Comes That Sound Again" by British studio group Love De-Luxe, a disco hit in 1979.

According to Oliver Wang, author of the 2003 Classic Material: The Hip-Hop Album Guide, recording artist and Sugar Hill Records owner Sylvia Robinson had trouble finding anyone willing to record a rap song. Most of the rappers who performed in clubs did not want to record, as many practitioners believed the style was for live performances only. It is said that Robinson and her son Joey overheard Big Bank Hank in a pizza parlor. According to Master Gee, Hank auditioned for Robinson in front of the pizza parlor where he worked, while Gee himself auditioned in Robinson's car. A live band was used to record most of the backing track, including members of the group Positive Force: Albert Pittman, Bernard Roland, Moncy Smith and Bryan Horton.

Chip Shearin claimed during a 2010 interview that he was the bass player on the track. At the age of 17, he had visited a friend in New Jersey. The friend knew Robinson, who needed some musicians for various recordings, including "Rapper's Delight". Shearin's job on the song was to play the bass for 15 minutes straight, with no mistakes. He was paid $70 but later went on to perform with Sugarhill Gang in concert. Shearin described the session this way:

The drummer and I were sweating bullets because that's a long time. And this was in the days before samplers and drum machines, when real humans had to play things. ... Sylvia said, 'I've got these kids who are going to talk real fast over it; that's the best way I can describe it.'

== Chart performance ==
"Rapper's Delight" peaked at number 36 in January 1980 on the US Billboard Hot 100 chart, number four on the Billboard Hot Soul Singles chart in December 1979. The song was much more successful internationally, reaching number one on the Canadian Top Singles chart in January 1980, number one on the Dutch Top 40 and number three on the UK Singles Chart. In 1980, the song was the anchor of the group's first album Sugarhill Gang.

It was the first top 40 song to be available only as a 12-inch extended version in the US. Early pressings (very few) were released with a red label and black print on Sugar Hill Records, along with a 7-inch 45 rpm single (which is very rare). Later pressings had the more common blue label, in orange colored "roulette style" sleeves, fashioned after the label for Roulette Records; Roulette's Morris Levy and reputed mobster Tony Riviera had invested in Sugar Hill. Even later pressings were issued in the more common blue sleeves with the Sugarhill Records logo. In Europe, however, it was released on the classic 7-inch single format on French pop label Vogue, with a shorter version of the song. It was this 7-inch single that reached number one in the Dutch chart. The song ranked number 251 on Rolling Stone magazine's 2004 list of "500 Greatest Songs of All Time".

A British version of the song, with rewritten lyrics, was recorded for the song's 25th anniversary in 2004 by an ensemble of performers including Rodney P, Chester P, Kano, Simone, Yungun, Sway, J2K, Swiss, Baby Blue, MC Skibadee, Luke Skys and MC D.

== Music videos ==
The Sugar Hill Gang appeared on the syndicated Soap Factory Disco Show in late 1979, and their performance later became the song's official music video. The group's performance on the Palisades Park-based program demonstrates the significant overlap between early hip-hop and disco of the late 1970s. Alternate music videos exist. One appears to have been recorded by Dutch broadcasting company AVRO at a hotel pool in early 1980. The song was also used in "Cog", a 2003 Honda advertisement.

== Personnel ==
- Michael "Wonder Mike" Wright – vocals
- Curtis "Grandmaster Caz" Brown – writer
- Henry "Big Bank Hank" Jackson – vocals
- Guy "Master Gee" O'Brien – vocals
- Bernard Roland or Chip Shearin – electric bass
- Albert Pittman or Brian Morgan – electric guitar
- Moncy Smith – piano
- Bryan Horton – drums
- Sylvia Robinson – additional vocals, vibraphone, and production
- Billy Jones – engineer
- Phil Austin – mastering, original US vinyl release

== Charts ==
=== Weekly charts ===
Chart (1979–1980)	Peak position
Australia (ARIA)	37
Austria (Ö3 Austria Top 40)	5
Belgium (Ultratop 50 Flanders)	2
Canada Top Singles (RPM)	1
France (IFOP)	2
Ireland (IRMA)	14
Italy (Musica e dischi)	10
Netherlands (Dutch Top 40)	1
Netherlands (Single Top 100)	2
New Zealand (Recorded Music NZ)	18
Norway (VG-lista)	2
South Africa (Springbok Radio)	3
Spain (AFE)	1
Sweden (Sverigetopplistan)	2
Switzerland (Schweizer Hitparade)	2
UK Singles (Official Charts)	3
US Billboard Hot 100	36
West Germany (GfK)	3

=== Year-end charts ===
Chart (1980)	Peak position
Canada Top Singles (RPM)	27
France (IFOP)	33
Italy (FIMI)	51
Spain (AFE)	4

== Certifications and sales ==
Region	Certification	Certified units/sales
Canada (Music Canada)	Platinum	249,000
France	—	300,000
Germany	—	100,000
Netherlands (NVPI)	Gold	100,000^{^}
New Zealand (RMNZ)	Gold	15,000^{‡}
Philippines	—	100,000
Spain (Promusicae)	Gold	25,000^{^}
United Kingdom (BPI)	Platinum	600,000^{‡}
United States	—	1,300,000
Summaries
Worldwide	—	5,000,000
^{^} Shipments figures based on certification alone.^{‡} Sales+streaming figures based on certification alone.

== Legacy ==
The New York Times columnist Charles M. Blow recalled his memories of the song, hearing it in the rural South: "It sounded revolutionary, even when I was a child, or perhaps especially when I was a child. And it was. It was fierce and fun, simultaneously foreign and familiar." He added:

Listen to "Rapper's Delight", and you hear a lightweight, joyous anthem. But it is a rough-hewn joy, miraculously born out of the struggle and pain of the Black experience. Struggle and pain are often a kiln for creativity, and that has meant that much of American culture is born of the story of Black American life.

The song was remade by rap supergroup Def Squad as "Def Squad Delite", on their 1998 album El Niño.

The song also appears on the soundtrack of several video games. The song is included in Thrasher Presents Skate and Destroy, the long single version is featured in Tony Hawk's Underground 2, while the full version (albeit censored) appears in MLB 2K10. It also appears in Forza Horizon 4 on one of the game's radio stations. A cover of the song is on the track list for Just Dance 2024 Edition.

The chorus of the 2002 international hit "The Ketchup Song (Aserejé)" by Las Ketchup from their album Hijas del Tomate is a Spanish gibberish version of Wonder Mike's part in "Rapper's Delight".

== See also ==
- List of 1970s one-hit wonders in the United States
