= Wonder Mike =

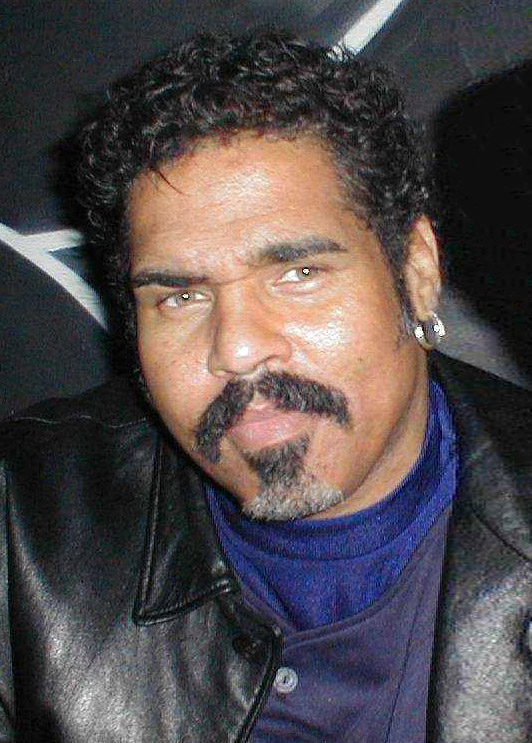

Background information
- Born: Michael Anthony Wright; April 30, 1957 (age 69); Englewood, New Jersey, U.S.
- Genres: Hip-hop
- Occupation: Rapper
- Years active: 1972–present
- Labels: Kid Rhino; Sugar Hill
- Member of: The Sugarhill Gang

Michael Anthony Wright (born April 30, 1957), known professionally as Wonder Mike, is an American hip-hop recording artist and member of the Sugarhill Gang. The group was part of the hip hop movement in the 1970s and 1980s.

== Career ==
Wonder Mike is best known for being a member of the Sugarhill Gang, the first hip-hop act to produce a record, the 1979 single "Rapper's Delight".

As of 2019, Wright and the other members of the Sugarhill Gang continue to perform in '80s nostalgia shows.

== Personal life ==
Wright is a born-again Christian who enjoys painting, reading the Bible, sketching and writing poetry. He has suffered from asthma at times.

On July 11, 2013, Wright's daughter Carmen Delgina auditioned for the thirteenth season of the American televised singing competition American Idol with "Tainted Love" by Soft Cell and was unanimously sent through to the Hollywood round, as shown in the episode that aired on January 29, 2014. However, during the "group round" stage of Hollywood Week, she was eliminated at the end of her group's performance.

He is known for his large stature, standing 6 ft 5 in (1.96 m).
