= Sugar Hill Records (hip-hop label) =

American record label

- Parent company: Warner Music Group (Americas and Japan); BMG Rights Management (rest of world)
- Founded: 1979; 47 years ago
- Founder: Sylvia Robinson; Joe Robinson; Milton Malden
- Defunct: 1986
- Distributors: Rhino Entertainment (in Americas and Japan); Universal Music Group (in the rest of world in physical); BMG Rights Management (in the rest of world in digital)
- Genre: Hip-hop; Old school hip hop; boogie; rap
- Country of origin: United States
- Location: Englewood, New Jersey

Sugar Hill Records was an American record label specializing in hip hop music. Founded by Sylvia Robinson and her husband Joe Robinson along with Milton Malden in 1979, it was funded by Tony Riviera and Morris Levy. The name is derived from Sugar Hill, Manhattan, the birthplace of Sylvia Robinson.

Sugar Hill Records played an important role in the development hip hop music between the 1970s and 1980s. In addition to producing million-seller hip hop 12-inch vinyl records, the label was also credited for debuting the careers of popular hip hop music acts The Sugarhill Gang, The Sequence, Funky 4 + 1, and Grandmaster Flash and the Furious Five. During the early 1980s, Sugar Hill became one of the top independent labels in America.

== History ==
=== 1979–1982: Founding and early history ===
Sugar Hill Records was co-founded by Sylvia Robinson and Joe Robinson in Englewood, New Jersey in 1979. The label was formed after Joe Robinson folded his previous record label All Platinum. Sugar Hill Records was named after Sugar Hill, Manhattan, a National Historic District in the Harlem. Sylvia Robinson, who worked as a singer, songwriter, and music producer, began pursuing rap records at Sugar Hill after seeing Lovebug Starski perform at the Harlem World in 1979. Sugar Hill Records turned their attention to the fast-emerging rap/hip hop music scene. Their son, Joey Robinson, Jr., who worked as an executive at the label, helped recruit and assemble The Sugarhill Gang along with Sylvia. Bass player Doug Wimbish, who worked with Sylvia Robinson at her previous label All Platinum, joined Sugar Hill and form the house band with drummer Keith Le Blanc and guitarist Skip McDonald.

In September 1979, Sugar Hill Records distributed its first record "Rapper's Delight", by The Sugarhill Gang, on 12-inch vinyl records. "Rapper's Delight" was sampled from disco song "Good Times" (1979) by American disco group Chic. Despite Sugar Hill Records' innovative approach to single-only releases, they found it difficult to market 12-inch singles over 7-inch singles due to pricing. The label also found it difficult to gain airplay despite sending the record to various radio stations. The record eventually gained airplay and became widely successful after WESL St. Louis DJ and programmer Jim Gates was convinced by Sylvia to play the record. After the initial first radio play, the radio station's phone line reportedly jammed due to listeners requesting the song. "Rapper's Delight" went on to reportedly sell 14 million copies.

Following the success of the song, the label sent the Sugarhill Gang to several concert dates. Attending one of these concerts were Angie B., Blondy, and Cheryl the Pearl of the group The Sequence. The group made their way backstage and met with Sylvia Robinson, where they performed and demoed their own rap songs. The group was signed as the second music act of Sugar Hill Records. In December 1979, they released their debut single "Funk You Up", which became the first hip hop song by a female act as well as the first original hip hop song to be released without sampling. The song reportedly sold over half of a million copies.

Afterwards Super Wolf, Grandmaster Flash and the Furious Five, Funky Four Plus One, Crash Crew, Treacherous Three, West Street Mob, and Spoonie Gee were signed to the label in the early 1980s. Cheryl the Pearl of the Sequence penned several US Top 40 Hip-Hop songs for the label's music acts including "8th Wonder" and "Apache" (performed by The Sugarhill Gang), and "Let's Dance (Make Your Body Move)" and "Sing a Simple Song" by West Street Mob. Sugar Hill's in-house producer and arranger was Clifton "Jiggs" Chase. The in-house recording engineer was Steve Jerome.

=== 1983–1986: Decline ===
Despite its success, Sugar Hill Records began experiencing financial setbacks in 1983. Joe Robinson attempted to negotiate a distribution deal with Columbia Records and CBS Records but the company declined after an internal memo referred to Joe and Sylvia Robinson as "the black mafia". In attempt to stay afloat, Sylvia Robinson and Joe Robinson licensed their Chess Records catalogue, which they attained through their All Platinum Records imprint, to several other companies; a move that was convinced by Marshall Chess. Despite the reissued Chess singles and LPs selling well, the company was still experiencing financial difficulties. Sugar Hill Records eventually entered into a distribution deal with MCA Records in November 1983, orchestrated by Sal Pisello; associate of New York-based Roulette Records president Morris Levy. In the same year, Grandmaster Flash sued Sugar Hill Records for $5 million in unpaid royalties. Due to the pending lawsuit, their single "White Lines (Don't Don't Do It)" was credited to "Grandmaster & Melle Mel". Sugar Hill Records took a financial loss when American dance-punk group Liquid Liquid filed a copyright lawsuit against the label. "White Lines", which featured a sample from "Cavern" by Liquid Liquid, was never authorized and as a result, Sugar Hill Record was reported to pay $660,000 in damages. Around this time, Bernard Edwards and Nile Rodgers of Chic also threatened to file a lawsuit for unauthorized sampling of their song "Good Times" for the Sugarhill Gang song "Rapper's Delight", however the matter was settled out of court with Edwards and Rodgers receiving songwriting credits for "Rapper's Delight". Following all legal matter, Grandmaster Flash and the Furious Five disassembled due to internal conflicts and departed from Sugar Hill Records. They reformed simply as Grandmaster Flash as they were unable to use "the Furious Five" as Sugar Hill owned the name. In September 1983, Sugar Hill Records filed a lawsuit against Motown Record Corporation, MCA Distributing Corporation, and American singer-musician Rick James. The lawsuit stated that the entities misrepresent Sugar Hill Records on Rick James' Cold Blooded album in stating on the album's song "P.I.M.P. the S.I.M.P." that featured musical act "Grandmaster Flash appeared as courtesy of Sugar Hill Records". Sugar Hill also stated that the name "Grandmaster Flash" refers one individual, Joseph Saddler, while the three performers featured on "P.I.M.P. the S.I.M.P." are Melvin Glover, Guy Todd Williams, and Eddie Morris, who are members of "the Furious Five", separate and distinct from Grandmaster Flash. The lawsuit was ultimately dismissed as the court found Sugar Hill Records "had failed to meet its burden of proof in establishing the possibility of irreparable harm."

By 1985, the label's flagship acts began leaving the label, mostly due to royalty disputes. The Sequence refused to renew their recording contract after a dispute with Sylvia Robinson. The group's dispute with the label stemmed from not being paid their royalties from the songs they wrote and recorded. They also felt like the money from their royalties were being used to support other musical acts on Sugar Hill Records. In addition to the royalty dispute, Angie B. refused to renew her contract without a ten-thousand dollar advance, which lead to an internal dispute amongst the group members. Although the group disbanded and parted ways with the label, Sequence member Gwendolyn "Blondy" Chisolm briefly continued to work at the label. The Sugarhill Gang also left the label and disbanded in 1985, citing the negative-changing demographic of hip hop music. In May 1985, MCA Records purchased Sugar Hill's Checker Records, Chess Records, Cadet Records catalogues in exchanged for MCA canceling Sugar Hill's $1.7-million debt and lent Sugar Hill another $1.3 million to assist them with other financial problems.

In November 1985, Sugar Hill Records filed for protection under Chapter 11 of the U.S. Bankruptcy Code. According to MCA auditors, $300,000 of the $1.3-million Sugar Hill loan went to pay off a priority interest in the Checker/Chess catalogue held by Morris Levy. However according to Al Bergamo, former president of MCA Distributing, Levy's security interest in Checker/Chess was actually $1 million, not $300,000. In a meeting between Bergamo and Pisello, Pisello stated that a $1 million dollars was still owed to Morris Levy in order to retain the Sugar Hill Records catalogue.

In November 1986, Sylvia and Joe Robinson filed a fraud lawsuit against MCA Records and Sal Pisello, accusing them of conspiring to strip the company of its assets and sought $240-million dollars in damages. The suit also alleged that it was supposed to be paid $1.7 million in cash for the catalogue, plus a loan of $1.3 million that was to be recouped by MCA from future earnings on the sale of Checker/Chess recordings overseas. The Robinsons claimed to have only received $481,000. MCA Records countersued, accusing Joe Robinson of contractual breaches. The legal fight settled out of court after four years in 1990, with the Robinsons retaining rights over their Sugar Hill catalogue but forfeiting their Chess Records catalogue.

=== 1995–present: Aftermath ===
In June 1995, Rhino Records purchased the North American licensing rights to Sugar Hill Records' catalog. On February 4, 1997, they released a compilation of the label's greatest hits titled The Sugar Hill Records Story, which comprised 56 songs selected by Rhino's R&B staff division.

Spoonie Gee filed a lawsuit against Sugar Hill over the copyright ownership of the song "Spoonin' Rap" as well as tortious interference with prospective economic advantage, and unfair business practices in violation of New York General Business Law on October 17, 1997. In 1999, members of music acts the Furious Five, Grandmaster Melle Mel, Crash Crew, and Funky 4 + 1 filed a lawsuit against Sugar Hill Records for royalties and songwriting credits. They were represented by legal company Artists Rights Enforcement Corp. The case eventually settled in 2002 with Sugar Hill ordered to pay royalties to the plaintiffs. After the Robinsons failed to comply with the court judgment, the lawsuit continued and eventually settled in 2020.

In 2002, the company's Sugar Hill Studios (originally called "Sweet Mountain Studios") in Englewood, New Jersey was destroyed by a fire. "Rapper's Delight", "The Message", and many other Sugar Hill hits were recorded there. Master tapes from the All Platinum years, as well as Sugar Hill recordings, were reportedly destroyed in the fire.

== Legacy ==
According to Los Angeles Times, Sugar Hill Records had a reported number of twenty-six certified gold records by 1986. Since the dissolvement of Sugar Hill Records, several music acts from its former roster have voiced their disappointment on Sugar Hill Records and their musical impact being forgotten or erased from the history of hip hop music. Sylvia Robinson's niece Donna Ward stated, "Sugar Hill Records is the reason why you still have hip-hop today. It was the opening of record labels, and everyone getting into studios and making these songs." Members of The Sequence have voiced their frustration after feeling snubbed by the VH1 Hip Hop Honors: All Hail the Queens as well as VH1 referring Salt-N-Pepa as "the first true female hip-hop group", despite The Sequence debuting in 1979. Although unrelated, Funky 4 + 1 member Raheim stated, "The majority of us didn't understand the transition that we had to make from being MCs rapping in the park for free and in the clubs to actually being songwriters and recording artists. That's the reason most of the first generation of pioneers of rap didn't really have hit records and don't have a body of work as far as a musical catalog to reference."

In 2007, Grandmaster Flash & the Furious Five became the first rap group to be inducted into the Rock and Roll Hall of Fame. In 2022, Sylvia Robinson was inducted into the Rock and Roll Hall of Fame.

== Sugar Hill artists ==
- Brother to Brother
- Busy Bee
- Crash Crew
- Ferrari
- Funky 4 + 1
- Grandmaster Flash and the Furious Five
- Jack McDuff
- Multiphonic Tribe
- New Guys On The Block
- Positive Force
- Spoonie Gee
- Candi Staton
- The Sequence
- The Sugarhill Gang
- Trouble Funk
- West Street Mob
- The Treacherous Three

== Label overviews ==
- Old School Rap – The Sugar Hill Story (To the Beat Y'all) (3-CD, 1993, Sequel Records)
- The Best of Sugar Hill Records (1-CD, 1994, Hot Classics)
- The Message: The Story of Sugar Hill Records (4-CD, 1994, Castle Music) [UK Only]
- The Sugar Hill Records Story (5-CD+12", 1997, Rhino Records) [re-released in 1999 without the 12-inch]
- The Best of Sugar Hill Records (1-CD, 1998, Rhino Records) [different compilation than above]

== See also ==
- All Platinum
- List of record labels
- Sugar Hill Records (hip hop label) discography
- Turbo Records
