= Sylvia Robinson =

American singer and record producer (1935–2011)

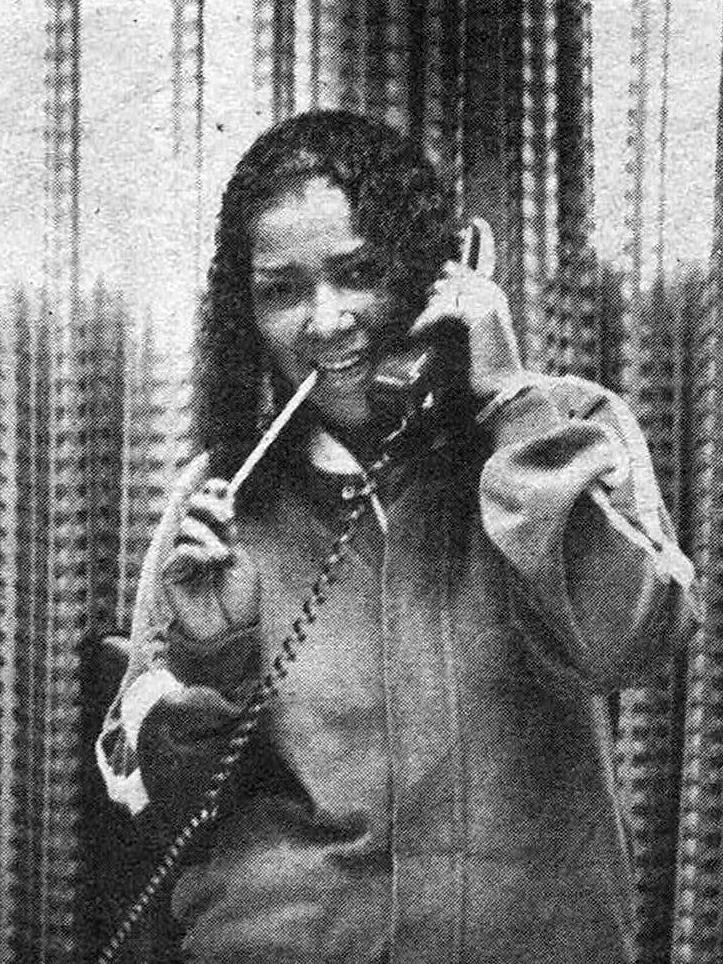
- Robinson in 1982

Background information
- Also known as: Little Sylvia; Sylvia; Sylvia Vanderpool; Sylvia Robbins; Mother of Hip Hop
- Born: Sylvia Vanterpool; May 29, 1935; Manhattan, New York City, U.S.
- Origin: Englewood, New Jersey, U.S.
- Died: September 29, 2011 (aged 76) Secaucus, New Jersey, U.S.
- Genres: Blues; R&B; rock; soul; funk; disco; hip-hop
- Occupations: Singer; record producer
- Instruments: Vocals; guitar; synthesizer
- Years active: 1950–2011
- Labels: Savoy; Columbia; Jubilee; Cat; Groove; Rainbow; RCA; Vik; Willow; King; All Platinum; Stang; Vibration; Sugar Hill
- Spouse: Joseph Robinson Sr. (m. 1959, divorced)

Sylvia Robinson (née Vanterpool; May 29, 1935 – September 29, 2011), known mononymously as Sylvia, was an American singer and record producer. Robinson achieved success as a performer on two R&B chart toppers: as half of Mickey & Sylvia with the 1957 single "Love Is Strange", and her solo record "Pillow Talk" in 1973. She later became known for her work as founder and CEO of the pioneering hip-hop label Sugar Hill Records.

Robinson is credited as the driving force behind two landmark singles in the hip hop genre: "Rapper's Delight" (1979) by the Sugarhill Gang, and "The Message" (1982) by Grandmaster Flash and the Furious Five, both of which she produced. At the 11th Annual Rhythm and Blues Awards Gala in 2000, she received a Pioneer Award for her career in singing and for founding Sugarhill Records. Several publications have dubbed her the "Mother of Hip Hop". In 2022, she was posthumously inducted into the Rock and Roll Hall of Fame in the Ahmet Ertegun Award category for being a major influence on the creative development of hip-hop's early successes, and she is the first woman to receive the award unaccompanied by another person.

== Life and career ==
=== Early life ===
Robinson was born as Sylvia Vanterpool on May 29, 1935, in Harlem, New York, United States, to Herbert, who worked for General Motors, and Ida Vanterpool. Robinson attended Washington Irving High School until dropping out at the age of 14, and began recording music in 1950 for Columbia Records under the stage name "Little Sylvia", including with the trumpeter / vocalist / bandleader Hot Lips Page.

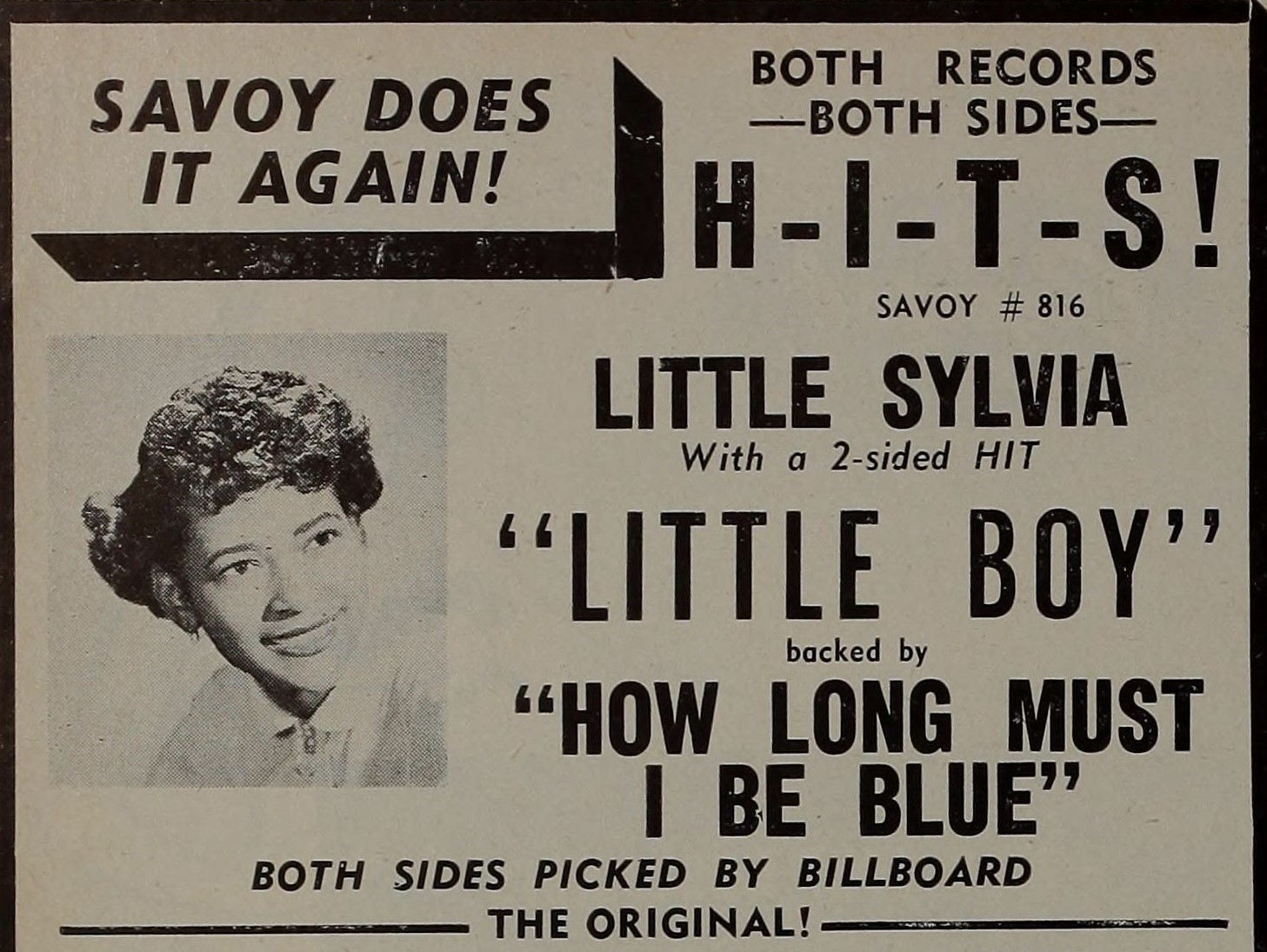
Advertisement for Little Sylvia's debut single, September 8, 1951

=== Early career ===
In 1954, she began teaming up with Kentucky guitarist Mickey Baker, who taught her how to play guitar. In 1956, the duo now known as Mickey & Sylvia recorded the Bo Diddley and Jody Williams-penned rock single, "Love Is Strange", which topped the R&B chart and reached number eleven on the Billboard pop chart in early 1957. After several more releases including the modestly successful "There Oughta Be a Law", Mickey & Sylvia split up in 1958 and she later married Joseph Robinson. Sylvia restarted her solo career shortly after her initial split from Baker, first under the name Sylvia Robbins. In 1960, Robinson produced the record "You Talk Too Much" by Joe Jones, but she did not receive credit.

In 1961, Mickey & Sylvia recorded more songs together for various labels including their own. Their label was called Willow Records and was distributed by King Records of Cincinnati. That year, Baker provided vocals and Robinson played guitar on Ike & Tina Turner's hit single "It's Gonna Work Out Fine" which earned Ike & Tina their first Grammy nomination. "I paid for the session, taught Tina the song; that's me playing guitar," Robinson said in a 1981 interview with Black Radio Exclusive.

In 1964, frustrated with the music business, Baker moved to Paris.

In 1966, the Robinsons moved to New Jersey where they formed a soul music label, All Platinum Records, the following year, with artist Lezli Valentine, formerly of the Jaynetts, bringing the label its first hit with "I Won't Do Anything". In 1968, the duo signed a Washington, D.C. act named The Moments, who immediately found success with "Not on the Outside". Within a couple of years and with a new lineup, the group scored their biggest hit with "Love on a Two-Way Street" (1970), which Sylvia co-wrote and produced with Bert Keyes and (uncredited) lyrics by Lezli Valentine. Other hits on the label and its subsidiaries, including Stang and Vibration, included Shirley & Company's "Shame, Shame, Shame" (1975), The Moments' "Sexy Mama" and "Look at Me (I'm in Love)", Retta Young's "(Sending Out An) S.O.S." (1975), and the Whatnauts/Moments collaboration, "Girls". Robinson co-wrote and produced many of the tracks, although later she was supported by two members of The Moments, Al Goodman and Harry Ray, as well as locally based producers, George Kerr and Nate Edmonds.

=== Solo career ===
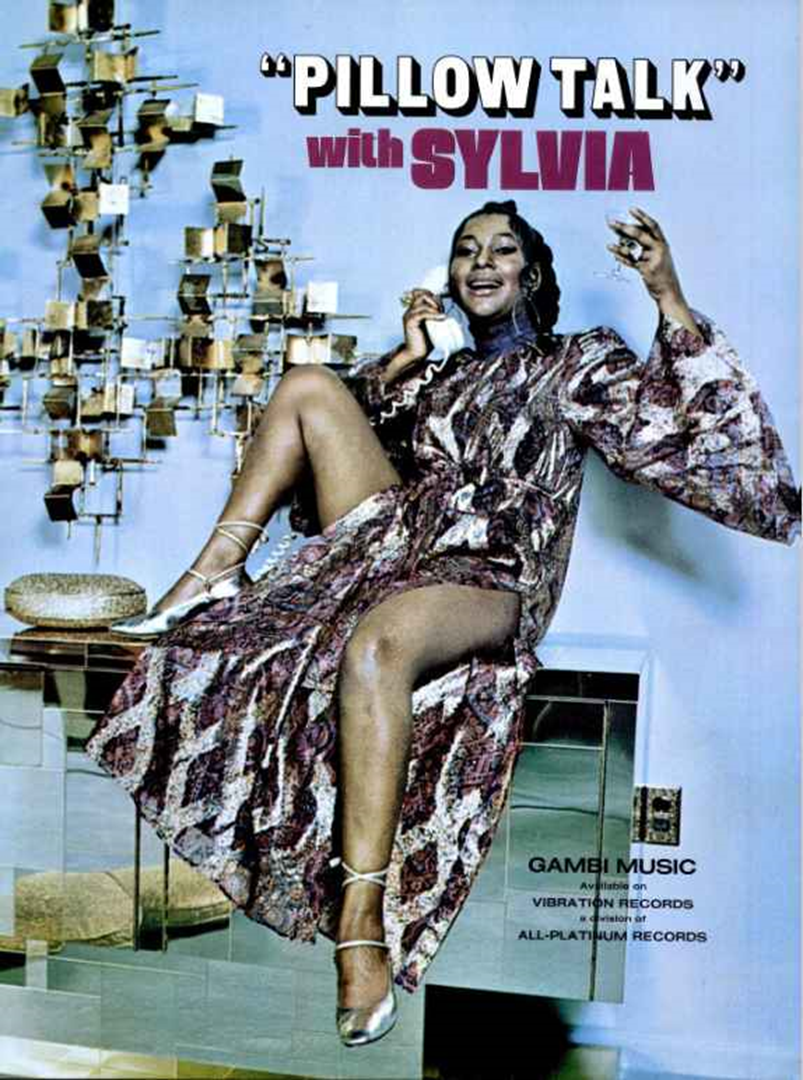
Billboard advertisement, March 24, 1973

In 1972, Robinson sent a demo of a song she had written called "Pillow Talk" to Al Green. When Green passed on it due to his religious beliefs, Robinson decided to record it herself, returning to her own musical career. Billed simply as Sylvia, the record became a major hit, reaching number-one on the R&B chart and crossing over to reach the US Billboard Hot 100 (#3), while also reaching #14 on the UK Singles Chart in the summer of 1973. She was awarded a gold disc by the R.I.A.A. in May 1973, and earned a nomination for the Grammy Award for Best Female R&B Vocal Performance at the 1974 Grammy Awards. "Pillow Talk"'s subtly orgasmic gasps and moans predated those of the 1975 Donna Summer song "Love to Love You Baby". (Both were preceded by Serge Gainsbourg's 1967 "Je t'aime... moi non plus," first recorded with Brigitte Bardot, then the following year with Jane Birkin.) Reviewing Robinson's 1973 debut LP (also titled Pillow Talk), Robert Christgau wrote in Christgau's Record Guide: Rock Albums of the Seventies (1981) that it is "Let's Get It On without production values. Call it underdeveloped if you want; I'll mention that it's unaffected. Including the best peace lyric heard lately, entitled 'Had Any Lately?'"

Robinson recorded four solo albums on the Vibration subsidiary and had other R&B hits including "Sweet Stuff" and "Pussy Cat". "Pillow Talk" was a soulful medium dance number.

=== Sugar Hill Records ===
In the 1970s, the Robinsons co-founded Sugar Hill Records. The company was named after the culturally rich Sugar Hill area of Harlem, an affluent African-American neighborhood in Manhattan, New York City, known as a hub for artists and performers in the early and mid-1900s. The song "Rapper's Delight" (1979), performed by The Sugarhill Gang, brought rap into the public music arena by attaining one of the first commercially successful hip hop songs and revolutionized the music industry by introducing rap, scratch, and breakdance. Later acts signed to Sugar Hill Records included all-female rap/funk group The Sequence, featuring a teenage Angie Stone (recording as "Angie B"), who had a million-selling hit in early 1980 with "Funk U Up".

In 1982, Sylvia Robinson with Grandmaster Melle Mel produced the record "The Message", which was performed by Grandmaster Flash and The Furious Five. The record discussed life in the ghetto and became one of the most influential tracks of the hip-hop genre. On December 5, 2012, Rolling Stone selected "The Message" as one of the "50 Greatest Hip-Hop Songs of All Time". In order for Rolling Stone to compose this list, the publication asked 33 different artists and experts from every genre of music including Busta Rhymes, Boots Riley from the Coup, Mike D from the Beastie Boys and Talib Kweli. Once the votes were in, "The Message" was placed in the number 1 spot on the list. Grandmaster Flash stated, "And when that project was on the slate to be done--The Message, I'm talking about--she would ask us for a period of time about doing a record having to do with the real life things that happen in the 'hood. And we kind of ducked it for a minute." Without Sylvia Robinson's insistence and pressure there would be no "The Message". This was the first record of its kind, where the DJ who was the cornerstone of hip hop at the time (1980s) was not involved in creating a track that they performed.

Sugar Hill Records folded in 1985 due to changes in the music industry, the competition of other hip-hop labels such as Profile and Def Jam and also financial pressures. Robinson, who had by now divorced Joe Robinson, continued her efforts as a music executive, forming Bon Ami Records in 1987. The label was noted for signing the act The New Style, who later left and found success as Naughty by Nature.

== Personal life ==
Robinson was married to businessman Joseph Robinson Sr. from May 1959 until their amicable divorce in the late 1980s. Together they had three children, sons Joseph "Joey" Robinson Jr. (1962–2015), Leland Robinson (b. 1965 or 1966) and Rhondo "Scutchie" Robinson (1970–2014). Robinson owned a bar in Harlem, New York, named "Joey's Place" after her husband in the 1960s. Robinson also owned another New York bar and nightclub named the Blue Morocco during the mid-1960s.

== Death ==
Robinson died on September 29, 2011, at the age of 76, at Meadowlands Hospital in Secaucus, New Jersey, due to congestive heart failure.

== In popular culture ==
- In 2003, American electronic musician Moby sampled her song "Sunday" for his song "Sunday (The Day Before My Birthday)".
- In the Drunk History episode "American Music" (2014), Sylvia Robinson was portrayed by Retta.
- Sylvia Robinson is one of the inspirations for the character Cookie Lyon (portrayed by Taraji P. Henson) on the popular Fox television show Empire.
- Robinson is featured on the documentary series Profiles of African-American Success.

=== Biopic ===
In 2014, producer Paula Wagner acquired the film rights to Robinson's life story from her son, Joey Robinson, an executive at Sugar Hill Records. Joey (who died in July 2015) was scheduled to executive produce and serve as a consultant on the project, along with rapper Grandmaster Melle Mel, while music executive Robert Kraft was to co-produce the film along with Stephanie Allain. In October 2015, Warner Bros. announced that it would be the studio producing the film, and that Malcolm Spellman and Carlito Rodriguez, two of the writers on Empire, were writing the script. In October 2018, it was announced that Wagner and Warner Bros. were still moving forward with the film, Spellman and Rodriguez had been joined by Tracy Oliver in completing the script, Justin Simien had been attached as the director, and that Oliver would join Robinson's son Leland as executive producers.

== Discography ==
=== Studio albums ===
List of studio albums, with selected chart positions
Title	Details	Peak chart positions	
Title	Details	US	US R&B
Pillow Talk	Released: May 1973; Label: Vibration; Formats: LP, CD, cassette, 8-track	70	16
Sweet Stuff	Released: 1975; Label: Vibration; Formats: LP, CD	—	—
Sylvia	Released: 1976; Label: Vibration; Format: LP	—	—
Lay It on Me	Released: 1977; Label: Vibration; Format: LP	—	—
"—" denotes a recording that did not chart or was not released in that territory.

=== Compilation albums ===
List of compilation albums, with selected details
Title	Details
Pillow Talk	Released: 1991; Label: K West; Format: CD
The Queen of Sexy Soul	Released: 1991; Label: P-Vine; Format: CD
Queen & King of Sweet N.J. (with George Kerr)	Released: 1991; Label: P-Vine; Format: LP
The Greatest Hits	Released: 1994; Label: Sugar Hill; Formats: CD, cassette
Pillow Talk: The Sensual Sounds of Sylvia	Released: August 20, 1996; Label: Rhino; Formats: CD, cassette
Pillow Talk: The Best of Sylvia	Released: 22 April 1997; Label: Deepbeats; Format: CD
The Best of Sylvia	Released: September 29, 2014; Label: Sanctuary; Formats: Digital download, streaming

=== Singles ===
List of singles, with selected chart positions
Title	Year	Peak chart positions							Album
Title	Year	US	US R&B	AUS	CAN	IRE	NZ	UK	Album
"Little Boy" (Note: Credited as Little Sylvia.)	1951	—	—	—	—	—	—	—	Non-album singles
"I Went to Your Wedding"	1952	—	—	—	—	—	—	—	Non-album singles
"I Found Somebody to Love"	1952	—	—	—	—	—	—	—	Non-album singles
"A Million Tears"	1952	—	—	—	—	—	—	—	Non-album singles
"The Ring"	1953	—	—	—	—	—	—	—	Non-album singles
"Fine Love" (with Mickey Baker and His Band) (Note: Credited as "Little" Sylvia Vanderpool.)	1954	—	—	—	—	—	—	—	Non-album singles
"Frankie and Johnny" (Note: Credited as Sylvia Robbins.)	1960	—	—	—	—	—	—	—	Non-album singles
"Don't Let Your Eyes Get Bigger Than Your Heart"	1964	—	—	—	—	—	—	—	Non-album singles
"Our Love"	1964	—	—	—	—	—	—	—	Non-album singles
"Oo-Wee Baby" (Note: Credited as Sylvia Robinson.)	1967	—	—	—	—	—	—	—	Non-album singles
"I Can't Help It"	1967	—	—	—	—	—	—	—	Non-album singles
"Have You Had Any Lately?"	1970	— (Note: "Have You Had Any Lately?" did not enter the Billboard Hot 100, but peaked at number 102 on the Bubbling Under Hot 100 chart.)	—	—	—	—	—	—	Non-album singles
"Lieutenant (Had Any Lately?)" (Note: Credited as Mother of Three.)	1971	—	—	—	—	—	—	—	Non-album singles
"Pillow Talk"	1973	3	1	59	3	18	15	14	Pillow Talk
"Didn't I"	1973	70	21	—	—	—	—	—	Pillow Talk
"Soul Je T'aime" (with Ralfi Pagan)	1973	99	39	—	—	—	—	—	Sweet Stuff
"Alfredo"	1973	—	62	—	—	—	—	—	Sweet Stuff
"Private Performance"	1973	—	—	—	—	—	—	—	Sweet Stuff
"Sweet Stuff"	1974	— (Note: "Sweet Stuff" did not enter the Billboard Hot 100, but peaked at number 105 on the Bubbling Under Hot 100 chart.)	16	—	—	—	—	—	Sweet Stuff
"Sho Nuff Boogie (Part 1)" (with the Moments)	1974	80	45	—	—	—	—	—	Sweet Stuff
"Easy Evil"	1974	—	68	—	—	—	—	—	Non-album singles
"Gimme a Little Action"	1974	—	—	—	—	—	—	—	Non-album singles
"Pussy Cat"	1975	—	—	—	—	—	—	—	Sweet Stuff
"L.A. Sunshine"	1976	—	54	—	—	—	—	—	Sylvia
"We Can't Hide It Anymore" (with Chuck Jackson)	1977	—	—	—	—	—	—	—	Non-album single
"The Lollipop Man (Kojak-Theme '77)"	1977	—	—	—	—	—	—	—	Lay It on Me
"Lay It on Me"	1977	—	65	—	—	—	—	—	Lay It on Me
"Automatic Lover"	1978	—	43	—	—	—	—	—	Non-album singles
"It's Good to Be the Queen"	1982	—	53	—	—	—	—	—	Non-album singles
"—" denotes a recording that did not chart or was not released in that territory.
