= Wild Style Original Soundtrack =

1982 soundtrack album by Various Artists

Soundtrack album by Various Artists
- Released: 1983
- Recorded: 1982–1983
- Genre: Old-school hip hop; turntablism
- Length: 77:47
- Label: Animal Records
- Producer: Charlie Ahearn; Chris Stein; Fab Five Freddy

Professional ratings
Review scores
Source	Rating
AllMusic	4.5/5 stars

Wild Style Original Soundtrack is the official soundtrack to the 1983 hip hop film Wild Style. It was originally released in 1983 via Animal Records, and re-released twice: in 1997 via Rhino Entertainment, and in 2007 as 25th anniversary edition via Mr Bongo Records. The album was produced by Charlie Ahearn and Chris Stein with Fab 5 Freddy, who served as musical director of the project. It featured appearances from Busy Bee, Cold Crush Brothers, DJ Charlie Chase, Grandmaster Caz, Grand Mixer DXT, Grand Wizzard Theodore & the Fantastic Five, Double Trouble (Rodney Cee & Kevie Kev Rockwell of Funky 4 + 1), Prince Whipper Whip, Rammellzee, AJ Scratch, D.J. Stieve Steve and Shockdell.

The album has been described by Leo Stanley from Allmusic as "one of the key records of early-'80s hip-hop". Thomas Golianopoulos and Mosi Reeves from Rolling Stone stated: "The soundtrack, which features beats produced by Chris Stein of Blondie and Fab 5 Freddy and live performances by Double Trouble and other old-school legends, is arguably the first great hip-hop album".

== Track listing ==
Original 1983 vinyl LP: Side 1
No.	Title	Artist	Length
1.	"Wild Style Theme Rap 1"	Grandmaster Caz and Chris Stein	6:18
2.	"M.C. Battle"	Rodney Cee and Busy Bee	3:52
3.	"Basketball Throwdown"	Cold Crush Brothers and Fantastic Freaks	1:16
4.	"Fantastic Freaks At The Dixie"	Fantastic Freaks	6:26
5.	"Military Cut (Scratch Mix)"	DJ Grand Wizard Theodore	3:35
6.	"Cold Crush Brothers At The Dixie"	Cold Crush Brothers	4:48

Original 1983 vinyl LP: Side 2
No.	Title	Artist	Length
1.	"Stoop Rap"	Double Trouble (a.k.a. Rodney Cee & KK Rockwell)	1:20
2.	"Double Trouble At The Amphitheatre"	Double Trouble	7:57
3.	"Wild Style Subway Rap 2"	Grandmaster Caz & Chris Stein	3:37
4.	"Gangbusters (Scratch Mix)"	Grand Wizard Theodore	1:20
5.	"Rammellzee & Shock Dell At The Amphitheatre"	Rammellzee & Shock Dell	3:46

25th Anniversary Edition: CD 1
No.	Title	Artist	Length
1.	"Military Cut (Scratch Mix)"	DJ Grand Wizard Theodore	2:18
2.	"M.C. Battle"	Rodney Cee & Busy Bee	3:35
3.	"Basketball Throwdown"	Cold Crush Brothers vs. Fantastic Freaks	1:17
4.	"Fantastic Freaks At The Dixie"	Fantastic Freaks	6:25
5.	"Subway Theme (Scratch Mix) (previously unreleased)"	Grand Wizard Theodore & Chris Stein	2:52
6.	"The Cold Crush Brothers At The Amphitheatre"	Cold Crush Brothers	5:42
7.	"Busy Bee's Limo Rap"	Busy Bee	1:02
8.	"Cuckoo Clocking (previously unreleased)"	Fab 5 Freddy	1:11
9.	"Stoop Rap"	Double Trouble (a.k.a. Rodney Cee & KK Rockwell)	1:19
10.	"Double Trouble At The Amphitheatre"	Double Trouble (a.k.a. Rodney Cee & KK Rockwell)	7:58
11.	"South Bronx Subway Rap (Original Version)"	Grandmaster Caz & Chris Stein	2:22
12.	"The Chief Rockers Busy Bee, D.J. AJ At The Amphitheatre (previously unreleased)"	Busy Bee	0:44
13.	"Busy Bee At The Amphitheatre"	Busy Bee	2:15
14.	"Fantastic Freaks At The Amphitheatre"	Fantastic Freaks	1:54
15.	"Gangbusters (Scratch Mix)"	Grand Wizard Theodore	1:20
16.	"Rammellzee & Shockdell At The Amphitheatre"	Rammellzee & Shock Dell	3:49
17.	"Down By Law (previously unreleased)"	Fab 5 Freddy & Chris Stein	1:08

Disc 2:

1. Wildstyle Lesson - Kev Luckhurst a.k.a. Phat Kev
2. Limousine Rap (Crime Don't Pay Mix) - Wild Style Allstars
3. Basketball Throwdown (Dixie: Razorcut Mix) - Cold Crush Brothers vs. Fantastic Freaks
4. Stoop Rap (LP Version South Bronx Mix) - Double Trouble
5. Street Rap (Subway Mix) - Busy Bee
6. Stoop Rap (Film Version) - Double Trouble
7. B Boy Beat (Instrumental) - Wild Style Allstars
8. Yawning Beat (Instrumental) - Wild Style Allstars
9. Crime Cut (Instrumental) - Wild Style Allstars
10. Gangbusters (Instrumental) - DJ Grand Wizard Theodore
11. Cuckoo Clocking (Instrumental) - Fab 5 Freddy
12. Meetings (Instrumental) - Wild Style Allstars
13. Military Cut (Instrumental) - DJ Grand Wizard Theodore
14. Razor Cut (Instrumental) - Wild Style Allstars
15. Subway Theme (Instrumental) - DJ Grand Wizard Theodore, Chris Stein
16. Busy Bees (Instrumental) - Busy Bee
17. Down By Law (Instrumental) - Fab 5 Freddy
18. Baby Beat (Instrumental) - Wild Style Allstars
19. Jungle Beat (Instrumental) - Wild Style Allstars
20. Wild Style Scratch Tool - Kev Luckhurst a.k.a. Phat Kev

NOTE: "Pretty Baby" and "Rapture" by Blondie and "Good Times" by Chic also feature in the film, but not on any edition of the soundtrack albums.

== In popular culture ==
Grand Wizard Theodore's "Subway Theme" song (from the Wild Style film) was featured in the 2015 Netflix war drama film Beasts of No Nation, starring Idris Elba.
