= Bruse Wane =

Jamaican-American rapper and songwriter

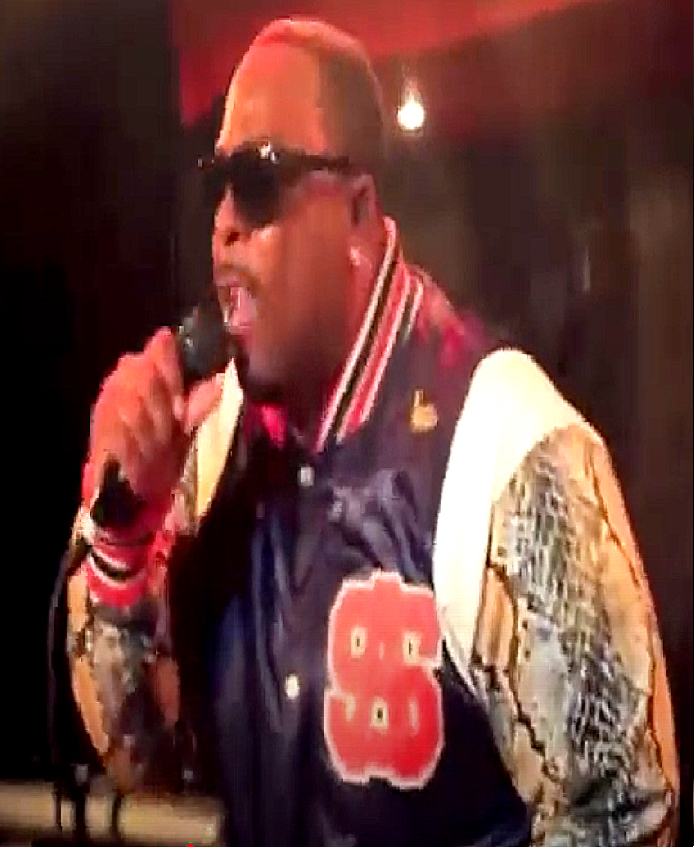
- Bruse Wane Performing in New York City

Background information
- Born: Warren Rose; Jamaica, West Indies
- Origin: The Bronx, New York, United States
- Genre: Hip-hop
- Occupations: Rapper, songwriter, music executive
- Years active: 2003–present
- Labels: RED Music, Wane Enterprises, khemistry Music
- Website: www.brusewane.com

Warren Rose, known professionally as Bruse Wane, is a Jamaican-American rapper, songwriter and music executive. In the genres of hip-hop, reggae and electro funk, he has worked with Papoose, Sean Price, Keith Murray, Kool Keith, Kurtis Mantronik and Dawn Penn.

== Early life ==
Warren Rose was born in Jamaica and raised in the Bronxdale Projects in the Bronx. The Bronxdale houses is considered a vital neighborhood in the origins of hip-hop culture, based on its connection to Disco King Mario and the Black Spades. In an interview with British rapper Blade, Wane states it is there he was influenced by hip-hop culture and music.

== Career ==
=== 2015–2016 ===
In 2015, Wane established his name in rap music when he released the album The Earl Manigault of Rap. The lead single "Venom" featured his mentor Sean Price's last recorded verse before his death. The song also featured a guest appearance by Big Pun's son Chris Rivers. Shirley Ju of HipHopDX described the song as being praised by "critics and fans alike".

In 2016, Wane and Rivers performed their portions of the song live at a show in Brooklyn. In 2016, Wane also appeared as a featured guest on DJ Eclipse's Rap Is Outta Control radio show, on SiriusXM. The segment focused on Wane's music and adventures as an active artist.

=== 2019–present ===
In 2019, Wane released The Dark Knight Album 2 The Fight For Gotham. The lead single "Killa Soundboy" featured Brooklyn rapper Papoose. in 2019 DJ Kay Slay had Wane on as a featured guest on his Street Sweeper radio show, on SiriusXM. During the segment they spoke about Wane's latest album. In 2022, Wane publicly expressed a desire to return to his Caribbean roots through his music. He did so by releasing his reggae inspired song "Sunrise 2 Sunset". In 2023, Kurtis Mantronik made Wane a member of the group Mantronix. The song "Era Of The AI" was among one of their joint releases. In 2023 Wane also worked with reggae artist Dawn Penn on a remake to her song " You Don't Love Me (No, No, No)". Chase Parker, writing in The Source magazine, described Wane as a voice that reminds "us that progress doesn't have to come at the cost of principles".

In 2025, Wane released The Darth Wane Album, which was framed against a backdrop inspired by the mythology of the Star Wars universe and villain Darth Vader. During an interview with Illuminati 2G, Wane said the album's dark tone was inspired by the isolating dark days of the COVID-19 pandemic. The lead single "Paradigm Shift The Fentanyl Remix" featured Bronx rapper kool Keith. The Source magazine credited Wane for taking listeners on a cinematic journey on the album, and declared the album a "masterwork".

== Discography ==
=== Studio albums ===
- The Dark Knight Album The Day The Earth Stood Still (2013)
- The Earl Manigault Of Rap (2015)
- The Dark Knight Album 2 Fight For Gotham (2019)
- The Darth Wane Album (2025)

=== Mixtapes ===
- The BatMan Should Have Been On It Volume One (2017)
- The BatMan Should Have Been On It Volume Two (2024)

=== Singles ===
- "No" (2012)
- "Home Of The Spitters" featuring Keith Murray (2014)
- "Beast Inside" featuring Sean Price (2014)
- "Hercules" (2015)
- "Venom" featuring Sean Price and Chris Rivers (2015)
- "Killa Soundboy" featuring Papoose (2019)
- "Money Talks", produced by Kurtis Mantronik (2023)
- "Era Of The AI", produced by Kurtis Mantronik (2023)
- "When The Doves Fly", produced by Kurtis Mantronik (2024)
- "Beast Inside The Feral Mix" featuring Sean Price (2024)
- "Paradigm Shift The Fentanyl Remix" featuring Kool Keith (2025)

=== Guest appearances ===
- 16 Bars For Hip Hop compilation album released by the Hip Hop Museum
- "Everywhere" featuring Percee P, Big D, and various artists produced by Kapitol and Easy Mo Bee
- "The Everywhere Remix" featuring Termanology, Royal Flush, Herb McGruff, Illa Ghee, Big D & various artists
