= DJ Disco Wiz =

- Born: Luis Cedeño; August 11, 1961 (age 65); The Bronx, New York City, U.S.
- Genre: Hip hop
- Occupations: DJ; rapper
- Instrument: Turntables
- Formerly of: Mighty Force

Luis Cedeño (born August 11, 1961), more commonly known as DJ Disco Wiz is an American DJ.

He is noted as being the first Latino DJ in Hip-Hop.

== Old School ==
He was born in the Bronx, New York City, United States, to a Puerto Rican father and a mother from Cuba.

After being inspired at a Kool Herc jam by the emerging hip hop movement taking place in The Bronx, DJ Disco Wiz collaborated with his best friend, Casanova Fly (Grandmaster Caz), to form a group called the Mighty Force crew. Mighty Force is noted as being one of the first Hip-Hop DJ crews in the mid-to-late 1970s. Noted for their DJ battles in the streets of the South Bronx, the Mighty Force crew was also responsible for presenting the first Latino rapper to the world, Prince Whipper Whip, who is also of Puerto Rican descent. DJ Disco Wiz is also credited for being the first DJ to create a "mixed plate" in 1977 (Hip-Hop's first mixed dub recording) when he and Grandmaster Caz, combined sound bites, special effects and paused beats.

== New School ==
The grandson of the late Puerto Rican artist and Santero Norberto Cedeño; (La Mano Poderosa, 1950), Wiz is the creator of "The Hip-Hop Meets Spoken Wordz" series, a hip hop and poetry performance series that gives a voice to up-and-coming Latino talent in New York City. As a poet, DJ Disco Wiz has performed at the Apollo Theater and the landmark Nuyorican Poets Cafe and his poetry can be seen in the upcoming book Born in the Bronx. Wiz also appears in a few documentaries on hip-hop history including 1 LOVE, a film produced by noted hip-hop historian James "Koe" Rodriguez about the lives of Joe Conzo, Ernie Paniccioli, and Jamel Shabazz—hip-hop's first photographers.

Wiz has openly contributed to the community education about the formative years of hip-hop. In the millennium issue of The Source Magazine he candidly shared his experience in being the first Latino DJ during the culture's evolution. He was also a major contributor in the opening of the Experience Music Project in Seattle, Washington in 2000. His contribution and donation of original hip-hop flyers, solely for the preservation of hip-hop can be seen as part of the archives. He was also instrumental in the making of Jim Fricke and Charlie Ahearn's rendition of the early years of hip-hop entitled Yes, Yes Y’all; sharing numerous original flyers and first-hand accounts of the early years of hip-hop including an account of the historical New York City blackout of 1977.

He is also a board member of the Universal Federation for the Preservation of Hip Hop Culture, chaired by Afrika Bambaataa of the Universal Zulu Nation. The Federation also includes on its board; Grandmaster Caz, DJ Tony Tone, Kurtis Blow, GrandMaster Melle Mel, KRS-One, Lovebug Starski, Jorge “PopMaster Fabel” Pabon, and photographer Joe Conzo.

Wiz co-authored his memoirs with Simon & Schuster author Ivan Sanchez. The book is titled It’s Just Begun: The Epic Journey of DJ Disco Wiz, Hip-Hop’s First Latino DJ. The book was released on the Miss Rosen imprint of powerHouse Books in 2009.

== Television ==
- The Emmy Nominated Vh1 Rock Doc ny77: the Coolest year in hell Developed by Nanette Burstein and Firehouse Films for Vh1.
