= Waves (Kanye West song) =

Song by Kanye West

from the album The Life of Pablo
- Released: February 14, 2016
- Recorded: 2014–16
- Genre: Art pop
- Length: 3:01
- Label: GOOD; Def Jam
- Songwriters: Kanye West; Chris Brown; Scott Mescudi; Cydel Young; Tony Williams; Elon Rutberg; Ross Birchard; Derek Watkins; Mike Dean; Chancelor Bennett; Leland T. Wayne; Ernest Brown; Fred Bratwaithe; Robin Diggs; Kevin Ferguson; Theodore Livingston; Darryl Mason; James Whipper; Jahron Brathwaite
- Producers: Kanye West; Charlie Heat

Audio
- "Waves" on YouTube

"Waves" is a song by the American rapper Kanye West from his seventh studio album, The Life of Pablo (2016). The song includes guest vocals from singer Chris Brown and fellow rapper Kid Cudi. It was the first beat conceived by West with Charlie Heat, which was set to be scrapped until a few weeks before release and Chance the Rapper persuaded West to keep the song on the album. An art pop number with gospel elements, the song samples Fantastic Freaks's "Fantastic Freaks at the Dixie" and features choral synths. It mostly features vocals from Brown, who sings about the symbolism of waves crashing at sea. The song received generally positive reviews from music critics, who mostly praised Brown's appearance. Some highlighted the musicality, while a few critics picked it as a highlight of the album.

Despite not being released as a single, "Waves" charted in the United States, reaching number 71 on the Billboard Hot 100. The song also entered charts in Canada, Ireland, Sweden, and the United Kingdom. It was certified triple platinum and gold in the US and UK by the Recording Industry Association of America (RIAA) and British Phonographic Industry (BPI), respectively. A music video was shot for the song in the Isle of Skye during April 2016, with Hype Williams serving as director. West first performed the song at the Paradise International Music Festival in 2016, later performing it on his Saint Pablo Tour that same year. A demo version had been recorded by Chance the Rapper with a sample of Enigma's work and choral vocals, which he shared in May 2016. The rapper performed the demo at the 2017 Governors Ball Music Festival.

== Background and development ==
"Waves" was the first beat that was conceived by West with record producer Charlie Heat, in the same week they made the beat for his 2015 single "All Day" that was recorded in 2014. Charlie Heat praised West as a genius, writing that he let the rapper "speak on his process, but some people are just gifted at things". The producer put forward that West is the best musician he has met "at coming up with a good product", feeling working with him expanded his mind in production, art, and life. "Waves" originally contained a sample of "Return to Innocence" (1994) by Enigma, until Scottish producer Hudson Mohawke took the sample out and added choir synths, which ended up becoming "the majority of the song in terms of the instrumental", according to him. Mohawke confirmed that the beat was nearly scrapped just weeks before the album's release. He also hinted in a tweet that he was "partially responsible" for the album's name change from Swish to Waves, before West eventually settled on The Life of Pablo. Discussing the production of the song, Mohawke stated that "less is more" and that there are "probably only like six or seven elements in the whole song".

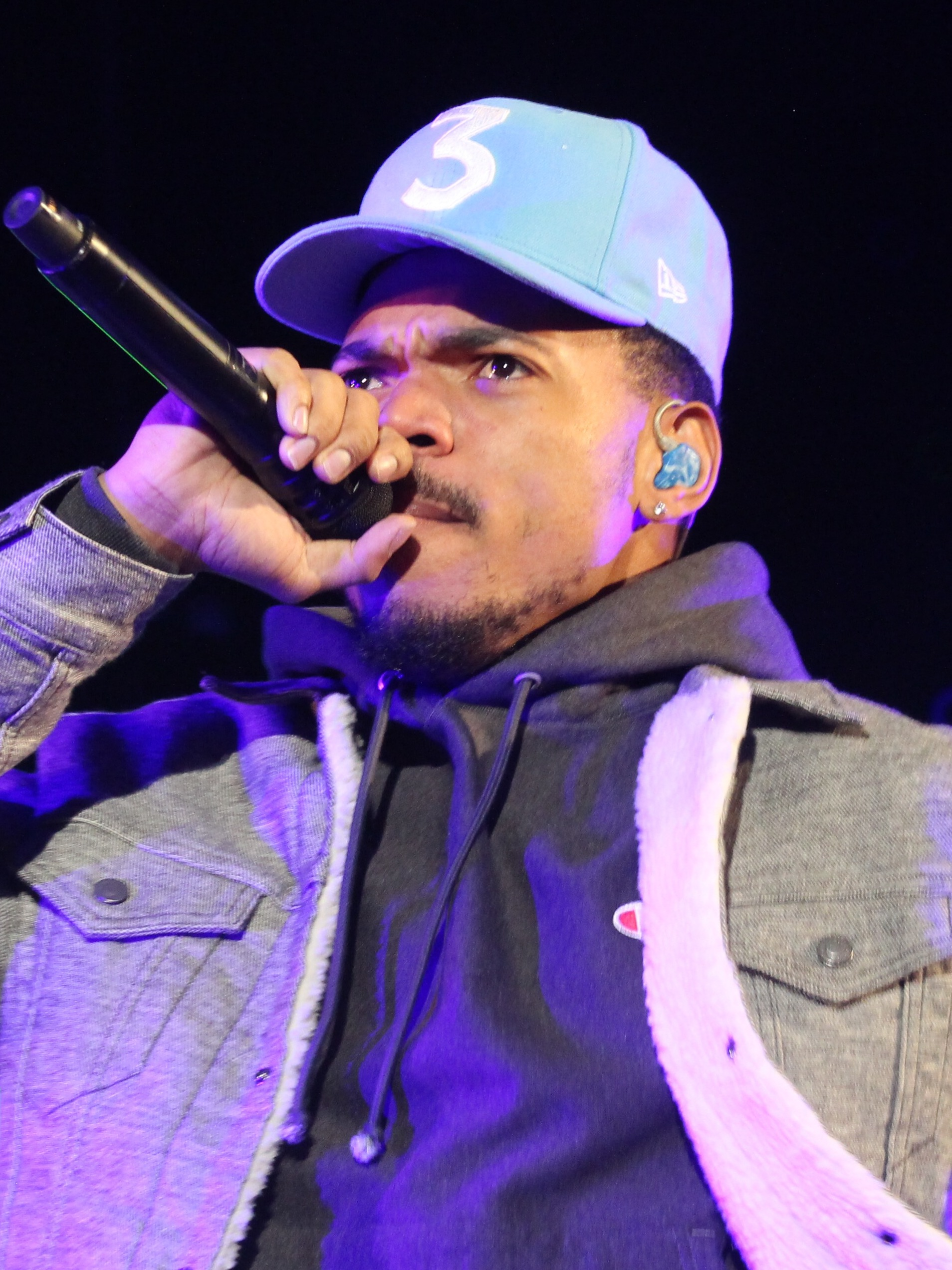
Chance the Rapper insisted the song be included on The Life of Pablo in February 2016, having previously recorded a demo version.

According to co-writer Derek Watkins, known as Fonzworth Bentley, Chris Brown came to be featured on "Waves" when West sought out a collaboration after thinking he was the answer to his question, "Who's the second most hated nigga in America?" West and Brown had previously collaborated on the singer's track "Down" from Brown's sophomore album Exclusive in 2007. Watkins recalled that he walked into studio when the beat was being played with the performers on each side, which inspired West's line "Step up in this bitch like." He also told West about his brother's belief of how waves crashing to "hit that white surf" shows that "angels are going to come out of there perpetually at the end of the Earth as we know it", which inspired the line "Waves don't die". This also helped inspire the spiritual themes presented across The Life of Pablo. According to Watkins, his songwriting contributions were for the hook. On April 22, 2016, Kid Cudi revealed to Billboard that West sent him an earlier version of "Waves" in December 2015, then he decided to clear out ab-libs for improvement when listening to an edit featuring Brown. The rapper found it important to have a "minimal version" where Brown could be heard better, while he contributed humming to the song.

A demo of "Waves" was recorded by West collaborator Chance the Rapper, who posted snippets to Snapchat on February 16, 2016. In an interview with DJ Zane Lowe on May 24, Chance the Rapper shared his full demo of "Waves", which was arranged by him and included the reinterpreted sample of "Return to Innocence". The demo also features choral vocals that he added, however West removed these on the final version. Additionally, Chance the Rapper delivers the same lyrics as West used on the song; he ultimately received a writing credit. On February 18, 2016, West's original version leaked online along with demos of other songs from The Life of Pablo, including "Fade" and "Highlights". In a 2016 interview, Trinidadian-American singer Theophilus London said that he had been forced by West to write "Waves", but received no credit for it.

== Composition and lyrics ==
Musically, "Waves" is an art pop number, with elements of gospel music. According to numerous publications, it evokes West's previous works. The song contains samples of "Fantastic Freaks at the Dixie", as written and performed by the Fantastic Freaks. It incorporates looped choral synths. On the song's hook, Brown sings "Waves don't die", referencing the symbolism of waves crashing in the sea. The singer is the most prominent performer on the song, delivering more vocals than West himself. His hook is warped in the background, with the vocals chopped-up. Vocals are contributed by Kid Cudi, who hums on the song.

West delivers melancholic vocals and raps the line "step up in this bitch like", which was originally "Walk up in this bitch like..." After the release of The Life of Pablo, West announced plans to change the album during 2016 with new mixes, tweaks, and additions; Def Jam, his label, called it "a living, evolving art project". West re-recorded his first verse for the song, preventing it from being swallowed by the production. More echos were also present and the snare was decreased.

== Release and promotion ==
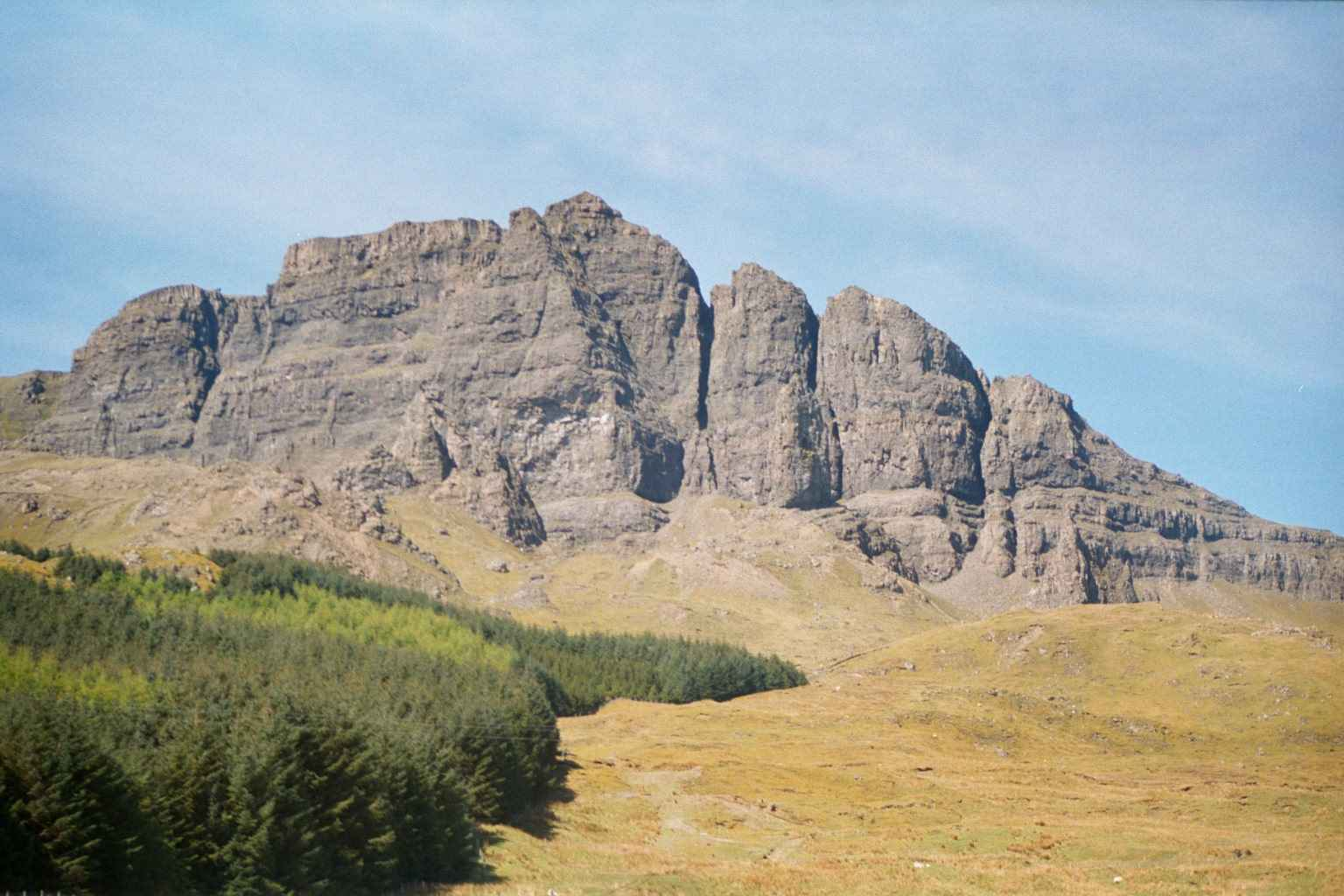
West visited The Storr (pictured) during his trip on the Isle of Skye to shoot a music video for "Waves".

On January 24, 2016, the song was first announced when West shared a track list for his then-upcoming album Waves with it as the title track. After the album missed its scheduled release date under the title of The Life of Pablo on February 12, 2016, Chance the Rapper posted a series of tweets, telling how he "fought everyone" for the song to be included, after it had been removed from previous track lists. The rapper attached a picture of the album's track list and detailed that he "spent all night" finishing the song: "The world is better because of it." West responded by tweeting that it was "Chance's fault the album not out [sic] yet... he really wanted Waves on that Bitch..." and confirmed he was still in the studio, sharing an alternative album cover too with the text "Blame Chance". Kid Cudi also revealed that him, Mike Dean, and Plain Pat were insistent on the inclusion. On February 14, 2016, West's seventh studio album The Life of Pablo was released, featuring "Waves" as the tenth track.

On April 11, 2016, West traveled to the Isle of Skye in Scotland to film a music video for "Waves", flying there from a performance in the Philippines that included the song. The shoot spanned a few days and Hype Williams served as director, with Lealt Falls and the Storr reported as locations. West was joined by around 60 crew members and several helicopters, occupying half of the 14 rooms in the Skeabost House Hotel. A hotel spokesman confirmed that photographs were banned during West's stay and his then-wife Kim Kardashian did not accompany him, asserting that the rapper was focused on working. A hotel co-owner told the Daily Record that West made was an ideal guest with his manners, taking pleasure to offer hospitality to his team anytime. VisitScotland's Scott Armstrong was satisfied with West choosing the island for the music video, hoping that the decision from someone of his level of fame "will inspire even more people to 'touch the Skye'".

== Critical reception ==
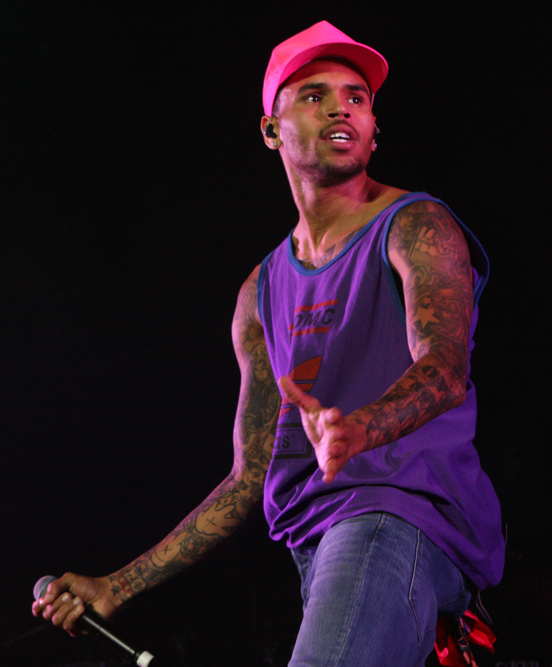
Chris Brown received praise for his performance on the track.

"Waves" was met with generally positive reviews from music critics. Writing for Punknews.org, nickEp commented that Brown's "catchy hook" on the song occupies "more retail space than Kanye himself". Jake Indiana from Highsnobiety cited the performance as among the album's best and was thankful for the song's inclusion bringing "a blinding moment of triumph and joy", noting it evokes "ascending to heaven with a choir of angels at your back". In USA Today, Patrick Ryan chose Brown's appearance as one of the album's "most memorable spots", while HipHopDX's Justin Hunte asserted that the song relies on him. The Atlantic's Spencer Kornhaber cited the feature as an instance of pretending that "momentary pleasures are permanent" and named the song as a highlight of The Life of Pablo, pointing out its "glorious, pulsating sound". David Jeffries wrote for AllMusic that the song sounds like a remix of Brown by Kraftwerk, while Calum Slingerland from Exclaim! felt him to be briefly redeemable "amidst the uplifting tremolo choir". Pitchfork's Jayson Greene felt the track's energy echoes fellow album track "Famous" and the "Rainbow Road maximalism" is reminiscent of "We Major" from Late Registration, while noting that Brown sounds "momentarily benevolent" due to the redemptive feel. The Chicago Tribune journalist Greg Kot considered that West's decision to feature the "R&B villain" Brown is his way to say anyone has "an opportunity to achieve Paul-like redemption". Although he picked the bright number as the record's "most beautiful track", Kot felt it would work better on a more focused release.

At The 405, Samantha O'Connor commented that the song's "cinematic magnitude" resembles West's 2011 single "All of the Lights". DIY's Tom Connick highlighted the track's resemblance to "the 'pink polo' Kanye days of his earlier works", while The A.V. Club reviewer Corbin Reiff selected it as one of the best tracks on The Life of Pablo. Jamieson Cox of The Verge questioned if the track could be "the most beautiful song [West has] ever made". Alexis Petridis from The Guardian found the song to be great, describing it as "simultaneously euphoric and elegiac". Sheldon Pearce of Spin wrote that "Waves" is the central part of "a discombobulated but altogether splendid group of sonic marvels" crafted by the album's producers, showcasing the type of work made by West when not on his Lexapro. At Drowned in Sound, Mark Ward offered that the song serves as a reminder of why West is due a tribute if his "ego-stroking is incessant". Jesal 'Jay Soul' Padania of RapReviews was dismissive of the song's inclusion on The Life of Pablo, branding it as "a fish out of water, not a bridge" and a disruption to the album's cohesiveness.

== Commercial performance ==
Despite never being released as a single, "Waves" managed to chart in five countries and experienced similar performance to "Ultralight Beam". Upon the release of The Life of Pablo, the track debuted at number 71 on the US Billboard Hot 100. It placed four places lower than the aforementioned song and recorded 7.2 million streams in the United States. The track spent two weeks on the Hot 100. In the same week as its debut, the track peaked at number 24 on the US Hot R&B/Hip-Hop Songs chart, lasting for three weeks. On May 31, 2023, over seven years after having been made available to legally stream or download, "Waves" was awarded a triple platinum certification by the Recording Industry Association of America (RIAA) for amassing 3,000,000 certified units in the US. The track entered the Canadian Hot 100 at number 86, becoming the album's highest debut of the three non-single releases that charted in Canada.

"Waves" debuted and peaked at number 77 on the UK Singles Chart, on which it spent two weeks. As of August 5, 2021, the track ranks as West's 35th most successful release of all time in the United Kingdom. On March 8, 2024, "Waves" received a gold certification from the British Phonographic Industry (BPI) for shelving 400,000 units in the UK. The song and "Ultralight Beam" are the only non-singles from the album to be certified in the UK. In Sweden, the track reached number 80 on the Singles Top 100. "Waves" was less successful on the Irish Singles Chart, debuting at number 95 one week after the album's release and standing with "Ultralight Beam" as one of the two non-singles to chart in Ireland. The former was certified gold by IFPI Danmark for sales of 45,000 units in Denmark on April 19, 2022.

== Live performances and other appearances ==
West performed the song live for the first time at the Paradise International Music Festival in the Filipino capital Manila on April 9, 2016. He performed the song from his floating stage at Madison Square Garden in New York City for the Saint Pablo Tour on September 5, 2016. On October 15, West performed it as his stage moved at Rogers Place in Edmonton, Canada on the tour. West delivered a medley that consisted of the instrumental of "Waves" and Kid Cudi's vocals from "Father Stretch My Hands, Pt. 1" at a tour stop in Inglewood, California on October 25, 2016, dedicated to the rapper while he was in rehab. On November 20, 2016, West and Kid Cudi performed the song on the flying stage at a show in Sacramento, California. The performers embraced each other and West noted Kid Cudi's return from rehab, highlighting his artistry and calling him a "brother".

Chance the Rapper performed his version of the song in San Diego at the kickoff show of his Be Encouraged Tour on April 24, 2017, segueing from it into a cover of "Pt. 1". At the 2017 Governors Ball Music Festival, Chance the Rapper performed the rendition. In August 2016, Kardashian listed the track on a playlist of her top 28 favourite songs by West. On February 23, 2016, a reversed version of "Waves" was shared by SoundCloud producer Justin Lombardi for download. An unofficial remix blending the song's released version and Chance the Rapper's demo was shared for download by a Reddit user on July 11.

== Credits and personnel ==
Credits adapted from West's official website and the BMI Repertoire. (Note: Find additional credits for the song on the BMI Repertoire by searching "Waves" under Title and Kanye West under performer.)

Recording

- Mixed at Larrabee Studios, North Hollywood, CA

Personnel

- Kanye West – songwriter, production
- Charlie Heat – songwriter, production
- Hudson Mohawke – songwriter, co-production
- Metro Boomin – songwriter, co-production
- Mike Dean – songwriter, co-production, engineer
- Chris Brown – songwriter, vocals
- Scott Mescudi – songwriter, vocals
- Cydel Young – songwriter
- Tony Williams – songwriter
- Elon Rutberg – songwriter
- Derek Watkins – songwriter
- Chancelor Bennett – songwriter
- Fred Bratwaithe – songwriter
- Robin Diggs – songwriter
- Kevin Ferguson – songwriter
- Theodore Livingston – songwriter
- Darryl Mason – songwriter
- James Whipper – songwriter
- Jahron Brathwaite – songwriter
- Anthony Kilhoffer – additional production, engineer
- Noah Goldstein – engineer
- Andrew Dawson – engineer
- Tom Kahre – engineer
- Manny Marroquin – mixer
- Chris Galland – assistant mixer
- Ike Schultz – assistant mixer
- Jeff Jackson – assistant mixer

== Charts ==
Chart performance for "Waves"
Chart (2016)	Peak position
Canada Hot 100 (Billboard)	86
Ireland (IRMA)	95
New Zealand Heatseekers (RMNZ)	9
Sweden (Sverigetopplistan)	80
UK Singles (Official Charts)	77
UK Hip Hop/R&B (Official Charts)	20
US Billboard Hot 100	71
US Hot R&B/Hip-Hop Songs (Billboard)	24

== Certifications ==
Certifications for "Waves"
Region	Certification	Certified units/sales
Denmark (IFPI Danmark)	Gold	45,000^{‡}
New Zealand (RMNZ)	Platinum	30,000^{‡}
United Kingdom (BPI)	Gold	400,000^{‡}
United States (RIAA)	3× Platinum	3,000,000^{‡}
^{‡} Sales+streaming figures based on certification alone.
