= Hip Hop Museum =

American music museum in the Bronx, New York

Coordinates: 40.82137°N 73.92979°W

The Hip Hop Museum
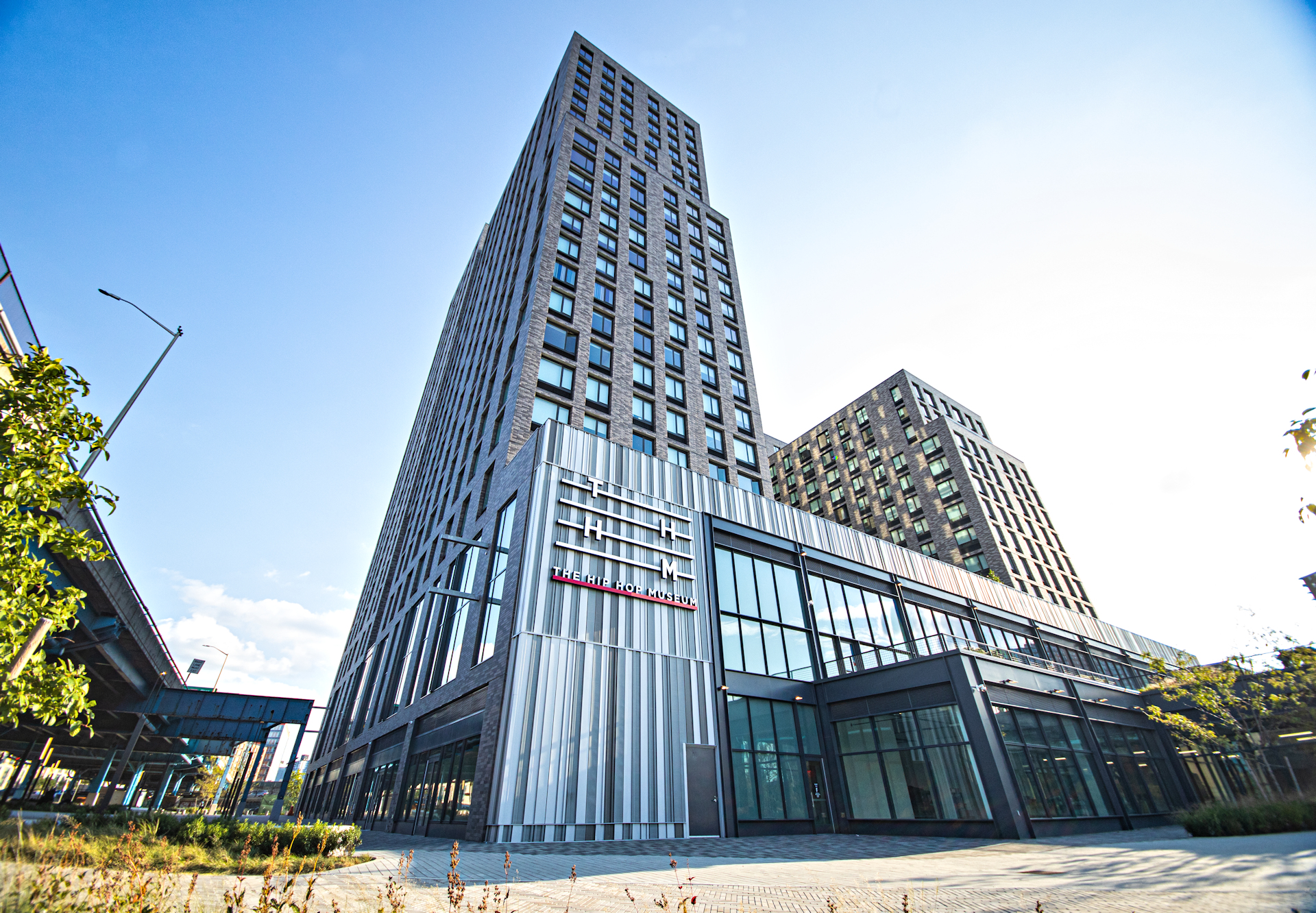
- Bronx Point and The Hip Hop Museum
- Established: 2015; 11 years ago
- Location: The Bronx, NY, U.S.
- Directors: Rocky Bucano (Founder & Chief Executive Officer); Indira A. Abiskaroon Valbuena (Creative Director and Director of Curatorial Affairs)
- Architect: Michael Ford
- Website: thhm.org

The Hip Hop Museum is a museum dedicated to the celebration and preservation of Hip hop music, dance, art and culture and "permanent place to celebrate the music that has made the Bronx famous around the world". The museum will be located on Exterior Street in the Lower Concourse neighborhood of The Bronx when construction is complete.

== History ==
The museum was founded in 2015 as the Universal Hip Hop Museum, by a group of hip hop pioneers—Rocky Bucano, Kurtis Blow, Grand Wizzard Theodore, Joe Conzo Jr. and Grandmaster Melle Mel— to document, preserve, and celebrate the culture of Hip Hop.

The museum rebranded as The Hip Hop Museum in September 2023.

== Museum ==
The 52,000-square-foot museum will be part of a South Bronx multi-use development project at 610 Exterior Street called Bronx Point. Michael Ford, of BrandNu Design Studio, is the architect of the building. Bronx Point is not far from the so-called "birthplace" of hip hop on Sedgwick Avenue, it will include a 300-seat theatre, a gallery, community space, and about 520 affordable housing units on top of it. The official groundbreaking was held on May 20, 2021, and involved a number of hip hop notables including Grandmaster Flash and LL Cool J. The museum was initially scheduled to open in 2023 in connection with the genre's fiftieth anniversary. Due to delays in construction caused by the COVID-19 pandemic, the museum is now scheduled to open in 2027.

=== Programming ===
The [R]Evolution of Hip Hop Experience opened at the Bronx Terminal Market on December 6, 2019, as the museum's first public exhibit in its temporary home until construction finishes. The 2,350 square-foot exhibit was free to the public and served as a preview to what will be on display in the permanent home of the Universal Hip Hop Museum. The exhibit featured artifacts of Hip Hop culture, music, photographs kiosks with content and experiences, as well as interactive elements including a DJ stand where visitors can test out their skills. Following a closure due to the COVID-19 pandemic, the space reopened in November 2020 with an exhibit focusing on 1980s hip hop. The [R]Evolution of Hip Hop exhibit has since closed.
