= Busy Bee Starski =

American rapper

Busy Bee
- Also known as: Chief Rocker Busy Bee; Busy Bee Starski; Busy B
- Born: David James Parker; October 26, 1962 (age 63); The Bronx, New York City, U.S.
- Origin: Baltimore, Maryland, U.S.
- Genres: Old school hip hop
- Occupation: Rapper
- Years active: 1977–present
- Labels: Strong City; Uni; MCA; Pandisc

David James Parker (born October 26, 1962), known by the stage name Busy Bee, is an American old-school hip hop musician from New York, NY. First coming on the New York City music scene in 1977, Busy Bee worked with many of hip-hop's founding fathers, including Melle Mel, Disco King Mario, Afrika Bambaataa, and Kool DJ AJ.

== Career ==
After being inspired by Kidd Creole, Melle Mel, and Keef Cowboy Busy Bee decided he wanted to be a rapper. He initially hooked up with Disco King Mario of the Black Spades from the Bronxdale Houses. According to Busy Bee Disco king Mario had the sound system and told Busy Bee he would make him a star. Known for his comedic rhymes, Busy Bee originally gained a large following through MC rap battles in Staten Island, Brooklyn, and New Jersey. He was famously roasted by Kool Moe Dee at Harlem World in Manhattan, NY, December 1981, in one of the earliest documented rap battles. In 1985, he won the New Music Seminar's MC World Supremacy Belt. In the early 1980s Afrika Bambaataa asked Busy to join his Zulu Nation where the young MC would DJ for Bambaataa's Zulu Nation parties. Busy Bee continues to rhyme today, most recently appearing on KRS-One and Marley Marl's collaborative 2007 album Hip Hop Lives.

Busy Bee was featured in the 1983 film Wild Style, billed as the first hip-hop motion picture, directed by Charlie Ahearn. More recently, he played himself in the 2002 inner-city drama Paid in Full. In 2007, he was included in the video documentary Hip Hop Legends.

Thirty years after the song's initial release, in 2018 Robert Rippberger directed the official music video for “Suicide” by Busy Bee, the single off his gold album Running Thangs. The video features a cameo by artist Ice-T.

== Personal life ==
He currently resides in Las Vegas, Nevada, with Michelle, his wife of over 20 years. He has two daughters.

== Discography ==
Albums

- 1988 – Running Thangs (Strong City/Uni/MCA Records) - #48 on the Top R&B/Hip-Hop Albums
- 1992 – Thank God for Busy Bee (Pandisc Records)

Singles

- "The Marvelous Three and the Younger Generation" (Busy Bee, DJ Small, AJ, Cowboy, Kid Creole, Melle Mel, Mr. Ness, Rahiem) - Rappin' All Over (Brass Records - 1980)
- "School Days" (Master Five - 1981)
- "Making Cash Money" (Sugar Hill - 1982)
- "Busy Bee's Groove" (Sugar Hill - 1985)
- "Suicide" (Strong City/Uni/MCA - 1987)
- "Express" (Strong City/Uni/MCA - 1988)
- "Keep It Movin'" (Blazin' - 2002)
- "Rock the House" (Blazin' - 2002)

=== Guest appearances ===
Year	Song	Artist	Album
1982	"MC Battle" "Street Rap" "Chief Rocker Busy Bee & DJ AJ At The Amphitheatre"	V/A	Wild Style OST
1985	"Vice"	V/A	Miami Vice Soundtrack
1989	"Ndodemnyama (Free South Africa)"	V/A	Hip Hop Artist Against Apartheid
1991	"First Black History Jam Live At The Bronx River Centre"	V/A	Afrika Bambaataa & The Universal Zulu Nation In Conjunction With Music Of Life Presents Hip Hop Funk Dance Classics Volume 2
1992	"First Black History Jam Live At The Bronx River Centre (Part 2)"	V/A	Hip Hop Funk Dance Classics Volume 2
1992	"Hip Hop Throwdown"	V/A	Afrika Bambaataa & The Universal Zulu Nation In Conjunction With Music Of Life Presents Hip Hop Funk Dance Classics Volume 3
1994	"Real"	V/A	Raiders of the Lost Art...
1998	"Freestyle"	Funkmaster Flex	The Mix Tape Volume III: 60 Minutes Of Funk
2000	"Words From The Chief Rocker"	De La Soul	Art Official Intelligence: Mosaic Thump
2002	"Make It Hot"	V/A	Legends Of Hip Hop
2007	"House of Hits"	KRS-One & Marley Marl	Hip Hop Lives
2008	"Busy Bee Shout Out"	KRS-One	Maximum Strength
2009	"Intro" "Dance Sucka (Interlude)" "Hip Hop Is Something We Live (Interlude)" "Kickin' Flava (Interlude)" "We'll Be Here Forever (Interlude)"	V/A	Wilshire District Music Presents: Miracle Mile Volume One
2010	"Married Girl 3462"	Greenie	It's All Good
