= DJ Charlie Chase =

American DJ (born 1959)

- Born: Carlos Mendes; January 16, 1959 (age 67); Manhattan, New York, United States
- Genres: Hip-hop
- Occupation: DJ
- Years active: 1975–present

Carlos Mendes (born January 16, 1959), also known as DJ Charlie Chase, is a Puerto Rican DJ. He helped establish the Latino community as a contributing force in the Bronx's early hip-hop culture. DJ Charlie Chase is recognized for his contributions to the early development of hip-hop music and culture. Chase joined the hip-hop scene in 1975 as a founding member of The Cold Crush Brothers, along with DJ Tony Tone and members Grandmaster Caz, Jerry Dee Lewis, Almighty KG, and EZ A.D. In 1980, Chase and DJ Tony Tone were responsible for organizing the first MC convention in hip-hop history.

== Early life ==
Chase was born in Manhattan, New York, on January 16, 1959, to Puerto Rican–born parents. His family moved often and lived in different New York City neighborhoods, which were primarily Puerto Rican or Black. Chase began playing music as a bassist at the age of fourteen, performing a variety of musical styles. Chase produced his first album at the age of 16.

== Career ==
In the 1980s, Chase DJ'd for WBLS alongside Funkmaster Flex. Chase received criticism from some in the Hispanic community for playing hip-hop music because, at the time, it was regarded as a distinctly Black form of music. He merged hip-hop with salsa, among other genres. In the early 1980s, Chase was the DJ for the New York group The Cold Crush Brothers, the first hip-hop group to be signed by CBS Records. In 1981, Chase got his first movie role, playing himself in the film Wild Style, in which he had a small speaking part and performed with his group. Chase was inducted into the Technics DMC DJ Hall of Fame in 2003.

== Influence ==
Chase was among the few Hispanic artists in the early hip-hop scene. He has opened up about not feeling welcome in hip-hop: “[it's] a Black thing and something that’s from their roots…being Hispanic, you’re not accepted in rap.”

Chase was vocal about his ethnicity, despite some backlash. “That was my way of opening the doors for everybody else to do what they’re doing now,” he said, “and being that I was there at the very beginning, that was the way I had to do it. That was my contribution.”

When artists like The Mean Machine began to popularize Spanish-language hip-hop, Chase was wary that they were straying too far from hip-hop's roots. Eventually, he recognized their new contributions to the genre and put his support behind what he deemed “cool and new.”

Chase's work influenced many artists who came after him, such as underground acts like Mellow Man Ace and Latin Empire, as well as mainstream rappers like Fat Joe and Big Pun.

== See also ==
- Latin hip hop
