= Disco Dream =

"Disco Dream" was a single released in 1981 by early rap group The Mean Machine through Sugar Hill Records. It is the only single the group recorded on that label, released on a 12" 33 RPM vinyl single (Sugar Hill serial number SH-564, also inscribed "VID-212-A19"). The track is significant for being the first rap song recorded which contained both English and Spanish, sometimes referred to as Spanglish. The group recorded a single on the Honey Hush label in 1986.

== Track listing ==
- A1. Disco Dream (Vocal) (6:30)
- B2. Disco Dream (Instrumental) (6:30)

== Recording and credits ==
Recording was done at Sweet Mountain Studios in Englewood, New Jersey. The song was recorded to the tune of Grace Jones' song Pull Up to the Bumper with music provided by Sugar Hill's house band, including percussionist Ed "Duke Bootee" Fletcher and bassist Doug Wimbish. Doug mentioned in an interview that "I think Chris Lord-Alge was on the boards for that one" implying that Lord-Alge mixed the track. Engineering credits go to Steve Jerome. On the single, production credits go to "Sylvia, Inc. and Jigsaw Prod. Inc." The credits on the single include "S. Robinson, J. Chase, S. Santiago, D. Rivera Jr., J. McLean, J. Semprit". The first is producer/Sugar Hill founder Sylvia Robinson, the last four are members of the group, and J. Chase was probably a producer (the name is listed as a producer on several other Sugar Hill singles). A keyboardist is also obviously present on the track; while no credit is given to one. Cool Cliff was a child rapper, son of DJ Julio.

== Other releases ==
The song has appeared in edited form (running time 4:28) on several Sugar Hill Records compilations. Many lyrics have been removed from the song, "including one inviting all listeners, straight "or even gay," to party to their music."
