= Disco King Mario =

American rapper (1956–1994)

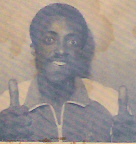
- Mario in 1981

Background information
- Born: July 1, 1956; North Carolina
- Origin: North Carolina, Bronx, New York
- Died: May 21, 1994 (aged 37) Saint Barnabas Hospital, Bronx, N.Y
- Genres: Hip hop
- Occupations: DJ, Promoter
- Years active: 1971-1994
- Label: Chuck Chuck City

Disco King Mario (July 1, 1956 – May 21, 1994) was a prominent Black American DJ and pioneer of hip-hop culture. He is known for being one of the founding fathers of hip-hop. His outdoor parties and park jams made him well known in and around the Bronxdale housing projects, and he was also a member of the Black Spades. Mario's family hailed from Edenton, North Carolina, the place of his birth.

== DJing & Career ==
Mario moved from Edenton North Carolina, and relocated to the Bronxdale Houses in the 1960's. In the early 1970's he began to DJ and organize outdoor block parties and park jams. He is noted as one of the first DJ's to start doing this in The Bronx and New York City. His events brought him recognition throughout New York City. In the early stages of hip-hop, the DJ's were the stars at events, with the rappers being secondary. Mario put on many early shows in the "Gleason Watson" playground, also known as "Rosedale park", in The Bronx. At this time Mario was a prominent member and leader in The Black Spades street gang, which granted additional security to his parties. His crew and event production company was known as "Chuck Chuck City" Mario's sound system evolved greatly over the years. Kool DJ Dee and Tyrone the Mixologist influenced and aided the upgrades to his sound system, which became known for its superior sound quality.

== Influence ==
Mario influenced some of the other DJs who were also throwing events around the time of DJ Kool Herc's 1973 indoor party, which is often hailed as the start of hip-hop. Afrika Bambaattaa started out as an assistant to Disco King Mario, and Mario loaned Bambaataa the technical equipment for many of his first DJ appearances. Mario's negotiating ability and clout also helped Bambaataa gain access to many venues and spread Bambaataa's name throughout the community. Mario's Black Spades provided security and made sure Kool Herc and Bambattaa were safe at many events. Bambaataa would eventual face Mario in his first DJ-Battle that took place in 1976 in the New York Junior High School 123 For a time, early emcee's Busy Bee Starki was under Mario's guidance and a part of his "Chuck Chuck City" fold. Busy Bee Starski referenced Mario on his 1988 track "Old School" from his album Running Thangs.

Mario never released any records or produced any notable original works of music. However some historians argue that his early role in the organic development of hip-hop is not sufficiently recognized.

== Memorials ==
In Rosedale Park, The Bronx, where Mario once played in the 1970s he was honored by many hip-hop icons like Grand Master Melle Mel, Kurtis Blow and many female pioneers like Lisa Lee and many others.

In 2023, Rosedale Avenue was officially co-named "Disco King Mario Way"
