= The Mean Machine (rap group) =

Puerto Rican rap group

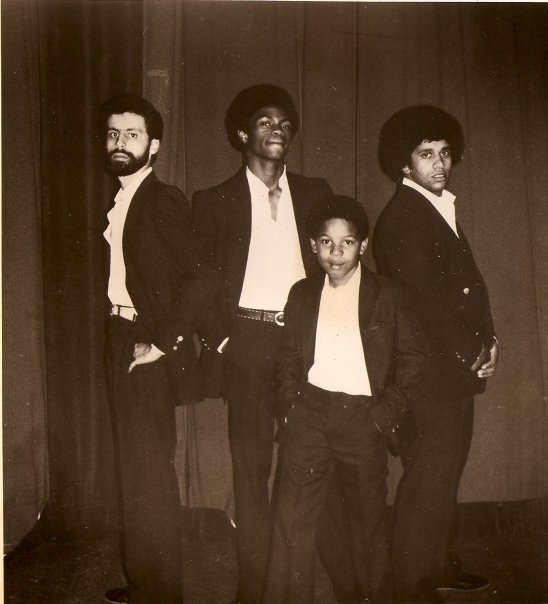
From Left to Right: Mr. Schick (Daniel Rivera Jr.), Jimmy Mac (James McLean), Cool Cliff (Clifford Santiago) and DJ Julio (Steven Santiago)

The Mean Machine was a rap group composed of Puerto Ricans who rapped in both English and Spanish. They are known for the single "Disco Dream", released as a 12" 33 RPM single in 1981 on the Sugar Hill Records label. In 1986, they recorded a single called "At The Party" on the Honey Hush label. The group is often cited as the first bilingual rap group, and is possibly the first ever Latin hip hop group.

== Members ==
- DJ Julio (Steven Santiago)
- Jimmy Mac (James McLean)
- Mr. Nice (Jose Semprit)
- Mr. Schick (Daniel Rivera Jr.)
- Butch Kid (Roman Barksdale Jr.)
- Cool Cliff (Clifford Santiago)
