= Prince Whipper Whip =

American rapper

James Austin Whipper II, better known by his stage name Prince Whipper Whip, is an American hip hop recording artist. He is of Puerto Rican descent and an original member of Grandwizard Theodore & the Fantastic Five.

Whipper Whip appears in the music video for Ice-T's 1988 hit "High Rollers" and has guest appearances on records by The Beatnuts, Brother Ali, De La Soul, DJ Z-Trip, "O.G. Funk" by Billy Bass Nelson & the Funkadelic, "Can I Get a Soul Clap" and "Wild Style" by Grandwizard Theodore & the Fantastic Five, "Sabrosisimo", "La Vida", "Tenemo Ritmo" and "Down by Law" by Kid Frost, "This is Hip Hop" and "Respect" by DJ Charlie Chase & Breaking Bread Records, "Tuff City" by Grandmaster Caz, and "Round by Round" by Grand Master Melle Mel & M C B.

== Personal life ==
He has four children: James Whipper III, Joshua Whipper, Sarah Whipper and Grace Whipper.
