= The Cold Crush Brothers =

American hip-hop group

Cold Crush Brothers
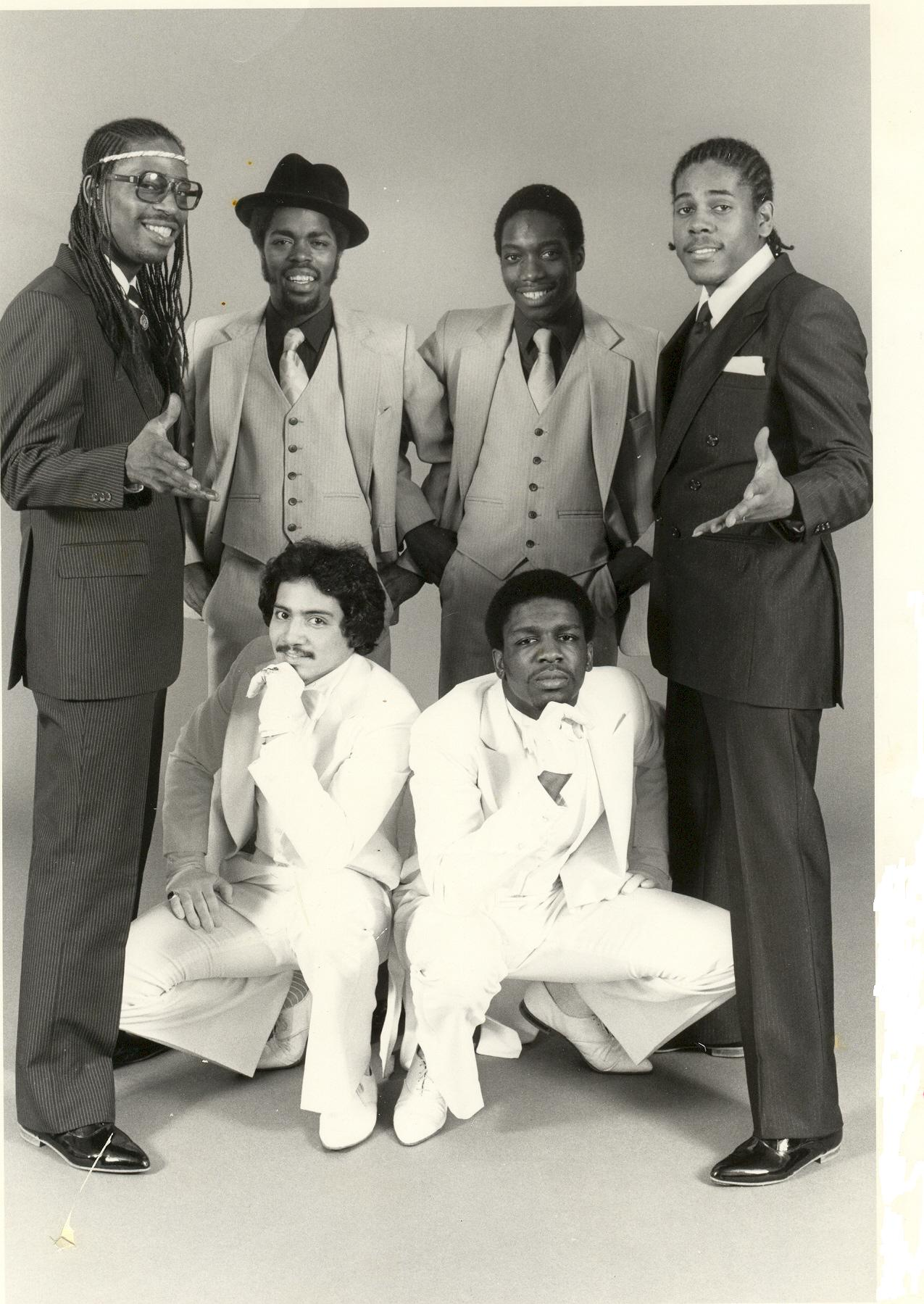

Background information
- Origin: The Bronx, New York, U.S.
- Genre: Hip-hop
- Years active: 1978–present
- Members: Almighty Kay Gee; DJ Tony Tone; Easy A.D. Grandmaster Caz; DJ Ultamate
- Past members: Dot-A-Rock; Money Ray; DJ OutLaw; Jerry Dee Lewis; Whipper Whip; Mr.Tee; DJ Charlie Chase

The Cold Crush Brothers are an American hip-hop group that was formed in the Bronx, New York City, in 1978, as part of the early hip-hop movement. They were widely recognized as pioneers of the genre's formative era.

== History ==
=== Formation and early years (1978–1981) ===
The Cold Crush Brothers were formed in 1978. The original line-up included DJ Tony Tone, Supreme Easy A.D., DJ Charlie Chase, Whipper Whip, Mr. Tee, and Dot-A-Rock. Eventually, Whipper Whip and Dot-A-Rock would leave the group and join DJ Grandwizard Theodore & the Fantastic Five. After the departure of Mr. Tee, Grandmaster Caz, Almighty Kay Gee, and J.D.L. were brought in to fill the vacancies. Money Ray would also join the group in the late 1980s.

The group became involved in one of hip-hop's most famous moments when Joey Robinson, son of Sugar Hill Records founder Sylvia Robinson, happened to hear Big Bank Hank, a part-time club bouncer and former manager of Grandmaster Caz, rapping to a Cold Crush Brothers tape while working at a pizzeria in New Jersey. Robinson informed Hank that he was forming a group called The Sugar Hill Gang and asked if he would like to join. Hank accepted, although he was not an MC. Grandmaster Caz's rhymes were used in a song by the Sugar Hill Gang called "Rapper's Delight". The song became a hit in 1979 and was the first hip-hop single to land on the Top 40 charts. Caz claimed his lyrics were stolen and never received any credit or compensation for the rhymes that he contributed.

Because of the attention, many groups battled the Cold Crush Brothers to gain street credibility and alleged hip-hop supremacy. Producers such as James Mudd and Sea Dog also sampled the songs. This led to a rivalry with The Fantastic Five, culminating in a lyrical battle between the groups on July 3, 1981. The grand prize was $1,000 cash. The Fantastic Romantic Five (as they later came to be known, due to popularity with female audiences) won the battle, but after recordings of their battle began to circulate, the Cold Crush Brothers rose in popularity.

=== Wild Style and early success (1982–1984) ===
The Cold Crush Brothers toured all five boroughs of New York City and Boston before commercially releasing records. The group also saw success in the sales of live performance recordings. They were featured in the 1982 movie Wild Style (by Charlie Ahearn), depicting hip-hop culture. In the movie, the Cold Crush Brothers appeared in several scenes, including a face-off against rival group, the Fantastic Five, on a basketball court.

== Commercial releases ==
The Cold Crush Brothers began to release records commercially in 1982. Their first single, "Weekend", was released in the fall of 1982. In 1983, the band toured in Europe and Japan. After this tour, the Cold Crush Brothers were able to gain a CBS record deal through the Tuff City label. They were the first rap crew to receive a CBS record deal. It was the first time in hip-hop history that an independent hip-hop record label and a major record company, such as CBS, worked together.

Their second single, "Punk Rock Rap," was released in the fall of 1983 on Epic Records, licensed by UK CBS Associated Records overseas and in the United States on Tuff City Records, and distributed by CBS Records. "Punk Rock Rap" was the first hip-hop recording to fuse hip-hop and rock. "Punk Rock Rap" was sampled by hip-hop artist Doug E. Fresh, namely the phrase, "Oh My God!" for his hip-hop single "The Show", released in 1985.

The Cold Crush Brothers' most successful single was "Fresh, Wild, Fly & Bold", released in 1984, which sold more than 16,000 units in its first week of release.

The Cold Crush Brothers were early members of the worldwide hip-hop organization called Ill Crew Universal.

== Legacy ==
Rapper Jay-Z's 2001 single "Izzo (H.O.V.A.)" uses the Cold Crush Brothers as his example of the music industry's exploitation of artists:

"Industry shady; it need to be taken over / Label owners hate me; I'm raisin' the status quo up / I'm overchargin' niggaz for what they did to the Cold Crush / Pay us like you owe us for all the years that you hoe'd us."

Money Ray died on October 3, 2002, from liver cancer at the age of 38 in the Bronx, New York.

In 2008, "At the Dixie" from Wild Style was ranked at number 77 on VH1's 100 Greatest Songs of Hip Hop.

DJ Tony Crush was inducted into the Smithsonian National Museum of African American History and Culture on its opening day, September 24, 2016.

Jerry Dee Lewis died on March 23, 2026, at the age of 65.
