= Joe Conzo Jr. =

American photographer

- Born: February 6, 1963 (age 63); Bronx, New York, U.S.
- Education: School of Visual Arts
- Known for: Photography
- Notable work: Born In The Bronx: A Visual Record of the Early Days of Hip Hop

Joe Conzo Jr. (born February 6, 1963) is an American photographer, author, and retired paramedic renowned for his pivotal role in documenting the early days of hip-hop culture in New York City. Dubbed "the man who took hip-hop's baby pictures" by The New York Times, Conzo's work offers an intimate glimpse into the burgeoning hip-hop scene of the late 1970s and early 1980s.

== Early life and education ==
Joe Conzo Jr. grew up in the St. Mary's Projects on 149th Street in the Mott Haven area of the Bronx, New York. His entire family, starting with his grandmother, stayed in the Mott Haven area and all attended P.S. 25. Conzo comes from a family deeply involved in activism and music. His grandmother, Dr. Evelina López Antonetty, was a prominent community activist known as the "Hell Lady of the Bronx" for her relentless advocacy for the educational rights of minorities and immigrant communities. She was involved with the pro-independence movement and political prisoners, and started the United Bronx Parents organization in the 1950s. Conzo witnessed his grandmother's activism, participating in demonstrations and takeovers of institutions like Lincoln Hospital, schools, and Hostos Community College. He also documented protests his grandmother spearheaded, such as those against the 1981 movie Fort Apache, the Bronx.

His father, Joe Conzo Sr., was a manager, assistant, and publicist for orchestra leader Tito Puente for many years, and is considered a foremost historian of Afro Latin music. Joe Conzo Jr. grew up around Latin musicians like Machito, Charlie Palmieri, Johnny Pacheco, and Ray Barretto.

Conzo's passion for photography began as a young boy. His stepfather, Michael Kane, an amateur photographer, introduced him to photography. His two great aunts, Elba and Lillian, who loved taking family photos, also inspired him. He attended the Agnes Russell School on the campus of Columbia University, where he started developing his skills at the age of nine. He started taking pictures as an extracurricular activity in middle school at Clark 149. His mother even converted one of their bathrooms into a darkroom for him. He then attended South Bronx High School where he dove further into photography. He continued his formal artistic education at the School of Visual Arts (NYC).

== Career ==
=== Early Photography ===
Conzo's early photos included famous musicians like Tito Puente, Celia Cruz, and his father's friends. Some of his photographs of Tito Puente occasionally appeared as album covers. His first published photograph was of Paul Newman in the New York Post. Conzo used his camera as a way to communicate and move between different social cliques in the South Bronx. He was known as "Joey Snapz" or "Joey Kane."

=== Documenting Hip-Hop ===
While attending South Bronx High School, Conzo became friends with Adriane Harris (AD) and Tony Tone, who were forming the group the Cold Crush Brothers. He was invited to photograph them and eventually became their personal photographer, following them to performances throughout New York City. Through his involvement with Cold Crush, he met and documented other influential young rappers and groups such as Afrika Bambaataa, the Treacherous Three, Grandmaster Flash and the Furious Five, The Fearless Four, and The Fantastic Five. He photographed performances in legendary early hip-hop venues like the T-Connection, Disco Fever, Harlem World, the Ecstasy Garage, and the Hoe Avenue Boy's Club. His photographs, collected in the book Born in the Bronx, offer intimate glimpses into early hip-hop, capturing it as a "modest, homespun phenomenon". He often shot inches away from the action, capturing raw, unposed moments. Conzo states that "Our story has to be told by ourselves. We have to control the narrative," which is how he approaches photography.

=== Substance Abuse and Recovery ===
During his high school years, Conzo became involved with drugs, and his addiction intensified after his grandmother's death in 1984. He sold all his photography equipment for drug money. Fortunately, his mother, Lorraine Montenegro, saved all his negatives and prints. After being arrested for shoplifting in 1991, he was ordered into treatment, where he overcame his substance-use disorder. He also had a stint in the Army during this period.

=== Emergency Medical Technician (EMT) and Fire Department ===
After getting clean, Conzo trained as an Emergency Medical Technician (EMT) and began working for the New York City Fire Department (FDNY). He worked on an ambulance in the same neighborhood where he grew up. He was among the first responders at the World Trade Center on September 11, 2001, arriving just after the second plane hit, and had to dig his way out of the rubble. His near-death experience strengthened his resolve to maintain control of his life. Conzo, like many first responders, was diagnosed years later with 9/11-related cancer (liver and pancreatic cancer), which is now in remission. He advocated for fair compensation for emergency workers who were killed or injured on 9/11, contributing to the establishment of the 9/11 Victims' Compensation Fund. After over a decade as a medic, he served as a union leader for the FDNY for eight years, rising to the position of vice president. He retired from the FDNY in 2018.

=== Return to Photography and Legacy ===
Buoyed by the rediscovery of his hip-hop work in the mid-2000s, Conzo resumed his photography career. In 2005, The New York Times reporter David González heralded him as "The Man Who Took Hip-Hop's Baby Pictures". Around two years prior, a friend from the Cold Crush Brothers introduced him to Johan Kugelberg, a European collector, which led to a London exhibit of his photos.

Conzo collaborated with American photographer and videographer Henry Chalfant for the documentary "From Mambo to Hip Hop: A South Bronx Tale" (2006), which featured some of Conzo's Cold Crush Brothers images.

In 2007, Conzo and Johan Kugelberg published the seminal book "Born In The Bronx: A Visual Record of the Early Days of Hip Hop". This book has received worldwide acclaim and has been translated into German.

The Cornell Hip Hop Collection, established in 2007, is the permanent home of Joe Conzo Jr.'s archive, containing over 10,000 of his negatives and prints. The digitization of over 10,000 film images taken by him has begun, with more than 6,000 images freely available online. Conzo and Kugelberg are considered key figures in the expansion of the Cornell Hip Hop Collection.

Conzo's photographs have appeared in various publications, including The New York Times, Vibe, The Source, Hip-Hop Connection, Urban Hitz, Esquire, and Wax Poetics. He continues to photograph hip-hop and other music performers today. He also lectures, meets with young people, exhibits his work internationally, and attends global events.

== Personal life ==
Joe Conzo Jr. is a father and husband. His mother, Lorraine Montenegro, played a crucial role in preserving his early photographic work by saving his negatives during his battle with substance abuse. His sister, Stacy Connolly, recalls him always having the Cold Crush Brothers at their house, with Joey having his camera at all times.

Conzo has openly discussed his past struggles with drug addiction, which led him to sell his camera equipment. He entered recovery after an arrest in 1991. He also faced a serious health battle with liver and pancreatic cancer after his retirement in 2018, which he has since overcome and is in remission.

In recent years, Conzo has channeled his grandmother's spirit of activism by organizing tenants in the Bronx who faced eviction notices after a private-equity company acquired their buildings, successfully leading to their landlord backing down. He expresses a deep love for the Bronx, instilled by his grandmother and mother, emphasizing the importance of preserving their heritage and helping others.

== Publications ==
- Conzo, Joe Jr. and Kugelberg, Johan. Born In The Bronx: A Visual Record of the Early Days of Hip Hop (2007, 2021).

== Honors and awards ==
- 2006 ALMA Award, Best Television Documentary: For his collaboration on "From Mambo to Hip Hop: A South Bronx Tale".
- Bronx Walk of Fame: Inducted in May 2021.
- Founding Member: The Hip Hop Museum.
