= Sotomayor Houses =

Public housing development in the Bronx, New York

- NYCHA property
- Location within New York City
- Coordinates: 40.8264°N 73.8672°W
- Country: United States
- State: New York
- City: New York City
- Borough: Bronx
- ZIP codes: 10472
- Area codes: 718, 347, 929, and 917

The Justice Sonia Sotomayor Houses and Community Center is a housing project in Soundview, The Bronx, New York City. Formerly known as the Bronxdale Houses, the project was renamed in honor of Supreme Court Justice Sonia Sotomayor, who had spent part of her childhood in the development, in June 2010. The complex opened in January 1955. The 28-building complex contains nearly 1,500 apartments. It was designed by architects Leon and Lionel Levy. The 30.77-acre development is bordered by Bruckner Boulevard and Watson, Soundview and Leland Avenues. The former Bronxdale Houses also played a role in the early development of hip hop, particularly through resident Disco King Mario.

== History ==
The New York City Housing Authority developed the Bronxdale Houses on previously vacant land as a federally funded public housing project. In December 1951, NYCHA awarded a $7.587 million construction contract for the development. Designed by architects Leon and Lionel Levy, with landscaping by Clara Coffey and W. S. Cooper, the development was completed on January 31, 1955. Early residents were predominantly working-class families, including many World War II veterans.

By the 1960s, Bronxdale Houses had a racially and ethnically diverse population; New York City Housing Authority records from the period indicated that about half of the development's residents were white, approximately 30 percent were Black and 20 percent were Puerto Rican. Residents who grew up there during the period recalled the development as well maintained and relatively safe, although its population changed as many white families left South Bronx public housing during the early 1960s. The Black Spades originated at Bronxdale Houses in 1968, when a group of local teenagers organized in and around the development before expanding into one of the Bronx's largest street organizations during the early 1970s.

Entering the early 1970s, Bronxdale Houses was experiencing significant crime and security problems; a preliminary victimization survey found that the development's overall crime rate was much higher than the New York City average. In 1972, NYCHA invited architect Oscar Newman to redesign the grounds of Bronxdale Houses using principles from his theory of defensible space, which sought to improve security by modifying the physical environment to encourage surveillance and a greater sense of territorial responsibility among residents. The development subsequently became the site of an experimental electronic-surveillance program in which closed-circuit television cameras were installed in the lobbies and elevators of three buildings. Images from the cameras were transmitted on a split screen to a channel on residents' television sets, allowing tenants to monitor common areas and report suspicious activity to Housing Authority police. The broader security plan also proposed surveillance of exterior grounds, intercom systems and other modifications intended to increase resident oversight of public spaces. A 1978 evaluation of the program found that the surveillance system did not reduce crime or residents' fear of crime and reported that the equipment was frequently subjected to vandalism.

Bronxdale Houses also became an important site in the developing Bronx hip-hop scene during the early 1970s. Resident Disco King Mario held some of hip-hop's early neighborhood jams with his Chuck Chuck City crew. Mario and Afrika Bambaataa were members of the Black Spades, and Mario provided equipment for some of Bambaataa's early DJ performances.

On May 20, 2010, the NYCHA Board approved the renaming of the Bronxdale Houses and its community center in honor of Sonia Sotomayor, who lived in the development from 1957 to 1969 and became the first Hispanic justice of the Supreme Court of the United States in 2009. The name change followed a petition organized by residents, housing advocates and Bronx elected officials. A formal renaming ceremony was held on June 4, 2010, when the development became the Justice Sonia Sotomayor Houses and Community Center. It was the first NYCHA development to be named for a living former resident.

== Notable people ==
- Andre Harrell (1960-2020), rapper and music executive
- Sonia Sotomayor (born 1954), Supreme Court Justice.
- Disco King Mario (1956-1994), DJ and hip-hop pioneer
- Bruse Wane, rapper and music executive
- Mitch "Blood" Green (born 1957), four time New York Golden Gloves champion and former heavyweight boxer
- Drag-On (born 1980), rapper and member of Ruff Ryders
- Aaron "Superman" Davis (born 1967), former professional boxer and WBA welterweight champion
- Treston Irby (born 1973), member of R&B group Hi-Five.

== See also ==
- New York City Housing Authority
- List of New York City Housing Authority properties
