= Michael Ford (architect) =

American architect

- Born: Detroit, Michigan, U.S.
- Education: University of Detroit Mercy (MArch)
- Occupation: Architect

Michael Ford, known as the "Hip-Hop Architect", is an architect, designer, educator, and keynote speaker whose years of research, publications and lectures seek to fuse his two passions, hip-hop culture and architecture. In hip-hop architecture, Ford provides an alternative to the western canon in architecture and urban theory. This model is not only celebrates diversity, but it is also appealing to young people of color, encouraging them to join the profession and think critically about the built environment they live in. Ford is a professor in the architecture program at Madison College and founder of BrandNu Design.

Ford was born and raised in Detroit, Michigan.

== Education ==
Ford received his Masters of Architecture degree from the University of Detroit Mercy, where he wrote his graduate thesis, "Hip Hop Inspired Architecture and Design."

== Career ==
According to Ford, the built environment has a profound impact on the live.s of its inhabitants, but these effects are disproportionately detrimental for people of color. Through music, hip-hop specifically, communities of color excluded from the architectural discourse have been able to participate in the dialogue and voice critique. In response to these observations, Ford co-founded the Urban Arts Collective where he designed and launched the Hip-Hop Architecture Camp, a free summer intensive geared toward children and aimed at both diversifying the architectural curriculum and increasing diversity in the field. The camp guides participants through explorations of rap and hip-hop lyrics dealing with the built environment, using the shared passion to learn about design and the intersection of architecture and music. Ford is also the architect behind the design of the Bronx Hip Hop Museum, opened in 2018. In the design process of the museum, Ford used what he calls design cyphers, a format inspired by hip-hop's rap battles and dance battles which create a space for co-creation and creative collaboration. Ford used these circles to help facilitate collaboration between hip-hop artists, architecture students, and design professionals and launch the design of the project from the bottom up.

Ford's Hip Hop Architecture research has been published in a variety of places including, Oprah Winfrey Network, Rolling Stone Magazine, Fast Company Design, Blavity, The Fader, CityLab, Vibe Magazine, and NBC’s The TODAY Show.

Among his notable lectures, Ford was a 2017 keynote speaker at the AIA Conference on Architecture and has a TEDx titled “Hip Hop Architecture as Modernism's Post Occupancy Evaluation.”

== Awards and honors ==
- Spirit of Detroit Award, Detroit City Council November 20, 2019

== Keynotes and lectures ==
- Keynote Speaker, Verdical Group's annual Net Zero Conference; October 2025
- Speaker, Hospitality Design Next Gen Forum; October 19, 2021
- Podcast, Architect Magazine; Episode 55: Michael Ford on the Intersection of Hip Hop, Activism, and Architecture; June 30, 2020
- Speaker, Designing a Just City - Hip Hop Architecture, a Keynote Conversation; SxSWECO; 2016
- Speaker, AIA Conference on Architecture - Anticipate Change: What's Next for Architecture; Keynote Panel; Saturday, April 29, 2017
