= Grandmaster Caz =

American rapper (born 1960)

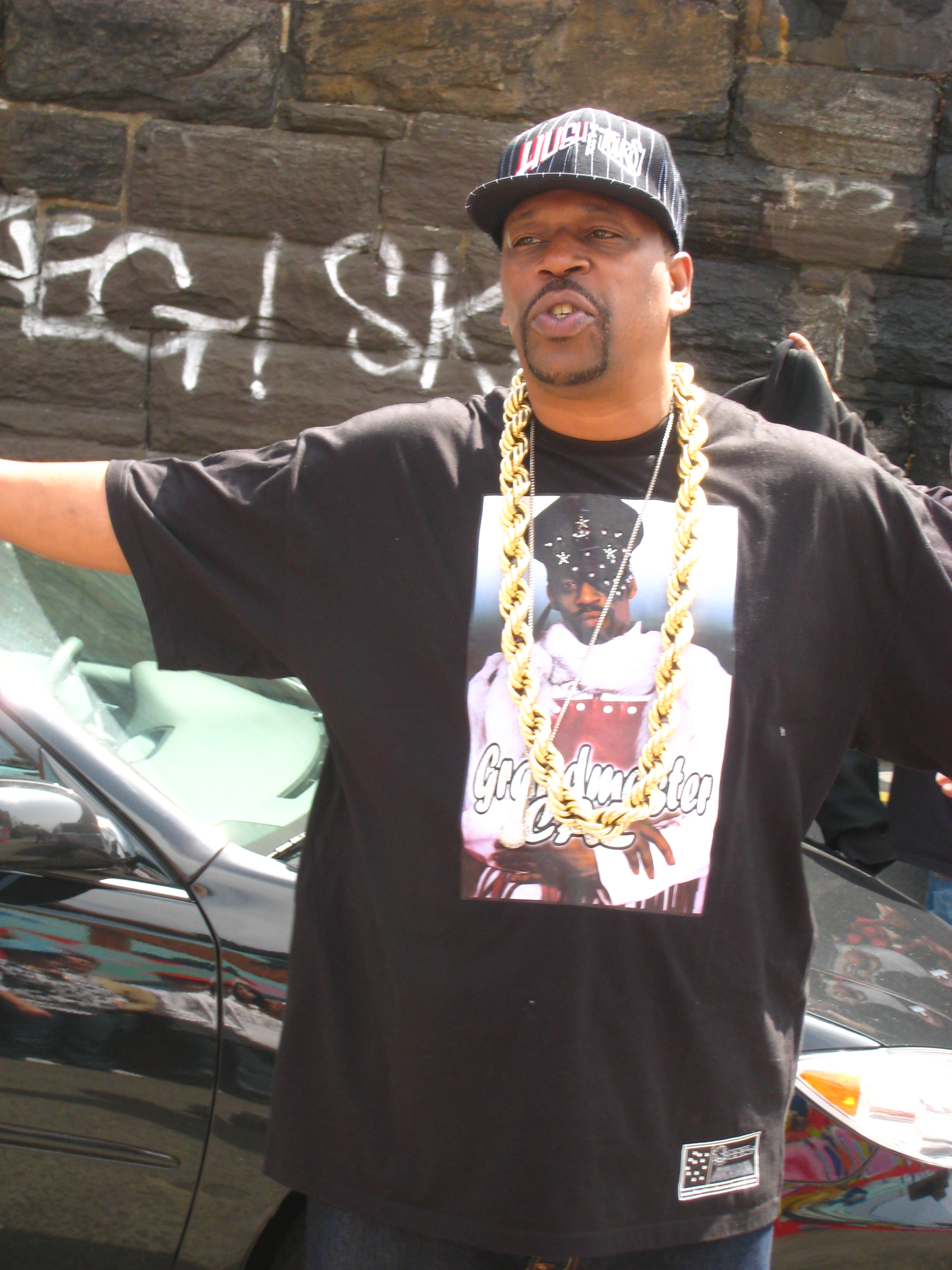
- Grandmaster Caz in 2007

Background information
- Also known as: Casanova Fly
- Born: Curtis Brown; April 18, 1960 (age 66); The Bronx, New York City, U.S.
- Genre: Hip-hop
- Occupations: Rapper; DJ; songwriter; MC; author; Host actor; CEO & President of GMC Entertainment Inc.
- Instruments: Turntables; vocals
- Years active: 1978–present
- Labels: Tuff City; Ol' Skool Flava; Jazz Child; Chrysalis; Toshiba-EMI; Beyongolia; 360°
- Website: www.coldcrushbrothers.com

Curtis Brown (born April 18, 1960), better known by the stage names Grandmaster Caz and Casanova Fly, is an American rapper, songwriter, and DJ. He was a member of the hip-hop group The Cold Crush Brothers from 1979 to the mid-1980s. He is best known as the (uncredited) main writer of Big Bank Hank's raps on the seminal 1979 hip-hop single by The Sugarhill Gang, "Rapper's Delight".

He worked with Debra Harris as a celebrity tour guide for Hush Hip Hop Tours, a hip-hop cultural sightseeing tour company in New York City, and is a board member of The Kennedy Center's Hip-Hop Council, Hip-Hop Ambassador and board member for Windows of HipHop and CEO of GMC Entertainment Inc.

== Musical career ==
Caz lived 2 blocks away from DJ Kool Herc. Caz as a 13 year old boy first encountered rap in 1973 at a Kool Herc block party. Shortly after, he teamed with DJ Disco Wiz under the name Casanova Fly to form one of the first DJ crews, Mighty Force. Caz was also the first rapper to perform both DJ (record) and MC (vocal) duties.

In the late 1970s, he joined The Cold Crush Brothers. Caz admits that he himself stole new equipment during the New York City blackout of 1977.

In 2015, Caz was featured on the single "Downtown" by Macklemore & Ryan Lewis.

=== Sugarhill Gang controversy ===
Grandmaster Caz is generally acknowledged to have been the main writer of the lyrics of Big Bank Hank (real name Henry Lee Jackson) on the 1979 The Sugarhill Gang single "Rapper's Delight", which sold around 5 million copies and introduced hip-hop to the mainstream. Jackson had been Grandmaster Caz's manager, and was working at a pizza parlor when music executive Sylvia Robinson overheard him rapping Grandmaster Caz's lyrics, and asked him to be part of the group she was forming, The Sugarhill Gang. Jackson who had never rapped before had Caz's lyric notebook which he lifted directly from for the song. This is most evident in his opening verse, when, instead of introducing himself as Big Bank Hank, he raps, "Check it out, I'm the C-A-S-A-, N-O-V-A, and the rest is F-L-Y". (Casanova Fly is Grandmaster Caz's alternate moniker.) Big Bank Hank's verse in the song about seducing Lois Lane away from Superman was also lifted from Caz's notebook.

In 2000, Caz released the song "MC Delight", a parody of "Rapper's Delight" which told his side of the story. In the song, Caz states about giving away his lyrics, "I gave it to him thinking/ Check books, credit cards, more money/ Than a sucker could ever spend/ But he never gave a nigga a god damn dime/ And was supposed to be my friend".

== Other work ==
He currently hosts Hush Hip Hop Tours, the official sightseeing tour of Harlem and The Bronx.

Caz was a prominent feature in Ice-T's 2012 documentary "Something from Nothing: The Art of Rap".

Caz was interviewed for the 2004 documentary Just to Get a Rep.

In 2008, he was one of the participants at the Cornell University Library conference on Hip Hop.

In November 2021, Grandmaster Caz and female MC Sha-Rock started co-hosting the show That's The Joint on the SiriusXM channel Rock The Bells Radio, run by LL Cool J. The show runs Monday through Friday, 10 AM to 1 PM.

At present Grandmaster Caz is working with and for A&E, MTV, Paramount, De La Calle, and the History Channel.

== Awards and honors ==
In 1998, Caz was listed #11 out of Blaze Magazine's Top 50 MCs of all Time. He was also inducted into the Technics DJ Hall of Fame in 1999.

In June 2008, Grandmaster Caz was inducted into the Bronx Walk of Fame. A street plaque bearing his name is now on permanent display on the Grand Concourse, the most famous thoroughfare in the Bronx.

On April 18, 2022, Grandmaster Caz's birthday, newly-appointed Bronx Borough President Vanessa Gibson proclaimed April 18 "Grandmaster Caz Day".

== Legacy ==
Artists who cite Grandmaster Caz as an influence include Will Smith, Rakim, Big Daddy Kane and Jay-Z.

Grandmaster Caz was portrayed by Jaleel White in the Drunk History episode "American Music".

In episode 3 of part 2 of The Get Down, while listening to "Rapper's Delight" on the radio, The Get Down Brothers' member, Boo, tells his date that Grandmaster Caz is the real writer of the line and says that Caz is the "nicest MC around".

== Discography ==
=== Albums ===
- The Grandest Of Them All (LP) Tuff City 1992
- You Need Stitches: The Tuff City Sessions 1982–1988 (LP) Ol' Skool Flava 2004
- Rare & Unreleased Old School Hip Hop '86–'87 (LP) Ol' Skool Flava 2006
- Mid Life Crisis (CD, Album) Jazz Child Records 2008

=== Singles & EPs ===
- Grandmaster Caz & Chris Stein – Wild Style Theme Rap 1 Chrysalis 1983
- Grand Master Caz & Chris Stein – Wild Style Theme Rap No.1 (12", Promo) Toshiba EMI Ltd 1983
- Yvette / Mister Bill (12") Tuff City 1985
- Count Basey (12") Tuff City 1986
- Get Down Grandmaster / I'm Caz (12") Tuff City 1987
- You Need Stitches (12") Tuff City 1989
- Star Search (12") Tuff City 1992
- Grandmaster Caz with Whipper Whip* – To All The Party People (12") Tuff City 1994
- 45 King Old School Remixes Vol. 4 (12", EP) Ol' Skool Flava 1996
- Grandmaster Caz & Chris Stein – Wild Style Theme Rap 1 / Wild Style Subway Rap Beyongolia 1998
- DJ Parker Lee Presents: Grandmaster Caz (12") Jazz Child Records 1999
- MC Delight (Casanova's Revenge) (12") Jazz Child Records 2000
- Grandmaster Caz & DJ Signify – Untitled (7") Grandgood Records 2003
- Grandmaster Caz & DJ Haitian Star – Move The Crowd / Scene Of The Rhyme (12", Ltd) 360° Records (2) 2005
- Capitol 1212 and Grandmaster Caz – Encore, Sure you Want More 12" Kool Kat records 2008

=== Compilations ===
- Wild Style Original Soundtrack 1982
- Crotona Park Jams (CD, Comp, Mixed) (Grandmaster Caz Self-released) 2008
- RareHipHop.com & Grandmaster Caz – Underground Heat Vol 1
