= Grandwizard Theodore & the Fantastic Five =

American hip hop group

- Origin: Bronx, New York, U.S.
- Genres: Old school hip-hop
- Years active: 1979–1994
- Members: Grandwizard Theodore; Waterbed Kev; Master Rob; Prince Whipper Whip; Ruby Dee; Dot-A-Rock.

Grandwizard Theodore & the Fantastic Five (also known as the Fantastic Freaks or simply Fantastic Five) was an old school hip hop group, best known for their 12" single, "Can I Get A Soul Clap" (1980) The group also appeared in the film Wild Style (1982) and recorded a song in 1994 with the Cold Crush Brothers and Terminator X which appeared on Terminator X's album, Super Bad. In 1998, they released Harlem World 1981, a recording of an MC battle between the Fantastic Five and Cold Crush Brothers, which had taken place in 1981.
