= Black Spades =

New York street gang

Black Spades/ Black Lotus
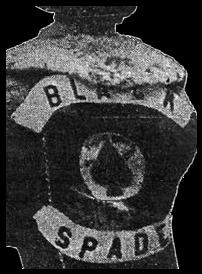
- Black Spades cut (vest)
- Founded: 1968; 58 years ago Bronx, NY
- Years active: 1968-Present
- Territory: Soundview, Bronx, New York, Boston, Maryland
- Membership: approx. 250
- Activities: extortion, street-level drug dealing

The Black Spades is a predominantly African-American street gang. The organization was formed in the Bronxdale houses projects in New York City during the late 1960s and gained popularity in the 1970s.

By the late 1980s, the gang began to spread from the Bronx to Manhattan, Queens, Brooklyn, and Staten Island in New York City, as well as New Rochelle in the state of New York, along with other locales in Massachusetts and Connecticut. During this period Latino and white members were more common.

In 2019, the Black Spades have made a comeback, with more members joining. They are now TBS New Direction, a community service group championing anti-violence initiatives and providing food distribution for the food insecure.

== History ==
The gang originated in 1968 in the Bronxdale Houses in the Soundview section of the Bronx. Although rumor says they were originally named the Savage Seven, the name from the start was the Black Spades. Hip Hop pioneer and then Bronxdale Houses resident Disco King Mario was a leader and original member of the Black Spades. He was also a prominent DJ, and is considered one of Hip Hop's founding fathers.

The Black Spades officially formed in Junior High School 123 on Morrison Ave in Soundview. Originally a teenage street organization, The Spades followed the teachings of The Five-Percent Nation, Malcolm X, the Nation of Islam, and were influenced by the Black Panthers and the Weather Underground Organization. Under the leadership of the original president David Brockington, who was a member of the Nation of Islam, the Spades organized to fight against the racism and bigotry in the Soundview, Clason Point, Parkchester, Castle Hill, and Throgs Neck neighborhoods of the Bronx. The 1st division Black Spades policed and protected Bronxdale Houses from the rise in crime, drug dealers, and heroin addicts who began to take over the community.

The gang quickly spread to nearby housing projects in the Soundview area (Monroe Houses, Soundview Houses, Bronx River Houses) and throughout the Bronx, starting a subculture inviting music into the lives of gang members. The Black Spades were also participants in the Hoe Avenue peace meeting. The Black Spades also included a women's division that started in Clason Point housing and Junior High School I.S. 131.

By the early 1970s, the Black Spades had increased in numbers, and members began to lose focus of their original purpose. The Black Spades and younger members (Young Spades/Baby Spades) became violent, and other divisions were unrestrained. David Brockington didn't like the direction that they were headed, so he stepped down as 1st division president. Afterwards, Monk became the new supreme president of the Black Spades, which became a full-fledged street gang.

Afrika Bambaataa was first a member in the Young Spade 1st division 1st chapter, then later joined the Bronx River Houses Black Spades 10th Division, before becoming a famous hip hop DJ. He went on to form the Universal Zulu Nation on November 12, 1977; with several members following him.

DJ Kool Herc, an early hip hop music pioneer, credits gangs including the Black Spades with getting the hip hop scene started:

It started coming together as far as the gangs terrorizing a lot of known discotheques back in the days. I had respect from some of the gang members because they used to go to school with me. There were the Savage Skulls, Glory Stompers, Blue Diamonds, Black Cats and Black Spades.

The organization had a strong following through the late 1990s. Around this time many young members of the organization transitioned their membership to the Bloods street gang of NYC.

In early 2022, a resurgence of Black Spades members has risen in the River Park Towers housing complex of the West Bronx. This latest incarnation of The Black Spades is a neighborhood self policing unit that has plans to participate in homeless food drives, after-school programs at CIS 229, and other positive neighborhood development.

== See also ==
- 80 Blocks From Tiffany's
- Universal Zulu Nation
