= Grand Wizzard Theodore =

Pioneering hip hop DJ

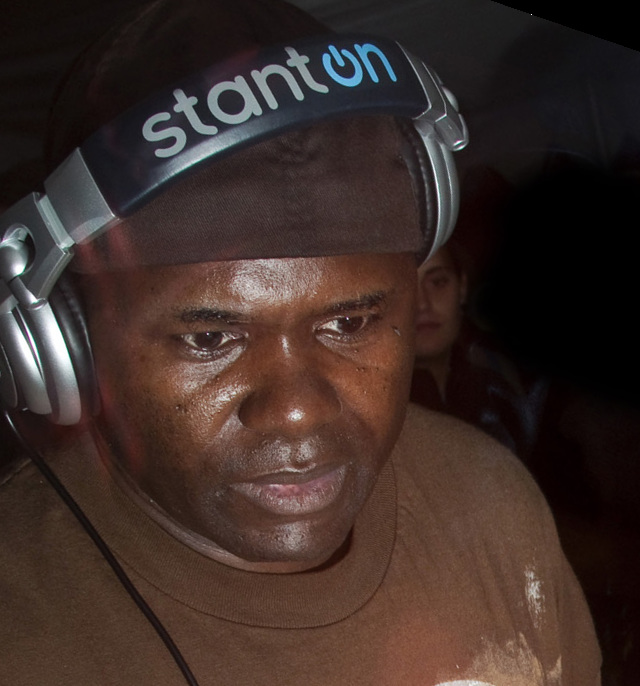
- Grand Wizzard Theodore at BelTek festival 2009

Background information
- Born: Theodore Livingston; March 5, 1963 (age 63); The Bronx, New York, U.S.
- Genre: Hip hop
- Occupations: Musician; DJ
- Years active: 1977–present

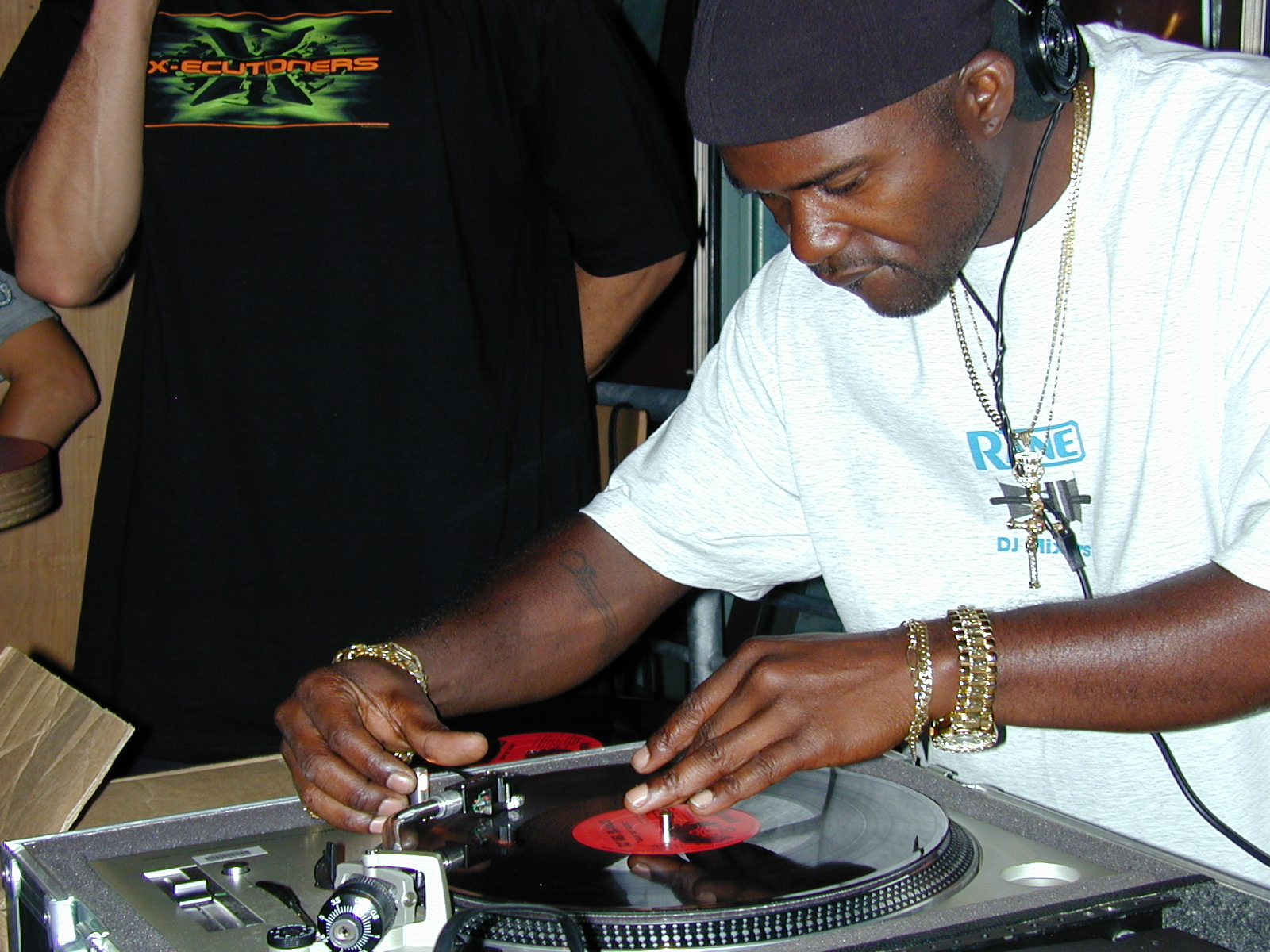
Theodore doing his famous "needle drop" at the Experience Music Project in Seattle 2002

Theodore Livingston (born March 5, 1963), better known as Grand Wizzard Theodore, is an American musician and DJ. He is widely credited as the inventor of the scratching technique. In addition to scratching, he gained credibility for his mastery of needle drops and other techniques which he invented or perfected.

== Early life ==
Born in the Bronx, New York, Theodore's brother, Mean Gene, was his mentor, who began teaching him the technique of DJing at an early age.

In 1975, Theodore was playing records in his bedroom with the volume all the way up. Furious with the noise, his mother entered the room and told Theodore to lower the volume, or she would turn off the music. According to Theodore, while his mother was standing in the doorway scolding him, he was still holding the record down with his hand, "rubbing the record back and forth", causing a scratching sound. After his mother left, Theodore realized he liked the sound, and thought it would be a good idea to incorporate it into his DJing. After practicing for a while, he threw a party where he introduced the technique known as scratching.

A dramatization of Theodore's invention of the record scratch was featured on Comedy Central's television show Drunk History, narrated by Questlove.

== Career ==
In the early 1980s, Theodore was a part of the group Grandwizard Theodore & the Fantastic Five. They released "Can I Get a Soul Clap" in 1982. He was also featured in the 1983 film Wild Style, as well as contributing to the film's soundtrack. He explains the origin of the scratch in the documentary, Scratch.

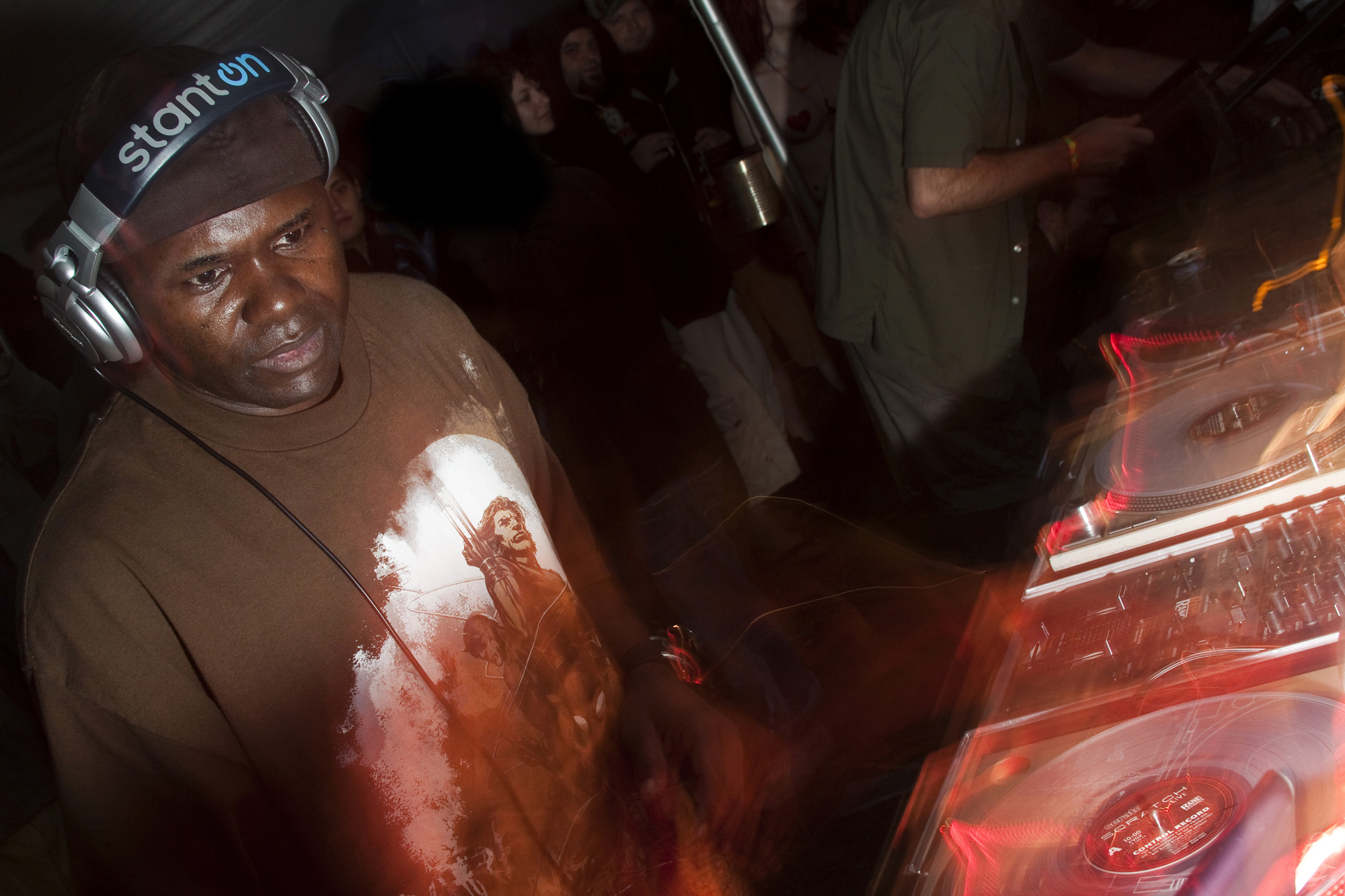
GrandWizzard Theodore at BelTek Festival in Belmont, Maine, 2009

== Legacy ==
Theodore's phrase "Say turn it up" from his track "Fantastic Freaks at the Dixie" was sampled by hip hop and rap acts such as Public Enemy (on the track "Bring the Noise"), Bomb the Bass (on the track "Megablast"), and many others.
